= Grateful Dead discography =

- The Steal Your Face image is one of the Grateful Dead's official logos.
- Studio albums: 13
- Live albums: 9
- Compilation albums: 15
- Singles: 27
- Video albums: 10
- Box sets: 29
- Retrospective live albums: 74
- Dick's Picks: 36
- Digital download series: 19
- Road Trips: 17
- Dave's Picks: 61

The discography of the rock band the Grateful Dead includes more than 200 albums, the majority of them recorded live in concert. The band has also released more than two dozen singles and a number of videos.

The Grateful Dead formed in the San Francisco Bay Area in 1965 amid the counterculture of the 1960s. They had many musical influences, and their music evolved to a great degree over time. They made extensive use of improvisation, and are considered one of the originators of jam band music. The founding members were Jerry Garcia on guitar and vocals, Bob Weir on guitar and vocals, Phil Lesh on bass and vocals, Bill Kreutzmann on drums, and Ron "Pigpen" McKernan on organ, harmonica, percussion, and vocals. Pigpen died in 1973, but the other four remained with the band for its entire 30-year history. Second drummer Mickey Hart was also in the band for most of that time. Others who were band members at different times were keyboardists Tom Constanten, Keith Godchaux, Brent Mydland, Vince Welnick, and Bruce Hornsby, and vocalist Donna Jean Godchaux.

While they were together, from 1965 to 1995, the Grateful Dead released thirteen studio albums and nine contemporary live albums. The nine live albums were recently recorded and mostly contained previously unreleased original material. They filled the role of traditional studio albums, and were an integral part of the contemporaneous evolution of the band. (The Dead's second album, Anthem of the Sun, was an experimental amalgam of studio and live material.)

In 1991, the band started releasing retrospective live albums, a practice that has continued to the present time. There are several series of these albums. The "traditional" live releases were created by remixing multitrack recordings of concerts. A second series of live albums, from 1993 to 2005, was Dick's Picks, concert recordings selected for their musical excellence but made using stereo recordings that did not allow the different musical parts to be remixed. Another series of albums was released in 2005 and 2006 in the form of digital downloads. This was followed by a series from 2007 to 2011 called Road Trips, and then, starting in 2012, by Dave's Picks.

The Grateful Dead's video albums include some albums that were released as both audio CDs and concert DVDs, either separately or together, and some that were released only on video, as well as two theatrical films. The band has also released several compilation albums and box sets.

== Studio and contemporary live albums ==
Unconventionally, the Grateful Dead made the release of live albums a common occurrence throughout their career. Because many were recently recorded and included previously unreleased original material, they often filled the role of traditional studio albums. An integral part of the contemporaneous evolution of the band, such live albums are included in this section.

Year	Title	Album details	Peak chart positions						Certifications
Year	Title	Album details	US	AUS	CAN	GER	NOR	UK	Certifications
1967	The Grateful Dead	Released: March 17, 1967; Label: Warner Bros.; Format: LP	73	—	—	—	—	—	
1968	Anthem of the Sun	Released: July 18, 1968; Label: Warner Bros.; Format: LP	87	—	—	—	—	—	
1969	Aoxomoxoa	Released: June 20, 1969; Label: Warner Bros.; Format: LP	73	—	—	—	—	—	US: Gold
1969	Live/Dead	Released: November 10, 1969; Label: Warner Bros.; Format: LP	64	—	66	—	—	—	US: Gold
1970	Workingman's Dead	Released: June 14, 1970; Label: Warner Bros.; Format: LP	27	—	17	66	—	69	US: Platinum
1970	American Beauty	Released: November 1, 1970; Label: Warner Bros.; Format: LP	30	34	43	100	—	27	US: 2× Platinum; UK: Gold
1971	Grateful Dead (also known as Skull and Roses)	Released: October 24, 1971; Label: Warner Bros.; Format: LP	25	—	28	—	—	—	US: Gold
1972	Europe '72	Released: November 5, 1972; Label: Warner Bros.; Format: LP	24	—	22	—	—	—	US: 2× Platinum
1973	History of the Grateful Dead, Volume One (Bear's Choice)	Released: July 13, 1973; Label: Warner Bros.; Format: LP	60	—	88	—	—	—	
1973	Wake of the Flood	Released: October 15, 1973; Label: Grateful Dead; Format: LP	18	—	30	—	—	—	
1974	From the Mars Hotel	Released: June 27, 1974; Label: Grateful Dead; Format: LP	16	—	13	—	—	47	
1975	Blues for Allah	Released: September 1, 1975; Label: Grateful Dead; Format: LP	12	—	50	—	—	45	
1976	Steal Your Face	Released: June 26, 1976; Label: Grateful Dead; Format: LP	56	—	96	—	—	42	
1977	Terrapin Station	Released: July 27, 1977; Label: Arista; Format: LP	28	—	51	—	—	30	US: Gold
1978	Shakedown Street	Released: November 15, 1978; Label: Arista; Format: LP	41	—	42	—	—	—	US: Gold
1980	Go to Heaven	Released: April 28, 1980; Label: Arista; Format: LP	23	—	85	—	27	—	
1981	Reckoning	Released: April 1, 1981; Label: Arista; Format: LP	43	—	—	—	—	—	
1981	Dead Set	Released: August 26, 1981; Label: Arista; Format: LP	29	—	—	—	—	—	
1987	In the Dark	Released: July 6, 1987; Label: Arista; Format: CD, LP	6	—	20	—	—	57	US: 2× Platinum; Canada: Platinum
1989	Dylan & the Dead	Released: January 30, 1989; Label: Columbia; Format: CD, LP	37	85	—	55	16	38	US: Gold
1989	Built to Last	Released: October 31, 1989; Label: Arista; Format: CD, LP	27	—	66	—	—	—	US: Gold
1990	Without a Net	Released: September, 1990; Label: Arista; Format: CD, LP	43	—	—	—	—	—	US: Gold
"—" denotes release that did not chart.

== Retrospective live albums ==
=== Traditional releases ===
Year	Title	Album details	Recording date and location	Peak chart positions		Certifications
Year	Title	Album details	Recording date and location	US	US Internet	Certifications
1991	One from the Vault	Released: April 15, 1991; Label: Grateful Dead; Format: CD	August 13, 1975; Great American Music Hall, San Francisco, California	106	—	
1991	Infrared Roses	Released: November 1, 1991; Label: Grateful Dead; Format: CD	1989–1990	—	—	
1992	Two from the Vault	Released: May 1992; Label: Grateful Dead; Format: CD	August 24, 1968; Shrine Theater, Los Angeles, California	119	—	
1994	Grayfolded	Released: 1994; Label: Swell/Artifact; Format: CD	January 20, 1968 – September 13, 1993	—	—	
1995	Hundred Year Hall	Released: Sep 26, 1995; Label: Grateful Dead; Format: CD	April 26, 1972; Jahrhunderthalle, Frankfurt, West Germany	26	—	US: Gold
1996	Dozin' at the Knick	Released: Oct 29, 1996; Label: Grateful Dead; Format: CD	March 24–26, 1990; Knickerbocker Arena, Albany, New York	74	—	US: Gold
1997	Fallout from the Phil Zone	Released: June 17, 1997; Label: Grateful Dead; Format: CD	September 3, 1967 – March 18, 1995	83	—	
1997	Terrapin Station (Limited Edition)	Released: September, 1997; Label: Grateful Dead; Format: CD	March 15, 1990; Capital Centre, Landover, Maryland	—	—	
1997	Live at the Fillmore East 2-11-69	Released: October 1997; Label: Grateful Dead; Format: CD	February 11, 1969; Fillmore East, New York, New York	77	—	
1999	So Many Roads (1965–1995) Sampler	Released: November 7, 1999; Label: Grateful Dead; Format: CD	July 16, 1966 – March 30, 1994	—	—	
2000	View from the Vault	Released: June, 2000; Label: Grateful Dead; Format: CD	July 8, 1990; Three Rivers Stadium, Pittsburgh, Pennsylvania	—	—	
2000	Ladies and Gentlemen... the Grateful Dead	Released: October 10, 2000; Label: Grateful Dead; Format: CD	April 25–29, 1971; Fillmore East, New York, New York	165	—	US: Gold
2001	View from the Vault II	Released: June 8, 2001; Label: Grateful Dead; Format: CD	June 14, 1991; Robert F. Kennedy Stadium, Washington, D.C.	—	—	
2001	Nightfall of Diamonds	Released: September 25, 2001; Label: Grateful Dead; Format: CD	October 16, 1989; Meadowlands Arena, East Rutherford, New Jersey	196	—	
2002	Postcards of the Hanging	Released: March, 2002; Label: Grateful Dead; Format: CD	June 10, 1973 – March 24, 1990	120	264	
2002	Steppin' Out with the Grateful Dead: England '72	Released: July 9, 2002; Label: Grateful Dead; Format: CD	April 7 – May 26, 1972	160	—	
2002	View from the Vault III	Released: July 15, 2002; Label: Grateful Dead; Format: CD	June 16, 1990; Shoreline Amphitheatre, Mountain View, California	—	—	
2002	Go to Nassau	Released: Oct 22, 2002; Label: Grateful Dead; Format: CD	May 15–16, 1980; Nassau Coliseum, Uniondale, New York	—	—	
2003	Birth of the Dead	Released: March 25, 2003; Label: Rhino; Format: CD	November 3, 1965 – April 1967 (Studio Sides); July 1966 (Live Sides), San Francisco, California	—	—	
2003	View from the Vault IV	Released: April 8, 2003; Label: Grateful Dead; Format: CD	July 24, 1987; Oakland Stadium, Oakland, California; July 26, 1987; Anaheim Stadium, Anaheim, California	—	—	
2003	The Closing of Winterland	Released: November 11, 2003; Label: Rhino; Format: CD	December 31, 1978; Winterland Arena, San Francisco, California	—	—	
2004	Rockin' the Rhein with the Grateful Dead	Released: May 25, 2004; Label: Rhino; Format: CD	April 24, 1972; Rheinhalle, Düsseldorf, West Germany	75	75	
2005	The Grateful Dead Movie Soundtrack	Released: March 15, 2005; Label: Rhino; Format: CD	October 16–20, 1974; Winterland Arena, San Francisco, California	—	—	
2005	Rare Cuts and Oddities 1966	Released: March 25, 2005; Label: Grateful Dead; Format: CD	1966	—	—	
2005	Truckin' Up to Buffalo	Released: July 12, 2005; Label: Grateful Dead; Format: CD	July 4, 1989; Rich Stadium, Orchard Park, New York	137	137	
2005	Fillmore West 1969	Released: November 25, 2005; Label: Rhino; Format: CD	February 27 – March 2, 1969; Fillmore West, San Francisco, California	—	—	
2007	Live at the Cow Palace	Released: January 19, 2007; Label: Rhino; Format: CD	December 31, 1976; Cow Palace, Daly City, California	48	48	
2007	Three from the Vault	Released: June 26, 2007; Label: Rhino; Format: CD	February 19, 1971; Capitol Theater, Port Chester, New York	112	112	
2008	Rocking the Cradle: Egypt 1978	Released: September 30, 2008; Label: Rhino; Format: CD	September 15–16, 1978; Sound and Light Theater, Giza, Egypt	35	35	
2009	To Terrapin: Hartford '77	Released: April 7, 2009; Label: Rhino; Format: CD	May 28, 1977; Hartford Civic Center, Hartford, Connecticut	59	152	
2010	Crimson White & Indigo	Released: April 20, 2010; Label: Rhino; Format: CD	July 7, 1989; John F. Kennedy Stadium, Philadelphia, Pennsylvania	—	—	
2011	Europe '72 Volume 2	Released: September 20, 2011; Label: Rhino; Format: CD	April 7 – May 26, 1972	72	—	
2012	Dark Star	Released: April 21, 2012; Label: Rhino; Format: LP	May 4, 1972; Olympia Theatre, Paris, France	—	—	
2012	Spring 1990: So Glad You Made It	Released: September 18, 2012; Label: Rhino; Format: CD	March 16 – April 2, 1990	157	—	
2012	Winterland: May 30th 1971	Released: November 23, 2012; Label: Rhino; Format: LP	May 30, 1971; Winterland Arena, San Francisco, California	—	—	
2013	Sunshine Daydream	Released: September 17, 2013; Label: Rhino; Format: CD, LP	August 27, 1972; Old Renaissance Faire Grounds, Veneta, Oregon	19	—	
2013	Family Dog at the Great Highway, San Francisco, CA 4/18/70	Released: November 29, 2013; Label: Rhino; Format: CD, LP	April 18, 1970; Family Dog at the Great Highway, San Francisco, California	—	—	
2014	Live at Hampton Coliseum	Released: April 19, 2014; Label: Rhino; Format: LP	May 4, 1979; Hampton Coliseum, Hampton, Virginia	—	—	
2014	Wake Up to Find Out	Released: September 9, 2014; Label: Rhino; Format: CD, LP	March 29, 1990; Nassau Coliseum, Uniondale, New York	—	—	
2014	Houston, Texas 11-18-1972	Released: November 28, 2014; Label: Rhino; Format: CD, LP	November 18, 1972; Hofheinz Pavilion, Houston, Texas	—	—	
2015	30 Trips Around the Sun: The Definitive Live Story 1965–1995	Released: September 18, 2015; Label: Rhino; Format: CD	1965–1995	161	—	
2016	Shrine Exposition Hall, Los Angeles, CA 11/10/1967	Released: January 22, 2016; Label: Rhino; Format: LP	November 10, 1967; Shrine Exposition Hall, Los Angeles, California	—	—	
2016	Capitol Theatre, Passaic, NJ, 4/25/77	Released: April 16, 2016; Label: Rhino; Format: LP	April 25, 1977; Capitol Theatre, Passaic, New Jersey	—	—	
2016	Red Rocks: 7/8/78	Released: May 13, 2016; Label: Rhino; Format: CD	July 8, 1978; Red Rocks Amphitheatre, Morrison, Colorado	177	—	
2017	July 29 1966, P.N.E. Garden Aud., Vancouver Canada	Released: April 22, 2017; Label: Rhino; Format: LP	July 29, 1966; P.N.E. Garden Auditorium, Vancouver, British Columbia	—	—	
2017	Cornell 5/8/77	Released: May 5, 2017; Label: Rhino; Format: CD, LP	May 8, 1977; Barton Hall, Ithaca, New York	25	—	
2017	Robert F. Kennedy Stadium, Washington, D.C., July 12 & 13, 1989	Released: November 10, 2017; Label: Rhino; Format: CD	July 12–13, 1989; Robert F. Kennedy Stadium, Washington, D.C.	64	—	
2018	Fillmore West 1969: February 27th	Released: April 21, 2018; Label: Rhino; Format: LP	February 27, 1969; Fillmore West, San Francisco, California	—	—	
2018	Pacific Northwest '73–'74: Believe It If You Need It	Released: September 7, 2018; Label: Rhino; Format: CD	June 22–24, 1973; May 17–21, 1974	—	—	
2018	Portland Memorial Coliseum, Portland, OR, 5/19/74	Released: September 7, 2018; Label: Rhino; Format: LP	May 19, 1974; Portland Memorial Coliseum, Portland, Oregon	—	—	
2018	Playing in the Band, Seattle, Washington, 5/21/74	Released: November 23, 2018; Label: Rhino; Format: LP	May 21, 1974; Hec Edmundson Pavilion, Seattle, Washington	—	—	
2019	The Warfield, San Francisco, California, October 9 & 10, 1980	Released: April 13, 2019; Label: Rhino; Format: CD, LP	October 9–10, 1980; Warfield Theatre, San Francisco, California	84	—	
2019	Fillmore West 1969: February 28th	Released: July 9, 2019; Label: Rhino; Format: LP	February 28, 1969; Fillmore West, San Francisco, California	—	—	
2019	Saint of Circumstance	Released: September 27, 2019; Label: Rhino; Format: CD, LP	June 17, 1991; Giants Stadium, East Rutherford, New Jersey	—	—	
2019	Ready or Not	Released: November 22, 2019; Label: Rhino; Format: CD, LP	June 23, 1992 – April 2, 1995	172	—	
2020	Memorial Auditorium, Buffalo, NY 5/9/77	Released: October 24, 2020; Label: Rhino; Format: LP	May 9, 1977; Buffalo Memorial Auditorium, Buffalo, New York	—	—	
2021	Grateful Dead Origins	Released: January 2021; Label: Rhino; Format: LP	August 21, 1968; Fillmore West, San Francisco, California	—	—	
2021	Fox Theatre, St. Louis, MO 12-10-71	Released: October 1, 2021; Label: Rhino; Format: CD, LP	December 10, 1971; Fox Theatre, St. Louis, Missouri	—	—	
2021	Light into Ashes	Released: October 1, 2021; Label: Rhino; Format: LP	October 18, 1972; Fox Theatre, St. Louis, Missouri	—	—	
2022	Fillmore West 1969: March 1st	Released: January 28, 2022; Label: Rhino; Format: LP	March 1, 1969; Fillmore West, San Francisco, California	—	—	
2022	Lyceum Theatre, London, England 5/26/72	Released: July 29, 2022; Label: Rhino; Format: CD	May 26, 1972; Lyceum Theatre, London, England	166	—	
2022	Madison Square Garden, New York, NY 3/9/81	Released: September 23, 2022; Label: Rhino; Format: CD	March 9, 1981; Madison Square Garden, New York, New York	—	—	
2023	Boston Garden, Boston, MA 5/7/77	Released: April 22, 2023; Label: Rhino; Format: LP	May 7, 1977; Boston Garden, Boston Massachusetts	156	—	
2023	RFK Stadium, Washington, D.C. 6/10/73	Released: June 30, 2023; Label: Rhino; Format: CD, LP	June 10, 1973; Robert F. Kennedy Stadium, Washington, D.C.	—	—	
2023	Fillmore West 1969: March 2nd	Released: November 24, 2023; Label: Rhino; Format: LP	March 2, 1969; Fillmore West, San Francisco, California	—	—	
2024	Duke '78	Released: September 20, 2024; Label: Rhino; Format: CD, LP	April 12, 1978; Cameron Indoor Stadium, Duke University, Durham, North Carolina	—	—	
2024	Veterans Memorial Coliseum, New Haven, CT 5/5/77	Released: November 29, 2024; Label: Rhino; Format: LP	May 5, 1977; Veteran's Memorial Coliseum, New Haven, Connecticut	—	—	
2025	Beacon Theatre, New York, NY 6/14/76	Released: April 12, 2025; Label: Rhino; Format: LP	June 14, 1976; Beacon Theatre, New York, New York	—	—	
2025	The Music Never Stopped	Released: May 30, 2025; Label: Rhino; Format: CD, LP	1969 – 1994	—	—	
2025	The Warfield, San Francisco, California, October 4 & 6, 1980	Released: November 28, 2025; Label: Rhino; Format: CD, LP	October 4 & 6, 1980; Warfield Theatre, San Francisco, California	—	—	
2026	Boston Music Hall, Boston, MA 6/11/76	Released: April 18, 2026; Label: Rhino; Format: LP	June 11, 1976; Boston Music Hall, Boston, Massachusetts	—	—	
2026	Fillmore Auditorium, San Francisco, CA, July 3, 1966	Released: July 3, 2026; Label: Rhino; Format: CD, LP	July 3, 1966; Fillmore Auditorium, San Francisco, California	—	—	
2026	Merriweather 6/30/85	Released: September 18, 2026; Label: Rhino; Format: CD, LP	June 30, 1985; Merriweather Post Pavilion, Columbia, Maryland	—	—	
2026	Carousel Ballroom, San Francisco, CA, 2/14/68	Released: November 27, 2026; Label: Rhino; Format: LP	February 14, 1968; Carousel Ballroom, San Francisco, California	—	—	
"—" denotes release that did not chart.

=== Dick's Picks ===
In the 1990s and 2000s, the Grateful Dead released numerous live concert recordings from their archives in three concurrent series. The "From the Vault" series are remixes of multi-track recordings made at the time of the concerts. The "View from the Vault" series are also multi-track remixes, but are released simultaneously as albums on CD and as concert performance videos on DVD. (The first three volumes were also released on VHS videotape.) Both of these series are included in the "Retrospective" live albums list above.

The third series of concert releases is Dick's Picks, which are based on two-track concert recordings. Unlike multi-track recordings, two-track recordings cannot be remixed, only remastered. Therefore, the sound quality of the Dick's Picks series, while generally very good, is not quite as high as that of the other official releases of live recordings, as explained in the various "caveat emptor" notices on the CD boxes.

The Dick's Picks series, which started in 1993, was named after Grateful Dead tape vault archivist Dick Latvala. Latvala selected shows with the band's approval and oversaw the production of the albums. After Latvala's death in 1999, David Lemieux became the Dead's tape archivist and took over responsibility for producing subsequent Dick's Picks releases, as well as his own Dave's Picks series. Latvala and Lemieux worked with recording engineer Jeffrey Norman, who was in charge of mastering the CDs. The last Dick's Pick's compilation was released in 2005.

Volume 15 and later were released in HDCD format. This provides enhanced sound quality when played on CD players with HDCD capability, and is fully compatible with regular CD players.

Year	Title	Album details	Recording date and location
1993	Dick's Picks Volume 1	Released: October 31, 1993; Label: Grateful Dead; Format: CD, LP	December 19, 1973; Curtis Hixon Hall, Tampa, Florida
1995	Dick's Picks Volume 2	Released: March 1995; Label: Grateful Dead; Format: CD, LP	October 31, 1971; Ohio Theatre, Columbus, Ohio
1995	Dick's Picks Volume 3	Released: November 7, 1995; Label: Grateful Dead; Format: CD, LP	May 22, 1977; Hollywood Sportatorium, Pembroke Pines, Florida
1996	Dick's Picks Volume 4	Released: February 23, 1996; Label: Grateful Dead; Format: CD, LP	February 13–14, 1970; Fillmore East, New York, New York
1996	Dick's Picks Volume 5	Released: May 30, 1996; Label: Grateful Dead; Format: CD, LP	December 26, 1979; Oakland Auditorium, Oakland, California
1996	Dick's Picks Volume 6	Released: October 7, 1996; Label: Grateful Dead; Format: CD, LP	October 14, 1983; Hartford Civic Center, Hartford, Connecticut
1997	Dick's Picks Volume 7	Released: March 4, 1997; Label: Grateful Dead; Format: CD	September 9–11, 1974; Alexandra Palace, London, England
1997	Dick's Picks Volume 8	Released: June 14, 1997; Label: Grateful Dead; Format: CD, LP	May 2, 1970; Harpur College, Binghamton, New York
1997	Dick's Picks Volume 9	Released: October 18, 1997; Label: Grateful Dead; Format: CD	September 16, 1990; Madison Square Garden, New York, New York
1998	Dick's Picks Volume 10	Released: February 26, 1998; Label: Grateful Dead; Format: CD	December 29, 1977; Winterland Arena, San Francisco, California
1998	Dick's Picks Volume 11	Released: June 9, 1998; Label: Grateful Dead; Format: CD	September 27, 1972; Stanley Theater, Jersey City, New Jersey
1998	Dick's Picks Volume 12	Released: October 15, 1998; Label: Grateful Dead; Format: CD	June 26, 1974; Providence Civic Center, Providence, Rhode Island; June 28, 1974; Boston Garden, Boston, Massachusetts
1999	Dick's Picks Volume 13	Released: March 5, 1999; Label: Grateful Dead; Format: CD	May 6, 1981; Nassau Coliseum, Uniondale, New York
1999	Dick's Picks Volume 14	Released: June 18, 1999; Label: Grateful Dead; Format: CD	November 30 & December 2, 1973; Boston Music Hall, Boston, Massachusetts
1999	Dick's Picks Volume 15	Released: October 18, 1999; Label: Grateful Dead; Format: CD	September 3, 1977; Raceway Park, Englishtown, New Jersey
2000	Dick's Picks Volume 16	Released: March 2000; Label: Grateful Dead; Format: CD	November 8, 1969; Fillmore West, San Francisco, California
2000	Dick's Picks Volume 17	Released: April 28, 2000; Label: Grateful Dead; Format: CD	September 25, 1991; Boston Garden, Boston, Massachusetts
2000	Dick's Picks Volume 18	Released: June 2000; Label: Grateful Dead; Format: CD	February 3, 1978; Dane County Coliseum, Madison, Wisconsin; February 4, 1978; Milwaukee Auditorium, Milwaukee, Wisconsin; February 5, 1978; UNI-Dome, Cedar Falls, Iowa
2000	Dick's Picks Volume 19	Released: October 23, 2000; Label: Grateful Dead; Format: CD, LP	October 19, 1973; Oklahoma State Fair Arena, Oklahoma City, Oklahoma
2001	Dick's Picks Volume 20	Released: January 23, 2001; Label: Grateful Dead; Format: CD	September 25, 1976; Capital Centre, Landover, Maryland; September 28, 1976; Onondaga County War Memorial, Syracuse, New York
2001	Dick's Picks Volume 21	Released: March 20, 2001; Label: Grateful Dead; Format: CD	November 1, 1985; Richmond Coliseum, Richmond, Virginia
2001	Dick's Picks Volume 22	Released: June 2001; Label: Grateful Dead; Format: CD	February 23 & 24, 1968; Kings Beach Bowl, Kings Beach, California
2001	Dick's Picks Volume 23	Released: October 16, 2001; Label: Grateful Dead; Format: CD	September 17, 1972; Baltimore Civic Center, Baltimore, Maryland
2002	Dick's Picks Volume 24	Released: February 11, 2002; Label: Grateful Dead; Format: CD, LP	March 23, 1974; Cow Palace, Daly City, California
2002	Dick's Picks Volume 25	Released: July 20, 2002; Label: Grateful Dead; Format: CD	May 10, 1978; Veterans Memorial Coliseum, New Haven, Connecticut; May 11, 1978; Springfield Civic Center, Springfield, Massachusetts
2002	Dick's Picks Volume 26	Released: October 1, 2002; Label: Grateful Dead; Format: CD, LP	April 26, 1969; Electric Theater, Chicago, Illinois; April 27, 1969; Labor Temple, Minneapolis, Minnesota
2003	Dick's Picks Volume 27	Released: January 17, 2003; Label: Grateful Dead; Format: CD	December 16, 1992; Oakland-Alameda County Coliseum Arena, Oakland, California
2003	Dick's Picks Volume 28	Released: April 20, 2003; Label: Grateful Dead; Format: CD	February 26, 1973; Pershing Municipal Auditorium, Lincoln, Nebraska; February 28, 1973; Salt Palace, Salt Lake City, Utah
2003	Dick's Picks Volume 29	Released: July 22, 2003; Label: Grateful Dead; Format: CD	May 19, 1977; Fox Theatre, Atlanta, Georgia; May 21, 1977; Lakeland Civic Center Arena, Lakeland, Florida
2003	Dick's Picks Volume 30	Released: October 30, 2003; Label: Grateful Dead; Format: CD	March 25 & 28, 1972; Academy of Music, New York, New York
2004	Dick's Picks Volume 31	Released: March 16, 2004; Label: Grateful Dead; Format: CD	August 4–5, 1974; Philadelphia Civic Center, Philadelphia, Pennsylvania; August 6, 1974; Roosevelt Stadium, Jersey City, New Jersey
2004	Dick's Picks Volume 32	Released: July 20, 2004; Label: Grateful Dead; Format: CD	August 7, 1982; Alpine Valley Music Theatre, East Troy, Wisconsin
2004	Dick's Picks Volume 33	Released: November 15, 2004; Label: Grateful Dead; Format: CD, LP	October 9–10, 1976; Oakland Coliseum Stadium, Oakland, California
2005	Dick's Picks Volume 34	Released: February 14, 2005; Label: Grateful Dead; Format: CD, LP	November 2, 1977; Seneca College, Toronto, Ontario, Canada; November 5, 1977; Community War Memorial, Rochester, New York
2005	Dick's Picks Volume 35	Released: June 17, 2005; Label: Grateful Dead; Format: CD	August 6, 1971; Hollywood Palladium, Hollywood, California; August 7, 1971; Golden Hall, San Diego, California; August 24, 1971; Auditorium Theatre, Chicago, Illinois
2005	Dick's Picks Volume 36	Released: October 2005; Label: Grateful Dead; Format: CD, LP	September 21, 1972; The Spectrum, Philadelphia, Pennsylvania

=== Digital downloads ===
In the summer of 2005 the Dead began offering download versions of both their existing live releases, and a new Internet-only series, The Grateful Dead Download Series, that was available through their own online store (which offered the albums in both 256 kbit/s mp3 files and FLAC files – a preferred audio standard for those who archive Dead and other fan-made live recordings on the Internet) and the iTunes Music Store (which offered them in their 256 kbit/s AAC format). Not surprisingly, these Internet-only albums have met with the same success as their CD-based brethren. The Download Series is no longer available for purchase on the Grateful Dead's website. However, they are still available for purchase from the iTunes Music Store as well as from Nugs.net, which offer them in FLAC, Apple Lossless Audio Codec (ALAC) and mp3 formats. Amazon also has them available in mp3 format.

Year	Title	Album details	Recording date and location
2005	Grateful Dead Download Series Volume 1	Released: May 3, 2005; Label: Grateful Dead	April 30, 1977; Palladium, New York, New York
2005	Grateful Dead Download Series Volume 2	Released: June 7, 2005; Label: Grateful Dead	January 18, 1970; Springer's Inn, Portland, Oregon
2005	Grateful Dead Download Series Volume 3	Released: July 5, 2005; Label: Grateful Dead	October 26, 1971; The Palestra, Rochester, New York
2005	Grateful Dead Download Series Volume 4	Released: August 2, 2005; Label: Grateful Dead	June 18, 1976; Capitol Theatre, Passaic, New Jersey
2005	Grateful Dead Download Series Volume 5	Released: September 6, 2005; Label: Grateful Dead	March 27, 1988; Hampton Coliseum, Hampton, Virginia
2005	Grateful Dead Download Series Volume 6	Released: October 4, 2005; Label: Grateful Dead	March 17, 1968; Carousel Ballroom, San Francisco, California
2005	Grateful Dead Download Series Volume 7	Released: November 1, 2005; Label: Grateful Dead	September 3, 1980; Springfield Civic Center Arena, Springfield, Massachusetts; September 4, 1980; Providence Civic Center, Providence, Rhode Island
2005	Grateful Dead Download Series Volume 8	Released: December 6, 2005; Label: Grateful Dead	December 10, 1973; Charlotte Coliseum, Charlotte, North Carolina
2005	Grateful Dead Download Series: Family Dog at the Great Highway	Released: December 6, 2005; Label: Grateful Dead	February 4, 1970; Family Dog at the Great Highway, San Francisco, California
2006	Grateful Dead Download Series Volume 9	Released: January 3, 2006; Label: Grateful Dead	April 2–3, 1989; Civic Arena, Pittsburgh, Pennsylvania
2006	Grateful Dead Download Series Volume 10	Released: February 7, 2006; Label: Grateful Dead	July 21, 1972; Paramount Northwest Theatre, Seattle, Washington
2006	Grateful Dead Download Series Volume 11	Released: March 7, 2006; Label: Grateful Dead	June 20, 1991; Pine Knob Music Theater, Clarkston, Michigan
2006	Grateful Dead Download Series Volume 12	Released: April 4, 2006; Label: Grateful Dead	April 17, 1969; Washington University in St. Louis, Missouri
2008	Road Trips Full Show: Spectrum 11/5/79	Released: September 10, 2008; Label: Grateful Dead	November 5, 1979; The Spectrum, Philadelphia, Pennsylvania
2008	Road Trips Full Show: Spectrum 11/6/79	Released: September 10, 2008; Label: Grateful Dead	November 6, 1979; The Spectrum, Philadelphia, Pennsylvania
2020	Workingman's Dead: The Angel's Share	Released: July 1, 2020; Label: Rhino	Outtakes from the Workingman's Dead studio sessions
2020	American Beauty: The Angel's Share	Released: October 15, 2020; Label: Rhino	Outtakes from the American Beauty studio sessions
2023	Wake of the Flood: The Angel's Share	Released: August 18, 2023; Label: Rhino	Outtakes from the Wake of the Flood studio sessions
2024	From the Mars Hotel: The Angel's Share	Released: April 17, 2024; Label: Rhino	Outtakes from the From the Mars Hotel studio sessions
2025	Blues for Allah: The Angel's Share	Released: September 25, 2025; Label: Rhino	Outtakes from the Blues For Allah studio sessions

=== Road Trips ===
The Road Trips series of albums is the successor to Dick's Picks. The series started after the Grateful Dead signed a ten-year contract with Rhino Records to release the band's archival material. The Road Trips releases are created using two-track concert recordings, but unlike Dick's Picks they each contain material from multiple concerts of a tour. The production of the CDs is supervised by vault archivist David Lemieux, with mastering by sound engineer Jeffrey Norman. Like the later Dick's Picks, the Road Trips albums are released in HDCD format.

Year	Title	Album details	Recording date and location
2007	Road Trips Volume 1 Number 1	Released: November 5, 2007; Label: Grateful Dead; Format: CD	October 25 – November 10, 1979
2008	Road Trips Volume 1 Number 2	Released: February 4, 2008; Label: Grateful Dead; Format: CD	October 7–16, 1977
2008	Road Trips Volume 1 Number 3	Released: June 9, 2008; Label: Grateful Dead; Format: CD	July 31, 1971; Yale Bowl, New Haven, Connecticut; August 23, 1971; Auditorium Theatre, Chicago, Illinois
2008	Road Trips Volume 1 Number 4	Released: September 30, 2008; Label: Grateful Dead; Format: CD	October 21–22, 1978; Winterland Arena, San Francisco, California
2008	Road Trips Volume 2 Number 1	Released: December 10, 2008; Label: Grateful Dead; Format: CD	September 18–20, 1990; Madison Square Garden, New York, New York
2009	Road Trips Volume 2 Number 2	Released: March 21, 2009; Label: Grateful Dead; Format: CD	February 14, 1968; Carousel Ballroom, San Francisco, California
2009	Road Trips Volume 2 Number 3	Released: June 18, 2009; Label: Grateful Dead; Format: CD	June 16, 1974; Iowa State Fairgrounds, Des Moines, Iowa; June 18, 1974; Freedom Hall, Louisville, Kentucky
2009	Road Trips Volume 2 Number 4	Released: August 25, 2009; Label: Grateful Dead; Format: CD	May 26–27, 1993; Cal Expo Amphitheatre, Sacramento, California
2009	Road Trips Volume 3 Number 1	Released: November 10, 2009; Label: Grateful Dead; Format: CD	December 28, 1979; Oakland Auditorium, Oakland, California
2010	Road Trips Volume 3 Number 2	Released: February 24, 2010; Label: Grateful Dead; Format: CD	November 15, 1971; Austin Municipal Auditorium, Austin, Texas
2010	Road Trips Volume 3 Number 3	Released: June 14, 2010; Label: Grateful Dead; Format: CD	May 15, 1970; Fillmore East, New York, New York
2010	Road Trips Volume 3 Number 4	Released: September 7, 2010; Label: Grateful Dead; Format: CD	May 6, 1980; Pennsylvania State University, State College, Pennsylvania; May 7, 1980; Barton Hall, Cornell University, Ithaca, New York
2010	Road Trips Volume 4 Number 1	Released: November 16, 2010; Label: Grateful Dead; Format: CD	May 23–24, 1969; Hollywood Seminole Indian Reservation, West Hollywood, Florida
2011	Road Trips Volume 4 Number 2	Released: February 1, 2011; Label: Rhino; Format: CD	March 31 – April 1, 1988; Meadowlands Arena, East Rutherford, New Jersey
2011	Road Trips Volume 4 Number 3	Released: April 26, 2011; Label: Rhino; Format: CD	November 21, 1973; Denver Coliseum, Denver, Colorado
2011	Road Trips Volume 4 Number 4	Released: August 1, 2011; Label: Rhino; Format: CD	April 6, 1982; The Spectrum, Philadelphia, Pennsylvania
2011	Road Trips Volume 4 Number 5	Released: November 1, 2011; Label: Rhino; Format: CD	June 9, 1976; Boston Music Hall, Boston, Massachusetts

=== Dave's Picks ===
The Dave's Picks albums followed the Road Trips series. They are named after Grateful Dead tape archivist David Lemieux.

Year	Title	Album details	Recording date and location	Peak chart positions
Year	Title	Album details	Recording date and location	US
2012	Dave's Picks Volume 1	Released: February 1, 2012; Label: Rhino; Format: CD, LP	May 25, 1977; The Mosque, Richmond, Virginia	—
2012	Dave's Picks Volume 2	Released: May 1, 2012; Label: Rhino; Format: CD	July 31, 1974; Dillon Stadium, Hartford, Connecticut	145
2012	Dave's Picks Volume 3	Released: August 1, 2012; Label: Rhino; Format: CD	October 22, 1971; Auditorium Theatre, Chicago, Illinois	34
2012	Dave's Picks Volume 4	Released: November 1, 2012; Label: Rhino; Format: CD	September 24, 1976; College of William & Mary, Williamsburg, Virginia	—
2013	Dave's Picks Volume 5	Released: February 1, 2013; Label: Rhino; Format: CD	November 17, 1973; Pauley Pavilion, Los Angeles, California	38
2013	Dave's Picks Volume 6	Released: May 1, 2013; Label: Rhino; Format: CD	February 2, 1970; Fox Theatre, St. Louis, Missouri; December 20, 1969; Fillmore Auditorium, San Francisco, California	32
2013	Dave's Picks Volume 7	Released: August 1, 2013; Label: Rhino; Format: CD	April 24, 1978; Horton Fieldhouse, Normal, Illinois	26
2013	Dave's Picks Volume 8	Released: November 1, 2013; Label: Rhino; Format: CD	November 30, 1980; Fox Theatre, Atlanta, Georgia	—
2014	Dave's Picks Volume 9	Released: February 1, 2014; Label: Rhino; Format: CD	May 14, 1974; Adams Field House, Missoula, Montana	30
2014	Dave's Picks Volume 10	Released: May 1, 2014; Label: Rhino; Format: CD	December 12, 1969; Thelma Theater, Los Angeles, California	—
2014	Dave's Picks Volume 11	Released: August 1, 2014; Label: Rhino; Format: CD	November 17, 1972; Century II Convention Hall, Wichita, Kansas	—
2014	Dave's Picks Volume 12	Released: November 1, 2014; Label: Rhino; Format: CD	November 4, 1977; Colgate University, Hamilton, New York	29
2015	Dave's Picks Volume 13	Released: February 1, 2015; Label: Rhino; Format: CD	February 24, 1974; Winterland Arena, San Francisco, California	32
2015	Dave's Picks Volume 14	Released: May 1, 2015; Label: Rhino; Format: CD	March 26, 1972; Academy of Music, New York, New York	31
2015	Dave's Picks Volume 15	Released: August 1, 2015; Label: Rhino; Format: CD	April 22, 1978; Municipal Auditorium, Nashville, Tennessee	—
2015	Dave's Picks Volume 16	Released: November 1, 2015; Label: Rhino; Format: CD	March 28, 1973; Springfield Civic Center, Springfield, Massachusetts	34
2016	Dave's Picks Volume 17	Released: February 1, 2016; Label: Rhino; Format: CD	July 19, 1974; Selland Arena, Fresno, California	31
2016	Dave's Picks Volume 18	Released: May 1, 2016; Label: Rhino; Format: CD	July 17, 1976; Orpheum Theatre, San Francisco, California	38
2016	Dave's Picks Volume 19	Released: August 1, 2016; Label: Rhino; Format: CD	January 23, 1970; Honolulu Civic Auditorium, Honolulu, Hawaii	19
2016	Dave's Picks Volume 20	Released: November 1, 2016; Label: Rhino; Format: CD	December 9, 1981; CU Events Center, Boulder, Colorado	39
2017	Dave's Picks Volume 21	Released: February 1, 2017; Label: Rhino; Format: CD	April 2, 1973; Boston Garden, Boston, Massachusetts	26
2017	Dave's Picks Volume 22	Released: May 1, 2017; Label: Rhino; Format: CD	December 7, 1971; Felt Forum, New York, New York	34
2017	Dave's Picks Volume 23	Released: August 1, 2017; Label: Rhino; Format: CD	January 22, 1978; McArthur Court, Eugene, Oregon	30
2017	Dave's Picks Volume 24	Released: November 1, 2017; Label: Rhino; Format: CD	August 25, 1972; Berkeley Community Theatre, Berkeley, California	91
2018	Dave's Picks Volume 25	Released: January 26, 2018; Label: Rhino; Format: CD	November 6, 1977; Broome County Arena, Binghamton, New York	27
2018	Dave's Picks Volume 26	Released: April 27, 2018; Label: Rhino; Format: CD	November 17, 1971; Albuquerque Civic Auditorium, Albuquerque, New Mexico	26
2018	Dave's Picks Volume 27	Released: July 27, 2018; Label: Rhino; Format: CD	September 2, 1983; Boise State University Pavilion, Boise, Idaho	29
2018	Dave's Picks Volume 28	Released: October 26, 2018; Label: Rhino; Format: CD	June 17, 1976; Capitol Theatre, Passaic, New Jersey	35
2019	Dave's Picks Volume 29	Released: February 1, 2019; Label: Rhino; Format: CD	February 26, 1977; Swing Auditorium, San Bernardino, California	26
2019	Dave's Picks Volume 30	Released: May 3, 2019; Label: Rhino; Format: CD	January 2, 1970; Fillmore East, New York, New York	30
2019	Dave's Picks Volume 31	Released: July 26, 2019; Label: Rhino; Format: CD	December 3, 1979; Uptown Theatre, Chicago, Illinois	26
2019	Dave's Picks Volume 32	Released: November 1, 2019; Label: Rhino; Format: CD	March 24, 1973; The Spectrum, Philadelphia, Pennsylvania	22
2020	Dave's Picks Volume 33	Released: January 31, 2020; Label: Rhino; Format: CD	October 29, 1977; Chick Evans Field House, DeKalb, Illinois	45
2020	Dave's Picks Volume 34	Released: May 1, 2020; Label: Rhino; Format: CD	June 23, 1974; Jai-Alai Fronton, Miami, Florida	22
2020	Dave's Picks Volume 35	Released: July 31, 2020; Label: Rhino; Format: CD	April 20, 1984; Philadelphia Civic Center, Philadelphia, Pennsylvania	30
2020	Dave's Picks Volume 36	Released: October 30, 2020; Label: Rhino; Format: CD	March 26–27, 1987; Hartford Civic Center, Hartford, Connecticut	25
2021	Dave's Picks Volume 37	Released: January 29, 2021; Label: Rhino; Format: CD	April 15, 1978; College of William & Mary, Williamsburg, Virginia	19
2021	Dave's Picks Volume 38	Released: April 30, 2021; Label: Rhino; Format: CD	September 8, 1973; Nassau Coliseum, Uniondale, New York	25
2021	Dave's Picks Volume 39	Released: July 30, 2021; Label: Rhino; Format: CD	April 26, 1983; The Spectrum, Philadelphia, Pennsylvania	16
2021	Dave's Picks Volume 40	Released: October 29, 2021; Label: Rhino; Format: CD	July 18–19, 1990; Deer Creek Music Center, Noblesville, Indiana	13
2022	Dave's Picks Volume 41	Released: January 28, 2022; Label: Rhino; Format: CD	May 26, 1977; Baltimore Civic Center, Baltimore, Maryland	13
2022	Dave's Picks Volume 42	Released: April 29, 2022; Label: Rhino; Format: CD	February 23, 1974; Winterland Arena, San Francisco, California	12
2022	Dave's Picks Volume 43	Released: July 29, 2022; Label: Rhino; Format: CD	November 2, 1969; Family Dog at the Great Highway, San Francisco, California; December 26, 1969; McFarlin Auditorium, Dallas, Texas	11
2022	Dave's Picks Volume 44	Released: October 28, 2022; Label: Rhino; Format: CD	June 23, 1990; Autzen Stadium, Eugene, Oregon	13
2023	Dave's Picks Volume 45	Released: January 27, 2023; Label: Rhino; Format: CD	October 1–2, 1977; Paramount Theatre, Portland, Oregon	18
2023	Dave's Picks Volume 46	Released: April 28, 2023; Label: Rhino; Format: CD	September 9, 1972; Hollywood Palladium, Los Angeles, California	28
2023	Dave's Picks Volume 47	Released: July 28, 2023; Label: Rhino; Format: CD	December 9, 1979; Kiel Auditorium, St. Louis, Missouri	27
2023	Dave's Picks Volume 48	Released: October 27, 2023; Label: Rhino; Format: CD	November 20, 1971; Pauley Pavilion, Los Angeles, California	33
2024	Dave's Picks Volume 49	Released: January 26, 2024; Label: Rhino; Format: CD	April 27–28, 1985; Frost Amphitheater, Stanford, California	25
2024	Dave's Picks Volume 50	Released: April 26, 2024; Label: Rhino; Format: CD	May 3, 1977; The Palladium, New York, New York	32
2024	Dave's Picks Volume 51	Released: July 26, 2024; Label: Rhino; Format: CD	April 13, 1971; Scranton Catholic Youth Center, Scranton, Pennsylvania	31
2024	Dave's Picks Volume 52	Released: October 25, 2024; Label: Rhino; Format: CD	September 11, 1983; The Downs at Santa Fe, Santa Fe, New Mexico	36
2025	Dave's Picks Volume 53	Released: January 31, 2025; Label: Rhino; Format: CD	October 2, 1976; Riverfront Coliseum, Cincinnati, Ohio	35
2025	Dave's Picks Volume 54	Released: April 25, 2025; Label: Rhino; Format: CD	March 26, 1973; Baltimore Civic Center, Baltimore, Maryland	35
2025	Dave's Picks Volume 55	Released: July 25, 2025; Label: Rhino; Format: CD	October 28, 1990; Le Zénith, Paris, France	28
2025	Dave's Picks Volume 56	Released: October 31, 2025; Label: Rhino; Format: CD	March 20–21, 1981; Rainbow Theatre, London, England	25
2026	Dave's Picks Volume 57	Released: January 30, 2026; Label: Rhino; Format: CD	February 1, 1978; Uptown Theatre, Chicago, Illinois	—
2026	Dave's Picks Volume 58	Released: May 1, 2026; Label: Rhino; Format: CD	December 18, 1973; Curtis Hixon Hall, Tampa, Florida	—
2026	Dave's Picks Volume 59	Released: July 31, 2026; Label: Rhino; Format: CD	September 26, 1991; Boston Garden, Boston, Massachusetts	—
2026	Dave's Picks Volume 60	Released: October 30, 2026; Label: Rhino; Format: CD	April 13 – 14, 1984; Hampton Coliseum, Hampton, Virginia	—
2027	Dave's Picks Volume 61	Released: January 29, 2027; Label: Rhino; Format: CD	May 25, 1974; UCSB Campus Stadium, Santa Barbara, California	—

=== Unauthorized legal releases ===
These albums are not bootlegs. They were released legally, but without the band's consent or cooperation.

Year	Title	Album details	Recording date and location	Peak chart positions
Year	Title	Album details	Recording date and location	US
1970	Vintage Dead	Released: October 1970; Label: Sunflower; Format: LP	Autumn 1966; Avalon Ballroom, San Francisco	127
1971	Historic Dead	Released: June 1971; Label: Sunflower; Format: LP	Autumn 1966; Avalon Ballroom, San Francisco	154

== Box sets ==
=== Concert box sets ===
Year	Title	Album details	Recording dates and location	Peak chart positions	Certifications
Year	Title	Album details	Recording dates and location	US	Certifications
1999	So Many Roads (1965–1995)	Released: November 7, 1999; Label: Arista; Songs from various concerts on 5 CDs	1965–1995	170	US: Gold
2005	Fillmore West 1969: The Complete Recordings	Released: November 25, 2005; Label: Grateful Dead; Four concerts on 10 CDs	February 27 – March 2, 1969; Fillmore West, San Francisco, California	—	—
2008	Winterland 1973: The Complete Recordings	Released: April 1, 2008; Label: Grateful Dead; Three concerts on 9 CDs	November 9–11, 1973; Winterland Arena, San Francisco, California	—	—
2009	Winterland June 1977: The Complete Recordings	Released: October 1, 2009; Label: Grateful Dead; Three concerts on 9 CDs	June 7–9, 1977; Winterland Arena, San Francisco, California	—	—
2010	Formerly the Warlocks	Released: September 7, 2010; Label: Grateful Dead; Two concerts on 6 CDs	October 8–9, 1989; Hampton Coliseum, Hampton, Virginia	—	—
2011	Europe '72: The Complete Recordings	Released: September 1, 2011; Label: Rhino; Twenty-two concerts on 73 CDs	April 7 – May 26, 1972 Note: Each of the 22 concerts was also released as a separate album.	193	US: Gold
2012	Spring 1990	Released: August 31, 2012; Label: Rhino; Six concerts on 18 CDs	March 16 – April 2, 1990	—	—
2013	May 1977	Released: June 11, 2013; Label: Rhino; Five concerts on 14 CDs	May 11–17, 1977	—	—
2014	Spring 1990 (The Other One)	Released: September 9, 2014; Label: Rhino; Eight concerts on 23 CDs	March 14 – April 3, 1990	46	—
2015	30 Trips Around the Sun	Released: October 7, 2015; Label: Rhino; Thirty concerts on 80 CDs	1966 – 1995	—	US: Gold
2016	July 1978: The Complete Recordings	Released: May 13, 2016; Label: Rhino; Five concerts on 12 CDs	July 1–8, 1978	62	—
2017	May 1977: Get Shown the Light	Released: May 5, 2017; Label: Rhino; Four concerts on 11 CDs	May 5–9, 1977	33	—
2018	Pacific Northwest '73–'74: The Complete Recordings	Released: September 7, 2018; Label: Rhino; Six concerts on 19 CDs	June 22–26, 1973; May 17–21, 1974	88	—
2019	Giants Stadium 1987, 1989, 1991	Released: September 27, 2019; Label: Rhino; Five concerts on 14 CDs	July 12, 1987; July 9–10, 1989; June 16–17, 1991; Giants Stadium, East Rutherford, New Jersey	118	—
2020	June 1976	Released: March 20, 2020; Label: Rhino; Five concerts on 15 CDs	June 10–19, 1976	90	—
2021	Listen to the River: St. Louis '71 '72 '73	Released: October 8, 2021; Label: Rhino; Seven concerts on 20 CDs	December 9–10, 1971; October 17–19, 1972; Fox Theatre, St. Louis, Missouri; October 29–30, 1973; Kiel Auditorium, St. Louis, Missouri	122	—
2022	Lyceum '72: The Complete Recordings	Released: July 29, 2022; Label: Rhino; Four concerts on 24 LPs	May 23–26, 1972; Lyceum Theatre, London, England	—	—
2022	In and Out of the Garden: Madison Square Garden '81, '82, '83	Released: September 23, 2022; Label: Rhino; Six concerts on 17 CDs	March 9–10, 1981; September 20–21, 1982; October 11–12, 1983; Madison Square Garden, New York, New York	159	—
2023	Here Comes Sunshine 1973	Released: June 30, 2023; Label: Rhino; Five concerts on 17 CDs	May 13 – June 10, 1973	—	—
2024	Friend of the Devils: April 1978	Released: September 20, 2024; Label: Rhino; Eight concerts on 19 CDs	April 6–16, 1978	196	—
2025	Enjoying the Ride	Released: May 30, 2025; Label: Rhino; Seventeen concerts and several partial concerts on 60 CDs	1969 – 1994	—	—
2026	Summer Magic 1985	Released: September 18, 2026; Label: Rhino; Seven concerts on 20 CDs	June 14 – June 16; June 27 – July 1, 1985	—	—
"—" denotes release that did not chart.

=== Album box sets ===
Year	Title	Album details	Peak chart positions	Certifications
Year	Title	Album details	US	Certifications
1987	Dead Zone: The Grateful Dead CD Collection (1977–1987)	Released: 1987; Label: Arista; Six albums on 6 CDs	—	
2001	The Golden Road (1965–1973)	Released: October 16, 2001; Label: Rhino; Ten albums on 12 CDs	191	US: Gold
2004	Beyond Description (1973–1989)	Released: October 26, 2004; Label: Rhino; Ten albums on 12 CDs	—	
2010	The Warner Bros. Studio Albums	Released: September 21, 2010; Label: Rhino; Five albums on 5 LPs	—	
2012	All the Years Combine: The DVD Collection	Released: April 17, 2012; Label: Shout! Factory; Twelve videos on 14 DVDs	—	CAN: Platinum
2017	Grateful Dead Records Collection	Released: November 24, 2017; Label: Rhino; Four albums on 5 LPs	—	
2020	The Story of the Grateful Dead	Released: November 2020; Label: Vinyl Me, Please; Eight albums on 14 LPs	—	
"—" denotes release that did not chart.

== Compilation albums ==
Year	Title	Album details	Peak chart positions	Certifications
Year	Title	Album details	US	Certifications
1974	Skeletons from the Closet: The Best of Grateful Dead	Released: February 1974; Label: Warner Bros.; Format: LP	75	US: 4× Platinum
1977	What a Long Strange Trip It's Been	Released: September 1, 1977; Label: Warner Bros.; Format: LP	121	US: Platinum
1996	The Arista Years	Released: October 15, 1996; Label: Arista; Format: CD	95	
1997	Selections From the Arista Years	Released: January 13, 1997; Label: Arista; Format: CD	—	
2003	The Very Best of Grateful Dead	Released: September 16, 2003; Label: Rhino; Format: CD	69	
2011	Flashback with the Grateful Dead	Released: April 5, 2011; Label: Flashback; Format: CD	—	
2015	The Best of the Grateful Dead	Released: March 31, 2015; Label: Grateful Dead; Format: CD	—	
2017	Long Strange Trip	Released: May 26, 2017; Label: Rhino; Format: CD	—	
2018	The Best of the Grateful Dead Live	Released: March 23, 2018; Label: Rhino; Format: CD	167	
2019	Sage & Spirit	Released: April 13, 2019; Label: Rhino; Format: LP	—	
2025	On a Back Porch Vol. 1	Released: April 12, 2025; Label: Rhino; Format: LP	—	
2025	Gratest Hits	Released: June 13, 2025; Label: Rhino; Format: CD, LP	—	
2025	On a Back Porch Vol. 2	Released: November 28, 2025; Label: Rhino; Format: LP	—	
2026	On a Back Porch Vol. 3	Released: April 18, 2026; Label: Rhino; Format: LP	—	
2026	On a Back Porch Vol. 4	Released: November 27, 2026; Label: Rhino; Format: LP	—	

== Live albums by recording date ==
Following is a list of Grateful Dead live albums in recording date order. The dates listed are the principal recording dates and do not include bonus tracks or bonus discs.

- Rare Cuts and Oddities 1966 (live tracks) – February–July 1966
- Birth of the Dead (disc two) – July 1966
- Fillmore Auditorium, San Francisco, CA, July 3, 1966 – July 3, 1966
- 30 Trips Around the Sun – July 3, 1966 – February 21, 1995
- 30 Trips Around the Sun: The Definitive Live Story 1965–1995 – July 3, 1966 – February 21, 1995
- So Many Roads (1965–1995) (live tracks) – July 16, 1966 – July 9, 1995
- So Many Roads (1965–1995) Sampler (live tracks) – July 16, 1966 – March 30, 1994
- July 29 1966, P.N.E. Garden Aud., Vancouver Canada – July 29, 1966
- The Grateful Dead (50th Anniversary Deluxe Edition – disc 2) – July 29–30, 1966
- Vintage Dead – Late 1966
- Historic Dead – Late 1966
- Fallout from the Phil Zone – September 3, 1967 – March 18, 1995
- Anthem of the Sun (50th Anniversary Deluxe Edition – disc 2) – October 22, 1967
- Shrine Exposition Hall, Los Angeles, CA 11/10/1967 – November 10, 1967
- Anthem of the Sun (live material) – November 10, 1967 – March 31, 1968
- Grayfolded – January 20, 1968 – September 13, 1993
- Road Trips Volume 2 Number 2 – February 14, 1968
- Carousel Ballroom, San Francisco, CA, 2/14/68 – February 14, 1968
- Dick's Picks Volume 22 – February 23–24, 1968
- Grateful Dead Download Series Volume 6 – March 17, 1968
- Grateful Dead Origins – August 21, 1968
- Two from the Vault – August 24, 1968
- Aoxomoxoa (50th Anniversary Deluxe Edition – disc 2) – January 24–26, 1969
- Live/Dead – January 26 – March 2, 1969
- Live at the Fillmore East 2-11-69 – February 11, 1969
- Fillmore West 1969: The Complete Recordings – February 27 – March 2, 1969
- Fillmore West 1969 – February 27 – March 2, 1969
- Fillmore West 1969: February 27th – February 27, 1969
- Fillmore West 1969: February 28th – February 28, 1969
- Fillmore West 1969: March 1st – March 1, 1969
- Fillmore West 1969: March 2nd – March 2, 1969
- Grateful Dead Download Series Volume 12 – April 17, 1969
- Dick's Picks Volume 26 – April 26–27, 1969
- Road Trips Volume 4 Number 1 – May 23–24, 1969
- Enjoying the Ride – June 5, 1969 – October 3, 1994
- The Music Never Stopped – June 5, 1969 – October 3, 1994
- Dave's Picks Volume 43 – November 2 and December 26, 1969
- Dick's Picks Volume 16 – November 8, 1969
- Dave's Picks Volume 10 – December 12, 1969
- Dave's Picks Volume 6 – December 20, 1969 – February 2, 1970
- Dave's Picks Volume 30 – January 2, 1970
- Grateful Dead Download Series Volume 2 – January 18, 1970
- Dave's Picks Volume 19 – January 23, 1970
- Grateful Dead Download Series: Family Dog at the Great Highway – February 4, 1970
- History of the Grateful Dead, Volume One (Bear's Choice) – February 13–14, 1970
- Dick's Picks Volume 4 – February 13–14, 1970
- Family Dog at the Great Highway, San Francisco, CA 4/18/70 – April 18, 1970
- Dick's Picks Volume 8 – May 2, 1970
- Road Trips Volume 3 Number 3 – May 15, 1970
- American Beauty (50th Anniversary Deluxe Edition – disc 2 & 3) – February 18, 1971
- Three from the Vault – February 19, 1971
- Workingman's Dead (50th Anniversary Deluxe Edition – disc 2 & 3) – February 21, 1971
- Dave's Picks Volume 51 – April 13, 1971
- Grateful Dead – March 24 – April 29, 1971
- Ladies and Gentlemen... the Grateful Dead – April 25–29, 1971
- Winterland: May 30th 1971 – May 30, 1971
- Grateful Dead (50th Anniversary Deluxe Edition – disc 2) – July 2, 1971
- Road Trips Volume 1 Number 3 – July 31 – August 23, 1971
- Dick's Picks Volume 35 – August 6–24, 1971
- Dave's Picks Volume 3 – October 22, 1971
- Grateful Dead Download Series Volume 3 – October 26, 1971
- Dick's Picks Volume 2 – October 31, 1971
- Road Trips Volume 3 Number 2 – November 15, 1971
- Dave's Picks Volume 26 – November 17, 1971
- Dave's Picks Volume 48 – November 20, 1971
- Dave's Picks Volume 22 – December 6–7, 1971
- Listen to the River: St. Louis '71 '72 '73 – December 9, 1971 – October 30, 1973
- Fox Theatre, St. Louis, MO 12-10-71 – December 10, 1971
- Dick's Picks Volume 30 – March 25 – 28, 1972
- Dave's Picks Volume 14 – March 26, 1972
- Europe '72 – April 7 – May 26, 1972
- Europe '72: The Complete Recordings – April 7 – May 26, 1972
- Europe '72 Volume 2 – April 7 – May 26, 1972
- Steppin' Out with the Grateful Dead: England '72 – April 7 – May 26, 1972
- Rockin' the Rhein with the Grateful Dead – April 24, 1972
- Hundred Year Hall – April 26, 1972
- Dark Star – May 4, 1972
- Lyceum '72: The Complete Recordings – May 23 –26, 1972
- Lyceum Theatre, London, England 5/26/72 – May 26, 1972
- Grateful Dead Download Series Volume 10 – July 21, 1972
- Dave's Picks Volume 24 – August 25, 1972
- Sunshine Daydream – August 27, 1972
- Dave's Picks Volume 46 – September 9, 1972
- Dick's Picks Volume 23 – September 17, 1972
- Dick's Picks Volume 36 – September 21, 1972
- Dick's Picks Volume 11 – September 27, 1972
- Light into Ashes – October 18, 1972
- Dave's Picks Volume 11 – November 17, 1972
- Houston, Texas 11-18-1972 – November 18, 1972
- Dick's Picks Volume 28 – February 26–28, 1973
- Dave's Picks Volume 32 – March 24, 1973
- Dave's Picks Volume 54 – March 26, 1973
- Dave's Picks Volume 16 – March 28, 1973
- Dave's Picks Volume 21 – April 2, 1973
- Here Comes Sunshine 1973 – May 13 – June 10, 1973
- RFK Stadium, Washington, D.C. 6/10/73 – June 10, 1973
- Postcards of the Hanging – June 10, 1973 – March 24, 1990
- Pacific Northwest '73–'74: The Complete Recordings – June 22, 1973 – May 21, 1974
- Pacific Northwest '73–'74: Believe It If You Need It – June 22, 1973 – May 21, 1974
- Dave's Picks Volume 38 – September 8, 1973
- Dick's Picks Volume 19 – October 19, 1973
- Winterland 1973: The Complete Recordings – November 9–11, 1973
- Dave's Picks Volume 5 – November 17, 1973
- Road Trips Volume 4 Number 3 – November 21, 1973
- Dick's Picks Volume 14 – November 30 – December 2, 1973
- Grateful Dead Download Series Volume 8 – December 10, 1973
- Dave's Picks Volume 58 – December 18, 1973
- Dick's Picks Volume 1 – December 19, 1973
- Dave's Picks Volume 42 – February 23, 1974
- Dave's Picks Volume 13 – February 24, 1974
- Dick's Picks Volume 24 – March 23, 1974
- From the Mars Hotel (50th Anniversary Deluxe Edition – disc 2 & 3) – May 12, 1974
- Dave's Picks Volume 9 – May 14, 1974
- Portland Memorial Coliseum, Portland, OR, 5/19/74 – May 19, 1974
- Playing in the Band, Seattle, Washington, 5/21/74 – May 21, 1974
- Dave's Picks Volume 61 – May 25, 1974
- Road Trips Volume 2 Number 3 – June 16–18, 1974
- Dave's Picks Volume 34 – June 23, 1974
- Dick's Picks Volume 12 – June 26–28, 1974
- Dave's Picks Volume 17 – July 19, 1974
- Dave's Picks Volume 2 – July 31, 1974
- Dick's Picks Volume 31 – August 4–6, 1974
- Dick's Picks Volume 7 – September 9–11, 1974
- Steal Your Face – October 16–20, 1974
- The Grateful Dead Movie Soundtrack – October 16–20, 1974
- One From the Vault – August 13, 1975
- Road Trips Volume 4 Number 5 – June 9, 1976
- June 1976 – June 10 – 19, 1976
- Boston Music Hall, Boston, MA 6/11/76 – June 11, 1976
- Beacon Theatre, New York, NY 6/14/76 – June 14, 1976
- Dave's Picks Volume 28 – June 17, 1976
- Grateful Dead Download Series Volume 4 – June 18, 1976
- Dave's Picks Volume 18 – July 17, 1976
- Dave's Picks Volume 4 – September 24, 1976
- Dick's Picks Volume 20 – September 25–28, 1976
- Dave's Picks Volume 53 – October 2, 1976
- Dick's Picks Volume 33 – October 9–10, 1976
- Live at the Cow Palace – December 31, 1976
- Dave's Picks Volume 29 – February 26, 1977
- Capitol Theatre, Passaic, NJ, 4/25/77 – April 25, 1977
- Grateful Dead Download Series Volume 1 – April 30, 1977
- Dave's Picks Volume 50 – May 3, 1977
- May 1977: Get Shown the Light – May 5 – 9, 1977
- Veterans Memorial Coliseum, New Haven, CT 5/5/77 – May 5, 1977
- Boston Garden, Boston, MA 5/7/77 – May 7, 1977
- Cornell 5/8/77 – May 8, 1977
- Memorial Auditorium, Buffalo, NY 5/9/77 – May 9, 1977
- May 1977 – May 11–17, 1977
- Dick's Picks Volume 29 – May 19–21, 1977
- Dick's Picks Volume 3 – May 22, 1977
- Dave's Picks Volume 1 – May 25, 1977
- Dave's Picks Volume 41 – May 26, 1977
- To Terrapin: Hartford '77 – May 28, 1977
- Winterland June 1977: The Complete Recordings – June 7–9, 1977
- Dick's Picks Volume 15 – September 3, 1977
- Dave's Picks Volume 45 – October 1 – 2, 1977
- Road Trips Volume 1 Number 2 – October 7 – 16, 1977
- Dave's Picks Volume 33 – October 29, 1977
- Dave's Picks Volume 12 – November 4, 1977
- Dick's Picks Volume 34 – November 5, 1977
- Dave's Picks Volume 25 – November 6, 1977
- Dick's Picks Volume 10 – December 29, 1977
- Dave's Picks Volume 23 – January 22, 1978
- Dave's Picks Volume 57 – February 1, 1978
- Dick's Picks Volume 18 – February 3–5, 1978
- Friend of the Devils: April 1978 – April 6–16, 1978
- Duke '78 – April 12, 1978
- Dave's Picks Volume 37 – April 15, 1978
- Dave's Picks Volume 15 – April 22, 1978
- Dave's Picks Volume 7 – April 24, 1978
- Dick's Picks Volume 25 – May 10–11, 1978
- July 1978: The Complete Recordings – July 1 – 8, 1978
- Red Rocks: 7/8/78 – July 8, 1978
- Rocking the Cradle: Egypt 1978 – September 15 – 16, 1978
- Road Trips Volume 1 Number 4 – October 21–22, 1978
- The Closing of Winterland – December 31, 1978
- Live at Hampton Coliseum – May 4, 1979
- Road Trips Volume 1 Number 1 – October 25 – November 10, 1979
- Road Trips Full Show: Spectrum 11/5/79 – November 5, 1979
- Road Trips Full Show: Spectrum 11/6/79 – November 6, 1979
- Dave's Picks Volume 31 – December 3, 1979
- Dave's Picks Volume 47 – December 9, 1979
- Dick's Picks Volume 5 – December 26, 1979
- Road Trips Volume 3 Number 1 – December 28, 1979
- Road Trips Volume 3 Number 4 – May 6–7, 1980
- Go to Nassau – May 15–16, 1980
- Grateful Dead Download Series Volume 7 – September 3–4, 1980
- Reckoning – September 25 – October 31, 1980
- Dead Set – September 25 – October 31, 1980
- The Warfield, San Francisco, California, October 4 & 6, 1980 – October 4 & 6, 1980
- The Warfield, San Francisco, California, October 9 & 10, 1980 – October 9 – 10, 1980
- Dave's Picks Volume 8 – November 30, 1980
- Madison Square Garden, New York, NY 3/9/81 – March 9, 1981
- In and Out of the Garden: Madison Square Garden '81, '82, '83 – March 9, 1981 – October 12, 1983
- Dave's Picks Volume 56 – March 20–21, 1981
- Dick's Picks Volume 13 – May 6, 1981
- Dave's Picks Volume 20 – December 9, 1981
- Road Trips Volume 4 Number 4 – April 6, 1982
- Dick's Picks Volume 32 – August 7, 1982
- Dave's Picks Volume 39 – April 26, 1983
- Dave's Picks Volume 27 – September 2, 1983
- Dave's Picks Volume 52 – September 11, 1983
- Dick's Picks Volume 6 – October 14, 1983
- Dave's Picks Volume 60 – April 13 – 14, 1984
- Dave's Picks Volume 35 – April 20, 1984
- Dave's Picks Volume 49 – April 27–28, 1985
- Summer Magic 1985 – June 14 – July 1, 1985
- Merriweather 6/30/85 – June 30, 1985
- Dick's Picks Volume 21 – November 1, 1985
- Dave's Picks Volume 36 – March 26 – 27, 1987
- Dylan & the Dead – July 4–26, 1987
- Giants Stadium 1987, 1989, 1991 – July 12, 1987 – June 17, 1991
- View from the Vault IV – July 24–26, 1987
- Grateful Dead Download Series Volume 5 – March 27, 1988
- Road Trips Volume 4 Number 2 – March 31 – April 1, 1988
- Infrared Roses – 1989–1990
- Grateful Dead Download Series Volume 9 – April 2–3, 1989
- Truckin' Up to Buffalo – July 4, 1989
- Crimson White & Indigo – July 7, 1989
- Robert F. Kennedy Stadium, Washington, D.C., July 12 & 13, 1989 – July 12–13, 1989
- Formerly the Warlocks – October 8–9, 1989
- Without a Net – October 9, 1989 – April 1, 1990
- Nightfall of Diamonds – October 16, 1989
- Spring 1990 (The Other One) – March 14 – April 3, 1990
- Terrapin Station (Limited Edition) – March 15, 1990
- Spring 1990 – March 16 – April 2, 1990
- Spring 1990: So Glad You Made It – March 16 – April 2, 1990
- Dozin' at the Knick – March 24 – 26, 1990
- Wake Up to Find Out – March 29, 1990
- View from the Vault III – June 16, 1990
- Dave's Picks Volume 44 – June 23, 1990
- View from the Vault – July 8, 1990
- Dave's Picks Volume 40 – July 18 – 19, 1990
- Dick's Picks Volume 9 – September 16, 1990
- Road Trips Volume 2 Number 1 – September 18–20, 1990
- Dave's Picks Volume 55 – October 28, 1990
- View from the Vault II – June 14, 1991
- Saint of Circumstance – June 17, 1991
- Grateful Dead Download Series Volume 11 – June 20, 1991
- Dick's Picks Volume 17 – September 25, 1991
- Dave's Picks Volume 59 – September 26, 1991
- Ready or Not – June 23, 1992 – April 2, 1995
- Dick's Picks Volume 27 – December 16, 1992
- Road Trips Volume 2 Number 4 – May 26–27, 1993

== Videos ==
This section does not include the following videos which were also released as audio CDs and are listed in "Retrospective live albums" above:

- View from the Vault
- View from the Vault II
- View from the Vault III
- View from the Vault IV
- The Closing of Winterland
- Truckin' Up to Buffalo
- Rocking the Cradle: Egypt 1978
- Crimson White & Indigo
- Giants Stadium: June 17, 1991

Year	Title	Video details	Recording date and location
1977	The Grateful Dead Movie	Released: June 1, 1977; Studio: Monarch; Format: Film	October 16–20, 1974; Winterland Ballroom, San Francisco, California
1981	Dead Ahead	Released: 1981; Studio: Warner Home Video; Format: VHS, Laserdisc	October 30–31, 1980; Radio City Music Hall, New York City
1987	So Far	Released: 1987; Studio: West Home Video; Format: VHS, Laserdisc	1985
1987	Dead Ringers: The Making of Touch of Grey	Released: 1987; Studio: West Home Video; Format: VHS	1987
1992	Backstage Pass	Released: 1992; Studio: Anubis Films; Format: VHS	Early 1970s – 1992
1992	Infrared Sightings	Released: 1992; Studio: Trigon Productions; Format: VHS, Laserdisc	1989–1990
1996	Ticket to New Year's	Released: October 1, 1996; Studio: Monterey Home Video; Format: VHS, Laserdisc	December 31, 1987; Oakland Coliseum Arena, Oakland, California
1997	Downhill from Here	Released: October 7, 1997; Studio: Monterey Home Video; Format: VHS, Laserdisc	July 17–19, 1989; Alpine Valley Music Theatre, East Troy, Wisconsin
1998	Anthem to Beauty	Released: January 27, 1998; Studio: Rhino Home Video; Format: VHS	(The making of Anthem of the Sun and American Beauty)
2013	Sunshine Daydream	Released: August 1, 2013; Studio: Rhino Entertainment; Format: Film	August 27, 1972; Old Renaissance Faire Grounds, Veneta, Oregon
2017	Long Strange Trip	Released: January 23, 2017; Studio: Amazon Video; Format: Film	

== Singles ==
Year	A-side	B-side	Chart positions				Album
Year	A-side	B-side	US	US Main.	US AC	CAN	Album
1966	"Don't Ease Me In" (later re-recorded for Go to Heaven)	"Stealin'"	—	—	—	—	—
1967	"The Golden Road (To Unlimited Devotion)"	"Cream Puff War"	—	—	—	—	The Grateful Dead
1967	"Viola Lee Blues Part 1" (Japan only)	"Viola Lee Blues Part 2"	—	—	—	—	The Grateful Dead
1968	"Dark Star"	"Born Cross Eyed" (Alternate mix on Anthem of the Sun)	—	—	—	—	—
1969	"Dupree's Diamond Blues" (Promo only)	"Cosmic Charlie"	—	—	—	—	Aoxomoxoa
1969	"China Cat Sunflower" (Japan only)	"St. Stephen"	—	—	—	—	Aoxomoxoa
1970	"Uncle John's Band"	"New Speedway Boogie"	69	—	—	87	Workingman's Dead
1970	"Truckin'"	"Ripple"	64	—	—	—	American Beauty
1972	"One More Saturday Night"	"Bertha"	—	—	—	—	Ace
1972	"Truckin'" (Re-release)	"Johnny B. Goode"	—	—	—	—	American Beauty
1973	"Sugar Magnolia" (Live)	"Mr. Charlie"	91	—	—	—	Europe '72
1973	"Let Me Sing Your Blues Away"	"Here Comes Sunshine"	—	—	—	—	Wake of the Flood
1973	"Eyes of the World"	"Weather Report Part 1"	—	—	—	—	Wake of the Flood
1974	"U.S. Blues"	"Loose Lucy"	—	—	—	—	From the Mars Hotel
1975	"The Music Never Stopped"	"Help on the Way"	81	—	—	—	Blues For Allah
1975	"Franklin's Tower"	"Help on the Way"	—	—	—	—	Blues For Allah
1977	"Dancin' in the Streets"	"Terrapin Station"	—	—	—	—	Terrapin Station
1977	"Passenger" (Promo only)	"Terrapin Station"	—	—	—	—	Terrapin Station
1978	"Good Lovin'"	"Stagger Lee"	—	—	—	94	Shakedown Street
1979	"Shakedown Street"	"France"	—	—	—	—	Shakedown Street
1980	"Alabama Getaway"	"Far from Me"	68	—	—	—	Go To Heaven
1980	"Don't Ease Me In"	"Far from Me"	—	—	—	—	Go To Heaven
1981	"Ripple" (Live; Promo only)	none	—	50	—	—	Reckoning
1981	"Dire Wolf" (Live; Promo only)	none	—	37	—	—	Reckoning
1987	"Touch of Grey"	"My Brother Esau"	9	1	15	17	In The Dark
1987	"Hell in a Bucket" (promo only)	"West L.A. Fadeaway"	—	3	—	—	In The Dark
1987	"Throwing Stones"	"When Push Comes to Shove"	—	15	—	—	In The Dark
1989	"Foolish Heart"	"We Can Run"	—	8	—	72	Built To Last
2013	"Iko Iko" (Live)	(split single c/w Dr. John & Dixie Cups)	—	—	—	—	View from the Vault IV
2017	"Morning Dew" (Live)	none	—	—	—	—	Cornell 5/8/77
2017	"Dancing in the Street" (live)	none	—	—	—	—	Cornell 5/8/77
"—" denotes release that did not chart.

=== 7" Singles Collection ===
In 2017, the Grateful Dead began offering the 27 singles released throughout the band's history on 7-inch colored vinyl, for sale exclusively on their website, dead.net. Each 7-inch vinyl features remastered audio, and packaging designed by artists for each single and B-side.

Year	Title	Release date
2017	"Stealin'" / "Don't Ease Me In"	March 1, 2017
2017	"The Golden Road (To Unlimited Devotion)" / "Cream Puff War"	June 1, 2017
2017	"Dark Star" / "Born Cross-Eyed"	September 1, 2017
2017	"Dupree's Diamond Blues" / "Cosmic Charlie"	December 1, 2017
2018	"Uncle John's Band" / "New Speedway Boogie"	March 1, 2018
2018	"Truckin'" / "Ripple"	June 1, 2018
2018	"Sugar Magnolia" / "Mr. Charlie"	September 1, 2018
2018	"Let Me Sing Your Blues Away" / "Here Comes Sunshine"	December 1, 2018
2019	"Eyes of the World" / "Weather Report Suite, Part 1"	March 1, 2019
2019	"U.S. Blues" / "Loose Lucy"	June 1, 2019
2019	"The Music Never Stopped" / "Help On the Way"	September 1, 2019
2019	"Franklin's Tower" / "Help On the Way"	December 1, 2019
2020	"Dancin' in the Streets" / "Terrapin Station"	March 1, 2020
2020	"Passenger" / "Terrapin Station"	June 1, 2020
2020	"Good Lovin'" / "Stagger Lee"	September 1, 2020
2020	"Shakedown Street" / "France"	December 1, 2020
2021	"Alabama Getaway" / "Far from Me"	March 1, 2021
2021	"Don't Ease Me In" / "Far from Me"	June 1, 2021
2021	"Touch of Grey" / "My Brother Esau"	September 1, 2021
2021	"Throwing Stones (Ashes Ashes)" / "When Push Comes to Shove"	December 1, 2021
2021	"Foolish Heart" / "We Can Run"	December 1, 2021

== Albums and concert films by various artists ==
Performances by the Grateful Dead are included in these albums and concert films by various artists.

Albums
Year	Title	Recorded	Notes
1972	Glastonbury Fayre	June 1971	1 song
1972	Fillmore: The Last Days	June–July 1971	2 songs
2004	Weir Here – The Best of Bob Weir	various dates	11 songs
2005	Garcia Plays Dylan	various dates	4 songs
2009	Woodstock 40 Years On: Back to Yasgur's Farm	August 1969	1 song
2019	Woodstock – Back to the Garden: 50th Anniversary Collection	August 1969	1 song
2019	Woodstock – Back to the Garden: 50th Anniversary Experience	August 1969	3 songs
2019	Woodstock – Back to the Garden: The Definitive 50th Anniversary Archive	August 1969	5 songs

Concert films
Year	Title	Recorded	Notes
1972	Fillmore:The Last Days	June–July 1971	2 songs
2003	Festival Express	June–July 1970	3 songs

== See also ==
- List of songs recorded by Grateful Dead
- Jerry Garcia discography
