= Dick's Picks Volume 16 =

Live album by Grateful Dead
- Released: March 2000
- Recorded: November 7–8, 1969
- Venue: Fillmore Auditorium in San Francisco, California
- Genres: Psychedelic rock, jam
- Length: 191:01
- Label: Grateful Dead

Grateful Dead chronology
So Many Roads (1965–1995) (1999)	Dick's Picks Volume 16 (2000)	Dick's Picks Volume 17 (2000)

Professional ratings
Review scores
Source	Rating
Allmusic	4.5/5 stars
The Music Box	4.5/5 stars
Rolling Stone	4/5 stars

Dick's Picks Volume 16 is the 16th live album in the Dick's Picks series of releases by the Grateful Dead. It was recorded on November 8, 1969 (with one song from the previous night's show) at the Fillmore Auditorium in San Francisco, California. It contains the first live performance of "Cumberland Blues". There is a monologue by someone not in the band during the song "Caution" shortly before the segue to "The Main Ten," who has never been definitively identified.

== Enclosure ==
Included with the release is a single sheet of paper folded in half, yielding a four-page enclosure. The front duplicates the cover of the CD, and the back features a rectangular color photograph of the band on horseback out in the countryside, riding away from the photographer. Under this photo is a white stripe across the page above a circular grey outline of a circular stealie skull with the number 16 inside.

The two pages inside the enclosure contain a single wide black-and-white photograph of the band on horseback and facing the photographer. Above the band members and against a background of trees are lists of the contents of and credits for the release.

== Track listing ==
Disc one

First set:

1. "Good Morning Little Schoolgirl" (Sonny Boy Williamson) – 13:33
2. "Casey Jones" (Jerry Garcia, Robert Hunter) – 4:51
3. "Dire Wolf" (Garcia, Hunter) – 8:24
4. "Easy Wind" (Hunter) – 9:02
5. "China Cat Sunflower" (Garcia, Hunter) – 3:45 →
6. "I Know You Rider" (traditional) – 5:40 →
7. "High Time" (Garcia, Hunter) – 7:48
8. "Mama Tried" (Merle Haggard) – 3:10
9. "Good Lovin' " (Clark, Resnick) – 9:17
10. "Cumberland Blues" (Garcia, Hunter, Phil Lesh) – 4:19

Disc two

Second set:

1. "Dark Star" (Grateful Dead, Hunter) – 14:09 →
2. "The Other One" (Bill Kreutzmann, Bob Weir) – 12:02 →
3. "Dark Star" (Grateful Dead, Hunter) – 1:00 →
4. "Uncle John's Band Jam" (Garcia, Hunter) – 2:33 →
5. "Dark Star" (Grateful Dead, Hunter) – 3:05 →
6. "St. Stephen" (Garcia, Hunter, Lesh) – 7:44 →
7. "The Eleven" (Hunter, Lesh) – 14:01 →

Disc three

Second set, continued:

1. "Caution (Do Not Stop on Tracks)" (Garcia, Kreutzmann, Lesh, Weir) – 17:28 →
2. "The Main Ten" (Hart) – 3:10 →
3. "Caution (Do Not Stop on Tracks)" (Garcia, Kreutzmann, Lesh, Weir) – 9:02 →
4. "Feedback" (Grateful Dead) – 7:57 →
5. "We Bid You Goodnight" (traditional) – 3:28

November 7, 1969:

6. "Turn On Your Love Light" (Malone, Scott) – 25:29

== Personnel ==
Grateful Dead:

- Tom Constanten – keyboards
- Jerry Garcia – lead guitar, vocals
- Mickey Hart – drums
- Bill Kreutzmann – drums
- Phil Lesh – bass, vocals
- Ron "Pigpen" McKernan – harmonica, percussion, vocals
- Bob Weir – rhythm guitar, vocals

Production:

- Dick Latvala, David Lemieux – tape archivists
- Gecko Graphics – design
- Owsley Stanley – recording
- Jeffrey Norman – CD mastering
- John Cutler – magnetic scrutinizer
- Rosie McGee – photography
- Jim Wise – additional editing

== See also ==
- Dick's Picks series
- Grateful Dead discography
