= Dave's Picks Volume 1 =

Live album by Grateful Dead
- Released: February 1, 2012
- Recorded: May 25, 1977
- Genre: Rock
- Length: 168:16
- Label: Rhino
- Producer: Grateful Dead

Grateful Dead chronology
| Road Trips Volume 4 Number 5 (2011) | Dave's Picks Volume 1 (2012) | Dark Star (2012) |

Dave's Picks Volume 1 is a three-CD live album by the rock band the Grateful Dead. It was recorded on May 25, 1977, at the Mosque in Richmond, Virginia, and contains the complete concert from that date. It was released on February 1, 2012.

The album is the first in the Dave's Picks series of Grateful Dead archival releases, the successor to the Road Trips series. It is a limited edition of 12,000 individually numbered copies.

The cover art, by Scott McDougall, depicts the hands of two skeletons in outer space, with clashing drumsticks that resemble lightsabers. This is a nod to the film Star Wars, which was released the same date that the concert was recorded.

Dave's Picks Volume 1 was released as a five-disc vinyl LP on May 1, 2022.

== Critical reception ==
In All About Jazz, Doug Collette wrote, "Though its graphic design and packaging is markedly different than its immediate predecessor of Grateful Dead archive releases, the initial release in Dave's Picks follows proudly in the tradition of the recently concluded Road Trips (as well as the original series to which this one's title refers, Dick's Picks). Overseen by David Lemieux, chief archivist and co-producer of the previous line, as well as the most recent one-off Grateful Dead titles such as Europe '72 Volume 2... the legacy of this iconic band is in the most capable of hands.... The set list is a blueprint for the slow but sure expansion of the musicianship from tight ensemble work ("Mississippi Half Step Uptown Toodleoo"), slightly looser interplay ("They Love Each Other"), the initial group jams apart from solos ("Lazy Lightning" > "Supplication") and the segue that opens them up full-throttle toward "Drums" ("Scarlet Begonias" > "Fire on the Mountain"). Dave's Picks Volume 1 is an audacious but appropriate inauguration for this archive series. It sets the bar high, but that should only insure subsequent releases match the standards the Grateful Dead set for itself."

In Relix, Jeff Tamarkin said, "Most Deadheads, regardless of when they came on board, have a favorite era or specific year, and for many, 1977 is high on the list. Refreshed from a year-plus-long hiatus, and with drummer Mickey Hart now back in the band after his own extended layoff, the Grateful Dead was tight and rejuvenated. This May show from Virginia is a slow-builder, picking up steam midway through the first set with Bob Weir's "Cassidy" and Jerry Garcia's "Loser" and never looking back. The band interplay in the "Lazy Lightning" > "Supplication" jam that follows is where the album kicks into high gear, but it's the second set that's the keeper... As quintessentially delicious as the playing is in Richmond, the true highlights are Garcia and Weir's vocal performances; both were singing with a newly discovered care for nuance that served the music supremely well. Judging by this first release in David Lemieux's new series, Dave's Picks will be a worthy successor to the vaunted Dick's Picks series."

== Track listing ==
Disc 1

First set:

1. "Mississippi Half-Step Uptown Toodeloo" (Jerry Garcia, Robert Hunter) – 10:42
2. "Jack Straw" (Bob Weir, Hunter) – 6:17
3. "They Love Each Other" (Garcia, Hunter) – 7:21
4. "Mexicali Blues" (Weir, John Perry Barlow) – 3:39
5. "Peggy-O" (traditional, arranged by Grateful Dead) – 7:44
6. "Cassidy" (Weir, Barlow) – 5:27
7. "Loser" (Garcia, Hunter) – 8:32
8. "Lazy Lightning" > (Weir, Barlow) – 3:14
9. "Supplication" (Weir, Barlow) – 5:13
10. "Brown-Eyed Women" (Garcia, Hunter) – 6:10
11. "Promised Land" (Chuck Berry) – 4:32

Disc 2

Second set:

1. "Scarlet Begonias" > (Garcia, Hunter) – 10:31
2. "Fire on the Mountain" (Mickey Hart, Hunter) – 11:52
3. "Estimated Prophet" > (Weir, Barlow) – 8:41
4. "He's Gone" > (Garcia, Hunter) – 13:52
5. "Drums" (Hart, Bill Kreutzmann) – 5:25

Disc 3

1. "The Other One" > (Weir, Kreutzmann) – 15:15
2. "Wharf Rat" > (Garcia, Hunter) – 11:10
3. "The Other One" > (Weir, Kreutzmann) – 3:38
4. "The Wheel" > (Garcia, Hunter) – 5:24
5. "Around and Around" (Berry) – 9:10

Encore:

6. "Johnny B. Goode" (Berry) – 4:20

== Personnel ==
Grateful Dead

- Jerry Garcia – lead guitar, vocals
- Donna Jean Godchaux – vocals
- Keith Godchaux – keyboards
- Mickey Hart – drums
- Bill Kreutzmann – drums
- Phil Lesh – electric bass
- Bob Weir – rhythm guitar, vocals

Production

- Produced by Grateful Dead
- Produced for release by David Lemieux
- Executive producer Mark Pinkus
- CD mastering by Jeffrey Norman
- Recorded by Betty Cantor-Jackson
- Archival research by Nicholas Merriwether
- Tape research by Michael Wesley Johnson
- Cover art by Scott McDougall
- Photos by James R. Anderson
- Art direction and design by Steve Vance
- Liner notes essay "Every Time That Wheel Turn 'Round" by Blair Jackson

== See also ==
- Dave's Picks Volume 41 – Recorded the following night on May 26, 1977
