= Dick's Picks Volume 9 =

Live album by Grateful Dead
- Released: October 18, 1997
- Recorded: September 16, 1990
- Genre: Rock
- Length: 179:48
- Label: Grateful Dead

Grateful Dead chronology
Terrapin Station (Limited Edition) (1997)	Dick's Picks Volume 9 (1997)	Live at the Fillmore East 2-11-69 (1997)

Professional ratings
Review scores
Source	Rating
Allmusic	3/5 stars
The Music Box	4/5 stars
Rolling Stone	2/5 stars

Dick's Picks Volume 9 is the ninth live album in the Dick's Picks series of releases by the Grateful Dead. It was recorded on September 16, 1990, at the Madison Square Garden in New York City during the first tour with new keyboardists Vince Welnick and Bruce Hornsby. This CD contains the full show from that night.

Another Grateful Dead album recorded during the same run of concerts at Madison Square Garden is Road Trips Volume 2 Number 1.

== Enclosure ==
Included with the release is a single sheet of paper folded in half, yielding a four-page enclosure. The front duplicates the cover of the CD and the back contains an oval-shaped, purple-tinted, monochrome photograph of the band on stage against a background of clouds that merges seamlessly with the clouds on the cover. The two pages inside contain a wide black-and-white photograph of the entire band on stage along with lists of the contents of and credits for the release.

== Track listing ==
Disc one
First set:

1. "Hell in a Bucket" (Bob Weir, Brent Mydland, John Barlow) – 7:03
2. "Cold Rain & Snow" (traditional, arranged by Grateful Dead) – 6:42
3. "Little Red Rooster" (Willie Dixon) – 10:21
4. "Stagger Lee" (Jerry Garcia, Robert Hunter) – 8:32
5. "Queen Jane Approximately" (Bob Dylan) – 7:47
6. "Tennessee Jed" (Garcia, Hunter) – 10:35
7. "Cassidy" (Weir, Barlow) – 6:26 →
8. "Deal" (Garcia, Hunter) – 9:48

Disc two
Second set:

1. "Samson and Delilah" (traditional, arranged by Weir) – 8:10
2. "Iko Iko" (James Crawford) – 10:15
3. "Looks Like Rain" (Weir, Barlow) – 8:47
4. "He's Gone" (Garcia, Hunter) – 16:26 →
5. "No MSG Jam" (Grateful Dead) – 7:50 →
6. "Drums" (Bill Kreutzmann, Mickey Hart) – 8:59 →

Disc three
Second set, continued:

1. "Space" (Grateful Dead) – 10:49 →
2. "Standing on the Moon" (Garcia, Hunter) – 9:28 →
3. "Lunatic Preserve" (Grateful Dead) – 5:45 →
4. "I Need a Miracle" (Weir, Barlow) – 5:19 →
5. "Morning Dew" (Bonnie Dobson, Tim Rose) – 13:12

Encore:

6. "It's All Over Now, Baby Blue" (Dylan) – 7:35

== Personnel ==
Grateful Dead

- Jerry Garcia – lead guitar, vocals
- Mickey Hart – drums, percussion
- Bruce Hornsby – accordion, piano, synthesizer, vocals
- Phil Lesh – bass guitar, vocals
- Bill Kreutzmann – drums, percussion
- Bob Weir – rhythm guitar, vocals
- Vince Welnick – keyboards, vocals

Production

- Dan Healy – recording
- Dick Latvala – tape archivist
- Jeffrey Norman – CD mastering
- John Cutler – ferromagnetist
- Gecko Graphics – package design
- Susana Millman – photography

== See also ==
- Dick's Picks series
- Grateful Dead discography
