= Dick's Picks Volume 17 =

Live album by Grateful Dead
- Released: April 2000
- Recorded: September 25, 1991
- Venue: Boston Garden
- Genres: Rock, jam
- Length: 194:11
- Label: Grateful Dead

Grateful Dead chronology
Dick's Picks Volume 16 (2000)	Dick's Picks Volume 17 (2000)	Dick's Picks Volume 18 (2000)

Professional ratings
Review scores
Source	Rating
Allmusic	3/5 stars
The Music Box	3.5/5 stars
Rolling Stone	2/5 stars

Dick's Picks Volume 17 is the 17th live album in the Dick's Picks series of releases by the Grateful Dead. It was recorded on September 25, 1991 at the Boston Garden in Boston, Massachusetts, with two additional tracks from the March 31, 1991 show at Greensboro.

The band's concert from the following night at Boston Garden was released in 2026 as Dave's Picks Volume 59.

== Enclosure ==
Included with the release is a single sheet folded in half, yielding a four-page enclosure. The front duplicates the cover of the CD, and the back features a rectangular color photograph of the inside of the venue with the house lights on, after the sound system has been set up but before the audience has arrived. The two pages inside contain a single wide color photograph of the band on stage along with the contents of and credits for the release.

== Track listing ==
Disc one

First set:

1. "Help on the Way" (Jerry Garcia, Robert Hunter) – 4:15 →
2. "Slipknot!" (Garcia, Keith Godchaux, Bill Kreutzmann, Phil Lesh, Bob Weir) – 5:30 →
3. "Franklin's Tower" (Garcia, Kreutzmann, Hunter) – 10:41
4. "Walkin' Blues" (Son House) – 6:30
5. "It Must Have Been the Roses" (Hunter) – 5:45 →
6. "Dire Wolf" (Garcia, Hunter) – 3:59
7. "Queen Jane Approximately" (Bob Dylan) – 7:16
8. "Tennessee Jed" (Garcia, Hunter) – 7:50 →
9. "The Music Never Stopped" (Weir, John Perry Barlow) – 8:18

Disc two

Second set:

1. "Victim or the Crime" (Weir, Gerrit Graham) – 8:24 →
2. "Crazy Fingers" (Garcia, Hunter) – 9:38 →
3. "Playing in the Band" (Weir, Mickey Hart, Hunter) – 9:22 →
4. "Terrapin Station" (Garcia, Hunter) – 12:47 →
5. "Boston Clam Jam" (Grateful Dead) – 5:37 →
6. "Drums" (Hart, Kreutzmann) – 11:04 →
7. "Space" (Grateful Dead) – 8:15 →

Disc three

Second set, continued:

1. "That Would Be Something" (Paul McCartney) – 3:51 →
2. "Playing in the Band" (Weir, Hunter) – 5:23 →
3. "China Doll" (Garcia, Hunter) – 5:46 →
4. "Throwing Stones" (Weir, Barlow) – 8:59 →
5. "Not Fade Away" (Charles Hardin, Norman Petty) – 9:01

Encore:

6. "The Mighty Quinn (Quinn the Eskimo)" (Bob Dylan) – 4:43

March 31, 1991:

7. "Samson and Delilah" (Traditional, arr. Weir) – 7:47 →
8. "Eyes of the World" (Garcia, Hunter) – 23:30

== Personnel ==
Grateful Dead:

- Jerry Garcia – lead guitar, vocals
- Mickey Hart – drums
- Bruce Hornsby – keyboards, accordion, vocals
- Bill Kreutzmann – drums
- Phil Lesh – bass, vocals
- Bob Weir – rhythm guitar, vocals
- Vince Welnick – keyboards, vocals

Production:

- Dick Latvala, David Lemieux – tape archivists
- Gecko Graphics – design
- Dan Healy – recording
- Jeffrey Norman – CD mastering
- John Cutler – magnetic scrutinizer
- Jim Anderson, Susana Millman – photography

== See also ==
- Dick's Picks series
- Grateful Dead discography
