= Dave's Picks Volume 41 =

Live album by Grateful Dead
- Released: January 28, 2022
- Recorded: May 26, 1977
- Venue: Baltimore Civic Center
- Genre: Rock
- Length: 183:00
- Label: Rhino
- Producer: Grateful Dead

Grateful Dead chronology
Dave's Picks Volume 40 (2021)	Dave's Picks Volume 41 (2022)	Dave's Picks Volume 42 (2022)

Dave's Picks Volume 41 is a three-CD live album by the rock band the Grateful Dead. It contains the complete concert recorded on May 26, 1977, at the Baltimore Civic Center in Baltimore, Maryland. It was released on January 28, 2022, in a limited edition of 25,000 copies.

The album includes one bonus track – "U.S. Blues", the encore from the July 19, 1990 show at Deer Creek Music Center. This song had been omitted from Dave's Picks Volume 40 due to lack of space.

== Critical reception ==
On AllMusic Timothy Monger wrote, "May 26, 1977 saw the Dead occupying the Baltimore Civic Center for a spirited night of that era's staples and early workouts from the newly recorded but not-yet-released Terrapin Station album."

== Track listing ==
Disc 1

First set:

1. "The Music Never Stopped" (Bob Weir, John Barlow) – 8:07
2. "Sugaree" (Jerry Garcia, Robert Hunter) – 15:37
3. "Mama Tried" (Merle Haggard) – 4:12
4. "Sunrise" (Donna Godchaux) – 4:14
5. "Deal" (Garcia, Hunter) – 5:48
6. "Passenger" (Phil Lesh, Peter Monk) – 3:45
7. "Brown-Eyed Women" (Garcia, Hunter) – 6:02
8. "Looks Like Rain" (Weir, Barlow) – 8:51
9. "Jack-a-Roe" (traditional, arranged by Grateful Dead) – 6:23
10. "New Minglewood Blues" (traditional, arranged by Grateful Dead) – 6:04
11. "Bertha" (Garcia, Hunter) – 7:21

Disc 2

Second set:

1. "Samson and Delilah" (traditional, arranged by Grateful Dead) – 8:00
2. "High Time" (Garcia, Hunter) – 8:11
3. "Big River" (Johnny Cash) – 7:00

Bonus track – July 19, 1990 Deer Creek encore:

4. "U.S. Blues" (Garcia, Hunter) – 9:22

Disc 3

Second set, continued:

1. "Terrapin Station" > (Garcia, Hunter) – 10:57
2. "Estimated Prophet" > (Weir, Barlow) – 9:42
3. "Eyes of the World" > (Garcia, Hunter) – 12:31
4. "Not Fade Away" > (Norman Petty, Charles Hardin) – 16:45
5. "Goin' Down the Road Feeling Bad" > (traditional, arranged by Grateful Dead) – 8:25
6. "Around and Around" (Chuck Berry) – 8:11

Encore:

7. "Uncle John's Band" (Garcia, Hunter) – 7:56

== Personnel ==
Grateful Dead

- Jerry Garcia – guitar, vocals
- Bob Weir – guitar, vocals
- Phil Lesh – bass
- Keith Godchaux – keyboards
- Donna Jean Godchaux – vocals
- Mickey Hart – drums
- Bill Kreutzmann – drums

Note: On "U.S. Blues" Keith and Donna are replaced by Brent Mydland on keyboards and vocals.

Production

- Produced by Grateful Dead
- Produced for release by David Lemieux
- Executive producer: Mark Pinkus
- Associate producers: Doran Tyson, Ivette Ramos
- CD mastering: Jeffrey Norman
- Recording: Betty Cantor-Jackson
- Tape research: Michael Wesley Johnson
- Art direction, design: Steve Vance
- Cover art: Matt J. Adams
- Photos: Peter Simon
- Liner notes essay: David Lemieux

== Charts ==
Chart performance for Dave's Picks Volume 41
Chart (2022)	Peak position
US Billboard 200	13
US Top Rock Albums (Billboard)	1

== See also ==
- Dave's Picks Volume 1 – recorded the night before, on May 25, 1977
- To Terrapin: Hartford '77 – recorded two nights after, on May 28, 1977
