= Dick's Picks Volume 19 =

Live album by Grateful Dead
- Released: October 23, 2000
- Recorded: October 19, 1973
- Genre: Rock, jam
- Length: 188:34
- Label: Grateful Dead

Grateful Dead chronology
View from the Vault (2000)	Dick's Picks Volume 19 (2000)	Ladies and Gentlemen... the Grateful Dead (2000)

Professional ratings
Review scores
Source	Rating
Allmusic	4/5 stars
The Music Box	4.5/5 stars
Rolling Stone	4/5 stars

Dick's Picks Volume 19 is the 19th live album in the Dick's Picks series of releases by the Grateful Dead. The album is on three CDs, and contains the complete concert recorded on October 19, 1973 at the Fairgrounds Arena in Oklahoma City, Oklahoma.

== Enclosure ==
The release includes two sheets of paper stapled together in the middle, yielding an eight-page enclosure. The front duplicates the cover of the CD and the back shows the outline of a white circular stealie superimposed on a color photograph of the prairie with a fence stretching out into the distance and a tornado forming in the sky above it.

The first two pages inside the enclosure feature a collage of memorabilia from the tour and the band's recent studio album Wake of the Flood. The middle two pages feature a photomontage of eight photos, three in color and five in black-and-white, of the band members performing on stage. The penultimate page contains a single black-and-white photo of the band on stage backed by a color photo showing lightning bolts, and the last page lists the contents of and credits for the release.

== Caveat emptor ==
Each volume of Dick's Picks has its own "caveat emptor" label, advising the listener of the sound quality of the recording. The one for Volume 19 reads:

"Despite a rather skeevy ouverture, the sound quality of this release quickly settles into a nice, warm groove. Listen closely, however, for you may just find that your mind will be blown by the music contained herein."

== Track listing ==
=== Disc one ===
First set:

1. "Promised Land" (Chuck Berry) – 3:44
2. "Sugaree" (Jerry Garcia, Robert Hunter) – 8:18
3. "Mexicali Blues" (Bob Weir, John Barlow) – 3:58
4. "Tennessee Jed" (Garcia, Hunter) – 8:00
5. "Looks like Rain" (Weir, Barlow) – 8:05
6. "Don't Ease Me In" (traditional, arranged by Grateful Dead) – 4:24
7. "Jack Straw" (Weir, Hunter) – 5:32
8. "They Love Each Other" (Garcia, Hunter) – 5:44
9. "El Paso" (Marty Robbins) – 4:51
10. "Row Jimmy" (Garcia, Hunter) – 9:23

=== Disc two ===
1. "Playing in the Band" (Weir, Mickey Hart, Hunter) – 18:23

Second set:

2. "China Cat Sunflower" (Garcia, Hunter) – 9:11 →
3. "I Know You Rider" (traditional, arranged by Grateful Dead) – 6:18
4. "Me and My Uncle" (John Phillips) – 3:34
5. "Mississippi Half-Step Uptown Toodeloo" (Garcia, Hunter) – 7:30
6. "Big River" (Johnny Cash) – 4:52

=== Disc three ===
1. "Dark Star" (Garcia, Bill Kreutzmann, Phil Lesh, Ron "Pigpen" McKernan, Weir, Hunter) – 15:45 →
2. "Mind Left Body Jam" (Grateful Dead) – 10:41 →
3. "Morning Dew" (Bonnie Dobson, Tim Rose) – 13:55
4. "Sugar Magnolia" (Weir, Hunter) – 10:10

First encore:

5. "Eyes of the World" (Garcia, Hunter) – 14:31 →
6. "Stella Blue" (Garcia, Hunter) – 7:57

Second encore:

7. "Johnny B. Goode" (Berry) – 4:08

== Personnel ==
- Jerry Garcia – lead guitar, vocals
- Bob Weir – rhythm guitar, vocals
- Phil Lesh – bass guitar, vocals
- Keith Godchaux – piano
- Donna Godchaux – vocals
- Bill Kreutzmann – drums

=== Production ===
- Bill Candelario – recording
- Dick Latvala – tape archivist
- David Lemieux – tape archivist
- Jeffrey Norman – mastering
- Eileen Law – archival research
- Jack Seaman – photography
- Byron Nygreen – photography
- Tina Carpenter – cover art, design
- David DeNoma – cover photography
