= Dick's Picks Volume 10 =

Live album by the Grateful Dead
- Released: February 26, 1998
- Recorded: December 29, 1977
- Genres: Folk rock, jam band, rock and roll
- Length: 197:59
- Label: Grateful Dead

The Grateful Dead chronology
Live at the Fillmore East 2-11-69 (1997)	Dick's Picks Volume 10 (1998)	Dick's Picks Volume 11 (1998)

Professional ratings
Review scores
Source	Rating
Allmusic	3/5 stars
The Music Box	5/5 stars
Rolling Stone	3/5 stars

Dick's Picks Volume 10 is the tenth live album in the Dick's Picks series of releases by the Grateful Dead. It was recorded at Winterland Arena in San Francisco on December 29, 1977, with extra tracks recorded on the following night.

The album omits the songs "It Must Have Been the Roses" and "Sunrise", which followed "Good Lovin' ". It also includes the first performance of "China Cat Sunflower" in over three years, which is audibly greeted with applause from the audience. The final four tracks on disc three constitute the songs taken from the December 30 concert.

== Enclosure and liner notes ==
This release includes a single sheet of paper folded into thirds, yielding a six-page enclosure. The front matches the cover on the CD, and inside this are two pages listing the contents of and credits for the release. Also inside is a two-page article and a picture of Bill Graham at midnight from the December 31 concert dressed as a skeleton in black leather riding a chopper against a background of clouds.

=== Liner notes ===
Michael Nash wrote the liner notes on 12/29/97 – the twentieth anniversary of the show featured on the release. The title of it is "Remembrance of things past (and yet, still present)" and the subtitle is " 'We're gonna try to get everything just exactly perfect ... on account of our new name is the Just Exactly Perfect Brothers Band.' " [Ellipsis in original.]

The beginning of the article provides context for the show, describing Winterland in mythical terms: "the funky former ice palace was, in fact, Valhalla, where Odin sat in the top row, proudly watching his titans shake the firmament and tear the roof off the joint." Nash goes on to say that in late 1977 "the music grew muscles and developed a Popeye-like swagger", this was "the second gig of [a] four-night stand", and "All night long, Garcia seemed more than willing to risk hitting the occasional bad note in order to find the ones no one else could imagine."

About two-thirds of the way through, the author switches to italics for three full paragraphs to describe the highlight of the show, the series of songs that starts and ends with Playing in the Band. In this set of songs, he makes it clear that China Cat Sunflower was most welcome, because it had been "unheard on stage for over three years." Nash closes the article by asserting "the applause echoes still" and that being there "didn't make us cool. Just thrilled."

== Caveat emptor ==
Each volume of Dick's Picks has its own "caveat emptor" label, advising the listener of the sound quality of the recording. The label for Volume 10 reads:

"This release was digitally mastered directly from the original half track 7 1/2 ips analog tapes. It is a snapshot of history, not a modern professional recording, and although it may exhibit some minor technical anomalies, it is nothing more or less than just exactly perfect."

== Track listing ==
=== Disc one ===
First set:

1. "Jack Straw" (Robert Hunter, Bob Weir) – 7:05
2. "They Love Each Other" (Hunter, Jerry Garcia) – 7:44
3. "Mama Tried" (Merle Haggard) – 3:48
4. "Loser" (Hunter, Garcia) – 8:29
5. "Looks Like Rain" (John Perry Barlow, Weir) – 8:38
6. "Tennessee Jed" (Hunter, Garcia) – 9:09
7. "New Minglewood Blues" (Traditional arr. Weir) – 6:05
8. "Sugaree" (Hunter, Garcia) – 14:18
9. "Promised Land" (Chuck Berry) – 4:35

=== Disc two ===
Second set:

1. "Bertha" (Hunter, Garcia) – 7:20 →
2. "Good Lovin' " (Rudy Clark, Artie Resnick) – 6:50
3. "Playing in the Band" (Hunter, Mickey Hart, Weir) – 15:48 →
4. "China Cat Sunflower" (Hunter, Garcia) – 5:39 →
5. "I Know You Rider" (Traditional arr. Grateful Dead) – 5:27 →
6. "China Doll" (Hunter, Garcia) – 7:24 →
7. "Playing Jam" (Hart, Weir) – 1:40 →
8. "Drums" (Hart, Bill Kreutzmann) – 2:39 →
9. "Not Fade Away" (Buddy Holly, Norman Petty) – 10:05 →
10. "Playing in the Band" (Hunter, Hart, Weir) – 4:48

=== Disc three ===
Encore:

1. "Terrapin Station" (Hunter, Garcia) – 10:29
2. "Johnny B. Goode" (Berry) – 4:36

Bonus tracks – December 30, 1977:

3. "Estimated Prophet" (Barlow, Weir) – 10:46 →
4. "Eyes of the World" (Hunter, Garcia) – 15:25 →
5. "St. Stephen" (Hunter, Garcia, Phil Lesh) – 9:18 →
6. "Sugar Magnolia" (Hunter, Weir) – 9:53

== Personnel ==
=== Grateful Dead ===
- Jerry Garcia – lead guitar, vocals
- Donna Godchaux – vocals
- Keith Godchaux – keyboards
- Mickey Hart – drums, percussion
- Bill Kreutzmann – drums, percussion
- Phil Lesh – bass guitar
- Bob Weir – rhythm guitar, vocals

=== Production ===
- Betty Cantor-Jackson – recording
- Dick Latvala – tape archivist
- Jeffrey Norman – ferromagnetist
- Gecko Graphics – cover design
- Ed Perlstein – photography
- Michael Nash – liner notes

== See also ==
- Dick's Picks series
- Grateful Dead discography
