= Dick's Picks Volume 2 =

Live album by Grateful Dead
- Released: March 1995
- Recorded: October 31, 1971
- Genre: Rock
- Length: 58:19
- Label: Grateful Dead

Grateful Dead chronology
Grayfolded (1994)	Dick's Picks Volume 2 (1995)	Hundred Year Hall (1995)

Professional ratings
Review scores
Source	Rating
Allmusic	3/5 stars
The Music Box	4/5 stars
Rolling Stone	2/5 stars
Entertainment Weekly	A−

Dick's Picks Volume 2 is the second live album in the Dick's Picks series of releases by the Grateful Dead. It was recorded on Halloween night in 1971 at the Ohio Theatre in Columbus, Ohio. The album consists of the second set of the concert. It was released in March 1995, the last Grateful Dead album to be released before the death of Jerry Garcia.

Dick's Picks Volume 2 is the only one of the Dick's Picks that is a single CD. The other albums in the series have either two, three, or four CDs, except for Dick's Picks Volume 29, which contains six CDs.

== Set list ==
The complete concert set list for the 10/31/71 show at the Ohio Theatre was:

1: "Bertha", "Me and My Uncle", "Deal", "Playing in the Band", "Loser", "El Paso", "Tennessee Jed", "Jack Straw", "Big Railroad Blues", "Brown Eyed Women", "Mexicali Blues", "Casey Jones", "Cumberland Blues", "One More Saturday Night"

2: "Dark Star"* → "Jam"* → "Sugar Magnolia"* → "St. Stephen"* → "Not Fade Away"* → "Goin' Down the Road Feelin' Bad"* → "Not Fade Away" reprise*

E: "Johnny B. Goode"

Note: New Riders of the Purple Sage were the opening act.

* appears on Dick's Picks Volume 2

== The jam ==
The jam that appears on the set list after "Dark Star" is generally referred to as "Tighten Up Jam" by collectors due to its similarities to the Archie Bell & the Drells tune "Tighten Up". The Grateful Dead would jam on the theme only a handful of times, mostly from 1969 until 1971.

Also notably rare is a "Cold Rain and Snow" tease on the way back into playing "Not Fade Away" from "Goin' Down the Road Feeling Bad". The Grateful Dead were known for teasing bits of songs, often they would play a song they teased at a different show.

== Caveat emptor ==
Each volume of Dick's Picks has its own "caveat emptor" label, advising the listener of the sound quality of the recording. The label for Volume 2 reads:

"This compact disc has been digitally remastered directly from the original quarter track 7½ ips analog tape. It is a snapshot of history, not a modern professional recording, and may therefore exhibit some technical anomalies and the unavoidable effects of the ravages of time."

== Track listing ==
1. "Dark Star" (Jerry Garcia, Mickey Hart, Bill Kreutzmann, Phil Lesh, Ron "Pigpen" McKernan, Bob Weir, Robert Hunter) – 23:14 →
  "Jam" →
2. "Sugar Magnolia" (Weir, Hunter) – 6:33 →
3. "St. Stephen" (Garcia, Lesh, Hunter) – 7:10
4. "Not Fade Away" (Norman Petty, Charles Hardin) – 7:25 →
5. "Goin' Down the Road Feeling Bad" (traditional, arranged by Grateful Dead) – 10:38 →
6. "Not Fade Away" (Petty, Hardin) – 3:19

== Personnel ==
Grateful Dead

- Jerry Garcia – lead guitar, vocals
- Keith Godchaux – keyboards
- Bill Kreutzmann – percussion
- Phil Lesh – bass, vocals
- Bob Weir – guitar, vocals

Production

- Rex Jackson – recording
- Dick Latvala – tape archivist
- Gecko Graphics – design

== See also ==
- Dick's Picks series
- Grateful Dead discography
