= Grateful Dead Download Series Volume 7 =

Live album by Grateful Dead
- Released: November 1, 2005
- Recorded: September 3 & 4, 1980
- Length: 238:20
- Label: Grateful Dead Productions

Grateful Dead chronology
Dick's Picks Volume 36 (2005)	Grateful Dead; Download Series Volume 7 (2005)	Fillmore West 1969: The Complete Recordings (2005)

Download Series Volume 7 is a live album by the rock band Grateful Dead. It was released as a digital download on November 1, 2005, and is a three-disc compilation of the band's performance on September 3, 1980 at the Springfield Civic Center in Springfield, Massachusetts and September 4, 1980 at the Providence Civic Center in Providence, Rhode Island. The first two discs feature the September 3 show, while the third disc presents the second set from the September 4 performance.

Volume 7 was mastered in HDCD by Jeffrey Norman.

== Track listing ==
=== Disc one ===
9/3/80 Springfield Civic Center, Springfield, MA

First set:

1. "Mississippi Half-Step Uptown Toodeloo" > (Garcia, Hunter) - 8:26
2. "Franklin's Tower" (Garcia, Kreutzmann, Hunter) - 9:12
3. "Mama Tried" > (Haggard) - 2:26
4. "Mexicali Blues" (Weir, Barlow) - 5:01
5. "Althea" > (Garcia, Hunter) - 7:59
6. "Little Red Rooster" (Dixon) - 7:45
7. "Candyman" (Garcia, Hunter) - 7:33
8. "Easy To Love You" (Mydland, Barlow) - 4:30
9. "Let It Grow" > (Weir, Barlow) - 10:56
10. "Deal" (Garcia, Hunter) - 4:28

Second set:

11. "Feel Like A Stranger" (Weir, Barlow) - 11:15

=== Disc two ===
1. "High Time" (Garcia, Hunter) - 8:12
2. "Lost Sailor" > (Weir, Barlow) - 7:10
3. "Saint Of Circumstance" > (Weir, Barlow) - 6:12
4. "Jam" > (Grateful Dead) - 2:48
5. "Drums with Brent" > (Hart, Kreutzmann, Mydland) - 2:47
6. "Rhythm Devils" > (Hart, Kreutzmann) - 8:51
7. "Space" > (Garcia, Lesh, Weir) - 2:15
8. "He's Gone" > (Garcia, Hunter) - 9:57
9. "Truckin' " > (Garcia, Lesh, Weir, Hunter) - 8:11
10. "Black Peter" > (Garcia, Hunter) - 9:08
11. "Around and Around" > (Berry) - 3:58
12. "Johnny B. Goode" (Berry) - 4:40

Encore:

13. "Brokedown Palace" (Garcia, Hunter) - 5:22

=== Disc three ===
9/4/80 Providence Civic Center, Providence, RI

Second set: (missing "Samson and Delilah" and "Ramble On Rose")

1. "Supplication Jam" > (Weir, Barlow) - 4:36
2. "Estimated Prophet" > (Weir, Barlow) - 10:29
3. "Eyes Of The World" > (Garcia, Hunter) - 8:09
4. "Rhythm Devils" > (Hart, Kreutzmann) - 11:11
5. "Space" > (Garcia, Lesh, Weir) - 6:46
6. "The Other One" > (Weir, Kreutzmann) - 8:00
7. "Wharf Rat" > (Garcia, Hunter) - 9:49
8. "Goin' Down The Road Feeling Bad" > (Trad. Arr. By Grateful Dead) - 6:49
9. "Good Lovin' " (Resnick, Clark) - 8:04

Encore:

10. "U.S. Blues" (Garcia, Hunter) - 5:25

== Personnel ==
Grateful Dead

- Jerry Garcia – lead guitar, vocals
- Brent Mydland – keyboards, vocals
- Mickey Hart – drums
- Bill Kreutzmann – drums
- Phil Lesh – electric bass
- Bob Weir – rhythm guitar, vocals

Production

- Dan Healy – recording
- Jeffrey Norman – mastering
