= Dave's Picks Volume 59 =

Live album by Grateful Dead
- Released: July 31, 2026
- Recorded: September 26, 1991
- Venue: Boston Garden
- Length: 154:37
- Label: Rhino
- Producer: Grateful Dead

Grateful Dead chronology
Fillmore Auditorium, San Francisco, CA, July 3, 1966 (2026)	Dave's Picks Volume 59 (2026)	Summer Magic 1985 (2026)

Dave's Picks Volume 59 is a live album by the American rock band Grateful Dead. It contains the complete concert recorded at the Boston Garden in Boston, Massachusetts on September 26, 1991. It was released on July 31, 2026 by Rhino Entertainment, in a limited edition of 25,000 copies.

== Background and release ==
Dave's Picks Volume 59 includes the band's final performance of "And We Bid You Good Night", at the end of the concert. It was the third album in the 2026 series of Dave's Picks archival releases, overseen by David Lemieux. The album was mastered to HDCD by Jeffrey Norman of Mockingbird Masters, and was originally recorded by Dan Healy.

The concert from the previous night at Boston Garden was released in 2000 as Dick's Picks Volume 17.

== Critical reception ==
In Glide Magazine, Doug Collette wrote, "In the wake of keyboardist Brent Mydland's passing the previous year, after a decade-long tenure with the group, the longest of any GD keyboardist, Bruce Hornsby's ultimately transitory participation on piano and accordion came close on the heels of Vince Welnick's enlistment... The duo vigorously bolstered what the Dead were doing, and it was far more than just soldiering on this autumn night three and a half decades ago."

== Track listing ==
Disc 1

First set:

1. Tuning intro – 7:26
2. "Jack Straw" (Bob Weir, Robert Hunter) – 5:49
3. "Cold Rain and Snow" (traditional, arranged by Grateful Dead) – 8:40
4. "Wang Dang Doodle" (Willie Dixon) – 8:21
5. "Candyman" (Jerry Garcia, Hunter) – 7:17
6. "Mexicali Blues" > (Weir, John Perry Barlow) – 5:41
7. "Cumberland Blues" (Garcia, Phil Lesh, Hunter) – 7:23
8. "Picasso Moon" (Weir, Bob Bralove, Barlow) – 6:45
9. "Box of Rain" (Lesh, Hunter) – 5:06

Disc 2

Second set:

1. "Dark Star" > (Garcia, Mickey Hart, Bill Kreutzmann, Lesh, Ron McKernan, Weir, Hunter) – 16:29
2. "Saint of Circumstance" > (Weir, Barlow) – 6:43
3. "Eyes of the World" > (Garcia, Hunter) – 12:44
4. "Drums" (Hart, Kreutzmann) – 12:30

Disc 3

Second set, continued:

1. "Space" > (Garcia, Lesh, Weir) – 8:19
2. "The Other One" > (Weir, Kreutzmann) – 7:32
3. "Dark Star" > (Garcia, Hart, Kreutzmann, Lesh, McKernan, Weir, Hunter) – 6:19
4. "Attics of My Life" > (Garcia, Hunter) – 5:48
5. "Good Lovin'" (Rudy Clark, Arthur Resnick) – 7:13

Encore:

6. "Brokedown Palace" > (Garcia, Hunter) – 5:21
7. "And We Bid You Goodnight" (traditional, arranged by Grateful Dead) – 3:04

== Personnel ==
Grateful Dead

- Jerry Garcia – guitar, vocals
- Bob Weir – guitar, vocals
- Vince Welnick – keyboards, vocals
- Bruce Hornsby – keyboards, vocals
- Phil Lesh – bass, vocals
- Bill Kreutzmann – drums
- Mickey Hart – drums

Production

- Produced by Grateful Dead
- Produced for release by David Lemieux
- Executive producer: Mark Pinkus
- Associate producer: Ivette Ramos
- Mastering: Jeffrey Norman
- Recording: Dan Healy
- Art direction, design: Steve Vance
- Cover art: Chelsea Housand
- Photos: Scott Sislane
