= Dick's Picks Volume 11 =

Live album by Grateful Dead
- Released: June 9, 1998
- Recorded: September 27, 1972
- Venue: Stanley Theater
- Genres: Rock, jam
- Length: 183:22
- Label: Grateful Dead

Grateful Dead chronology
Dick's Picks Volume 10 (1998)	Dick's Picks Volume 11 (1998)	Dick's Picks Volume 12 (1998)

Professional ratings
Review scores
Source	Rating
Allmusic	4/5 stars
The Music Box	5/5 stars
Rolling Stone	3/5 stars

Dick's Picks Volume 11 is a three-CD live album by the rock band the Grateful Dead. It contains the complete show recorded at the Stanley Theater in Jersey City, New Jersey on September 27, 1972. It was released on June 9, 1998.

This release is known to have a patched cut in the original soundboard tapes. If certain soundboards are missing parts of a song, the official release may contain a patched cut. Patches sometimes originate from an audience source or from an entirely different show. There is no database for soundboards patched with an audience source and, hence, is up to the listeners to discover patched cuts while listening. For instance, "I Know You Rider", on disc 2, contains a patch from 1972-09-24 which occurs at 1:55 to 2:20 on the track. It is possible that there are other patched cuts on this release.

== Enclosure and concert notes ==
Included in the release is a single sheet of paper, printed on both sides and folded into thirds, yielding a six-page enclosure. The front cover is a replica of the disc's cover and the back cover shows a small, oval-shaped image of what looks like a Sconce (light fixture) or other small sculpture, engraved with Stanley in uppercase and presumably from the venue, against a background of clouds that flows seamlessly into the clouds on the cover. The inside contains three pages of notes about the show and a page listing the contents of and credits for the release.

=== Concert notes ===
Appearing above a blurry image of some of the crowd is a series of "Concert notes by Paul Grushkin 9/27/72, Stanley Theater, Jersey City, NJ". These notes are written in a stream-of-consciousness style consisting of mostly incomplete sentences in lowercase with minimal punctuation.

After a short introduction that mentions, for example, that the venue is a "plushy vaudeville palace, like the Harding in SF only bigger", the notes list each song the band played that night along with the author's impressions. Excerpts from some of these impressions follow.

Morning Dew: "to open the first set????"
Friend of the Devil: "starting to get body rushes", followed by a list of what each band member is wearing.
Playin' in the Band: "it's Bobby! ... into convoluted Miles Davis kind of thrash and squall Donna s c r e a m s at end break at 10:18 we stumble around and take stock".
He's Gone: "by god they're having a great time family-style interplay betw. bandmembers". This entry is the second-longest of all of them.
Dark Star: "reverent applause, everything else tonite maybe just a lead-up". This entry is the longest of all of them. It ends with "a full-blown psycho circus" in uppercase followed immediately by:
"into Cumberland Blues shrill, insistent lead drilling a hole in my head".
Uncle John's Band: "sweet happiness everywhere, all around epiphany in Jersey City".

Grushkin ends his piece with: "12:40 am. stumbling out into Jersey half-light completely dead to the world did they really open with Morning Dew?"

== Track listing ==
=== Disc one ===
First set:

1. "Morning Dew" (Bonnie Dobson, Tim Rose) – 12:38
2. "Beat It on Down the Line" (Jesse Fuller) – 3:34
3. "Friend of the Devil" (Jerry Garcia, John Dawson, Robert Hunter) – 4:06
4. "Black-Throated Wind" (John Barlow, Bob Weir) – 6:52
5. "Tennessee Jed" (Garcia, Hunter) – 8:08
6. "Mexicali Blues" (Barlow, Weir) – 3:39
7. "Bird Song" (Garcia, Hunter) – 11:46
8. "Big River" (Johnny Cash) – 4:51
9. "Brokedown Palace" (Garcia, Hunter) – 5:59
10. "El Paso" (Marty Robbins) – 4:42

=== Disc two ===
First set, continued:

1. "China Cat Sunflower" (Garcia, Hunter) – 7:25 →
2. "I Know You Rider" (traditional) – 5:26
3. "Playing in the Band" (Mickey Hart, Hunter, Weir) – 16:14

Second set:

4. "He's Gone" (Garcia, Hunter) – 13:30
5. "Me & My Uncle" (John Phillips) – 3:38
6. "Deal" (Garcia, Hunter) – 4:51
7. "Greatest Story Ever Told" (Hart, Hunter, Weir) – 5:29
8. "Ramble on Rose" (Garcia, Hunter) – 6:28

=== Disc three ===
Second set, continued:

1. "Dark Star" (Grateful Dead, Hunter) – 30:49 →
2. "Cumberland Blues" (Garcia, Hunter, Lesh) – 6:55
3. "Attics of My Life" (Garcia, Hunter) – 5:11
4. "Promised Land" (Chuck Berry) – 3:04
5. "Uncle John's Band" (Garcia, Hunter) – 8:43
6. "Casey Jones" (Garcia, Hunter) – 7:29

Encore:

7. "Around and Around" (Berry) – 5:18

== Personnel ==
Grateful Dead:

- Jerry Garcia – lead guitar, vocals
- Bill Kreutzmann – percussion
- Phil Lesh – bass, vocals
- Bob Weir – guitar, vocals
- Donna Jean Godchaux – vocals
- Keith Godchaux – keyboards

Production:

- Dick Latvala – tape archivist
- Gecko Graphics – design
- Owsley Stanley, Bob Matthews – recording
- Jeffrey Norman – CD mastering
- John Cutler – magnetic scrutinizer
- Jonas Grushkin – photography
- Paul Grushkin – CD liner notes
