= Dave's Picks Volume 35 =

Live album by Grateful Dead
- Released: July 31, 2020
- Recorded: April 20, 1984
- Venue: Philadelphia Civic Center; Philadelphia, Pennsylvania
- Genre: Rock
- Length: 230:30
- Label: Rhino
- Producer: Grateful Dead

Grateful Dead chronology
Workingman's Dead: The Angel's Share (2020)	Dave's Picks Volume 35 (2020)	American Beauty: The Angel's Share (2020)

Dave's Picks Volume 35 is a 3-CD live album by the rock band the Grateful Dead. It contains the complete concert recorded at the Philadelphia Civic Center in Philadelphia, Pennsylvania on April 20, 1984. It also includes bonus tracks comprising most of the second set of the concert recorded at the same venue on the previous night. It was released on July 31, 2020, in a limited edition of 22,000 copies.

Volume 35 was the first Grateful Dead archival album from 1984 (with the exception of the concert included in the 30 Trips Around the Sun box set).

== Critical reception ==
On AllMusic, Timothy Monger wrote, "Grateful Dead archivist Dave Lemieux unearths yet another gem for Dave's Picks, Vol. 35... While it's a smidge brief for a typical Dead show, adventurous versions of "Feel Like a Stranger", "Let It Grow", and "Scarlet Begonias" all exceed the ten-minute mark, making it feel quite epic."

== Track listing ==
Disc 1

First set:

1. "Feel Like a Stranger" (Bob Weir, John Perry Barlow) – 10:02
2. "Cold Rain and Snow" (traditional, arranged by Grateful Dead) – 7:56
3. "Beat It On Down the Line" (Jesse Fuller) – 3:55
4. "Cumberland Blues" (Jerry Garcia, Phil Lesh, Robert Hunter) – 6:26
5. "Little Red Rooster" (Willie Dixon) – 10:04
6. "Brown-Eyed Women" (Garcia, Hunter) – 5:29
7. "My Brother Esau" (Weir, Barlow) – 7:00
8. "It Must Have Been the Roses" > (Hunter) – 5:52
9. "Let It Grow" (Weir, Barlow) – 15:24

Disc 2

Second set:

1. "Scarlet Begonias" > (Garcia, Hunter) – 13:50
2. "Fire on the Mountain" > (Mickey Hart, Hunter) – 14:56
3. "Samson and Delilah" > (traditional, arranged by Grateful Dead) – 8:12
4. "Drums" > (Hart, Bill Kreutzmann) – 11:03
5. "Space", part 1 (Garcia, Lesh, Weir) – 3:32

Bonus tracks – April 19, 1984:

6. "The Wheel" > (Garcia, Hunter, Kreutzmann) – 7:17
7. "Wharf Rat" > (Garcia, Hunter) – 11:26
8. "Sugar Magnolia" (Weir, Hunter) – 8:56

Disc 3

Second set continued:

1. "Space", part 2 > (Garcia, Lesh, Weir) – 7:15
2. "I Need a Miracle" > (Weir, Barlow) – 6:30
3. "Morning Dew" > (Bonnie Dobson, Tim Rose) – 10:32
4. "Around and Around" > (Chuck Berry) – 3:41
5. "Johnny B. Goode" (Berry) – 4:43

Encore:

6. "Keep Your Day Job" (Garcia, Hunter) – 4:38

Bonus tracks – April 19, 1984:

7. "China Cat Sunflower" > (Garcia, Hunter) – 6:31
8. "I Know You Rider" (traditional, arranged by Grateful Dead) – 7:10
9. "Estimated Prophet" > (Weir, Barlow) – 14:22
10. "Terrapin Station" (Garcia, Hunter) – 13:38

Note: The set list for the April 19, 1984 concert at the Philadelphia Civic Center was:

First set: "Bertha" · "Greatest Story Ever Told" · "Loser" · "C.C. Rider" · "Bird Song" · "Hell in a Bucket" · "Big Railroad Blues" · "The Music Never Stopped" · "Don't Ease Me In"

Second set: "China Cat Sunflower"^{[A]} · "I Know You Rider"^{[A]} · "Estimated Prophet"^{[A]} · "Terrapin Station"^{[A]} · "Drums" · "Space" · "The Wheel"^{[A]} · "Wharf Rat"^{[A]} · "Sugar Magnolia"^{[A]}

Encore: "It's All Over Now, Baby Blue"

[A] Included in Dave's Picks Volume 35

== Personnel ==
Grateful Dead

- Jerry Garcia – guitar, vocals
- Mickey Hart – drums
- Bill Kreutzmann – drums
- Phil Lesh – bass
- Brent Mydland – keyboards, vocals
- Bob Weir – guitar, vocals

Production

- Produced by Grateful Dead
- Produced for release by David Lemieux
- Associate Producers: Ivette Ramos & Doran Tyson
- Mastering: Jeffrey Norman
- Recording: Dan Healy
- Art direction, design: Steve Vance
- Cover art: Dave Kloc
- Photos: James R. Anderson
- Liner notes essay: David Lemieux

== Charts ==
Chart performance for Dave's Picks Volume 35
Chart (2020)	Peak position
US Billboard 200	30
