= Road Trips Volume 2 Number 3 =

Live album by Grateful Dead
- Released: June 18, 2009
- Recorded: June 16 and 18, 1974
- Genre: Rock
- Length: 158:42 bonus disc: 78:30
- Label: Grateful Dead
- Producer: Grateful Dead

Grateful Dead chronology
To Terrapin: Hartford '77 (2009)	Road Trips Volume 2 Number 3 (2009)	Road Trips Volume 2 Number 4 (2009)

Alternative cover
- Road Trips Volume 2 Number 3 Bonus Disc

Professional ratings
Review scores
Source	Rating
All About Jazz	(favorable)
The Best of Website	(A)
The Music Box	4.5/5 stars

Road Trips Volume 2 Number 3 is a two-CD live album by the American rock band the Grateful Dead. The seventh in their "Road Trips" series of albums, it was recorded on June 16, 1974, at the Iowa State Fairgrounds in Des Moines, Iowa, and on June 18, 1974, at Freedom Hall in Louisville, Kentucky. A third, bonus disc included with some copies of the album was recorded at the same two concerts. The album was released on June 18, 2009.

The cover of Road Trips Volume 2 Number 3 depicts the Wall of Sound. This was the very large and powerful concert sound system being used by the Grateful Dead at the time of these shows. It was composed of more than 600 speakers, powered by dozens of amplifiers. Each musical instrument had its own dedicated array of speakers. The Wall of Sound provided a superior sonic environment for Dead concert audiences of that era.

== Track listing ==
=== Disc One ===
State Fairgrounds, Des Moines, IA 6/16/74

1. "China Cat Sunflower" > (Jerry Garcia, Robert Hunter) – 10:36
2. "I Know You Rider" (traditional, arranged by Grateful Dead) – 4:52
3. "The Race Is On" (Don Rollins) – 3:23
4. "Eyes of the World" > (Garcia, Hunter) – 20:09
5. "Big River" (Johnny Cash) – 5:42
6. "U.S. Blues" (Garcia, Hunter) – 5:35
7. "Playing in the Band" (Weir, Mickey Hart, Hunter) – 28:53

=== Disc Two ===
Freedom Hall, Louisville, KY 6/18/74

1. "Loose Lucy" (Garcia, Hunter) – 5:34
2. "Eyes of the World" > (Garcia, Hunter) – 14:27
3. "China Doll" (Garcia, Hunter) – 6:02
4. "Weather Report Suite" > (Bob Weir, Eric Andersen, John Perry Barlow) – 16:19
5. "Jam" > (Grateful Dead) – 9:28
6. "The Other One" > (Weir) – 15:46
7. "It's a Sin Jam" > (Grateful Dead) – 3:18
8. "Stella Blue" (Garcia, Hunter) – 8:27

=== Bonus Disc ===
Freedom Hall, Louisville, KY 6/18/74

1. "Morning Dew" (Bonnie Dobson, Tim Rose) – 13:07
2. "Around and Around" (Chuck Berry) – 5:29

State Fairgrounds, Des Moines, IA 6/16/74

3. "Deal" (Garcia, Hunter) – 6:02
4. "Greatest Story Ever Told" (Weir, Hunter) – 5:31
5. "Truckin' " > (Garcia, Lesh, Weir, Hunter) – 8:09
6. "Nobody's Fault But Mine Jam" > (Grateful Dead) – 12:45
7. "Wharf Rat" > (Garcia, Hunter) – 9:36
8. "Goin' Down the Road Feeling Bad" (traditional, arranged by Grateful Dead) – 8:16

Freedom Hall, Louisville, KY 6/18/74

9. "Sugar Magnolia" (Weir, Hunter) – 9:30

During the "China Cat Sunflower" jam, Jerry Garcia briefly plays the melody to "I've Been Working on the Railroad."

== Personnel ==
=== Grateful Dead ===
- Jerry Garcia – lead guitar, vocals
- Donna Jean Godchaux – vocals
- Keith Godchaux – keyboards
- Bill Kreutzmann – drums
- Phil Lesh – electric bass, vocals
- Bob Weir – rhythm guitar, vocals

=== Production ===
- Produced by Grateful Dead
- Compilation produced by David Lemieux and Blair Jackson
- CD mastering by Jeffrey Norman
- Recording by Kidd Candelario
- Liner notes essay "The Wall of Sound" by Dennis McNally
- Archival research by Eileen Law
- Cover art by Scott McDougall
- Wall of Sound diagram by Mary Ann Mayer
- Photos by Kirk Drange, Ray Ellingsen, Lexie Alexander May, and Richard Pechner
- Package design by Steve Vance

== Concert set lists ==
The complete set lists for the June 16 and 18, 1974 concerts were:

June 16, 1974, Iowa State Fairgrounds, Des Moines, Iowa:

- First Set: "Bertha", "Mexicali Blues", "Row Jimmy", "Beat It On Down the Line", "Scarlet Begonias", "Black-Throated Wind", "Sugaree", "El Paso", "It Must Have Been the Roses", "Jack Straw", "China Cat Sunflower"*, "I Know You Rider"*, "Around and Around"
- Second Set: "U.S. Blues"*, "The Race Is On"*, "Eyes of the World"*, "Big River"*, "Playing in the Band"*
- Third Set: "Tennessee Jed", "Me and My Uncle", "Deal"**, "Greatest Story Ever Told"**, "Ship of Fools", "Truckin' "**, "Nobody's Jam"**, "Wharf Rat"**, "Goin' Down the Road Feelin' Bad"**
- Encore: "Casey Jones"

June 18, 1974, Freedom Hall, Louisville, Kentucky:

- First Set: "Promised Land", "It Must Have Been the Roses", "Black-Throated Wind", "Ramble On Rose", "Beat It On Down the Line", "Loser", "Mexicali Blues", "Eyes of the World"*, "China Doll"*, "Around and Around"**
- Second Set: "Loose Lucy"*, "El Paso", "Row Jimmy", "Weather Report Suite"*, "Jam"*, "The Other One"*, "It's a Sin Jam"*, "Stella Blue"*, "Big River", "Tennessee Jed", "Sugar Magnolia"**
- Encore: "Morning Dew"**

* appears on Road Trips Volume 2 Number 3
** appears on bonus disc
