= Road Trips Volume 2 Number 1 =

Live album by Grateful Dead
- Released: December 10, 2008
- Recorded: September 18–20, 1990
- Genre: Rock
- Length: 154:54 bonus disc: 76:49
- Label: Grateful Dead
- Producer: Grateful Dead

Grateful Dead chronology
| Road Trips Volume 1 Number 4 (2008) | Road Trips Volume 2 Number 1 (2008) | Road Trips Volume 2 Number 2 (2009) |

Alternative cover
- Road Trips Volume 2 Number 1 Bonus Disc

Professional ratings
Review scores
| Source | Rating |
|---|---|
| All About Jazz | 4.5/5 stars |
| Allmusic | 3.5/5 stars |
| The Music Box | 4/5 stars |

Road Trips Volume 2 Number 1 is two-CD live album by the American rock band the Grateful Dead. The fifth in their "Road Trips" series of albums, it was recorded at Madison Square Garden in New York City on September 18, 19, and 20, 1990. It was released on December 10, 2008.

A third, "bonus" disc, recorded on September 18, 1990, was included with early shipments of the album.

Another Grateful Dead album recorded during the same run of concerts at Madison Square Garden is Dick's Picks Volume 9.

== Track listing ==
=== Disc One ===
September 20, 1990

1. "Truckin' " > (Jerry Garcia, Phil Lesh, Bob Weir, Robert Hunter) – 9:07
2. "China Cat Sunflower" > (Garcia, Hunter) – 7:51
3. "I Know You Rider" (traditional, arranged by Grateful Dead) – 7:09

September 19, 1990

4. "Playing in the Band" > (Weir, Mickey Hart, Hunter) – 11:05
5. "Ship of Fools" > (Garcia, Hunter) – 6:43
6. "Playing in the Band" > (Weir, Hart, Hunter) – 2:32
7. "Uncle John's Band" > (Garcia, Hunter) – 10:49
8. "Let it Grow" > (Weir, John Barlow) – 11:30
9. "Jam" (Grateful Dead) – 11:18
- An excerpt of "Jam" was previously released on the CD accompanying Phil Lesh's memoir "Searching for the Sound" as "Trio Jam with Bruce Hornsby"

=== Disc Two ===
September 20, 1990

1. "Jam" > (Grateful Dead) – 10:24
2. "Dark Star" > (Garcia, Hart, Bill Kreutzmann, Lesh, Ron McKernan, Weir, Hunter) – 13:21
3. "Playing in the Band" > (Weir, Hart, Hunter) – 3:53
4. "Dark Star" > (Garcia, Hart, Kreutzmann, Lesh, McKernan, Weir, Hunter) – 14:44
5. "Throwing Stones" > (Weir, Barlow) – 10:03
6. "Touch of Grey" (Garcia, Hunter) – 7:41
7. "Turn On Your Love Light" (Joseph Scott, Deadric Malone) – 7:13

September 18, 1990

8. "Knockin' on Heaven's Door" (Bob Dylan) – 9:29

=== Bonus Disc ===
September 18, 1990

1. "Mississippi Half-Step Uptown Toodeloo" (Garcia, Hunter) – 9:34
2. "Picasso Moon" (Weir, Barlow, Bob Bralove) – 7:34
3. "To Lay Me Down" (Garcia, Hunter) – 9:43
4. "Eyes of The World" > (Garcia, Hunter) – 17:57
5. "Estimated Prophet" > (Weir, Barlow) – 12:59
6. "Foolish Heart" > (Garcia, Hunter) – 8:25
7. "Jam" (Grateful Dead) – 10:36
- An edited version of "Jam" was previously released on So Many Roads (1965–1995) as "Jam Out of Foolish Heart"

== Personnel ==
=== Musicians ===
- Jerry Garcia – lead guitar, vocals
- Mickey Hart – drums
- Bruce Hornsby – piano, accordion, vocals
- Bill Kreutzmann – drums
- Phil Lesh – electric bass, vocals
- Bob Weir – rhythm guitar, vocals
- Vince Welnick – keyboards, vocals

=== Production ===
- Produced by Grateful Dead
- Compilation produced by David Lemieux and Blair Jackson
- Recorded by Dan Healy
- Edited and mastered by Jeffrey Norman at Garage Audio Mastering, Petaluma CA
- Cover art by Scott McDougall
- Photos by Susana Millman and Bob Minkin
- Package design by Steve Vance
- Liner notes written by Dan Levy

== Concert set lists ==
The complete set lists for the September 18, 19 and 20, 1990 concerts at Madison Square Garden were:

September 18, 1990:

- First Set: "Mississippi Half-Step Uptown Toodeloo"**, "New Minglewood Blues", "Loser", "Picasso Moon"**, "Row Jimmy", "Loose Lucy", "Desolation Row", "To Lay Me Down"**, "Promised Land"
- Second Set: "Eyes of the World"**, "Estimated Prophet"**, "Foolish Heart"**, "Jam"**, "Drums", "Space", "The Other One", "The Wheel", "Sugar Magnolia"
- Encore: "Knockin' On Heaven's Door"*

September 19, 1990:

- First Set: "Jack Straw", "Bertha", "Me & My Uncle", "Big River", "It Must've Been the Roses", "Stuck Inside of Mobile With the Memphis Blues Again", "Help on the Way", "Slipknot!", "Franklin's Tower"
- Second Set: "Playing in the Band"*, "Ship of Fools"*, "Playing in the Band"*, "Uncle John's Band"*, "Let It Grow"*, "Jam"*, "Drums", "Space", "Goin' Down the Road Feeling Bad", "Stella Blue", "Around and Around"
- Encore: "The Mighty Quinn (Quinn the Eskimo)"

September 20, 1990:

- First Set: "Feels Like a Stranger", "Althea", "It's All Over Now", "Ramble On Rose", "El Paso", "Brown-Eyed Women", "Greatest Story Ever Told", "U.S. Blues"
- Second Set: "Truckin' "*, "China Cat Sunflower"*, "I Know You Rider"*, "Man Smart, Woman Smarter", "Drums", "Space"*, "Dark Star"*, "Playing in the Band (reprise)"*, "Dark Star"*, "Throwing Stones"*, "Touch of Grey"*
- Encore: "Turn On Your Lovelight"*

* appears on Road Trips Volume 2 Number 1
** appears on bonus disc
