= Dave's Picks Volume 33 =

Live album by Grateful Dead
- Released: January 31, 2020
- Recorded: October 29, 1977
- Venue: Chick Evans Field House; DeKalb, Illinois
- Genre: Rock
- Length: 176:22
- Label: Rhino
- Producer: Grateful Dead

Grateful Dead chronology
| Ready or Not (2019) | Dave's Picks Volume 33 (2020) | June 1976 (2020) |

Dave's Picks Volume 33 is a three-CD live album by the rock band the Grateful Dead. It contains the complete show recorded on October 29, 1977 at Evans Field House at Northern Illinois University in DeKalb, Illinois. It was released on January 31, 2020, in a limited edition of 22,000 copies.

Dave's Picks Volume 33 was the 100th Grateful Dead album to be listed in the Billboard 200 weekly chart of the most popular albums in the United States.

== Critical reception ==
On AllMusic, Timothy Monger said, "On the second night of their fall 1977 tour, the Dead set up camp in Evans Field House for a lively show that grew in legend over the coming years among the tape-trading community.... Polished up from official soundboard tapes, Evans Field House is known by fans as a standout show from one of the band's best eras."

== Track listing ==
Disc 1

First set:

1. "Might as Well" (Jerry Garcia, Robert Hunter) – 6:43
2. "Jack Straw" (Bob Weir, Hunter) – 6:23
3. "Dire Wolf" (Garcia, Hunter) – 4:11
4. "Looks Like Rain" (Weir, John Perry Barlow) – 8:52
5. "Loser" (Garcia, Hunter) – 7:50
6. "El Paso" (Marty Robbins) – 4:48
7. "Ramble On Rose" (Garcia, Hunter) – 8:10
8. "New Minglewood Blues" (traditional, arranged by Grateful Dead) – 5:26
9. "It Must Have Been the Roses" (Hunter) – 7:33
10. "Let It Grow" (Weir, Barlow) – 12:41

Disc 2

Second set:

1. "Bertha" > (Garcia, Hunter) – 8:21
2. "Good Lovin'" (Rudy Clark, Artie Resnick) – 7:02
3. "Friend of the Devil" (Garcia, John Dawson, Hunter) – 9:31

Disc 3

Second set, continued:

1. "Estimated Prophet" > (Weir, Barlow)– 11:22
2. "Eyes of the World" > (Garcia, Hunter) – 13:10
3. "Space" > (Garcia, Phil Lesh, Weir) – 7:14
4. "St. Stephen" > (Garcia, Lesh, Hunter) – 11:12
5. "Not Fade Away" > (Norman Petty, Buddy Holly) – 7:37
6. "Black Peter" > (Garcia, Hunter) – 12:22
7. "Sugar Magnolia" (Weir, Hunter) – 10:06

Encore:

8. "One More Saturday Night" (Weir) – 5:23

== Personnel ==
Grateful Dead

- Jerry Garcia – guitar, vocals
- Donna Jean Godchaux – vocals
- Keith Godchaux – keyboards
- Mickey Hart – drums
- Bill Kreutzmann – drums
- Phil Lesh – bass, vocals
- Bob Weir – guitar, vocals

Production

- Produced by Grateful Dead
- Produced for release by David Lemieux
- Associate Producers: Ivette Ramos & Doran Tyson
- Recording: Betty Cantor-Jackson
- Mastering: Jeffrey Norman
- Art direction, design: Steve Vance
- Cover art: Dave Kloc
- Photos: Patrick Harbron
- Liner notes: David Lemieux

== Charts ==
Sales chart performance for Dave's Picks Volume 33
| Chart (2020) | Peak position |
|---|---|
| US Billboard 200 | 45 |
| US Top Rock Albums (Billboard) | 2 |

== See also ==
- List of 2020 albums
