= Road Trips Volume 2 Number 4 =

Live album by Grateful Dead
- Released: August 25, 2009
- Recorded: May 26 – 27, 1993
- Genre: Rock
- Length: 152:06 bonus disc: 68:58
- Label: Grateful Dead
- Producer: Grateful Dead

Grateful Dead chronology
Road Trips Volume 2 Number 3 (2009)	Road Trips Volume 2 Number 4 (2009)	Winterland June 1977: The Complete Recordings (2009)

Alternative cover
- Road Trips Volume 2 Number 4 Bonus Disc

Professional ratings
Review scores
Source	Rating
Allmusic	(favorable)
All About Jazz	(favorable)
The Music Box	4/5 stars

Road Trips Volume 2 Number 4 is a two-CD live album by the American rock band the Grateful Dead. The eighth in their "Road Trips" series of albums, it was recorded on May 26 and 27, 1993, at the Cal Expo Amphitheatre in Sacramento, California. A third, bonus disc included with some copies of the album was recorded at the same two concerts. The album was released on August 25, 2009. As of 2024 the shows are the latest to be given a dedicated official release outside of 30 Trips Around the Sun in 2015, which featured a show from each year between 1966-1995.

== Track listing ==
=== Disc One ===
May 26, 1993:

1. "Samson and Delilah" (traditional, arranged by Bob Weir) – 8:12
2. "Here Comes Sunshine" (Jerry Garcia, Robert Hunter) – 6:27
3. "Walkin' Blues" (traditional, arranged by Weir) – 6:52
4. "Deal" (Garcia, Hunter) – 9:52
5. "Box of Rain" (Phil Lesh, Hunter) – 5:25
6. "Victim or the Crime" > (Weir, Gerrit Graham) – 8:32
7. "Crazy Fingers" > (Garcia, Hunter) – 9:31
8. "Playing in the Band" > (Mickey Hart, Weir, Hunter) – 18:59
9. "Rhythm Devils" > (Hart, Bill Kreutzmann) – 5:17

=== Disc Two ===
May 26, 1993:

1. "Corrina" > (Hart, Weir, Hunter) – 8:44
2. "Playing in the Band" > (Hart, Weir, Hunter) – 3:36
3. "China Doll" > (Garcia, Hunter) – 6:17
4. "Around and Around" (Chuck Berry) – 7:34
5. "Liberty" (Garcia, Hunter) – 6:30

May 27, 1993:

6. "Shakedown Street" (Garcia, Hunter) – 14:20
7. "The Same Thing" (Willie Dixon) – 8:39
8. "Dire Wolf" (Garcia, Hunter) – 3:23
9. "High Time" (Garcia, Hunter) – 8:20
10. "When I Paint My Masterpiece" (Bob Dylan) – 5:28

=== Bonus Disc ===
May 27, 1993:

1. "Picasso Moon" > (Weir, John Perry Barlow, Bob Bralove) – 7:57
2. "Fire on the Mountain" (Hart, Hunter) – 12:18
3. "Cassidy" > (Weir, Barlow) – 6:54
4. "Uncle John's Band" > (Garcia, Hunter) – 9:30
5. "Cassidy" (Weir, Barlow) – 4:10
6. "Gloria" (Van Morrison) – 5:44

May 26, 1993:

7. "Broken Arrow" (Robbie Robertson) – 5:52
8. "Ramble On Rose" (Garcia, Hunter) – 7:53
9. "Stuck Inside of Mobile with the Memphis Blues Again" (Dylan) – 8:32

== Personnel ==
=== Grateful Dead ===
- Jerry Garcia – lead guitar, vocals
- Mickey Hart – drums
- Bill Kreutzmann – drums
- Phil Lesh – electric bass, vocals
- Bob Weir – rhythm guitar, vocals
- Vince Welnick – keyboards, vocals

=== Production ===
- Produced by Grateful Dead
- Compilation produced by David Lemieux and Blair Jackson
- CD mastering by Jeffrey Norman
- Cover art by Scott McDougall
- Photos by Susana Millman and Bob Minkin
- Package design by Steve Vance

== Set lists ==
Following are the complete set lists for the concerts excerpted on Road Trips Volume 2 Number 4

May 26, 1993

- First set: "Samson and Delilah"*, "Here Comes Sunshine"*, "Walkin' Blues"*, "Broken Arrow"**, "Ramble On Rose"**, "Stuck Inside of Mobile with the Memphis Blues Again"**, "Deal"*
- Second set: "Box of Rain"*, "Victim or the Crime"* > "Crazy Fingers"* > "Playing in the Band"* > "Drums"* > "Space" > "Corrina"* > "Playing in the Band"* > "China Doll"* > "Around and Around"*
- Encore: "Liberty"*

May 27, 1993

- First set: "Shakedown Street"*, "The Same Thing"*, "Dire Wolf"*, "Beat It On Down the Line", "High Time"*, "When I Paint My Masterpiece"*, "Cumberland Blues", "Promised Land"
- Second set: "Picasso Moon"** > "Fire on the Mountain"** > "Wave to the Wind", "Cassidy"** > "Uncle John's Band"** > "Cassidy"** > "Drums" > "Space" > "The Other One" > "Wharf Rat" > "Sugar Magnolia"
- Encore: "Gloria"**

*included on Road Trips Volume 2 Number 4
**included on bonus disc
