= To Terrapin: Hartford '77 =

Live album by Grateful Dead
- Released: April 7, 2009
- Recorded: May 28, 1977
- Genre: Rock
- Length: 182:19
- Label: Rhino
- Producer: David Lemieux

Grateful Dead chronology
Road Trips Volume 2 Number 2 (2009)	To Terrapin: Hartford '77 (2009)	Road Trips Volume 2 Number 3 (2009)

Professional ratings
Review scores
Source	Rating
All About Jazz	(favorable)
Allmusic	4/5 stars
The Best of Website	(A−)
The Music Box	5/5 stars

To Terrapin: Hartford '77 is a live album by the American rock band the Grateful Dead. It was recorded at the Hartford Civic Center in Hartford, Connecticut, on May 28, 1977, the last show of the band's 26-date East Coast tour in the spring of 1977. It was released by Rhino Records on April 7, 2009.

== Track listing ==
=== Disc one ===
First set:

1. "Bertha" > (Jerry Garcia, Robert Hunter) - 6:46
2. "Good Lovin'" > (Artie Resnick, Rudy Clark) - 5:34
3. "Sugaree" (Garcia, Hunter) - 19:18
4. "Jack Straw" (Bob Weir, Hunter) - 6:23
5. "Row Jimmy" (Garcia, Hunter) - 10:43

=== Disc two ===
First set, continued:

1. "New Minglewood Blues" (Noah Lewis) - 6:37
2. "Candyman" (Garcia, Hunter) - 7:04
3. "Passenger" (Phil Lesh, Peter Monk) - 3:40
4. "Brown-Eyed Women" (Garcia, Hunter) - 6:12
5. "Promised Land" (Chuck Berry) - 4:26

Second set:

6. "Samson and Delilah" (traditional, arr. Weir) - 8:05
7. "Tennessee Jed" (Garcia, Hunter) - 9:04

=== Disc three ===
Second set, continued:

1. "Estimated Prophet" > (John Perry Barlow, Weir) - 11:35
2. "Playing in the Band" > (Hunter, Mickey Hart, Weir) - 10:59
3. "Terrapin Station" > (Garcia, Hunter) - 11:06
4. "Drums" > (Hart, Bill Kreutzmann) - 1:30
5. "Not Fade Away" > (Buddy Holly, Norman Petty) - 15:11
6. "Wharf Rat" > (Hunter, Garcia) - 10:18
7. "Playing in the Band" (Hunter, Hart, Weir) - 6:42
8. "One More Saturday Night" (Weir) - 5:20

Encore:

9. "U.S. Blues" (Garcia, Hunter) - 6:47

== Personnel ==
=== Musicians ===
- Jerry Garcia – guitar, vocals
- Donna Godchaux – vocals
- Keith Godchaux – piano
- Mickey Hart – drums
- Bill Kreutzmann – drums
- Phil Lesh – electric bass
- Bob Weir – guitar, vocals

=== Production ===
- Produced for release by David Lemieux
- Recorded by Betty Cantor-Jackson
- CD Mastering by Jeffrey Norman at Garage Audio Mastering, Petaluma CA
- Cover art by Scott McDougall
- Art direction and design by Steve Vance
