= Fillmore West 1969: February 28th =

Live album by Grateful Dead
- Released: July 9, 2019
- Recorded: February 28, 1969
- Venue: Fillmore West; San Francisco
- Genre: Rock
- Label: Rhino
- Producer: Grateful Dead

Grateful Dead chronology
Dave's Picks Volume 30 (2019)	Fillmore West 1969: February 28th (2019)	Dave's Picks Volume 31 (2019)

Fillmore West 1969: February 28th is a live album by the rock band the Grateful Dead. As the name suggests, it was recorded on February 28, 1969, at the Fillmore West in San Francisco. It was produced as a five-disc vinyl LP. It was released on July 9, 2019, as part of Rhino Entertainment's celebration of the 50th anniversary of Woodstock.

The entire concert was previously released as part of the box set Fillmore West 1969: The Complete Recordings.

== Track listing ==
Side 1
First set:

1. "(Walk Me Out In The) Morning Dew" (Bonnie Dobson, Tim Rose) - 11:04
2. "Good Morning Little Schoolgirl" (Sonny Boy Williamson) - 11:00

Side 2

1. "Doin' That Rag" (Jerry Garcia, Robert Hunter) - 6:56
2. "I'm a King Bee" (Slim Harpo) - 7:09

Side 3

1. "Turn On Your Lovelight" (Joseph Scott, Deadric Malone) - 19:09

Side 4
Second set:

1. "That's It for the Other One" > (Garcia, Bill Kreutzmann, Bob Weir) - 19:46

Side 5

1. "Dark Star" > (Hunter, Garcia, Mickey Hart, Kreutzmann, Phil Lesh, Ron "Pigpen" McKernan, Weir) - 19:45

Side 6

1. "St. Stephen" > (Garcia, Hunter, Lesh) - 7:51
2. "The Eleven" > (Hunter, Lesh) - 15:12

Side 7

1. "Death Don't Have No Mercy" (Reverend Gary Davis) - 10:38
2. "Alligator" > (Hunter, Pigpen, Lesh) - 4:08
3. "Drums" > (Hart, Kreutzmann) - 4:02

Side 8

1. "Jam" > (Grateful Dead) - 14:57

Side 9

1. "Caution (Do Not Stop on Tracks)" > (Grateful Dead) - 8:47
2. "Feedback" > (Grateful Dead) - 5:40
3. "And We Bid You Goodnight" (traditional, arr. Grateful Dead) - 1:08

== Personnel ==
Grateful Dead

- Tom Constanten – keyboards
- Jerry Garcia – guitar, vocals
- Mickey Hart – drums
- Bill Kreutzmann – drums
- Phil Lesh – bass, vocals
- Ron "Pigpen" McKernan – keyboards, harmonica, vocals
- Bob Weir – guitar, vocals

Production

- Produced by Grateful Dead
- Produced for release by David Lemieux
- Recording: Bob Matthews, Betty Cantor
- Mastering: Jeffrey Norman
- Engineering: Chris Bellman, Jamie Howarth
- Art direction, design: Steve Vance
- Cover art: Tim McDonagh
