= Fillmore West 1969: February 27th =

Live album by Grateful Dead
- Released: April 21, 2018
- Recorded: February 27, 1969
- Venue: Fillmore West; San Francisco
- Genre: Rock
- Label: Rhino
- Producer: Grateful Dead

Grateful Dead chronology
The Best of the Grateful Dead Live (2018)	Fillmore West 1969: February 27th (2018)	Dave's Picks Volume 26 (2018)

Fillmore West 1969: February 27th is a live album by the rock band the Grateful Dead. As the name suggests, it was recorded on February 27, 1969, at the Fillmore West in San Francisco. It was produced as a four-disc vinyl LP, in a limited edition of 9,000 copies. It was released on April 21, 2018, in conjunction with Record Store Day.

This performance of the songs "Dark Star" and "St. Stephen" was originally released on the 1969 album Live/Dead. "That's It for the Other One" was originally released on the 1999 album So Many Roads (1965–1995). "Cosmic Charlie" was originally released on the 2005 album Fillmore West 1969. The entire concert was previously released as part of the box set Fillmore West 1969: The Complete Recordings.

The concert was the first of a four-night run at the Fillmore West – Thursday February 27 through Sunday March 2, 1969. At these shows, the opening acts were the Sir Douglas Quintet and Pentangle.

== Track listing ==
Side 1

1. "Good Morning Little Schoolgirl" (Sonny Boy Williamson) – 11:55
2. "Doin' That Rag" (Jerry Garcia, Robert Hunter) – 7:29

Side 2

1. "That's It for the Other One" – 20:31

- "Cryptical Envelopment" (Garcia)
- "The Other One" (Bob Weir, Bill Kreutzmann)
- "Cryptical Envelopment" (Garcia)

Side 3

1. "Dupree's Diamond Blues" (Garcia, Hunter) – 4:01
2. "Mountains of the Moon" (Garcia, Hunter) – 6:13

Side 4

1. "Dark Star" (Garcia, Mickey Hart, Kreutzmann, Phil Lesh, Ron "Pigpen" McKernan, Weir, Hunter) – 22:21

Side 5

1. "St. Stephen" (Garcia, Lesh, Hunter) – 8:22
2. "The Eleven" (Lesh, Hunter) – 13:12

Side 6

1. "Turn On Your Lovelight" (Joseph Scott, Deadric Malone) – 17:46

Side 7

1. "Cosmic Charlie" (Garcia, Hunter) – 6:29

Note: The first set of the concert is on sides 1 and 2. The second set is on sides 3, 4, 5, and 6. The encore is on side 7. An etching of the cover art is on side 8.

== Personnel ==
Grateful Dead

- Tom Constanten – keyboards
- Jerry Garcia – guitar, vocals
- Mickey Hart – drums
- Bill Kreutzmann – drums
- Phil Lesh – bass, vocals
- Ron "Pigpen" McKernan – keyboards, harmonica, vocals
- Bob Weir – guitar, vocals

Production

- Produced by Grateful Dead
- Produced for release by David Lemieux
- Recording: Bob Matthews, Betty Cantor
- Mastering: Jeffrey Norman
- Engineering: Chris Bellman, Jamie Howarth
- Art direction, design: Steve Vance
- Cover art: Tim McDonagh
