= Road Trips Volume 4 Number 1 =

Live album by Grateful Dead
- Released: November 16, 2010
- Recorded: May 23–24, 1969
- Genre: Rock
- Length: 184:53
- Label: Grateful Dead
- Producer: Owsley Stanley; David Lemieux; Blair Jackson

Grateful Dead chronology
| The Warner Bros. Studio Albums (2010) | Road Trips Volume 4 Number 1 (2010) | Road Trips Volume 4 Number 2 (2011) |

Road Trips Volume 4 Number 1 is a live album by the rock band the Grateful Dead. The 13th of the Road Trips series of archival releases, it contains two complete performances by the band, recorded on May 23 and 24, 1969. It was released as a three-disc CD on November 16, 2010.

Road Trips Volume 4 Number 1 is subtitled Big Rock Pow-Wow '69. It was recorded at a rock festival called the Big Rock Pow-Wow, which took place on Friday, Saturday, and Sunday, May 23, 24, and 25, 1969, at the Hollywood Seminole Indian Reservation in West Hollywood, Florida. Other artists who performed at the festival included Johnny Winter, Sweetwater, Joe South, Aum, NRBQ, Rhinoceros, Muddy Waters, and the Youngbloods. At the end of the Saturday night concert, Timothy Leary spoke from the stage.

== Critical reception ==
Professional ratings
Review scores
| Source | Rating |
|---|---|
| The Music Box | 4/5 stars |

Writing in All About Jazz, Doug Collette said, "Recorded in May, 1969 at a Seminole Reservation in Florida, Road Trips Vol. 4 No. 1 hearkens back to the first golden age of the Grateful Dead. The previous twelve months found the group solidify its personnel lineup with the addition of drummer Mickey Hart, nurture a prolific songwriting relationship with lyricist Robert Hunter and hone a collective and individual improvisational sense, the chemistry of which allowed for what was to be the comparatively short-lived, but nonetheless significant inclusion of keyboardist Tom Constanten.... As presented on these vintage recordings, the Grateful Dead was well on its way to an all-around mastery of concert dynamics. It's not quite entirely accurate to say performances like this one merely sowed the seeds for the continuing evolution of the Grateful Dead; it's more accurate to state the sound and overall approach of the group is in its first full flowering, as the 1960s it epitomized drew to a close."

In The Music Box, John Metzger wrote, "Considering that the performances highlighted on Road Trips, Vol. 4, No. 1 were recorded at a two-night festival engagement, it isn't surprising that the collection lacks the depth of some of the Grateful Dead's full-length concerts from the era. The time constraints placed upon the band undoubtedly caused it to alter its plan of attack. The result is something considerably less epic than its shows at either the Fillmore East or the Fillmore West. Regardless, Road Trips, Vol. 4, No. 1 is a delightful romp through the Grateful Dead's early songbook. After all, even when the outfit was forced to work within a schedule that was tighter than usual, it still found ways of showcasing its immense range."

== Track listing ==
=== Disc one ===
May 23, 1969:

1. "Hard to Handle" (Otis Redding) – 5:47
2. "Dark Star" > (Jerry Garcia, Mickey Hart, Bill Kreutzmann, Phil Lesh, Ron "Pigpen" McKernan, Bob Weir, Robert Hunter) – 18:56
3. "St. Stephen" > (Garcia, Lesh, Hunter) – 9:01
4. "The Eleven" > (Garcia, Lesh, Hunter) – 10:38
5. "Turn On Your Lovelight" (Deadric Malone, Joseph Scott) – 30:59

=== Disc two ===
May 24, 1969:

1. Introduction – 4:27
2. "Turn On Your Lovelight" (Malone, Scott) – 27:27
3. "Doin' That Rag" > (Garcia, Hunter) – 6:43
4. "He Was a Friend of Mine" ("Just a Hand to Hold") > (Mark Spoelstra) – 8:49
5. "China Cat Sunflower" > (Garcia, Hunter) – 5:24
6. "The Eleven" > (Garcia, Lesh, Hunter) – 8:17
7. "Death Don't Have No Mercy" (Reverend Gary Davis) – 7:00

=== Disc three ===
May 23, 1969:

1. "Morning Dew" (Bonnie Dobson, Tim Rose) – 9:44
2. "Me and My Uncle" (John Phillips) – 3:17

May 24, 1969:

3. "The Yellow Dog Story" (Weir) – 3:12
4. "Alligator" > (Lesh, McKernan, Hunter) – 4:00
5. "Drums" > (Hart, Kreutzmann) – 7:33
6. "St. Stephen" > (Garcia, Lesh, Hunter) – 5:58
7. "Feedback" > (Grateful Dead) – 4:17
8. "We Bid You Goodnight" (traditional, arranged by Grateful Dead) – 3:22

== Personnel ==
=== Grateful Dead ===
- Tom Constanten – keyboards
- Jerry Garcia – lead guitar, vocals
- Mickey Hart – drums
- Bill Kreutzmann – drums
- Phil Lesh – electric bass, vocals
- Ron "Pigpen" McKernan – vocals, percussion
- Bob Weir – rhythm guitar, vocals

=== Production ===
- Owsley Stanley – original recording producer
- David Lemieux – release producer
- Blair Jackson – release producer
- Jeffrey Norman – CD mastering
- Scott McDougall – cover art
- Rosie McGee – photography
- Jim Wiseman – photography
- Steve Vance – package design
- Blair Jackson – liner notes
- Tom Constanten – liner notes

== Set lists ==
Following are the full set lists for the Big Rock Pow Wow concerts:

May 23, 1969

"Hard to Handle", "Morning Dew", "Me and My Uncle", "Dark Star" > "St. Stephen" > "The Eleven" > "Turn On Your Lovelight"

May 24, 1969

"Turn On Your Lovelight", "Doin' That Rag" > "He Was a Friend of Mine" > "China Cat Sunflower" > "The Eleven" > "Death Don't Have No Mercy", "Alligator" > "Drums" > "St. Stephen" > "Feedback" > "We Bid You Goodnight"
