= Dave's Picks Volume 6 =

Live album by Grateful Dead
- Released: May 1, 2013
- Recorded: December 20, 1969, Fillmore Auditorium, San Francisco, California, United States and February 2, 1970, Fox Theater, St. Louis, Missouri, United States
- Genre: Rock
- Length: 228:24
- Label: Rhino
- Producer: Grateful Dead

Grateful Dead chronology
Dave's Picks Volume 5 (2013)	Dave's Picks Volume 6 (2013)	May 1977 (2013)

Alternative cover
- Dave's Picks 2013 Bonus Disc

Dave's Picks Volume 6 is a three-CD live album by the rock band the Grateful Dead. It contains two complete concerts: one from December 20, 1969, at the Fillmore Auditorium in San Francisco and the second from February 2, 1970, at the Fox Theatre in St. Louis. It was produced as a limited edition of 13,000 numbered copies, and was released on May 1, 2013.

Dave's Picks Volume 6 includes long-lost recordings that were given back to the Grateful Dead organization shortly before the production of the album. Both shows were recorded by Owsley "Bear" Stanley.

Keyboardist Tom Constanten was a member of the Grateful Dead at the time of the Fillmore Auditorium concert, but he left the band before the Fox Theatre concert. Constanten wrote the liner notes for the album.

A bonus disc was included with shipments of the album to 2013 Dave's Picks subscribers. This disc contains tracks recorded on December 21, 1969 at the Fillmore Auditorium in San Francisco, California.

== Critical reception ==
Professional ratings
Review scores
Source	Rating
Allmusic	4/5 stars
All About Jazz	4/5 stars

On Allmusic, Fred Thomas said, "These shows from late 1969 in San Francisco and early 1970 in St. Louis feature a vibrant document of the phase in the band right before the recording of the breakthrough Workingman's Dead album, including epic performances of "Dark Star", early performances of "New Speedway Boogie", and a jammed-out version of "Turn on Your Lovelight" that spans over 35 minutes."

In All About Jazz, Doug Collette wrote, "Dave's Picks Volume 6 represents an important entry in this Grateful Dead archive series, on its own terms and as a crucial reminder of how this iconic band evolved around the cusp of the 1960s and the 1970s. Plus which, the sound quality of the recordings, originally administered by the famous Owsley "Bear" Stanley, is as notable as the evolving style of the group itself."

== Track listing ==
Disc 1

February 2, 1970 – Fox Theatre

1. "Casey Jones" (Jerry Garcia, Robert Hunter) – 4:31
2. "Mama Tried" (Merle Haggard) – 3:03
3. "Hard to Handle" (Alvertis Isbell, Allen Jones, Otis Redding) – 5:39
4. "Cold Rain and Snow" (traditional, arranged by Grateful Dead) – 5:32
5. "Black Peter" (Garcia, Hunter) – 9:49
6. "Cumberland Blues" (Garcia, Lesh, Hunter) – 5:14
7. "Dark Star" > (Garcia, Hunter, Mickey Hart, Bill Kreutzmann, Phil Lesh, Ron "Pigpen" McKernan, Bob Weir) – 22:00
8. "St. Stephen" > (Garcia, Lesh, Hunter) – 5:11
9. "Mason's Children" (Garcia, Hunter, Lesh, Weir) – 5:29
10. "Good Lovin'" > (Rudy Clark, Arthur Resnick) – 5:09
11. "Uncle John's Band" (Garcia, Hunter) – 6:37

Disc 2

1. "Turn On Your Lovelight >" (Joseph Scott, Deadric Malone) – 14:06
2. "Not Fade Away" > (Norman Petty, Charles Hardin) – 1:20
3. "Turn On Your Lovelight" (Scott, Malone) – 3:38
4. "And We Bid You Goodnight" (traditional, arranged by Grateful Dead) – 3:07

December 20, 1969 – Fillmore Auditorium

5. "Dark Star" > (Garcia, Hart, Hunter, Kreutzmann, Lesh, McKernan, Weir) – 20:38
6. "St. Stephen" > (Garcia, Lesh, Hunter) – 10:40
7. "The Eleven" > (Lesh, Hunter) – 11:32
8. "New Speedway Boogie" (Garcia, Hunter) – 8:27

Disc 3

1. "Turn On Your Lovelight" (Scott, Malone) – 35:15
2. "Mason's Children" (Garcia, Hunter, Lesh, Weir) – 7:19
3. "China Cat Sunflower >" (Garcia, Hunter) – 5:31
4. "I Know You Rider" (traditional, arranged by Grateful Dead) – 6:07
5. "High Time" (Garcia, Hunter) – 8:16
6. "Me and My Uncle" (John Phillips) – 3:30
7. "Hard to Handle" (Isbell, Jones, Redding) – 5:11
8. "Cumberland Blues" (Garcia, Hunter, Lesh) – 5:33

Dave's Picks 2013 Bonus Disc

December 21, 1969 – Fillmore Auditorium

1. "Smokestack Lightning" (Chester Burnett) – 11:26
2. "New Speedway Boogie" (Garcia, Hunter) – 5:09
3. "Dire Wolf" (Garcia, Hunter) – 5:03
4. "Mason’s Children" (Garcia, Hunter, Lesh, Weir) – 6:38
5. "China Cat Sunflower" > (Garcia, Hunter) – 5:14
6. "I Know You Rider" (traditional, arranged by Grateful Dead) – 5:27
7. "Black Peter" (Garcia, Hunter) – 9:33
8. "Good Lovin'" > (Clark, Resnick) – 1:51
9. "Drums" > (Hart, Kreutzmann) – 6:28
10. "The Other One" (Kreutzmann, Weir) – 13:06
11. "Cumberland Blues" (Garcia, Hunter, Lesh) – 5:30

Note: The set list for the December 21, 1969 Fillmore show was:

"Smokestack Lightning"^{[A]} · "New Speedway Boogie"^{[A]} · "Mama Tried" · "Dire Wolf"^{[A]} · "Mason's Children"^{[A]} · "China Cat Sunflower"^{[A]} · "I Know You Rider"^{[A]} · "Black Peter"^{[A]} · "Not Fade Away" · "Uncle John's Band" · "High Time" · "Good Lovin'"^{[A]} · "Drums"^{[A]} · "The Other One"^{[A]} · "Cumberland Blues"^{[A]}

[A] Included in Dave's Picks 2013 Bonus Disc

== Personnel ==
Grateful Dead

- Tom Constanten – keyboards (Fillmore concert), liner notes
- Jerry Garcia – lead guitar, vocals
- Mickey Hart – drums and percussion
- Bill Kreutzmann – drums and percussion
- Phil Lesh – bass guitar, vocals
- Ron "Pigpen" McKernan – keyboards (Fox Theatre concert), harmonica, percussion, vocals
- Bob Weir – rhythm guitar, vocals

Technical personnel

- David Lemieux – production, liner notes
- Nicholas Meriwether – archival research
- Jeffrey Norman – mastering
- Mark Pinkus – executive production
- Owsley Stanley – recording
- Timothy Truman – cover art
- Doran Tyson – associate production
- Steve Vance – art direction and design
- Ken Winn of Wolfgang's Vault – photography
