= The Best of the Grateful Dead Live =

Greatest hits album by Grateful Dead
- Released: March 23, 2018
- Recorded: 1969–1995
- Genre: Rock
- Label: Rhino

Grateful Dead chronology
Dave's Picks Volume 25 (2018)	The Best of the Grateful Dead Live (2018)	Fillmore West 1969: February 27th (2018)

The Best of the Grateful Dead Live is a greatest hits album by the rock band the Grateful Dead. It contains songs that were recorded live in concert and previously released on other Grateful Dead live albums. It was released on March 23, 2018.

== Production ==
According to producer David Lemieux, "We wanted to follow up the 2015 The Best of the Grateful Dead studio set with a live counterpart, and have focused our efforts on the band's primary live albums as well as some key tracks from archival concert releases."

== Critical reception ==
On AllMusic, Timothy Monger said, "Created as a counterpart to their 2015 two-disc Best of the Grateful Dead studio collection, The Best of the Grateful Dead Live includes highlights culled from the band's commercially released concert albums on the Warner Bros. and Arista labels as well as a handful of live selections from their own personal archives."

In All About Jazz, Doug Collette wrote, "The Best of the Grateful Dead Live doesn't purport to be comprehensive, but it does offer the novice virtually all the necessary touch-points by which to become more intimately acquainted with the unit's entire body of work (the exception, omitted no doubt by time constraints: any example of Ron "Pigpen" McKernan's extended stage spotlights)."

== Track listing ==
Disc one
No.	Title	Writer(s)	Recorded	Previously released	Length
1.	"St. Stephen"	Jerry Garcia, Phil Lesh, Robert Hunter	February 27, 1969; Fillmore West; San Francisco	Live/Dead	6:37
2.	"Bertha"	Garcia, Hunter	April 27, 1971; Fillmore East; New York City	Grateful Dead	5:42
3.	"Wharf Rat"	Garcia, Hunter	April 26, 1971; Fillmore East; New York City	Grateful Dead	8:32
4.	"Sugar Magnolia"	Bob Weir, Hunter	May 4, 1972; Olympia Theatre; Paris	Europe '72	7:10
5.	"Jack Straw"	Weir, Hunter	May 3, 1972; Olympia Theatre; Paris	Europe '72	4:48
6.	"Truckin'"	Garcia, Lesh, Weir, Hunter	May 26, 1972; Lyceum Theatre; London	Europe '72	13:07
7.	"Morning Dew"	Bonnie Dobson, Tim Rose	May 26, 1972; Lyceum Theatre; London	Europe '72	11:28
8.	"Brown-Eyed Women"	Garcia, Hunter	April 14, 1972; Tivoli Concert Hall; Copenhagen	Europe '72	4:37
9.	"The Music Never Stopped"	Weir, John Barlow	August 13, 1975; Great American Music Hall; San Francisco	One from the Vault	5:28
10.	"Estimated Prophet"	Weir, Barlow	May 8, 1977; Barton Hall; Ithaca, New York	Cornell 5/8/77	8:44
Disc two
No.	Title	Writer(s)	Recorded	Previously released	Length
1.	"Friend of the Devil"	Garcia, John Dawson, Hunter	October 27, 1980; Radio City Music Hall; New York City	Dead Set	7:32
2.	"Feel Like a Stranger"	Weir, Barlow	October 4, 1980; Warfield Theatre; San Francisco	Dead Set	5:46
3.	"Fire on the Mountain"	Mickey Hart, Hunter	October 31, 1980; Radio City Music Hall; New York City	Dead Set	6:47
4.	"Bird Song"	Garcia, Hunter	October 14, 1980; Warfield Theatre; San Francisco	Reckoning	7:38
5.	"Ripple"	Garcia, Hunter	October 4, 1980; Warfield Theatre; San Francisco	Reckoning	4:26
6.	"Eyes of the World"	Garcia, Hunter	March 29, 1990; Nassau Coliseum; Uniondale, New York	Without a Net	16:13
7.	"Touch of Grey"	Garcia, Hunter	July 4, 1989; Rich Stadium; Orchard Park, New York	Truckin' Up to Buffalo	6:30
8.	"Blow Away"	Brent Mydland, Hunter	July 7, 1989; John F. Kennedy Stadium; Philadelphia	Crimson White & Indigo	12:19
9.	"So Many Roads"	Garcia, Hunter	July 9, 1995; Soldier Field; Chicago	So Many Roads (1965–1995)	9:35

== Personnel ==
Grateful Dead

- Jerry Garcia – guitar, vocals
- Bob Weir – guitar, vocals
- Phil Lesh – bass, vocals
- Bill Kreutzmann – drums, percussion
- Mickey Hart – drums, percussion on "St. Stephen", "The Music Never Stopped", "Estimated Prophet", "Friend of the Devil", "Feel Like a Stranger", "Fire on the Mountain", "Bird Song", "Ripple", "Eyes of the World", "Touch of Grey", "Blow Away", "So Many Roads"
- Ron "Pigpen" McKernan – organ, harmonica, percussion, vocals on "St. Stephen", "Bertha", "Wharf Rat", "Sugar Magnolia", "Jack Straw", "Truckin'", "Morning Dew", "Brown-Eyed Women"
- Tom Constanten – keyboards on "St. Stephen"
- Keith Godchaux – keyboards on "Sugar Magnolia", "Jack Straw", "Truckin'", "Morning Dew", "Brown-Eyed Women", "The Music Never Stopped", "Estimated Prophet"
- Donna Jean Godchaux – vocals on "Sugar Magnolia", "Jack Straw", "Truckin'", "Morning Dew", "Brown-Eyed Women", "The Music Never Stopped", "Estimated Prophet"
- Brent Mydland – keyboards, vocals on "Friend of the Devil", "Feel Like a Stranger", "Fire on the Mountain", "Bird Song", "Ripple", "Eyes of the World", "Touch of Grey", "Blow Away"
- Vince Welnick – keyboards, vocals on "So Many Roads"

Additional musicians

- Merl Saunders – organ on "Bertha", "Wharf Rat"
- Branford Marsalis – saxophone on "Eyes of the World"

== Charts ==
Chart (2018)	Peak position
Hungarian Albums (MAHASZ)	37
US Billboard 200	167
