= Dave's Picks Volume 30 =

Live album by Grateful Dead
- Released: May 3, 2019
- Recorded: January 2, 1970
- Venue: Fillmore East, New York City
- Genre: Rock
- Length: 228:41 (Bonus disc 78:11)
- Label: Rhino (R2-573508)
- Producer: Grateful Dead

Grateful Dead chronology
Sage & Spirit (2019)	Dave's Picks Volume 30 (2019)	Fillmore West 1969: February 28th (2019)

Alternative cover
- Dave's Picks 2019 Bonus Disc

Dave's Picks Volume 30 is a 3-CD live album by the rock band the Grateful Dead. It contains the complete early and late shows recorded on January 2, 1970 at the Fillmore East in New York City, along with five songs from the band's performances at the same venue the following night. It was released on May 3, 2019 in a limited edition of 20,000 copies.

Some copies of the album also include the Dave's Picks 2019 Bonus Disc. The additional CD contains ten more songs from the January 3 concerts.

Dave's Picks Volume 30 includes psychedelic rock songs such as the ones on the band's then-recent albums Anthem of the Sun, Aoxomoxoa, and Live/Dead, as well as folk rock songs like the ones on their album Workingman's Dead, which would not be released until five months after these concerts. The Dead's musical lineup included keyboardist Tom Constanten, who would leave the band about three weeks later.

== Recording ==
On Friday and Saturday night, January 2 and 3, 1970, the Grateful Dead played early and late shows at the Fillmore East in New York City. Their performances were recorded by their audio engineer Owsley Stanley. The concerts were promoted by Bill Graham. Appearing on the same bill were the bands Lighthouse and Cold Blood.

== Critical reception ==
On AllMusic, Timothy Monger wrote, "Covering an interesting period of the Grateful Dead's history, Dave's Picks, Vol. 30 brings listeners to January 1970, when the band was transitioning out of the exploratory electric psych rock of the late '60s and into their more acoustic Americana period."

== Track listing ==
Disc 1

January 2, 1970 early show:

1. "Mason's Children" (Jerry Garcia, Bob Weir, Phil Lesh, Robert Hunter) – 6:12 (Note: Previously released on Fallout from the Phil Zone)
2. "Casey Jones" (Garcia, Hunter) – 4:28
3. "Black Peter" (Garcia, Hunter) – 12:21
4. "Mama Tried" (Merle Haggard) – 2:29
5. "Hard to Handle" (Otis Redding, Al Bell, Allen Jones) – 5:02
6. "Cumberland Blues" (Garcia, Lesh, Hunter) – 5:42
7. "That's It for the Other One" – 18:19

I. "Cryptical Envelopment" (Garcia)
II. "Drums" (Mickey Hart, Bill Kreutzmann)
III. "The Other One" (Weir, Kreutzmann)
IV. "Cryptical Envelopment" (Garcia)

8. "Cosmic Charlie" (Garcia, Hunter) – 7:06

January 2, 1970 late show:

9. "Uncle John's Band" (Garcia, Hunter) – 7:24
10. "High Time" (Gracia, Hunter) – 7:22

Disc 2

1. "Dire Wolf" (Garcia, Hunter) – 4:43
2. "Easy Wind" (Hunter) – 7:49
3. "China Cat Sunflower" (Garcia, Hunter) – 4:47
4. "I Know You Rider" (traditional, arranged by Grateful Dead) – 4:12
5. "Good Lovin'" (Rudy Clark, Artie Resnick) – 7:24
6. "Me and My Uncle" (John Phillips) – 4:33
7. "Monkey and the Engineer" (Jesse Fuller) – 1:54

January 3, 1970 bonus tracks:

8. "Morning Dew" (Bonnie Dobson, Tim Rose) – 10:00
9. "Big Boss Man" (Al Smith, Luther Dixon) – 4:24
10. "Dancing in the Street" (William "Mickey" Stevenson, Marvin Gaye, Ivy Jo Hunter) – 10:50
11. "St. Stephen" (Garcia, Lesh, Hunter) – 6:14
12. "In the Midnight Hour" (Steve Cropper, Wilson Pickett) – 9:31

Disc 3

January 2, 1970 late show, continued:

1. "Dark Star" (Garcia, Hart, Kreutzmann, Lesh, Ron "Pigpen" McKernan, Weir, Hunter) – 32:12 (Note: Contains a patch from the February 14, 1970 early show)
2. "St. Stephen" (Garcia, Lesh, Hunter) – 9:16
3. "The Eleven" (Lesh, Hunter) – 10:28
4. "Turn On Your Lovelight" (Joe Scott, Deadric Malone) – 22:50

Dave's Picks 2019 Bonus Disc

January 3, 1970 selections:

1. "Cold Rain and Snow" (traditional, arranged by Grateful Dead) – 6:07
2. "Alligator" > (Lesh, McKernan, Hunter) – 4:00
3. "Drums" > (Hart, Kreutzmann) – 1:59
4. "Alligator" > (Lesh, McKernan, Hunter) – 12:07
5. "Feedback" (Grateful Dead) – 6:37
6. "Casey Jones" (Garcia, Hunter) – 4:59
7. "Mason's Children" (Garcia, Weir, Lesh, Hunter) – 5:39
8. "That's It for the Other One" – 21:57

I. "Cryptical Envelopment" (Garcia)
II. "Drums" (Hart, Kreutzmann)
III. "The Other One" (Weir, Kreutzmann)
IV. "Cryptical Envelopment" (Garcia)

9. "Cosmic Charlie" (Garcia, Hunter) – 7:46
10. "Uncle John's Band " (Garcia, Hunter) – 6:58

== Concert set lists ==
The set lists for the concerts were:

January 2, 1970:

Early show: "Mason's Children", "Casey Jones", "Black Peter", "Mama Tried", "Hard to Handle", "Cumberland Blues", "Cryptical Envelopment", "Drums", "The Other One", "Cryptical Envelopment", "Cosmic Charlie"

Late show: "Uncle John's Band", "High Time", "Dire Wolf", "Easy Wind", "China Cat Sunflower", "I Know You Rider", "Good Lovin'", "Me and My Uncle", "Monkey and the Engineer", "Dark Star", "St. Stephen", "The Eleven", "Turn On Your Lovelight"

January 3, 1970:

Early show: "Morning Dew",^{[a]} "Me and My Uncle",^{[c]} "Hard to Handle",^{[c]} "Cumberland Blues",^{[c]} Cold Rain and Snow",^{[b]} "Alligator",^{[b]} "Drums",^{[b]} "Alligator",^{[b]} "Feedback"^{[b]} Encore: "Uncle John's Band"^{[c]}

Late show: "Casey Jones",^{[b]} "Mama Tried",^{[c]} "Big Boss Man",^{[a]} "China Cat Sunflower",^{[c]} "I Know You Rider",^{[c]} "Mason's Children",^{[b]} "Cryptical Envelopment",^{[b]} "Drums",^{[b]} "The Other One",^{[b]} "Cryptical Envelopment",^{[b]} "Cosmic Charlie",^{[b]} "Uncle John's Band",^{[b]} "Black Peter",^{[c]} "Dire Wolf",^{[c]} "Good Lovin'",^{[c]} "Dancing in the Street"^{[a]} Encore: "St. Stephen",^{[a]} "In the Midnight Hour"^{[a]}

[a] On disc 2
[b] On bonus disc
[c] Not included

== Personnel ==
Grateful Dead

- Jerry Garcia – guitar, vocals
- Bob Weir – guitar, vocals
- Phil Lesh – bass, vocals
- Ron "Pigpen" McKernan – harmonica, percussion, vocals
- Tom Constanten – keyboards
- Bill Kreutzmann – drums
- Mickey Hart – drums

Production

- Produced by Grateful Dead
- Produced for release by David Lemieux
- Associate Producers: Ivette Ramos & Doran Tyson
- Recording: Owsley Stanley
- Mastering: Jeffrey Norman
- Art direction, design: Steve Vance
- Cover art: Tyler Crook
- Photos: Amalie R. Rothschild
- Liner notes: Strider Brown, Jeffrey Taylor, Starfinder Stanley, Hawk

== Charts ==
Chart (2019)	Peak position
US Billboard 200	34
