= Road Trips Volume 2 Number 2 =

2009 live album by Grateful Dead

Live album by Grateful Dead
- Released: March 21, 2009
- Recorded: February 14, 1968 (principal recording); January–February, 1968 (bonus tracks)
- Genres: Rock, jam
- Length: 156:48 bonus disc: 77:57
- Label: Grateful Dead
- Producer: Grateful Dead

Grateful Dead chronology
Road Trips Volume 2 Number 1 (2008)	Road Trips Volume 2 Number 2 (2009)	To Terrapin: Hartford '77 (2009)

Alternative cover
- Road Trips Volume 2 Number 2 Bonus Disc

Professional ratings
Review scores
Source	Rating
All About Jazz	(favorable)
Allmusic	4.5/5 stars
The Best Of Website	(A+)
The Music Box	4/5 stars

Road Trips Volume 2 Number 2 is a two-CD live album by the American rock band the Grateful Dead. The sixth in their "Road Trips" series of albums, it was the first to contain a complete concert—the February 14, 1968, show at the Carousel Ballroom (later known as the Fillmore West) in San Francisco, California. Bonus material on Disc 1, as well as the bonus disc offered to early purchasers, comes from the Grateful Dead and Quicksilver Messenger Service "Tour of the Great Pacific Northwest", immediately preceding the Carousel Ballroom show. The album was released on March 21, 2009.

== The Carousel & Seattle concerts ==
Although the Valentine's Day show at the Carousel was not the first rock concert there, it was the first show under the management auspices of the Dead, Quicksilver and Jefferson Airplane, who had leased the venue to compete with the Avalon Ballroom and Bill Graham's Fillmore Auditorium. Thus, the show was billed as the "Grand Opening". The Grateful Dead shared the bill with Country Joe and the Fish. The cover of Road Trips Volume 2 Number 2 incorporates artwork by Stanley Mouse that was used in the poster promoting the concert.

Live material from this show, along with recordings of other concerts from the same era, was used in the creation of Anthem of the Sun, a Dead album that is an amalgam of studio and live material.

The seven tracks from Seattle are believed to have been mislabeled. The show actually occurred on January 27, 1968, not January 23.

Road Trips Volume 2 Number 2 contains two performances of "Dark Star" — one from the February 14, 1968 concert at the Carousel Ballroom, and one from February 2, 1968, at the Crystal Ballroom in Portland, Oregon. A third performance of the song, from the Eagles Auditorium in Seattle, Washington, is included on the bonus disc.

== Track listing ==
Disc one

First set:

1. "(Walk Me Out in the) Morning Dew" (Bonnie Dobson, Tim Rose) – 6:30
2. "Good Morning Little School Girl" (Sonny Boy Williamson) – 12:35
3. "Dark Star" (Jerry Garcia, Mickey Hart, Bill Kreutzmann, Phil Lesh, Ron "Pigpen" McKernan, Bob Weir, Robert Hunter) – 6:10 →
4. "China Cat Sunflower" (Garcia, Hunter) – 4:25 →
5. "The Eleven" (Lesh, Hunter) – 5:15 →
6. "Turn On Your Love Light" (Joe Scott, Deadric Malone) – 9:02

Bonus material, January–February 1968

7. "Viola Lee Blues" (Noah Lewis) (1/20/68 Eureka, CA) – 20:38
8. "Beat It On Down the Line" (Jesse Fuller) (1/23/68 Seattle, WA) – 3:38
9. "It Hurts Me Too" (Elmore James) (1/23/68 Seattle, WA) – 4:20
10. "Dark Star" (Grateful Dead, Hunter) (2/2/68 Portland, OR) – 6:40

Disc two

Second set:

1. "That's It for the Other One" – 9:30 →
  - "Cryptical Envelopment" (Garcia)
  - "The Other One" (Weir, Kreutzmann)
  - "Cryptical Envelopment" (Garcia)
2. "New Potato Caboose" (Lesh, Robert Petersen) – 8:48 →
3. "Born Cross-Eyed" (Weir) – 2:38 →
4. "Spanish Jam" (Grateful Dead) – 12:28
5. "Alligator" (Lesh, McKernan, Hunter) – 14:30 →
6. "Caution (Do Not Stop on Tracks)" (Garcia, Kreutzmann, Lesh, McKernan, Weir) – 10:00 →
7. "Feedback" (Garcia, Kreutzmann, Lesh, McKernan, Weir) – 6:10

Encore:

8. "In the Midnight Hour" (Steve Cropper, Wilson Pickett) – 10:35

Bonus disc

Bonus material, January 1968:

1. "Viola Lee Blues" (Noah Lewis) (1/23/68 Seattle, WA) – 22:46
2. "Good Morning Little School Girl" (Sonny Boy Williamson) (1/20/68 Eureka, CA) – 12:14
3. "New Potato Caboose" (Lesh, Petersen) (1/30/68 Eugene, OR) – 12:40
4. "Dark Star" (Grateful Dead, Hunter) (1/23/68 Seattle, WA) – 7:45 →
5. "China Cat Sunflower" (Garcia, Hunter) (1/23/68 Seattle, WA) – 5:08 →
6. "The Eleven" (Hunter, Lesh) (1/23/68 Seattle, WA) – 6:00
7. "Turn On Your Love Light" (Scott, Malone) (1/23/68 Seattle, WA) – 12:55

== Personnel ==
=== Musicians ===
- Jerry Garcia – lead guitar, vocals
- Mickey Hart – drums
- Bill Kreutzmann – drums
- Phil Lesh – electric bass, vocals
- Ron "Pigpen" McKernan – organ, vocals
- Bob Weir – rhythm guitar, vocals

=== Production ===
- Produced by Grateful Dead
- Compilation produced by David Lemieux and Blair Jackson
- Recorded by Dan Healy
- CD Mastering by Jeffrey Norman at Garage Audio Mastering, Petaluma CA
- Audio Restoration by Jamie Howarth / Plangent Processes
- Cover art by Scott McDougall
- Original Poster by Stanley Mouse
- Photo by Ted Streshinsky
- Package design by Steve Vance
- Special Thanks to Matt Smith

== Record Store Day release ==
Carousel Ballroom, San Francisco, CA, 2/14/68

Live album by Grateful Dead
- Released: November 27, 2026
- Recorded: February 14, 1968
- Venue: Carousel Ballroom
- Genre: Rock
- Label: Rhino

Grateful Dead chronology
Dave's Picks Volume 60 (2026)	Carousel Ballroom, San Francisco, CA, 2/14/68 (2026)	Dave's Picks Volume 61 (2027)

On November 27, 2026, the same concert appearing on Road Trips Volume 2 Number 2 is set to be released as Carousel Ballroom, San Francisco, CA, 2/14/68, a 4-LP set for Record Store Day Black Friday.

=== LP track listing ===
Side 1

1. "Morning Dew" (Dobson, Rose)
2. "Good Morning Little School Girl" (Williamson)

Side 2

1. "Dark Star" (Garcia, Hart, Kreutzmann, Lesh, McKernan, Weir, Hunter)
2. "China Cat Sunflower" (Garcia, Hunter)
3. "The Eleven" (Lesh, Hunter)

Side 3

1. "Turn On Your Lovelight" (Scott, Malone)

Side 4

1. "That's It for the Other One" (Garcia, Weir, Kreutzmann)
2. "New Potato Caboose" (Lesh, Petersen)
3. "Born Cross-Eyed" (Weir)

Side 5

1. "Spanish Jam" (Grateful Dead)
2. "Alligator" (Lesh, McKernan, Hunter)

Side 6

1. "Alligator" (Lesh, McKernan, Hunter)
2. "Caution (Do Not Stop on Tracks)" (Garcia, Kreutzmann, Lesh, McKernan, Weir)

Side 7

1. "Feedback" (Grateful Dead)
2. "In the Midnight Hour" (Pickett, Cropper)

Side 8

- This LP side is an etching illustration
