= Fillmore West 1969 =

Live album by Grateful Dead
- Released: November 2005
- Recorded: February 27 – March 2, 1969
- Venue: Fillmore West
- Genres: Psychedelic rock, jam band
- Length: 203:01
- Label: Rhino
- Producers: David Lemieux, Jeffrey Norman

Grateful Dead chronology
Fillmore West 1969: The Complete Recordings (2005)	Fillmore West 1969 (2005)	Grateful Dead Download Series Volume 8 (2005)

Fillmore West 1969 is a three-CD live album by the rock band the Grateful Dead. It contains selected songs recorded at the Fillmore West in San Francisco on February 27 through March 2, 1969. The album was remixed and remastered from the original 16-track concert soundboard tapes. The album is packaged as a hardcover booklet, with photos of the band and an essay by Dennis McNally.

In addition to the three-disc set, the entire run of four nights was released as The Complete Fillmore West 1969, a 10-CD box set that was limited to 10,000 copies.

Five of the seven songs on Live/Dead (rock's first 16-track live album, released in November 1969) were taken from these shows. Fillmore West 1969 includes highlights that did not appear on Live/Dead, with the exception of "Feedback" and the full-length version of "And We Bid You Good Night", which had appeared in truncated form on that album.

== Critical reception ==
Professional ratings
Review scores
Source	Rating
Allmusic	4/5 stars

On AllMusic Lindsay Planer wrote, "Collectively [the Grateful Dead in 1969] created an incendiary ensemble embracing R&B with the same passion and sense of intrepid experimentation as they did their own unique imprint of sonic psychedelia. And nowhere is that seemingly odd amalgam as evident as it is here.... Three and a half decades later those tapes were revisited and revitalized by longtime Grateful Dead producer Jeffrey Norman."

== Track listing ==
Disc 1
No.	Title	Recording date	Length
1.	"Morning Dew" (Bonnie Dobson, Tim Rose)	February 28, 1969	11:05
2.	"Good Morning Little Schoolgirl" (Sonny Boy Williamson)	February 28, 1969	11:00
3.	"Doin' That Rag" (Jerry Garcia, Robert Hunter)	February 28, 1969	6:56
4.	"I'm a King Bee" (James Moore, arr. by Grateful Dead)	February 28, 1969	7:31
5.	"Cosmic Charlie" (Garcia, Hunter)	February 27, 1969	6:02
6.	"Turn On Your Lovelight" (Joseph Scott, Deadric Malone)	February 28, 1969	19:09

Disc 2
No.	Title	Recording date	Length
1.	"Dupree's Diamond Blues" (Garcia, Hunter)	March 1, 1969	4:48
2.	"Mountains of the Moon" (Garcia, Hunter)	March 1, 1969	4:52
3.	"Dark Star >" (Garcia, Mickey Hart, Bill Kreutzmann, Phil Lesh, Ron "Pigpen" McKernan, Bob Weir, Hunter)	February 28, 1969	19:43
4.	"St. Stephen >" (Garcia, Lesh, Hunter)	February 28, 1969	7:51
5.	"The Eleven >" (Lesh, Hunter)	February 28, 1969	15:13
6.	"Death Don't Have No Mercy" (Reverend Gary Davis)	February 28, 1969	9:48

Disc 3
No.	Title	Recording date	Length
1.	"That's It for the Other One: "Cryptical Envelopment" (Garcia); "The Other One" (Weir, Kreutzmann); "Cryptical Envelopment" (Garcia)"	March 2, 1969	23:30
2.	"Alligator >" (Lesh, McKernan, Hunter)	March 2, 1969	4:00
3.	"Drums >" (Hart, Kreutzmann)	March 2, 1969	6:52
4.	"Jam >" (Grateful Dead)	March 2, 1969	25:31
5.	"Caution (Do Not Stop on Tracks) >" (Grateful Dead)	March 2, 1969	9:13
6.	"Feedback (Note: Previously released on Live/Dead)" (Grateful Dead)	March 2, 1969	7:54
7.	"And We Bid You Goodnight (Note: Previously released in edited form on Live/Dead)" (trad., arr. by Grateful Dead)	March 2, 1969	2:01

== Personnel ==
=== Grateful Dead ===
- Tom Constanten - organ
- Jerry Garcia - lead guitar, vocals
- Mickey Hart - drums
- Bill Kreutzmann - drums
- Phil Lesh - electric bass, vocals
- Ron "Pigpen" McKernan - harmonica, organ, percussion, vocals
- Bob Weir - rhythm guitar, vocals

=== Production ===
- David Lemieux – producer
- Cameron Sears – executive producer
- Bob Matthews – recording engineer
- Betty Cantor – recording engineer
- Jeffrey Norman – mixing, mastering, producer
- Eileen Law – archival research
- Rosie McGee – photography
- Herb Greene – photography
- Michael Merritt – photography
- Baron Wolman – photography
- Peter Simon – photography
- Amalie R. Rothschild – photography
- Suanne C Skidd – photography
- Sylvia Clarke Hamilton – photography
- Richard Biffle – cover lettering
- Brian Connors – art coordination
- Robert Minkin – package design
- Dennis McNally – booklet essay
