= Dick's Picks Volume 22 =

Live album by Grateful Dead
- Released: June 2001
- Recorded: February 23–24, 1968
- Venue: Kings Beach Bowl (Lake Tahoe)
- Genre: Psychedelic rock; Jam band
- Length: 146:53
- Label: Grateful Dead
- Producer: Grateful Dead; Dan Healy

Grateful Dead chronology
Dick's Picks Volume 21 (2001)	Dick's Picks Volume 22 (2001)	View from the Vault II (2001)

Professional ratings
Review scores
Source	Rating
Allmusic	4/5 stars
The Music Box	5/5 stars
Rolling Stone	3/5 stars

Dick's Picks Volume 22 is a two-CD album by the rock group the Grateful Dead, the 22nd installment of the live archival release series. It documents portions of the concerts on February 23 and 24, 1968, at the Kings Beach Bowl in Kings Beach, California (located on the north shore of Lake Tahoe). It was released in June 2001.

Dick's Picks Volume 22 is mastered in HDCD from the original recordings by Dan Healy. The recordings are noted for being part of the live material used to create Anthem of the Sun, the Grateful Dead's second album.

== Enclosure ==
Included with the release is a single sheet folded in half, yielding a four-page enclosure that slides out of the case, enabling its front page to also function as the CD's cover. The back features a white outline of a circular stealie skull superimposed on a mostly blue bird's-eye photographic view of some snow-covered trees.

Inside the enclosure, the page on the left side lists the contents of and credits for the release. The page on the right side features a blue-on-orange publicity poster for the shows. Entitled "Grateful dead morning glory", the poster includes the dates, location, and ticket price for the shows, "$3.00 [in] advance, $3.50 at the door." The center of the poster features a skeleton skiing downhill at night while wearing an orange scarf.

== Caveat emptor ==
Each volume of Dick's Picks has its own "caveat emptor" label, advising the listener of the sound quality of the recording. The one for Volume 22 reads:

"Warning: This is not an audiophile recording! Many of you may have read the numerous Dick's Picks Caveat Emptors over the years and thought "Oh yeah... sure... whatever." Well, this old analog recording source exhibits many audio flaws including high distortion, low vocals, tape hiss, and missing pieces. No fair calling Customer Support and complaining! However, let it be known that this CD also includes some pretty damn exciting and historical music, and for that reason is brought to you with pride."

== Track listing ==
Disc one – February 23

1. "Viola Lee Blues" (Noah Lewis) – 19:16
2. "It Hurts Me Too" (Elmore James) – 4:13
3. "Dark Star" (Robert Hunter, Jerry Garcia, Mickey Hart, Bill Kreutzmann, Phil Lesh, Ron McKernan, Bob Weir) – 6:49 →
4. "China Cat Sunflower" (Hunter, Garcia) – 4:38 →
5. "The Eleven" (Hunter, Lesh) – 10:33 →
6. "Turn On Your Lovelight" (Deadric Malone, Joseph Scott) – 12:40
7. "Born Cross-Eyed" (Weir) – 2:32 →
8. "Spanish Jam" (Grateful Dead) – 7:23

Disc two – February 24

1. "Morning Dew" (Bonnie Dobson, Tim Rose) – 8:10
2. "Good Morning Little Schoolgirl" (Sonny Boy Williamson) – 14:39
3. "That's It for the Other One" – 8:13 →
  - "Cryptical Envelopment" (Garcia)
  - "The Faster We Go, the Rounder We Get" (Weir, Kreutzmann)
  - "Cryptical Envelopment" (Garcia)
4. "New Potato Caboose" (Bobby Petersen, Lesh) – 9:08
5. "Alligator" (Hunter, McKernan, Lesh) – 3:45 →
6. "China Cat Sunflower" (Hunter, Garcia) – 4:14 →
7. "The Eleven" (Hunter, Lesh) – 7:17 →
8. "Alligator" (McKernan, Lesh) – 6:39 →
9. "Caution (Do Not Stop On Tracks)" (Grateful Dead) – 11:49 →
10. "Feedback" (Grateful Dead) – 4:55

== Personnel ==
=== Grateful Dead ===
- Jerry Garcia – lead guitar, vocals
- Phil Lesh – electric bass, vocals
- Bob Weir – rhythm guitar, vocals
- Ron "Pigpen" McKernan – organ, harmonica, percussion, vocals
- Mickey Hart – drums
- Bill Kreutzmann – drums

=== Production ===
- Dan Healy – live recording
- Dick Latvala – tape archivist
- David Lemieux – tape archivist
- Jeffrey Norman – CD mastering
- Eileen Law – archival research
- Tina Carpenter – cover art and design
- Robert Minkin – layout design
- Andy Mond – photos
- Patricia Holmbo – photos
- Brad Perks – photos
- Chris Jepsen – photos
