= Dick's Picks Volume 26 =

Live album by Grateful Dead
- Released: October 1, 2002
- Recorded: April 26–27, 1969
- Genres: Jam; Folk rock Psychedelic rock
- Length: 142:01
- Label: Grateful Dead Records

Grateful Dead chronology
View from the Vault III (2002)	Dick's Picks Volume 26 (2002)	Go to Nassau (2002)

Professional ratings
Review scores
Source	Rating
Allmusic	4/5 stars
The Music Box	4/5 stars
Rolling Stone	4/5 stars

Dick's Picks Volume 26 is the 26th installment of the Grateful Dead's archival series. It was recorded on April 26, 1969, at the Electric Theater in Chicago, Illinois and on April 27, 1969, at the Labor Temple in Minneapolis, Minnesota. It contains a rare cover of the Jimmy Reed song, "I Know It's a Sin".

== Enclosure, liner notes, and article ==
Included in the release is a single sheet of paper, printed on both sides and folded into thirds, yielding a six-page enclosure that slides out of the case. Its front page to also function as the CD's cover, and the back is a mostly blank, textured grey that matches the background of the front.

The first page inside lists the contents of and credits for the release, and the next page inside is filled with liner notes. The third page features a black-and-white photo of the band on stage along with a partial ticket stub for the show at the Labor Temple, and the fourth page features a newspaper article.

=== Liner notes by Bear ===
The liner notes were written by Owsley "Bear" Stanley on 9/22/02. Consisting of only three paragraphs, he starts out by stating that in 1969 the band and crew frequently had to share hotel rooms, "but I think it was one of the nicer things limited money did, because we got to know each other pretty well that way."

The topic of the second paragraph is the Electric Theater in Chicago, which was "one of the odder ones we played in those days." After mentioning that "it was run by Aaron Russo," who later became Bette Midler's manager, he then reveals that "We generally did psychedelics on a Saturday, but I do not remember for sure if that was true this night, but chances are it was."

In the third and last paragraph Bear describes the Minneapolis show as being in the "familiar mode for almost the whole career of the band", in which the group started "off a bit rough around the edges, [would] slowly warm up, and by the second set was flying."

=== Article from the Minneapolis Star Tribune ===
The newspaper clipping included in the enclosure is credited to the Minneapolis Star Tribune, but there is no indication of its date or author. Entitled "Grateful Dead sock it to 2,000 rock lovers," it features two large black-and-white photographs of some fans, including a very young child and a cat, that take up about twice as much space as the article's text.

The article mentions that the Dead was "a group billed as the leader of underground rock" and the young audience "clapped a lot and some of them danced." It closes by describing the music as "a mixture of jazz and rock and folk that—along with the lights and in some cases marijuana—has been turning on people around the country for several years."

== Caveat emptor ==
Each volume of Dick's Picks has its own "caveat emptor" label, advising the listener of the sound quality of the recording. The one for Volume 26 reads:

"Dick's Picks Vol. 26 was mastered directly from the original stereo 7.5 ips analog tapes. It is a snapshot of history, not a modern professional recording, and may therefore exhibit some technical anomalies and the unavoidable effects of the ravages of time".

== Track listing ==
Disc one

1. "Dupree's Diamond Blues" (Jerry Garcia, Robert Hunter) – 4:30 →
2. "Mountains of the Moon" (Garcia, Hunter) – 6:45 →
3. "China Cat Sunflower" (Garcia, Hunter) – 5:58 →
4. "Doin' That Rag" (Garcia, Hunter) – 7:18
5. "Cryptical Envelopment" (Garcia) – 3:05 →
6. "The Other One" (Bob Weir, Bill Kreutzmann) – 7:20 →
7. "The Eleven" (Phil Lesh, Hunter) – 7:59 →
8. "The Other One" (Weir, Kreutzmann) – 1:04 →
9. "I Know It's a Sin" (Jimmy Reed) – 4:28
10. "Turn on Your Lovelight" (Deadric Malone, Joseph Scott) – 20:37 →
11. "Me and My Uncle" (John Phillips) – 4:12 →
12. "Sittin' on Top of the World" (Lonnie Carter, Walter Jacobs) – 3:37

Disc two

1. "Dark Star" (Garcia, Mickey Hart, Kreutzmann, Lesh, Ron "Pigpen" McKernan, Weir, Hunter) – 26:37 →
2. "St. Stephen" (Garcia, Lesh, Hunter) – 9:18 →
3. "The Eleven" (Lesh, Hunter) – 10:19 →
4. "Turn on Your Lovelight" (Malone, Scott) – 15:25
5. "Morning Dew" (Bonnie Dobson, Tim Rose) – 10:47

== Recording dates ==
- April 26, 1969 – Disc 1 tracks 1–9 (an additional track from this date was released on Fallout from the Phil Zone)
- April 27, 1969 – Disc 1 tracks 10–12, Disc 2

== Personnel ==
=== Grateful Dead ===
- Jerry Garcia – guitar, vocals
- Bob Weir – guitar, vocals
- Ron "Pigpen" McKernan – harmonica, percussion, vocals
- Phil Lesh – electric bass, vocals
- Tom Constanten – organ
- Mickey Hart – drums
- Bill Kreutzmann – drums

=== Production ===
- Owsley Stanley – recording engineer
- Jeffrey Norman – CD mastering
- David Lemieux – tape archivist
- Eileen Law – archival research
- Robert Minkin – design and layout
