= Live at the Fillmore East 2-11-69 =

Live album by Grateful Dead
- Released: October 28, 1997
- Recorded: February 11, 1969
- Venue: Fillmore East, New York City
- Genre: Rock
- Length: 2:01:14
- Label: Grateful Dead
- Producer: John Cutler and Phil Lesh

Grateful Dead chronology
Dick's Picks Volume 9 (1997)	Live at the Fillmore East 2-11-69 (1997)	Dick's Picks Volume 10 (1998)

Professional ratings
Review scores
Source	Rating
Allmusic	4/5 stars
The Music Box	4.5/5 stars

Live at the Fillmore East 2-11-69 is a double live album by the Grateful Dead recorded during the Live/Dead tour on February 11, 1969, at the Fillmore East in New York City. The first disc represents the early show that night, the second the late show. The Dead opened for Janis Joplin. This album contains the first Grateful Dead CD release of the Beatles' "Hey Jude".

== Track listing ==
Disc one - early show

1. "Good Morning Little Schoolgirl" (Williamson) – 9:19
2. "Cryptical Envelopment" (Garcia) – 1:55 →
3. "The Other One" (Weir, Kreutzmann) – 6:01 →
4. "Cryptical Envelopment" (Garcia) – 6:58 →
5. "Doin' That Rag" (Garcia, Hunter) – 5:28
6. "I'm a King Bee" (Moore) – 5:19 →
7. "Turn On Your Lovelight" (Joseph Scott, Deadric Malone) – 17:07
8. "Hey Jude" (Lennon, McCartney) – 8:23

Disc two - late show

1. Introduction by Bill Graham – 1:19
2. "Dupree's Diamond Blues" (Garcia, Hunter) – 3:57
3. "Mountains of the Moon" (Garcia, Hunter) – 4:50 →
4. "Dark Star" (Garcia, Kreutzmann, Lesh, McKernan, Weir, Hunter) – 12:29 →
5. "St. Stephen" (Garcia, Lesh, Hunter) – 7:50 →
6. "The Eleven" (Lesh) – 6:09 →
7. "Drums" (Kreutzmann, Hart) – 2:43 →
8. "Caution (Do Not Stop on Tracks)" (Grateful Dead) – 13:26 →
9. "Feedback" (Grateful Dead) – 4:03 →
10. "And We Bid You Goodnight" (traditional) – 9:05

"Cosmic Charlie" (Garcia, Hunter) – Hidden track, tape runs out mid-song

== Personnel ==
Grateful Dead

- Tom Constanten – organ
- Jerry Garcia – lead guitar, vocals
- Mickey Hart – drums
- Bill Kreutzmann – drums
- Phil Lesh – bass guitar, vocals
- Ron "Pigpen" McKernan – percussion, harmonica, vocals
- Bob Weir – rhythm guitar, vocals

Production

- John Cutler – producer, mixing
- Phil Lesh – producer, mixing
- Bob Matthews – engineer, recording
- Dick Latvala – Club Front
- Jeffrey Norman – Club Front
- Gecko Graphics – design
- Amalie R. Rothschild – photography
- Joshua Light Show – light images
- Gary Lambert – CD booklet notes

== Charts ==
Album - Billboard

Year	Chart	Position
1997	The Billboard 200	77
