= Fillmore West 1969: The Complete Recordings =

Live album and box set by Grateful Dead
- Released: November 2005
- Recorded: February 27 – March 2, 1969
- Venue: Fillmore West
- Genres: Psychedelic rock, jam band
- Label: Grateful Dead
- Producers: David Lemieux, Jeffrey Norman

Grateful Dead chronology
Grateful Dead Download Series Volume 7 (2005)	Fillmore West 1969: The Complete Recordings (2005)	Fillmore West 1969 (2005)

Grateful Dead concert box set chronology
So Many Roads (1965–1995) (1999)	Fillmore West 1969: The Complete Recordings (2005)	Winterland 1973: The Complete Recordings (2008)

Fillmore West 1969: The Complete Recordings is a 10-CD live album by the rock band the Grateful Dead. It contains four complete concerts recorded on February 27, February 28, March 1, and March 2, 1969, at the Fillmore West in San Francisco. The album was remixed from the original 16-track concert soundboard tapes. It was released as a box set in November 2005, in a limited edition of 10,000 copies.

Five of the seven songs on the Grateful Dead's 1969 album Live/Dead – the first live rock album recorded in 16-track – were selected from these shows. They are "Dark Star", "St Stephen", "Death Don't Have No Mercy", "Feedback", and "And We Bid You Goodnight". ("The Eleven" and "Turn On Your Lovelight" were recorded about a month earlier at the Avalon Ballroom.)

Fillmore West 1969, released at the same time as Fillmore West 1969: The Complete Recordings, is a three-disc compilation that features highlights of the four nights.

The opening acts at these concerts were Pentangle and the Sir Douglas Quintet.

A bonus disc included with Fillmore East: The Complete Recordings includes selections from two additional Fillmore West shows, June 8, 1969 and February 7, 1970. It also includes a 30-minute version of "Caution (Do Not Stop on Tracks)" that was recorded on June 14, 1968 during the band's debut run of shows at Bill Graham's newly opened Fillmore East in New York City, when the Grateful Dead performed with an opening act of the Jeff Beck Group.

== Critical reception ==
Professional ratings
Review scores
Source	Rating
All About Jazz	5/5 stars
Allmusic	4.5/5 stars
The Music Box	5/5 stars

On AllMusic, Lindsay Planer said, "Few concert runs... are as highly lauded by Grateful Dead enthusiasts as February 27 through March 2, 1969, at the Fillmore West in San Francisco.... At the very heart of what made the Grateful Dead an anomaly in rock & roll was their ability to improvise and interact in order to make each and every experience different from the last, or the next. Over the course of the Fillmore West 1969: The Complete Recordings are nine and a half hours of proof.... Curious parties might find the Fillmore West 1969 three-disc distillation an adequate substitute. However, earnest Deadheads should take whatever measures necessary to obtain this package."

In All About Jazz Doug Collette wrote, "Grateful Dead aficionados as well as dilettantes have equal odds for epiphany working their way through all the sets from this entire four-night run at the fabled rock venue.... There is definite progression apparent on Fillmore West 1969 The Complete Recordings from one night to the next. The band becomes increasingly comfortable as the run goes on, allowing themselves to stretch out in ways it couldn't or wouldn't the first night. It's worth pondering how much early equipment issues affected the group mindset, but a few bum notes and all, this is generally magnificent stuff, the likes of which shakes the ass and the intellect equally roundly."

In The Music Box John Metzger wrote, "Without a doubt, by the time that the concerts featured on Fillmore West 1969 were held, the Grateful Dead had perfected its freewheeling improvisational approach, and nearly everything it touched dripped with the psychedelic transcendence that was forged within the swirling vortex of "Dark Star"'s revolutionary crucible. Arguably, then, the collection contains the most primal music that the band ever unleashed. Although it remained tethered to the R&B-flavored roots favored by harmonica and keyboard player Ron "Pigpen" McKernan, the group had made tremendous strides in pushing the boundaries that defined its music outward in all directions."

== Track listing ==
Disc 1

February 27, 1969 — First set:

1. "Good Morning Little Schoolgirl" (Sonny Boy Williamson) - 11:47
2. "Doin' That Rag" (Robert Hunter, Jerry Garcia) - 7:53
3. "That's It for the Other One" (Garcia, Bill Kreutzmann, Bob Weir) - 20:03 (Note: Previously released on So Many Roads (1965–1995))

Notes

Disc 2

February 27, 1969 — Second set:

1. "Dupree's Diamond Blues" > (Hunter, Garcia) - 3:57
2. "Mountains of the Moon" > (Hunter, Garcia) - 5:57
3. "Dark Star" > (Hunter, Garcia, Mickey Hart, Kreutzmann, Phil Lesh, Pigpen, Weir) - 21:44 (Note: Previously released on Live/Dead)
4. "St. Stephen" > (Hunter, Garcia, Lesh) - 8:22
5. "The Eleven" > (Hunter, Lesh) - 13:03
6. "Turn On Your Lovelight" (Joseph Scott, Deadric Malone) - 19:21

February 27, 1969 — Encore:

7. "Cosmic Charlie" (Hunter, Garcia) - 5:52

Notes

Disc 3

February 28, 1969 — First set:

1. "(Walk Me Out In The) Morning Dew" (Bonnie Dobson, Tim Rose) - 11:04
2. "Good Morning Little School Girl" (Williamson) - 11:00
3. "Doin' That Rag" (Hunter, Garcia) - 6:56
4. "I'm a King Bee" (Slim Harpo) - 7:09
5. "Turn On Your Lovelight" (Scott, Malone) - 19:09

Disc 4

February 28, 1969 — Second set:

1. "That's It for the Other One" > (Garcia, Kreutzmann, Weir) - 19:46
2. "Dark Star" > (Hunter, Garcia, Hart, Kreutzmann, Lesh, Pigpen, Weir) - 19:45
3. "St. Stephen" > (including William Tell Bridge)" (Hunter, Garcia, Lesh) - 7:51
4. "The Eleven" > (Hunter, Lesh) - 15:12
5. "Death Don't Have No Mercy" (Reverend Gary Davis) - 10:38

Disc 5

1. "Alligator" > (Hunter, Pigpen, Lesh) - 4:08
2. "Drums" > (Hart, Kreutzmann) - 4:02
3. "Jam" > (Grateful Dead) - 14:57
4. "Caution (Do Not Stop on Tracks)" > (Grateful Dead) - 8:47
5. "Feedback" > (Grateful Dead) - 5:40
6. "And We Bid You Goodnight" (traditional, arr. Grateful Dead) - 1:08

Disc 6

March 1, 1969 — First set:

1. "That's It for the Other One" > (Garcia, Kreutzmann, Weir) - 21:22
2. "New Potato Caboose" > (Bobby Petersen, Lesh) - 11:43
3. "Doin' That Rag" > (Hunter, Garcia) - 5:58
4. "Cosmic Charlie" (Hunter, Garcia) - 5:51

Disc 7

March 1, 1969 — Second set:

1. "Dupree's Diamond Blues" > (Hunter, Garcia) - 4:48
2. "Mountains of the Moon" > (Hunter, Garcia) - 5:04
3. "Dark Star" > (Hunter, Garcia, Hart, Kreutzmann, Lesh, Pigpen, Weir) - 23:01
4. "St. Stephen" > (Hunter, Garcia, Lesh) - 8:06
5. "The Eleven" > (Hunter, Lesh) - 5:47
6. "Turn On Your Lovelight" (Scott, Malone) - 23:59

March 1, 1969 — Encore:

7. "Hey Jude" (John Lennon, Paul McCartney) - 7:44

Disc 8

March 2, 1969 — First set:

1. "Dark Star" > (Hunter, Garcia, Hart, Kreutzmann, Lesh, Pigpen, Weir) - 21:09
2. "St. Stephen" > (Hunter, Garcia, Lesh) - 8:21
3. "The Eleven" > (Hunter, Lesh) - 12:43
4. "Turn On Your Lovelight" (Scott, Malone) - 15:25

Disc 9

March 2, 1969 — Second set:

1. "Doin' That Rag" (Hunter, Garcia) - 7:38
2. "That's It for the Other One" > (Garcia, Kreutzmann, Weir) - 22:44
3. "Death Don't Have No Mercy" (Davis) - 11:21 (Note: Previously released on Live/Dead)
4. "Morning Dew" (Dobson, Rose) - 10:16

Notes

Disc 10

1. "Alligator" > (Hunter, Pigpen, Lesh) - 4:15
2. "Drums" > (Hart, Kreutzmann) - 6:52
3. "Jam" > (Grateful Dead) - 25:31
4. "Caution (Do Not Stop on Tracks)" > (Grateful Dead) - 9:13
5. "Feedback" > (Grateful Dead) - 7:54 (Note: Previously released on Live/Dead)
6. "And We Bid You Goodnight" (trad., arr. Grateful Dead) - 2:01 (Note: Previously released in edited form on Live/Dead)

Notes

Bonus disc

June 14, 1968 Fillmore East New York, New York

1. "Caution (Do Not Stop on Tracks)" (Grateful Dead) - 30:07

June 8, 1969, Fillmore West:

2. "He Was a Friend of Mine" > (Traditional) - 12:14
3. "China Cat Sunflower" > (Garcia, Hunter) - 4:15
4. "New Potato Caboose" (Lesh, Peterson) - 13:36

February 7, 1970, Fillmore West:

5. "China Cat Sunflower" > (Garcia, Hunter) - 5:29
6. "I Know You Rider" > (Traditional) - 5:08
7. "High Time" (Garcia, Hunter) - 7:04

== Personnel ==
Grateful Dead

- Jerry Garcia - guitar, vocals
- Bob Weir - guitar, vocals
- Tom Constanten - keyboards
- Ron "Pigpen" McKernan - keyboards, vocals, harmonica, percussion
- Phil Lesh - bass guitar, vocals
- Bill Kreutzmann - drums
- Mickey Hart - drums

Production

- David Lemieux – producer
- Cameron Sears – executive producer
- Bob Matthews – recording engineer
- Betty Cantor – recording engineer
- Jeffrey Norman – mixing, mastering, producer
- Eileen Law – archival research
- Rosie McGee – photography
- Herb Greene – photography
- Michael Merritt – photography
- Baron Wolman – photography
- Peter Simon – photography
- Amalie R. Rothschild – photography
- Suanne C Skidd – photography
- Sylvia Clarke Hamilton – photography
- Richard Biffle – cover lettering
- Brian Connors – art coordination
- Robert Minkin – package design
- Dennis McNally – booklet essay
