= Dave's Picks Volume 25 =

Live album by Grateful Dead
- Released: January 26, 2018
- Recorded: November 6, 1977
- Venue: Broome County Arena; Binghamton, New York
- Genre: Rock
- Length: 166:07
- Label: Rhino
- Producer: Grateful Dead

Grateful Dead chronology
Grateful Dead Records Collection (2017)	Dave's Picks Volume 25 (2018)	The Best of the Grateful Dead Live (2018)

Dave's Picks Volume 25 is a three-CD live album by the rock band the Grateful Dead. It contains the complete concert recorded on November 6, 1977, at Broome County Veterans Memorial Arena in Binghamton, New York. It was produced as a limited edition of 18,000 copies, and was released on January 26, 2018.

== Critical reception ==
On AllMusic, Timothy Monger said, "The 25th volume of the long-running archival Grateful Dead series Dave's Picks marks the first official release of an oft-bootlegged show from the waning days of 1977.... The energy remains high throughout both sets, which include sprightly takes on favorites like "Jack Straw", "The Music Never Stopped", and other standards from that era's repertoire."

In Glide Magazine, Doug Collette wrote, "Binghamton, NY 11/6/77 is yet another cull from the treasure trove from whence came Cornell May 1977, a remarkably true-to-life recording by Betty Cantor-Jackson that finds the band on the proverbial fire during a show spreading throughout the three CDs of which it's comprised.... The compulsion is so great to sit down and listen ever so closely, to the exclusion of any other sensory input."

== Track listing ==
Disc 1

First set:

1. "Mississippi Half-Step Uptown Toodeloo" (Jerry Garcia, Robert Hunter) – 12:22
2. "Jack Straw" (Bob Weir, Hunter) – 7:18
3. "Tennessee Jed" (Garcia, Hunter) – 9:24
4. "Mexicali Blues" > (Weir, John Perry Barlow) – 3:19
5. "Me and My Uncle" (John Phillips) – 3:30
6. "Friend of the Devil" (Garcia, Hunter) – 9:38
7. "New Minglewood Blues" (traditional, arranged by Grateful Dead) – 5:34
8. "Dupree's Diamond Blues" (Garcia, Hunter) – 6:11
9. "Passenger" (Phil Lesh, Peter Monk) – 4:43
10. "Dire Wolf" (Garcia, Hunter) – 5:18
11. "The Music Never Stopped" (Weir, Barlow) – 8:05

Disc 2

Second set:

1. "Samson and Delilah" (traditional, arranged by Grateful Dead) – 9:10
2. "Sunrise" (Donna Jean Godchaux) – 4:45
3. "Scarlet Begonias" > (Garcia, Hunter) – 10:46
4. "Fire on the Mountain" > (Mickey Hart, Hunter) – 9:36
5. "Good Lovin'" (Rudy Clark, Artie Resnick) – 7:09

Disc 3

1. "St. Stephen" > (Garcia, Lesh, Hunter) – 7:55
2. "Drums" > (Hart, Bill Kreutzmann) – 2:48
3. "Not Fade Away" > (Buddy Holly, Norman Petty) – 9:44
4. "Wharf Rat" > (Garcia, Hunter) – 11:09
5. "St. Stephen" > (Garcia, Lesh, Hunter) – 1:04
6. "Truckin'" (Garcia, Weir, Lesh, Hunter) – 11:32

Encore:

7. "Johnny B. Goode" (Chuck Berry) – 5:09

== Personnel ==
Grateful Dead

- Jerry Garcia – guitar, vocals
- Donna Jean Godchaux – vocals
- Keith Godchaux – keyboards
- Mickey Hart – drums
- Bill Kreutzmann – drums
- Phil Lesh – bass, vocals
- Bob Weir – guitar, vocals

Production

- Produced by Grateful Dead
- Produced for release by David Lemieux
- Mastering: Jeffrey Norman
- Recording: Betty Cantor-Jackson
- Art direction, design: Steve Vance
- Cover art: Tim McDonagh
- Photos: Bob Minkin
- Liner notes: Rob Bleetstein, David Lemieux
- Executive producer: Mark Pinkus
- Associate producers: Doran Tyson, Ivette Ramos
- Tape research: Michael Wesley Johnson
- Tapes provided through the assistance of ABCD Enterprises, LLC

== Charts ==
Chart (2018)	Peak position
US Billboard 200	27

== See also ==
- Dick's Picks Volume 34 - Features the entire show from the night before on November 5, 1977, as well as selections from November 2 during the same stretch of shows.
