= Dave's Picks Volume 26 =

Live album by Grateful Dead
- Released: April 27, 2018
- Recorded: November 17, 1971; December 14, 1971
- Venue: Albuquerque Civic Auditorium (Albuquerque, New Mexico); Hill Auditorium (Ann Arbor, Michigan)
- Genre: Rock
- Length: 223:26 (Bonus disc 79:00)
- Label: Rhino
- Producer: Grateful Dead

Grateful Dead chronology
Fillmore West 1969: February 27th (2018)	Dave's Picks Volume 26 (2018)	Dave's Picks Volume 27 (2018)

Alternative cover
- Dave's Picks 2018 Bonus Disc

Dave's Picks Volume 26 is a three-CD live album by the rock band the Grateful Dead. It contains the complete concert recorded on November 17, 1971, at the Albuquerque Civic Auditorium in Albuquerque, New Mexico. It also contains bonus tracks recorded on December 14, 1971, at Hill Auditorium in Ann Arbor, Michigan. It was produced as a limited edition of 18,000 copies, and was released on April 27, 2018.

A bonus disc was included with shipments of the album to 2018 Dave's Picks subscribers. This disc contains most of the rest of the songs from the December 14 concert.

== Recording ==
The November 17, 1971 concert was the Dead's first show in New Mexico. Keyboardist Keith Godchaux had joined the band about a month before, while Ron "Pigpen" McKernan was convalescing from the effects of liver disease. Pigpen rejoined the band two weeks before the December 14 concert.

During this period, the opening act at many Grateful Dead concerts, including these two, was the New Riders of the Purple Sage.

== Critical reception ==
On AllMusic, Timothy Monger wrote, "Vol. 26 of the Grateful Dead's long-running Dave's Picks archival series offers not one but two shows from late 1971, an era marked by the arrival of the band's second keyboardist, Keith Godchaux... This era marked the early days of what would be an epic couple of years for the Dead...."

In Glide Magazine, Doug Collette noted that the set lists for the November 17 and December 14 concerts were very similar, but that Pigpen performed only in the second of the two shows. "... the differences are subtle but significant. And they are rooted in the contributions of the fairly new enlistee [Keith] Godchaux as much as [those of Pigpen]. The health issues that would claim the vocalist / harpist / keyboardist's life within two years were incipient at [this] point, but nevertheless precluded the extended rave-ups that in earlier years consumed lengthy intervals of Grateful Dead shows; clocking in between approximately four to seven minutes, Pig's lead vocal spotlights "Mr. Charlie", "Next Time You See Me" and "Big Boss Man" are, like most of the surroundings of 12/14/71 (and its companion piece), economical and to the point."

== Track listing ==
Disc 1

First set:

1. "Truckin'" (Jerry Garcia, Phil Lesh, Bob Weir, Robert Hunter) – 9:39
2. "Sugaree" (Garcia, Hunter) – 7:58
3. "Beat It On Down the Line" (Jesse Fuller) – 3:27
4. "Tennessee Jed" (Garcia, Hunter) – 6:52
5. "El Paso" (Marty Robbins) – 5:10
6. "Big Railroad Blues" (Noah Lewis, arranged by Grateful Dead) – 4:06
7. "Jack Straw" (Weir, Hunter) – 5:12
8. "Deal" (Garcia, Hunter) – 5:20
9. "Playing in the Band" (Weir, Mickey Hart, Hunter) – 6:56
10. "Cumberland Blues" (Garcia, Lesh, Hunter) – 5:41
11. "Me and Bobby McGee" (Kris Kristofferson, Fred Foster) – 6:10
12. "You Win Again" (Hank Williams) – 3:18
13. "Mexicali Blues" (Weir, John Perry Barlow) – 3:24
14. "Casey Jones" (Garcia, Hunter) – 5:46

Disc 2

1. "One More Saturday Night" (Weir) – 4:39

Second set:

2. "Ramble On Rose" (Garcia, Hunter) – 6:52
3. "Sugar Magnolia" (Weir, Hunter) – 7:26
4. "Cryptical Envelopment" > (Garcia) – 1:59
5. "Drums" > (Bill Kreutzmann) – 3:35
6. "The Other One" > (Weir, Kreutzmann) – 10:46
7. "Me and My Uncle" > (John Phillips) – 3:08
8. "The Other One" > (Weir, Kreutzmann) – 9:09
9. "Wharf Rat" (Garcia, Hunter) – 8:34
10. "Not Fade Away" > (Buddy Holly, Norman Petty) – 8:12
11. "Goin' Down the Road Feeling Bad" > (traditional, arranged by Grateful Dead) – 7:44
12. "Not Fade Away" (Holly, Petty) – 3:10

Disc 3

December 14, 1971 Hill Auditorium selections:

1. "Truckin'" (Garcia, Lesh, Weir, Hunter) – 8:49
2. "Sugaree" (Garcia, Hunter) – 7:05
3. "Mr. Charlie" (Ron "Pigpen" McKernan, Hunter) – 4:07
4. "Beat It On Down the Line" (Fuller) – 3:14
5. "Loser" (Garcia, Hunter) – 6:25
6. "Next Time You See Me" (Bill Harvey, Earl Forest) – 4:36
7. "El Paso" (Robbins) – 4:45
8. "Big Railroad Blues" (Lewis, arranged by Grateful Dead) – 4:32
9. "Me and My Uncle" (Phillips) – 3:10
10. "Run Rudolph Run" (Johnny Marks, Marvin Brodie) – 3:28
11. "Big Boss Man" (Al Smith, Luther Dixon) – 6:52
12. "You Win Again" (Williams) – 3:41 (Note: "Stars and Stripes Forever" tuning before "You Win Again")
13. "Not Fade Away" > (Holly, Petty) – 7:47
14. "Goin' Down the Road Feeling Bad" > (traditional, arranged by Grateful Dead) – 7:42
15. "Not Fade Away" (Holly, Petty) – 2:47

Bonus disc

December 14, 1971 Hill Auditorium selections:

1. "Jack Straw" (Weir, Hunter) – 5:07
2. "Tennessee Jed" (Garcia, Hunter) – 7:23
3. "Black Peter" (Garcia, Hunter) – 9:07
4. "Playing in the Band" (Weir, Hart, Hunter) – 7:03
5. "Casey Jones" (Garcia, Hunter) – 6:13
6. "Mexicali Blues" (Weir, Barlow) – 3:34
7. "Cryptical Envelopment" > (Garcia) – 1:55
8. "Drums" > (Kreutzmann) – 3:38
9. "The Other One" > (Weir, Kreutzmann) – 18:32
10. "Wharf Rat" (Garcia, Hunter) – 9:07
11. "Sugar Magnolia" (Weir, Hunter) – 7:20

== Concert set lists ==
The set lists for the two concerts on Dave's Picks Volume 26 and its bonus disc are quite similar. The album contains all of the November 17 show and most of the December 14 show.

November 17, 1971 – Albuquerque Civic Auditorium (without Pigpen):

First set: "Truckin'", "Sugaree", "Beat It On Down the Line", "Tennessee Jed", "El Paso", "Big Railroad Blues", "Jack Straw", "Deal", "Playing in the Band", "Cumberland Blues", "Me and Bobby McGee", "You Win Again", "Mexicali Blues", "Casey Jones", "One More Saturday Night"
Second set: "Ramble On Rose", "Sugar Magnolia", "Cryptical Envelopment", "Drums", "The Other One", "Me and My Uncle", "The Other One", "Wharf Rat", "Not Fade Away", "Goin' Down the Road Feeling Bad", "Not Fade Away"

December 14, 1971 – Hill Auditorium (with Pigpen):

First set: "Truckin'",^{[a]} "Sugaree",^{[a]} "Mr. Charlie",^{[a]} "Beat It On Down the Line",^{[a]} "Loser",^{[a]} "Jack Straw",^{[b]} "Next Time You See Me",^{[a]} "Tennessee Jed",^{[b]} "El Paso",^{[a]} "Big Railroad Blues",^{[a]} "Me and My Uncle",^{[a]} "Run Rudolph Run",^{[a]} "Black Peter",^{[b]} "Playing in the Band",^{[b]} "Casey Jones"^{[b]}
Second set: "Ramble On Rose",^{[c]} "Mexicali Blues",^{[b]} "Big Boss Man",^{[a]} "Cryptical Envelopment",^{[b]} "Drums",^{[b]} "The Other One",^{[b]} "Wharf Rat",^{[b]} "Sugar Magnolia",^{[b]} "You Win Again",^{[a]} "Not Fade Away",^{[a]} "Goin' Down the Road Feeling Bad",^{[a]} "Not Fade Away"^{[a]}

[a] On disc 3
[b] On bonus disc
[c] Not included

== Personnel ==
Grateful Dead

- Jerry Garcia – guitar, vocals
- Keith Godchaux – keyboards
- Bill Kreutzmann – drums
- Phil Lesh – bass, vocals
- Ron "Pigpen" McKernan – organ, harmonica, vocals (disc 3 and bonus disc)
- Bob Weir – guitar, vocals

Production

- Produced by Grateful Dead
- Produced for release by David Lemieux
- Associate Producers: Doran Tyson & Ivette Ramos
- Recording: Rex Jackson
- Mastering: Jeffrey Norman
- Art direction, design: Steve Vance
- Cover art: Tim McDonagh
- Photo: Mary Ann Mayer
- Liner notes: David Lemieux

== Charts ==
Chart (2018)	Peak position
US Billboard 200	26
