= Grateful Dead Records Collection =

Box set by Grateful Dead
- Released: November 24, 2017
- Recorded: 1973 – 1975
- Genre: Rock
- Label: Rhino
- Producer: Grateful Dead

Grateful Dead chronology
Robert F. Kennedy Stadium, Washington, D.C., July 12 & 13, 1989 (2017)	Grateful Dead Records Collection (2017)	Dave's Picks Volume 25 (2018)

Grateful Dead Records Collection is a box set of albums by the rock band the Grateful Dead. It contains four albums on five LPs. The albums were previously released by the band's own record company, Grateful Dead Records. They were remastered for the box set, and pressed on 180-gram vinyl. The albums included in the box set are Wake of the Flood (originally released in 1973), From the Mars Hotel (1974), Blues for Allah (1975), and Steal Your Face (a live double album recorded in 1974 and released in 1976).

Grateful Dead Records Collection was released on November 24, 2017, as part of Record Store Day Black Friday. Subsequently, the box set was made available as a digital download.

== Track listing ==
=== Wake of the Flood ===
Wake of the Flood

Side 1

1. "Mississippi Half-Step Uptown Toodeloo" (Jerry Garcia, Robert Hunter)
2. "Let Me Sing Your Blues Away" (Keith Godchaux, Hunter)
3. "Row Jimmy" (Garcia, Hunter)
4. "Stella Blue" (Garcia, Hunter)

Side 2

1. "Here Comes Sunshine" (Garcia, Hunter)
2. "Eyes of the World" (Garcia, Hunter)
3. "Weather Report Suite"
  - "Prelude" (Bob Weir)
  - "Part I" (Weir, Eric Andersen)
  - "Part II (Let It Grow)" (Weir, John Perry Barlow)

=== From the Mars Hotel ===
From the Mars Hotel

Side 1

1. "U.S. Blues" (Garcia, Hunter)
2. "China Doll" (Garcia, Hunter)
3. "Unbroken Chain" (Phil Lesh, Robert Petersen)
4. "Loose Lucy" (Garcia, Hunter)

Side 2

1. "Scarlet Begonias" (Garcia, Hunter)
2. "Pride of Cucamonga" (Lesh, Petersen)
3. "Money Money" (Weir, Barlow)
4. "Ship of Fools" (Garcia, Hunter)

=== Blues for Allah ===
Blues for Allah

Side 1

1. "Help on the Way" (Garcia, Hunter)
2. "Slipknot!" (Garcia, Godchaux, Bill Kreutzmann, Lesh, Weir)
3. "Franklin's Tower" (Garcia, Kreutzmann, Hunter)
4. "King Solomon's Marbles" (Lesh)
5. "Stronger Than Dirt or Milkin' the Turkey" (Mickey Hart, Kreutzmann, Lesh)
6. "The Music Never Stopped" (Weir, Barlow)

Side 2

1. "Crazy Fingers" (Garcia, Hunter)
2. "Sage & Spirit" (Weir)
3. "Blues for Allah" (Garcia, Hunter)
4. "Sand Castles & Glass Camels" (Garcia, Godchaux, Hart, Kreutzmann, Lesh, Weir)
5. "Unusual Occurrences in the Desert" (Garcia, Hunter)

=== Steal Your Face ===
Steal Your Face

Side 1

1. "Promised Land" (Chuck Berry)
2. "Cold Rain and Snow" (traditional, arranged by Grateful Dead)
3. "Around and Around" (Berry)
4. "Stella Blue" (Garcia, Hunter)

Side 2

1. "Mississippi Half-Step Uptown Toodeloo" (Garcia, Hunter)
2. "Ship of Fools" (Garcia, Hunter)
3. "Beat It On Down the Line" (Jesse Fuller)

Side 3

1. "Big River" (Johnny Cash)
2. "Black-Throated Wind" (Weir, Barlow)
3. "U.S. Blues" (Garcia, Hunter)
4. "El Paso" (Marty Robbins)

Side 4

1. "Sugaree" (Garcia, Hunter)
2. "It Must Have Been the Roses" (Hunter)
3. "Casey Jones" (Garcia, Hunter)

== Personnel ==
Grateful Dead

- Jerry Garcia – guitar, vocals
- Donna Jean Godchaux – vocals
- Keith Godchaux – keyboards
- Mickey Hart – drums on Blues for Allah and on "Promised Land" from Steal Your Face
- Bill Kreutzmann – drums
- Phil Lesh – bass, vocals
- Bob Weir – guitar, vocals

Box set production

- Produced by Grateful Dead
- Produced for release by David Lemieux
- Mastering: David Glasser
- Lacquer cutting: Chris Bellman
- Plangent Processes wow and flutter reduction: Jamie Howarth
