= Ron "Pigpen" McKernan =

American musician (1945–1973)

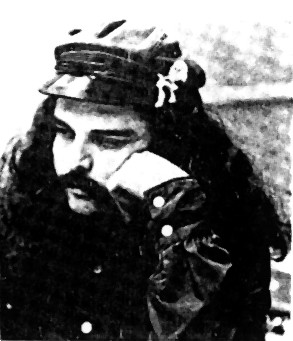
- McKernan in 1968

Background information
- Also known as: Pigpen, Blue Ron
- Born: Ronald Charles McKernan; September 8, 1945; San Bruno, California, U.S.
- Origin: Palo Alto, California, U.S.
- Died: March 8, 1973 (aged 27) Corte Madera, California, U.S.
- Genres: Blues; rock; psychedelia; rhythm and blues; gospel
- Occupations: Musician; singer; songwriter
- Instruments: Keyboards; harmonica; percussion; vocals; guitar
- Years active: 1961–1972
- Label: Warner Bros. Records
- Formerly of: Grateful Dead; Mother McCree's Uptown Jug Champions; The Warlocks

Ronald Charles McKernan (September 8, 1945 – March 8, 1973), known as Pigpen, was an American musician. He was a founding member of the San Francisco band the Grateful Dead and played in the group from 1965 to 1972.

McKernan grew up heavily influenced by African-American music, particularly the blues, and enjoyed listening to his father's collection of records and taught himself how to play harmonica and piano. McKernan began socializing around the San Francisco Bay Area, becoming friends with Jerry Garcia. After the pair had played in various folk and jug bands, McKernan suggested they form an electric group, which became the Grateful Dead. He was the band's original frontman and played harmonica and electric organ, but Garcia and bassist Phil Lesh's influences on the band became increasingly stronger as they embraced psychedelic rock. McKernan struggled to keep up with the changing music, causing the group to hire keyboardist Tom Constanten, with McKernan's contributions essentially limited to vocals, harmonica, and percussion from November 1968 to January 1970. He continued to be a frontman in concert for some numbers, including his interpretations of Bobby Bland's "Turn On Your Love Light" and the Rascals' "Good Lovin'".

Unlike the other members of the Grateful Dead, McKernan avoided psychedelic drugs, preferring to drink alcohol (namely whiskey and flavored fortified wine). By 1971, his health had been affected by alcoholism and liver damage and doctors advised him to stop touring. Following a hiatus, McKernan resumed touring with the group in December 1971, but was forced to retire from touring altogether six months later. He was found dead of a gastrointestinal hemorrhage on March 8, 1973, aged 27, and is buried at Alta Mesa Memorial Park in Palo Alto.

== Biography ==
=== Early life ===
Ronald Charles McKernan was born on September 8, 1945, in San Bruno, California. He came from Irish ancestry, and his father, Phil McKernan, was an R&B and blues disc jockey, who has been reported to have been one of the first white DJs on KDIA (later renamed KMKY), then a black radio station, by several sources. Other sources place him at Berkeley station KRE (later renamed KBLX-FM). Ronald grew up with African American friends and enjoyed black music and culture. As a youth, he taught himself blues piano, guitar and harmonica and developed a biker culture image. McKernan moved to Palo Alto, California, with his family, where he became friends with musician Jerry Garcia at age 14. McKernan built up a substantial collection of old blues 78s from labels such as Kent and Chess.

McKernan began spending time around coffeehouses and music stores, and worked at Dana Morgan's Music Store in Palo Alto with Garcia. One night, Garcia invited McKernan on stage to play harmonica and sing the blues. Garcia was impressed and McKernan became the blues singer in local jam sessions. He was initially nicknamed "Blue Ron" before settling on "Pigpen". Band biographies say that McKernan got the nickname owing to his similarity to Pig-Pen, the permanently-dirty character in the comic-strip Peanuts.

=== Grateful Dead ===
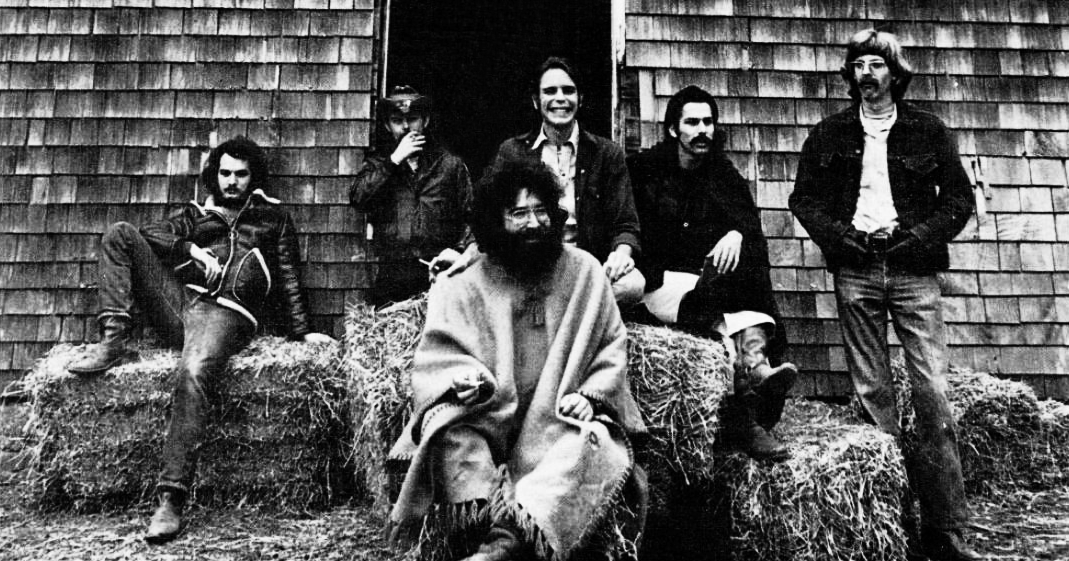
Ron "Pigpen" McKernan (second from left) as part of the Grateful Dead in 1970

Along with Garcia and second guitarist Bob Weir, McKernan was a participant in the predecessor groups leading to the formation of the Grateful Dead, beginning with the Zodiacs and Mother McCree's Uptown Jug Champions. Drummer Bill Kreutzmann was added and the band evolved into the Warlocks. Around 1965, McKernan urged the rest of the Warlocks to switch to electric instruments. Bassist Phil Lesh joined soon after, and they became the Grateful Dead. The group was keen to involve McKernan in the band, as he was the group's original leader and was considered the best singer and frontman.

The Dead's early sets centered around blues and R&B songs chosen by McKernan. By the end of 1966, Garcia had improved his musical skills, changing the band's direction and reducing McKernan's contributions. In 1967, drummer Mickey Hart joined the Grateful Dead, followed by classically trained keyboardist Tom Constanten the following year, further changing the group's style. Constanten often replaced McKernan on keyboards in the studio, as McKernan found it difficult to adapt to the new material that Garcia and Lesh composed for the band.

In October 1968, McKernan and Weir were nearly fired from the band after Garcia and Lesh believed their playing was holding the band back from lengthy and experimental jamming. Garcia delegated the task of firing them to Rock Scully, who said that McKernan "took it hard." Weir promised to improve, but McKernan was more stubborn. According to Garcia biographer Blair Jackson, McKernan missed three Dead shows before vowing not to "be lazy" any more and rejoining, while Kreutzmann objected to replacing McKernan and said the event never happened. Following his discharge from the United States Air Force in November 1968, Constanten officially joined the band, having only worked in the studio while on leave up to that point. Road manager Jon McIntire commented that "Pigpen was relegated to the congas at that point and it was really humiliating and he was really hurt, but he couldn't show it, couldn't talk about it." He began to take Hammond organ lessons and learned how to use the various drawbars and controls.

After Constanten's departure in January 1970 over musical and lifestyle differences, McKernan nominally resumed keyboard duties. He played an instrument on two tracks only (Hammond organ on "Black Peter" and harmonica on "Easy Wind", on which he also sang lead) on Workingman's Dead (1970), the band's breakthrough studio release. On the follow-up album American Beauty, keyboard parts were handled by Garcia and Lesh, along with session musicians Howard Wales and Ned Lagin. The 1971 live album Grateful Dead featured three overdubbed organ parts from Merl Saunders in addition to McKernan's contributions on "Big Railroad Blues", "The Other One", and "Me & Bobby McGee". While Garcia expressed frustration at McKernan's missed rehearsals and his inability to keep up with new material, Lesh was more forgiving, maintaining that "it was okay for Pigpen to lay out ... we kept wanting Pigpen to be there because he was 'one of us.' "

== Musical style and influences ==
While in the Grateful Dead, McKernan sang and played blues-influenced organ and harmonica. He initially played a Lowrey T1 (often confused for a Farfisa combo organ) before switching to the more elaborate Vox Continental in 1966. McKernan began to alternate between the Vox Continental and the Hammond B-3 in June 1967, usually reserving the former instrument for outdoor and impromptu concerts, including the band's performance at the Columbia University protests of 1968. During Tom Constanten's tenure with the group, McKernan occasionally played his bandmate's double-manual Vox Super Continental on some songs (most notably "Death Don't Have No Mercy") through May 1969. With the exception of select acoustic sets in 1970 in which McKernan played upright piano, he used the Hammond exclusively thereafter.

McKernan sang lead on several standards he wanted the Dead to record, such as Otis Redding's "Pain in My Heart" and Wilson Pickett's "In the Midnight Hour", with the latter serving as one of the band's main improvisatory vehicles from 1966 to 1968. Unlike fellow vocalists Garcia and Weir, McKernan sang lead without playing any instrument except harmonica and actively interacted with the audience, occasionally walking out into the crowd. During the band's first year when they played straightforward blues, he performed the majority of lead vocals, attracting an early audience that came specifically to see him sing and play harmonica. McKernan took on early management duties in the band, ensuring they would be paid and promoted properly for gigs.

Though McKernan's garage rock and blues-influenced style was appropriate for their early recordings, it was less suited to the group's later shift to psychedelic and improvised music. He went from contributing to every song and singing lead on all of side two of 1968's Anthem of the Sun to little more than sporadic appearances on the following year's Aoxomoxoa. McKernan continued to front the band for long stretches during their live performances and suggested new material for the Dead's concert repertoire, including Redding's "Hard to Handle" and James Brown's "It's a Man's Man's Man's World".

McKernan achieved a new prominence in 1969 singing "Turn On Your Love Light"; initially introduced in 1967, the song gradually evolved into the band's show-stopping finale, often extending to 15 to 30 minutes. He improvised lyrics over the band's accompaniment, using phrases he had heard from African American friends, such as "rider" (slang for "lover"), "she's got box-back nitties" (referring to female underwear) and "boar hog's eye" (reference to female anatomy). When the Grateful Dead appeared at Woodstock, the band's set (which was marred by technical problems and general chaos and described as one of their worst shows) ended with "Turn On Your Love Light". Even as his instrumental contributions waned, McKernan's vocal performances remained an integral part of the band's live set; by early 1971, their cover of the Rascals' "Good Lovin'" (initially performed by the group as early as 1966 and featured at shows at the Fillmore East later released as Ladies and Gentlemen... the Grateful Dead) began to emerge as a secondary showcase of his improvisatory talents alongside "Love Light".

McKernan was not a prolific songwriter, preferring to concentrate on blues covers and improvised lyrics. He composed the infrequently performed "Operator" for 1970's American Beauty. Several new songs emerged from a creatively fecund period coinciding with his health problems in 1971, most notably "Mr. Charlie", a collaboration with Dead lyricist Robert Hunter. The song appeared on the live album Europe '72, his last with the group.

Tony Sclafani has compared McKernan's role in the band, initially strong and pivotal but gradually declining, to that of Brian Jones in the Rolling Stones, particularly since both men were primarily influenced by the blues over rock 'n' roll and died aged 27. In contrast, though, McKernan was always encouraged to sing material live and left the group due to ill health, while Jones was fired due to unreliability.

After McKernan's death, a number of recordings were found in his apartment, which have appeared as the bootleg recording The Apartment Tapes. This included two songs recorded in 1964 with future Jefferson Airplane guitarist Jorma Kaukonen. On the bootleg, McKernan played acoustic guitar and piano, instruments he seldom used with the Dead.

== Personal life ==
McKernan was close friends with American singer-songwriter Janis Joplin due to common musical influences and lifestyles, particularly a shared love of alcohol in preference to other drugs; a poster from the early 1970s showed them together at 710 Ashbury Street, the Grateful Dead's communal home from 1966 to 1968. Joplin joined McKernan on stage at the Fillmore West on June 7, 1969, with the Grateful Dead to sing his signature "Turn On Your Love Light", reprising this duet on July 16, 1970, at the Euphoria Ballroom in San Rafael, California. (Note: By co-incidence, both died at the age of 27—Joplin died of a heroin overdose in October 1970.)

McKernan developed a close friendship with fellow keyboardist Tom Constanten based on their mutual aversion to psychedelics and eventually served as best man at Constanten's first wedding. It has been alleged that while his bandmates and friends were using cannabis, LSD, and other hallucinogenic drugs, McKernan preferred alcoholic beverages such as Thunderbird and Southern Comfort. Ironically, McKernan, along with bandmate Bob Weir, was arrested and fined on November 9, 1967 following the cannabis bust which occurred a month earlier on October 2, 1967 at the band's 710 Ashbury Street communal home, even though it was claimed that he did not use the drug. McKernan and Weir would be the only members of the Grateful Dead who were arrested during this raid, with the others who were arrested just being regarded as friends of theirs. The event was covered in the first issue of Rolling Stone, where the reporter noted McKernan had a substantial rifle collection and McKernan's picture appeared on a contemporary report in the San Francisco Chronicle. Because neither took illegal drugs, McKernan and Constanten were the only members of the band not arrested in the January 31, 1970, police raid that inspired the lyrics of the band's song "Truckin'".

In the early years of the Grateful Dead, McKernan was easily recognisable by his biker image, making him a minor celebrity. In 1969, the band's record company, Warner Bros., ran a "Pigpen Look-Alike Contest".

== Health and death ==
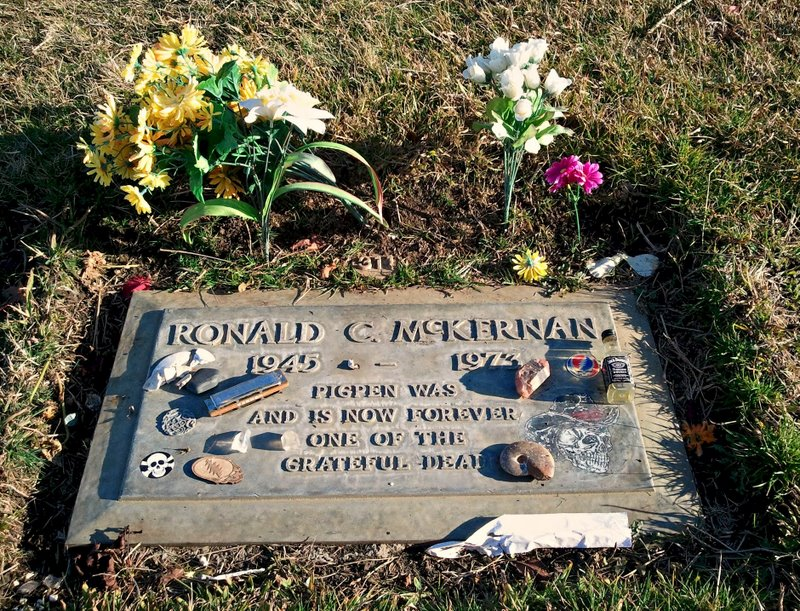
McKernan's headstone in Alta Mesa Memorial Park. The inscription reads "Pigpen was and is now forever one of the Grateful Dead".

McKernan's alcohol abuse had begun to affect his health by his mid-20s. By the early 1970s, McKernan also began to experience symptoms of primary biliary cholangitis, an autoimmune disease that was unrelated to his use of alcohol. After being hospitalized in August 1971, doctors requested that he stop touring indefinitely. Pianist Keith Godchaux was subsequently hired and remained a regular member of the Grateful Dead until 1979. McKernan rejoined the band in December 1971 to supplement Godchaux on harmonica, percussion, and organ. Although manager Rock Scully alleged that McKernan passed out in front of his Hammond organ at one show during this period, Garcia biographer Blair Jackson has lauded the quality and frequency of his instrumental contributions on the Europe '72 tour. However, McKernan's health deteriorated once again to the point where he could no longer perform. On June 17, 1972, at the Hollywood Bowl, McKernan made his final concert appearance. He subsequently broke off all personal relationships with the band, explaining: "I don't want you around when I die."

While Jackson has asserted that McKernan "didn't drink for the last 17 months of his life" in conjunction with an effort to ameliorate his health issues, Grateful Dead tour manager Sam Cutler later maintained that he "[made] sure [McKernan] had booze" on the Europe '72 tour. According to David Browne, McKernan "[lived] on sunflower seeds and alcohol" in the final months of his life.

On March 8, 1973, aged 27, McKernan was found dead of a gastrointestinal hemorrhage at his home in Corte Madera, California, by his landlady. Though McKernan's contributions to the band had slowly diminished over the years, the other members were devastated at his death. McKernan was buried at the Alta Mesa Memorial Park in Palo Alto, California. (Note: Plot: Hillview Section 16 Lot 374) Garcia spoke at his funeral, saying: "After Pigpen's death we all knew this was the end of the original Grateful Dead".

== Legacy ==
Despite his outward image, friends and band biographers have described McKernan as quiet, kind, and introspective. Hart later said, "Pigpen was the musician in the Grateful Dead." Kreutzmann said McKernan was "the sweetest guy anybody had ever met."

Weir later became influenced by McKernan's ability to work a crowd and improvise lyrics. He took over de facto frontman duties in concert and began to reintroduce material originally chosen by McKernan into the Dead's live set after his death. Weir began singing "Good Lovin'" with the Dead in 1974, and the group recorded the song on 1978's Shakedown Street. "Turn On Your Love Light" was revived in 1981, with Weir singing lead. He also revived the 1960s standard "Big Boy Pete", originally sung by McKernan, as a one-off in 1985. Jimmy Reed's "Big Boss Man", recorded by the group on Grateful Dead (Skull and Roses) with McKernan singing lead, was revived by Garcia and performed occasionally through the 1980s and 90s.

"He's Gone", originally appearing on the live album Europe '72, subsequently became a eulogy to McKernan by his former bandmates. Hunter said "it became an anthem for Pigpen".

McKernan was posthumously inducted into the Rock and Roll Hall of Fame in 1994.

== Discography ==
- The Grateful Dead (1967)
- Anthem of the Sun (1968)
- Aoxomoxoa (1969)
- Live/Dead (1969)
- Workingman's Dead (1970)
- American Beauty (1970)
- Grateful Dead (1971)
- Europe '72 (1972)
- History of the Grateful Dead, Volume One (Bear's Choice) (1973)
- Two from the Vault (1992)
- Grayfolded (1994)
- Hundred Year Hall (1995)
- Dick's Picks Volume 4 (1996)
- Dick's Picks Volume 8 (1997)
- Live at the Fillmore East 2-11-69 (1997)
- Fallout from the Phil Zone (1997)
- So Many Roads (1965–1995) (1999)
- So Many Roads (1965–1995) Sampler (1999)
- Dick's Picks Volume 16 (2000)
- Ladies and Gentlemen... the Grateful Dead (2000)
- Dick's Picks Volume 22 (2001)
- Steppin' Out with the Grateful Dead: England '72 (2002)
- Dick's Picks Volume 26 (2002)
- Dick's Picks Volume 30 (2003)
- Birth of the Dead (2003)
- Rockin' the Rhein with the Grateful Dead (2004)
- Rare Cuts and Oddities 1966 (2005)
- Dick's Picks Volume 35 (2005)
- Grateful Dead Download Series Volume 6 (2005)
- Fillmore West 1969: The Complete Recordings (2005)
- Fillmore West 1969 (2005)
- Three from the Vault (2007)
- Road Trips Volume 1 Number 3 (2008)
- Road Trips Volume 2 Number 2 (2009)
- Road Trips Volume 3 Number 3 (2010)
- Road Trips Volume 4 Number 1 (2010)
- Europe '72: The Complete Recordings (2011)
- Europe '72 Volume 2 (2011)
- Winterland: May 30th 1971 (2012)
- Dave's Picks Volume 6 (2013)
- Family Dog at the Great Highway, San Francisco, CA 4/18/70 (2013)
- Dave's Picks Volume 10 (2014)
- 30 Trips Around the Sun: The Definitive Live Story 1965–1995 (2015)
- 30 Trips Around the Sun (2015)
- Shrine Exposition Hall, Los Angeles, CA 11/10/1967 (2016)
- Dave's Picks Volume 19 (2016)
- Dave's Picks Volume 22 (2017)
- Fillmore West 1969: February 27th (2018)
- Dave's Picks Volume 26 (2018)
- Dave's Picks Volume 30 (2019)
- Fillmore West 1969: February 28th (2019)
- Grateful Dead Origins (2021)
- Fox Theatre, St. Louis, MO 12-10-71 (2021)
- Listen to the River: St. Louis '71 '72 '73 (2021)
- Fillmore West 1969: March 1st (2022)
- Lyceum '72: The Complete Recordings (2022)
- Lyceum Theatre, London, England 5/26/72 (2022)
- Dave's Picks Volume 43 (2022)
- Dave's Picks Volume 48 (2023)
- Fillmore West 1969: March 2nd (2023)
- Dave's Picks Volume 51 (2024)
- Enjoying the Ride (2025)
- The Music Never Stopped (2025)
- Fillmore Auditorium, San Francisco, CA, July 3, 1966 (2026)

== General sources ==
- Conners, Peter (2013). JAMerica: The History of the Jam Band and Festival Scene. Da Capo Press. ISBN 978-0-306-82066-3.
- Hollow, Michele (2009). Grateful Dead: What a Long, Strange Trip It's Been. Enslow. ISBN 978-0-766-03028-2.
- Jackson, Blair (1999). Garcia: An American Life. Penguin Books. ISBN 978-0-140-29199-5.
- Kreutzmann, Bill; Eisen, Benjy (2015). Deal: My Three Decades of Drumming, Dreams, and Drugs with the Grateful Dead. St. Martin's Press. ISBN 978-1-250-03380-2.
- Lavezzoli, Peter (2006). The Dawn of Indian Music in the West. A&C Black. ISBN 978-0-826-41815-9.
- Malvinni, David (2013). Grateful Dead and the Art of Rock Improvisation. Rowman & Littlefield. ISBN 978-0-810-88255-3.
- Perone, James (2005). Woodstock: An Encyclopedia of the Music and Art Fair. Greenwood. ISBN 978-0-313-33057-5.
- Room, Adrian (2010). Dictionary of Pseudonyms: 13,000 Assumed Names and Their Origins, 5th ed. McFarland. ISBN 978-0-786-45763-2.
- Sclafani, Tony (2013). The Grateful Dead FAQ: All That's Left to Know About the Greatest Jam Band in History. Hal Leonard. ISBN 978-1-617-13582-8.
- Scully, Rock (2001). Living with the Dead: Twenty Years on the Bus with Garcia and the Grateful Dead. Cooper Square Press. ISBN 978-1-461-66113-9.
- Sounes, Howard (2013). 27: A History of the 27 Club through the Lives of Brian Jones, Jimi Hendrix, Janis Joplin, Jim Morrison, Kurt Cobain, and Amy Winehouse. Da Capo Press. ISBN 978-0-306-82169-1.
- Stanton, Scott (2003). The Tombstone Tourist: Musicians. Simon and Schuster. ISBN 978-0-743-46330-0.
- Trager, Oliver (1997). The American Book of the Dead. Simon and Schuster. ISBN 978-0-684-81402-5.
