= Tom Constanten =

American keyboardist (born 1944)

- Born: March 19, 1944 (age 82); Long Branch, New Jersey, U.S.
- Origin: San Francisco, California, U.S.
- Genres: Rock, psychedelia, classical
- Occupation: Keyboardist
- Years active: 1960s–present
- Formerly of: Grateful Dead
- Website: tomconstanten.com

Tom Constanten (born March 19, 1944) is an American keyboardist, best known for playing with the Grateful Dead from 1968 to 1970, for which he was inducted into the Rock and Roll Hall of Fame in 1994.

== Biography ==
=== Early career ===
Born in Long Branch, New Jersey, and known among friends and colleagues as T.C., Tom Constanten wrote orchestral pieces as a teenager while growing up in Las Vegas, Nevada. He briefly studied astronomy and music at the University of California, Berkeley, where he met future Grateful Dead bassist Phil Lesh in the summer of 1961. The two became roommates and dropped out; shortly thereafter, they enrolled in a graduate-level course taught by Italian modernist composer Luciano Berio at nearby Mills College. Constanten also studied piano with Mario Feninger. In 1962, he lived in Brussels and Paris, met Umberto Eco, and studied on a scholarship with members of the Darmstadt School, including Berio, Henri Pousseur, Karlheinz Stockhausen and Pierre Boulez.

After briefly rooming with Lesh in Las Vegas and returning to the San Francisco Bay Area, Constanten performed with an improvisational quintet formed by Steve Reich. The group's unusual style was influenced by both jazz and Stockhausen. In a 1964 performance, the ensemble played serialism-influenced compositions by both Constanten and Lesh. Although he walked out from the performance, minimalist composer Terry Riley later allowed the ensemble to premiere In C. However, only Reich and one other member of the group, saxophonist-composer Jon Gibson, appeared in the performance.

=== US Air Force service ===
Faced with the possibility of the draft amid the escalation of the Vietnam War, Constanten preemptively enlisted in the United States Air Force in 1965 as a computer programmer. Although the Air Force was deployed in southeast Asia, he was not given a security clearance after divulging his past communist sympathies and remained stationed domestically at Nellis Air Force Base near Las Vegas; while on leave, he used LSD and composed music on military mainframe computers, including the IBM 1401. By 1967, he had been promoted to sergeant. During this period, he first collaborated with the Grateful Dead as a session musician on Anthem of the Sun (1968); Constanten used several compensatory three-day passes to travel to Los Angeles to record with the band.

=== Tenure in the Grateful Dead ===
After sitting in with the band during live performances as his schedule permitted, the day after an honorable discharge, Constanten made his stage debut with the Dead as their permanent keyboardist on November 23, 1968, at the Memorial Auditorium in Athens, Ohio. He later remarked that "it was a case of being an Air Force sergeant one day and a rock & roll star the next." He remained with the group for three albums and left by mutual agreement after the band's infamous New Orleans drug bust following a January 30, 1970, show at the Warehouse. "It was like a magic carpet ride that was there for me to step on," he says. "I would have been a fool not to." Although Constanten nominally replaced founding keyboardist Ron "Pigpen" McKernan, the latter musician stayed on with the band as a frontman-percussionist; in light of their mutual abstinence from psychedelics, they became "as close as two heterosexual males could be," shared a house in Novato, California, and bunked together while touring.

While he had successfully contributed to their complex experimental music, his instrumental style was then grounded in classical technique and bore little consanguinity with the folk, blues, and country and western stylings that would largely anchor the band's oeuvre throughout the early 1970s. Although he performed with a full panoply of keyboard instruments (including piano and harpsichord) on 1969's Aoxomoxoa, Constanten initially played a double-manual Vox Continental II combo organ on stage before switching to McKernan's Hammond B-3 in the spring of 1969; nevertheless, he was dissatisfied with the comparatively dulcet timbres of both instruments vis-à-vis guitarists Jerry Garcia and Bob Weir in a live performance context: "[T]heir sounds ranged from barely acceptable to cringeworthy. For another, I couldn't find a place for the sustained sound of an organ in a guitar band context—ahhh, for a piano! Furthermore, the action of an organ keyboard, electronic or not, was sufficiently different from that of a piano, which was all I'd known until then, to be an obstacle to my getting a feel for the music. Basically, I wasn't an organist. A Merl Saunders or a Melvin Seals could've stepped in... but they weren't there. As if that weren't enough, the amplification technology of the times was much kinder to guitars, with their direct pickups, than it was to pianos. All the electric keyboards available then, you might recall, represented some sort of cheesy compromise with the real thing..."

Several band members and employees felt that he did not fit in with the Dead ethos despite his longstanding friendships with Lesh and Garcia; for example, he was a member of the Church of Scientology throughout his tenure with the band and thus declined to become re-involved with LSD and other drugs. According to band manager Rock Scully, "He was so different. You know, he was like a crew cut. He was like a Marine in a prison camp full of Japanese. He was like our boss in a way. Nobody could go for the hard-wire technology of his brainpower. I was told I was too hard on him, too. But I had no beef."

Echoing Scully's sentiments, drummer Bill Kreutzmann noted in his 2015 memoir that he "got along really well" with Constanten and thought he was "a cool enough guy"; however, he felt that "[Constanten] had this thing where, for whatever reason, he would perform at rehearsals pretty darn well, but then, when we'd be in front of an audience, it was like he froze or something. He couldn't let go... [H]e couldn't trust the music to lead... [I]f you can't do that, you can't be in the band." Although Kreutzmann "felt no animosity" toward Constanten upon his departure, he did not consider him to be a "card-carrying member" of the Grateful Dead. Constanten's last concert as a member of the Dead was on January 31, 1970, at the Warehouse in New Orleans, Louisiana. He played with the band again on April 28, 1971, at the Fillmore East in New York, which was released on Ladies and Gentlemen... the Grateful Dead.

=== Life after the Grateful Dead ===
After leaving the Grateful Dead, Constanten collaborated with Joe McCord, a mime who performed as "Rubber Duck." This culminated in Constanten writing the music for McCord's Tarot, a mime play based on the tarot deck that was performed at the Chelsea Theater Center in Brooklyn, New York, in 1970. Although a proposed Off-Broadway run in Manhattan never occurred, the musicians associated with the project (including Constanten, former Country Joe and the Fish drummer Gary "Chicken" Hirsh and composer Paul Dresher) performed several shows at the Village Gate before relocating to Los Angeles, where they continued to perform as Touchstone, an instrumental rock band. During this period, Constanten worked on a proposed musical version of Frankenstein for Hair producer Michael Butler, who also considered mounting a production of Tarot. Touchstone's debut album (Tarot) was released by United Artists Records in 1972 and contained much of the music intended for the play; however, according to Constanten, "United Artists Records was cool to instrumental bands, though, so they didn't promote the album a whole lot. The fact that the show didn't catch fire during the New York run didn't help. So the second album our contract mentioned (and we had material for) evaporated into the fog on the Hollywood hills."

Shortly thereafter, Constanten held a Creative Associate fellowship in composition at the University at Buffalo's new music-oriented Center of the Creative and Performing Arts during the 1974–1975 academic year. In 1986, he was an artist in residence at Harvard University. He has also taught at the San Francisco Art Institute. From 1986 to 1993, he was the house pianist for the radio program West Coast Weekend, playing solo piano and interstitial music. In 1994, he was inducted into the Rock and Roll Hall of Fame with the Grateful Dead. In 1995 he conducted a short tour as "keyboardist for hire" with Western Massachusetts jam band yeP!, performing with them in the parking lot at the June 15 Grateful Dead concert at Franklin County State Airport in Highgate, Vermont. This was his first time playing Dead-adjacent since he parted ways with them, though he did not interact with the members of the band.

Constanten continues to tour as a solo pianist. He has also played with the reconstituted lineup of Jefferson Starship as a touring member, most notably during the Heroes of Woodstock tour; several of his performances with the group are showcased in the Mick's Picks series of live albums. He has also sat in with a variety of Grateful Dead tribute bands, including Dark Star Orchestra and Terrapin Flyer. In 2015 and 2016 Constanten was a member of Alphonso Johnson's Jazz Is Dead, an instrumental Grateful Dead cover band that interprets classic Dead songs with jazz influences. After meeting Grateful Dead sound engineer Bob Bralove at Jerry Garcia's memorial service, the duo formed Dose Hermanos, a showcase for their improvisational keyboard work; since 1998, they have toured irregularly and released five albums. In 2017, he performed with the Airplane Family & Friends with Live Dead & Riders '69, a band which focuses on the "San Francisco sound" similar to the Dead.

== Philosophy ==
In 2002, Tom Constanten stated in an interview:

I know of no path that is better marked than the study of music. Maybe I just think so because it's the path I'm on. There's the old question "How come there's never enough time to do it right, but there's always enough time to do it over." Well, here's an answer. Settle down. Do it right. However long it takes. That's the direct route to the fast lane!

== Personal life ==
Constanten currently resides in the Oakland area. In 2012, he recovered from a heart attack. On August 16, 2016, Constanten reported on Facebook that he was in the hospital with a broken neck, after slipping and falling on wet cement on August 10, while walking to the post office from his car in a heavy rain.

As of August, 2025, there is a GoFundMe titled "Stand with Greg Martens to Support Tom Constanten", which was set up to help Constanten with medical bills.

== Discography ==
- Anthem of the Sun (1968) – Grateful Dead
- Aoxomoxoa (1969) – Grateful Dead
- Live/Dead (1969) – Grateful Dead
- U (1970) – The Incredible String Band
- Zabriskie Point (1970) – various artists
- Tarot (1972) – Touchstone
- Duino Elegies (1988) – Robert Hunter
- Fresh Tracks in Real Time (1989) – Tom Constanten
- Alternate Versions (1989) – Henry Kaiser
- OutSides (1990) – Tom Constanten
- Heart's Desire (1990) – Henry Kaiser
- Sonatas by Beethoven, Schubert and Haydn (1991) – Tom Constanten
- Hope You Like Our New Direction (1991) – Henry Kaiser
- A Victorian Christmas (1991) – Robin Petrie
- Nightfall of Diamonds (1992) – Tom Constanten
- Morning Dew (1993) – Tom Constanten
- A Victorian Noel (1993) – Robin Petrie
- Eternity Blue (1994) – Henry Kaiser
- Dead Ringers (1994) – Dead Ringers
- Embryonic Journey (1994) – Jorma Kaukonen and Tom Constanten
- Grayfolded (1994) – Grateful Dead
- The Siamese Stepbrothers (1995) – The Siamese Stepbrothers
- Live in Concert at the Piano (1996) – Tom Constanten
- Blues For Allah Project (1996) – Joe Gallant and Illuminati
- Sonic Roar Shock (1997) – Dose Hermanos
- Live at the Fillmore East 2-11-69 (1997) – Grateful Dead
- Fallout from the Phil Zone (1997) – Grateful Dead
- Live from California (1998) – Dose Hermanos
- Shadow of the Invisible Man (DVD, 1999) – Dose Hermanos
- Grateful Dreams (2000) – Tom Constanten
- Search for Intelligent Life (2000) – Dose Hermanos
- Dick's Picks Volume 16 (2000) – Grateful Dead
- 88 Keys to Tomorrow (2002) – Tom Constanten
- Dick's Picks Volume 26 (2002) – Grateful Dead
- Bright Shadows (2004) – Dose Hermanos
- Jan 29, 2004, Charlotte, NC (2004) – Dark Star Orchestra
- The Complete Fillmore West 1969 (2005) – Grateful Dead
- Fillmore West 1969 (2005) – Grateful Dead
- Shimmy Shack (2005) – Shimmy Shack
- For Rex: The Black Tie Dye Ball (2006) – The Zen Tricksters w/ Donna Godchaux, Mickey Hart, Tom Constanten, David Nelson, Michael Falzarano, Rob Barraco
- Moved to Stanleyville (2006) – Tom Constanten and Ken Foust
- Deep Expressions, Longtime Known (2006) – Tom Constanten
- Gram Parsons Archives Vol.1: Live at the Avalon Ballroom 1969 (2007) – The Flying Burrito Brothers
- Dave's Picks Volume 10 (2014) – Grateful Dead
- 30 Trips Around the Sun (2015) – Grateful Dead
- 30 Trips Around the Sun: The Definitive Live Story 1965–1995 (2015) – Grateful Dead
- Fillmore West 1969: February 27th (2018) – Grateful Dead
- Dave's Picks Volume 30 (2019) – Grateful Dead
- Fillmore West 1969: February 28th (2019) – Grateful Dead
- Fillmore West 1969: March 1st (2022) – Grateful Dead
- Dave's Picks Volume 43 (2022) – Grateful Dead
- Enjoying the Ride (2025) – Grateful Dead
- The Music Never Stopped (2025) – Grateful Dead
- Safety in Another Century (2025) – Tom Constanten

== General and cited references ==
- Tom Constanten at AllMusic
- Constanten, Tom (1992). Between Rock and Hard Places: A Musical Autobiodyssey. Hulogosi. ISBN 0-938493-16-7.
- "Tom Constanten interview". Digital Interviews. Rossgita Communication. October 2002. Archived from the original on May 11, 2008.
- Tom Constanten at The Grateful Dead Family Discography
- Jackson, Blair (1999). Garcia: An American Life. New York: Penguin Books. ISBN 0-14-029199-7.
- McNally, Dennis (2002). A Long Strange Trip: The Inside History of the Grateful Dead. New York: Broadway Books. ISBN 0-7679-1186-5.
- Hughes, Andrew S. (July 25, 2009). "Constanten's 'Long, Strage Trip' Continues". South Bend Tribune.
- Prendrergast, Mark (2000). The Ambient Century: From Mahler to Trance – The Evolution of Sound in the Electronic Age. Bloomsbury Publishing. ISBN 1-58234-134-6.
- Tom Constanten collection at the Internet Archive
