= Me and My Uncle =

Song
- Written: 1963
- Genre: Country Rock
- Songwriter: John Phillips

"Me and My Uncle", often also written as "Me & My Uncle," is a song composed by John Phillips of The Mamas and the Papas, and popularized in versions by Judy Collins and the Grateful Dead. It relates the journey of a narrator and his uncle from southern Colorado towards west Texas, involving standard cowboy song themes like a poker game in Santa Fe, accusations of cheating, gunplay, gold, and death.

== Performances ==
John Phillips originally wrote "Me and My Uncle" at a drinking session in a hotel room with Judy Collins, Stephen Stills, and Neil Young among others in 1963. It was first recorded by Judy Collins in 1964 on The Judy Collins Concert.

Casting doubt on the alleged origin, Neil Young and Stephen Stills first met on April 18, 1965 at the Fourth Dimension coffee house in Fort William (now Thunder Bay), Ontario, Canada.

The song was later covered by the Grateful Dead, who adopted it as part of their standard repertoire. It was the single most frequently played song in their live performances, featuring in 616 different shows. Bob Weir is reported to have learned it from James “Curly” Stalarow, a member of the Texas psychedelia scene. The earliest commercially released performance of the song by the Grateful Dead is from the Electric Theater in Chicago, on April 26, 1969, and is available on Dick's Picks Volume 26. One of the earliest performances at the Matrix was recorded on November 29, 1966. The song continued to be performed regularly until Jerry Garcia's death and the end of the band in 1995, and remains a staple of the surviving members' repertoire.

"Me and My Uncle" has been covered by Joni Mitchell, John Denver, Dino Valente, Mike Wilhelm, Widespread Panic, Michael Longcor, John Greene, Billy Strings, Max Creek, Goose (American band) and John Phillips.
