= That's It for the Other One =

Song by Grateful Dead

from the album Anthem of the Sun
- Released: July 18, 1968
- Genre: Psychedelic rock
- Length: 7:40
- Label: Warner Bros.-Seven Arts
- Songwriters: Jerry Garcia; Bill Kreutzmann; Phil Lesh; Ron McKernan; Bob Weir; Tom Constanten
- Producers: Grateful Dead; David Hassinger

"That's It for the Other One" is a song by American band the Grateful Dead. Released on the band's second studio album Anthem of the Sun, it is made up of four sections—"Cryptical Envelopment", "Quadlibet for Tenderfeet", "The Faster We Go, the Rounder We Get", and "We Leave the Castle". Like other tracks on the album, "That's It for the Other One" is a combination of studio and live performances mixed together to create the final product.

While the "We Leave the Castle" portion of the song was never performed live by the band, the first three sections were all featured in concert to differing extents. "Cryptical Envelopment", written and sung by Jerry Garcia, was performed from 1967 to 1971, when it was then dropped aside from a select few performances in 1985. "The Faster We Go, the Rounder We Get", written by Bill Kreutzmann and Bob Weir and sung by Weir, became one of the band's most frequently performed songs in concert (usually denoted as simply "The Other One").

== Music and lyrics ==
=== I. "Cryptical Envelopment" (Garcia) ===
"Cryptical Envelopment" is one of the few Grateful Dead songs with lyrics written by Garcia. It was performed from 1967 to 1971 (when it was then dropped), and brought back for a few performances in 1985. Post-Grateful Dead bands such as Dead & Company have returned to performing the song, sometimes as a standalone track separate from the rest of the suite.

=== II. "Quadlibet for Tenderfeet" (Garcia, Kreutzmann, Lesh, McKernan, Weir) ===
"Quadlibet for Tenderfeet" is a short jam section linking "Cryptical Envelopment" and "The Faster We Go, the Rounder We Get". Transitions between studio and live performances are very audible during this section.

=== III. "The Faster We Go, the Rounder We Get" – also known as "The Other One" (Kreutzmann, Weir) ===
One of the few Grateful Dead songs to have lyrics written by Weir, "The Faster We Go, the Rounder We Get" became one of the Dead's most-played songs (being performed a known 586 times) and most popular vehicles for improvisation, with some performances reaching 30+ minutes in length. The song's lyrics reference the influence of the Merry Pranksters and in particular Neal Cassady. Additionally, the line "the heat came 'round and busted me for smilin' on a cloudy day" refers to a time Weir was arrested for throwing a water balloon at a cop. This section ends with a reprise of "Cryptical Envelopment".

=== IV. "We Leave the Castle" (Constanten) ===
The only Grateful Dead composition written by Tom Constanten, "We Leave the Castle" is an avant-garde piece featuring prepared piano and other studio trickery.

=== "Little Star" (Weir) ===
One of only three Grateful Dead songs written solely by Weir, "Little Star" (also known as "Bob Star") is a short composition that was played three times in 1983. Despite being shelved, it was revived by Weir's band RatDog in 2002. The song shares many musical similarities with "The Other One" and is thought to have been meant as a prelude to the song.

== Reception ==
"That's It for the Other One" (and by extension, "The Other One") has garnered a positive reception and is considered by many one of the band's best tracks. Ultimate Classic Rock placed it at number 8 in their list of the "Top 20 Psychedelic Rock Songs", singling out the studio version as "transcendent". Dig! named it the 12th best Grateful Dead song, calling Weir's lyrics "an early example of the Dead's flair for self-mythology". "The Other One" topped Far Out's list of the 10 best Grateful Dead songs written and sung by Weir, calling it a "legendary psychedelic tale".
