= Live/Dead =

Live album by Grateful Dead
- Released: November 10, 1969
- Recorded: January 26 – March 2, 1969
- Venues: Fillmore West auditorium, Fillmore Street, San Francisco, CA; Avalon Ballroom auditorium, San Francisco, CA
- Genres: Acid rock; psychedelic rock; jam rock
- Length: 75:07
- Label: Warner Bros.-Seven Arts
- Producers: Grateful Dead; Bob Matthews; Betty Cantor

Grateful Dead chronology
Aoxomoxoa (1969)	Live/Dead (1969)	Workingman's Dead (1970)

Live/Dead is the first official live album (and fourth album overall) released by the rock band Grateful Dead. Recorded over a series of concerts in early 1969 and released later the same year, it was the first live rock album to use 16-track recording.

In 2005 the tracks "Dark Star", "St. Stephen", "Death Don't Have No Mercy", "Feedback" and "We Bid You Goodnight" were released, in their original sequence and with a new mix, on the respective February 27, 1969, and March 2, 1969, discs of the Fillmore West 1969: The Complete Recordings box set (the first 1:34 of "Dark Star" can be found on the previous track, "Mountains of the Moon"). "Feedback" and "We Bid You Goodnight" were also released on the triple disc, highlights release Fillmore West 1969.

== Recording ==
To assuage debt accrued with their record label from their recent album Aoxomoxoa, as well as fulfill their record contract, the band decided to record a live album. They were also interested in releasing an album more representative of their live performances and actual musicianship, as opposed to the in-studio experimentation of previous albums. The band's soundman, Owsley "Bear" Stanley, asked electronics designer Ron Wickersham to invent a microphone splitter that fed both into the PA and the record inputs, with no loss in quality. The songs were recorded with an Ampex 16-track machine.

Kreutzmann later explained, "We got our hands on the latest in recording technology — a sixteen-track recorder (which, of course, is antiquated these days) — and we hauled it up the steps of the Avalon, and later the Fillmore West, and we became the first band ever to make a live sixteen-track recording. We weren’t trying to make history; we were just trying to record a live album. ... Studio versions could never do those songs justice, but advances in live recording (some of which were at our own hands) meant that we could bring the live Dead experience to vinyl".

"We're not performers, strictly speaking, and we can't manufacture intensity in a recording studio… we're musicians more than anything else"

— Jerry Garcia

Unlike in later years, in early 1969 the contents of the Dead's set lists varied little. They improvised the medley of "Dark Star"/"St. Stephen"/"The Eleven" several times a week, which enabled them to explore widely within the songs' simple frameworks. The "Dark Star / St. Stephen" pairing was taken from the February 27, 1969 show at the Fillmore West; "The Eleven" and "Turn On Your Love Light" were from the January 26, 1969 show at the Avalon Ballroom; "Death Don't Have No Mercy", "Feedback", and "And We Bid You Goodnight" were recorded March 2, 1969, at the Fillmore West.

Two songs had seen previous release. "St. Stephen" had appeared in a studio version on Aoxomoxoa and "Dark Star" as a single. "The Eleven" was named for its unusual, complex time signature (11/8 time).

== Title and packaging ==
The title has a double meaning. It refers both to the band (the "Dead") playing live, and is an oxymoron, contrasting the two words in apparent contradiction. The artwork, created by Robert Donovan Thomas (aka Bob Thomas), also illustrated this juxtaposition. The word "Live" is seen on the front cover, and the word "Dead" fills the back cover of the gatefold. Additionally, on the back cover, the top portion of "Dead" somewhat cryptically spells out "Acid".

The original Warner Bros. LP [#2WS 1830] included an 8.5" × 11" bi-fold insert with Celtic symbols and lyrics for "Saint Stephen", "The Eleven", and "Dark Star". The tracks are presented as one continuous concert. As such, vinyl copies are pressed with automatic sequencing, for stacking on a record changer (Record One containing sides 1 & 4 and Record Two containing sides 2 & 3). CD versions present the track segues without interruption.

== Release ==
The album was a financial success for the band in the eyes of their label, Warner Bros. Keyboardist Tom Constanten commented that "Warner Bros. had pointed out that they had sunk $100,000-plus (about $820,000-plus adjusted for 2023) into Aoxomoxoa ... so someone had the idea that if we sent them a double live album, three discs for the price of one wouldn't be such a bad deal." It was the final album with Constanten, who left the band in January 1970.

A six-and-a-half-minute edit of "Turn On Your Lovelight" was issued first on the Warner/Reprise Loss Leaders album The Big Ball in 1970, and later on Skeletons from the Closet: The Best of Grateful Dead. A two-and-a-half minute edit of "Dark Star" was released on the soundtrack album for Zabriskie Point, an Antonioni film for which Garcia created additional music. The album's version of "St. Stephen" appears on the 1977 Grateful Dead compilation What a Long Strange Trip It's Been, but fades out during the final verse.

Live/Dead was expanded with hidden bonus tracks as part of the 2001 box set The Golden Road (1965–1973), and has a longer intro on "Dark Star". This version was released separately in 2003.

== Reception and legacy ==
Professional ratings
Review scores
Source	Rating
AllMusic	4.5/5 stars
The Encyclopedia of Popular Music	5/5 stars
The Village Voice	A+

The album was met with very positive reviews, with Village Voice critic Robert Christgau writing that it "contains the finest rock improvisation ever recorded ... Beautifully recorded, too" and Rolling Stone's Lenny Kaye saying it foreshadows "where rock is likely to be in about five years". In his ballot for Jazz & Pop magazine's 1970 critics poll, Christgau ranked Live/Dead as the third best popular music album. (Note: As Christgau explains in the article, "eligible albums were those issued between October 1, 1969 and October 31, 1970.")

In retrospect, AllMusic notes that "few recordings have ever represented the essence of an artist in performance as faithfully as Live/Dead", while Grateful Dead scholar Blair Jackson regards it as the best psychedelic rock album of the 1960s. Engineer and author Michael Hageloh claims that with the album, the Dead "spontaneously create[d] the form now known as 'jam rock'" and became "legends with a generation-spanning cult following". Drummer Bill Kreutzmann comments "It was our first live release and it remains one of our best-loved albums. Its appeal was that it took great 'you-had-to-be-there' live versions of songs like 'Dark Star' and 'The Eleven' and put them right in people’s living rooms."

In 2003, the album was ranked number 244 on Rolling Stone's list of the 500 greatest albums of all time, and 247 in a 2012 revised list. It was voted number 242 in the third edition of Colin Larkin's All Time Top 1000 Albums (2000).

== Track listing ==
Side one
No.	Title	Writer(s)	Lead vocals	Length
1.	"Dark Star"	Jerry Garcia; Robert Hunter	Garcia	23:18

Side two
No.	Title	Writer(s)	Lead vocals	Length
1.	"St. Stephen"	Garcia; Lesh; Hunter	Garcia	6:31
2.	"The Eleven"	Lesh; Hunter	Garcia; Lesh; Weir	9:18

Side three
No.	Title	Writer(s)	Lead vocals	Length
1.	"Turn On Your Love Light"	Deadric Malone; Joseph Scott	McKernan	15:05

Side four
No.	Title	Writer(s)	Lead vocals	Length
1.	"Death Don't Have No Mercy"	Reverend Gary Davis	Garcia	10:28
2.	"Feedback"	McGannahan Skjellyfetti	instrumental	7:49
3.	"And We Bid You Goodnight"	traditional	Garcia; Lesh; Weir	0:35

2001/2003 reissue bonus tracks
No.	Title	Writer(s)	Lead vocals	Length
8.	"Dark Star" (single version)	Garcia; Hunter	Garcia	2:45
9.	"Live/Dead radio promo"			1:01

Notes:

- The four sides of the vinyl album were combined as tracks 1–7 on CD reissues.
- All tracks aside from "The Eleven" and "Turn On Your Lovelight" were later remixed and released with their entire concerts on Fillmore West 1969: The Complete Recordings.

== Recording dates ==
Recording dates
Title	Date
"The Eleven"	January 26, 1969; Avalon Ballroom, San Francisco, CA
"Turn On Your Lovelight	January 26, 1969; Avalon Ballroom, San Francisco, CA
"Dark Star"	February 27, 1969; Fillmore West, San Francisco, CA
"St. Stephen"	February 27, 1969; Fillmore West, San Francisco, CA
"Death Don't Have No Mercy"	March 2, 1969; Fillmore West, San Francisco, CA
"Feedback"	March 2, 1969; Fillmore West, San Francisco, CA
"And We Bid You Goodnight"	March 2, 1969; Fillmore West, San Francisco, CA

== Personnel ==
Grateful Dead

- Jerry Garcia – guitar, vocals
- Bob Weir – guitar, vocals
- Tom Constanten – organ
- Phil Lesh – electric bass, vocals
- Mickey Hart – drums, percussion
- Bill Kreutzmann – drums, percussion
- Ron "Pigpen" McKernan – vocals, congas, organ on "Death Don't Have No Mercy"

Additional Musicians

- Robert Hunter – spoken word on "Dark Star" (single version)

Technical

- Produced by Grateful Dead, Bob Matthews, Betty Cantor
- Executive engineer: Bob Matthews
- Engineer: Betty Cantor
- Consulting engineers: Owsley, Ron Wickersham
- Sound: Bear
- Art direction: Ed Thrasher
- Cover art: R.D. Thomas

== Charts ==
Chart (1969–1970)	Peak position
Canadian RPM 100 Albums	66
US Billboard Top LP's	62
US Cash Box Top 100 Albums	77
US Record World 100 Top LP's	62

== Certifications ==
Region	Certification	Certified units/sales
United States (RIAA)	Gold	500,000^{^}
^{^} Shipments figures based on certification alone.
