= Fillmore West =

Historic live music venue in San Francisco

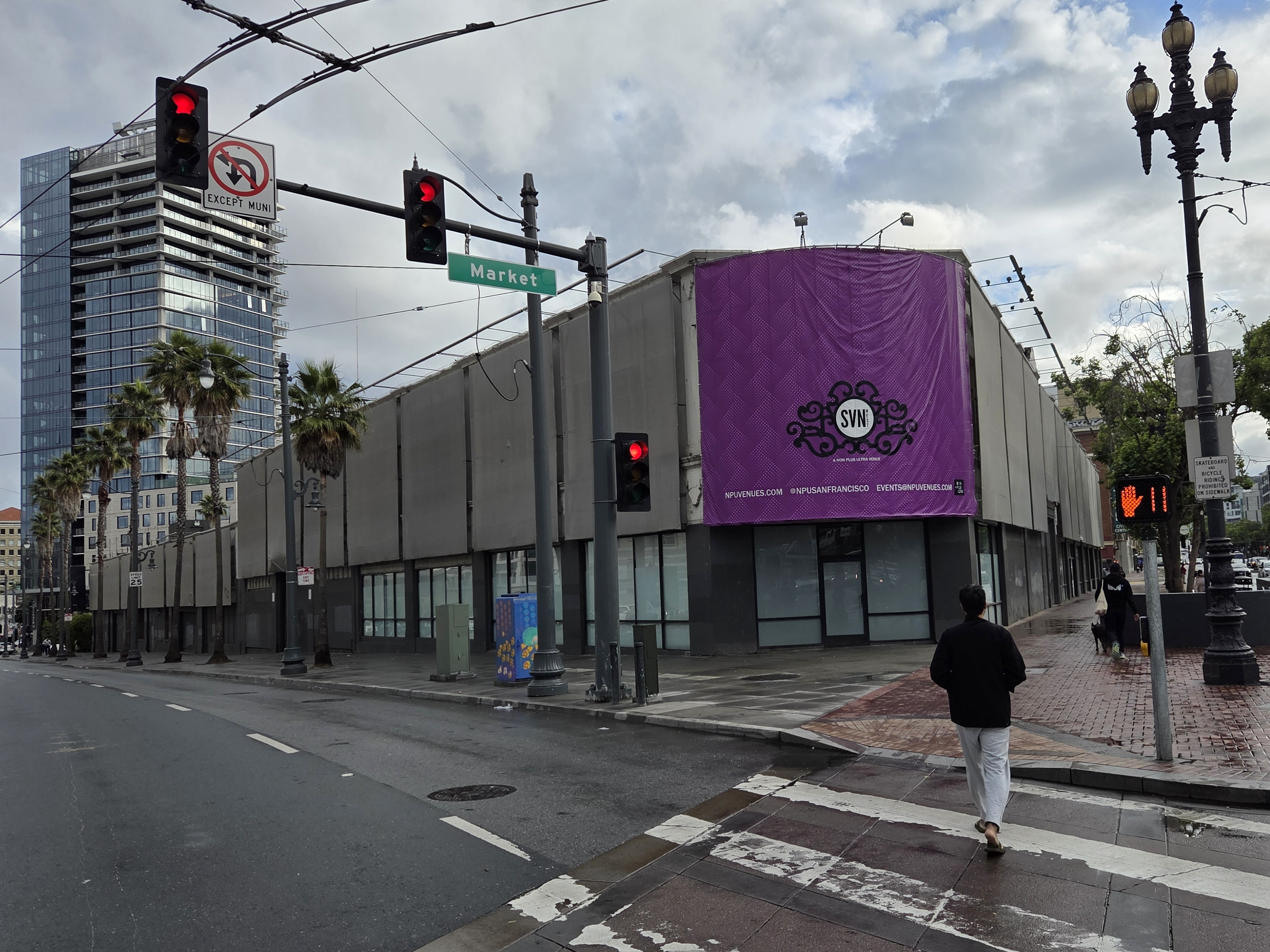
- The building in use as SVN West in April 2026
- Interactive map of Fillmore West
- Former names: The Carousel Ballroom, El Patio
- Address: 10 South Van Ness Avenue
- Location: San Francisco, California
- Coordinates: 37.774742°N 122.419433°W
- Capacity: 3,000

Construction
- Opened: July 5, 1968
- Closed: July 4, 1971

The Fillmore West was a historic live rock and roll music venue in San Francisco, California, US, which became famous under the direction of concert promoter Bill Graham from 1968 to 1971. Named after The Fillmore at the intersection of Fillmore Street and Geary Boulevard (which was Graham's principal venue from 1966 to 1968), it stood at the southwest corner of Market Street and South Van Ness Avenue in the Civic Center district. In June 2018, the top two floors of the building reopened as SVN West, a new concert and corporate event venue.

== History ==
Originally, the El Patio Ballroom, later the Carousel Ballroom, it was a swing-era dance palace, located at 1545 Market street, on the second floor, above the street-level retail at 10 South Van Ness Avenue. Beginning in 1968, it was briefly operated by a collective formed by the Grateful Dead, Jefferson Airplane, Quicksilver Messenger Service and Big Brother and the Holding Company as a social/musical "laboratory experiment". According to critic Joel Selvin, the "six-month run may well have corresponded with the height of the whole '60s Haight-Ashbury/San Francisco thing."

Due to the socioeconomic deterioration of the Fillmore District, the modest capacity of the theatre at 1805 Geary Boulevard, and financial difficulties faced by the collective, rock promoter Bill Graham moved his prime concert location in July 1968 to this larger venue, one and a half miles from the original Fillmore. He called this venue the Fillmore West (in contrast with Graham's Fillmore East auditorium in New York City).

=== Events ===
The Celestial Synapse was a musical event held at the Fillmore West on the evening of 19 February 1969. At least 3,000 people attended the event, hosted by the Frontiers of Science Fellowship. The performance began with a Tibetan Buddhist monk playing Tibetan gongs, and The Grateful Dead played a set. The band was among the regulars at the Fillmore West, playing around eighty concerts (including eighteen when it was still the Carousel Ballroom) from 1968 to 1971.

=== Closing ===
After three years, Graham closed the Fillmore West on July 4, 1971, with five nights of shows featuring such San Francisco bands as Santana, Creedence Clearwater Revival, the Grateful Dead and Quicksilver Messenger Service (who headlined the final performance at the venue) and a poetry reading from Allen Ginsberg. A documentary film of the last several concerts, called Fillmore, and a three-disc album, called Fillmore: The Last Days, were released in 1972.

After housing a Honda car dealership for many years, the venue reverted to a music venue and event space called SVN West. Its first concert, a benefit, was held on June 14, 2018. On March 6, 2025, permits were filed to redevelop the site with a 67-story skyscraper.
