= St. Stephen (song) =

- Japanese single cover, 1969

Single by Grateful Dead

from the album Aoxomoxoa
- A-side: "China Cat Sunflower"
- Released: June 20, 1969
- Recorded: June 1969
- Genre: Psychedelic rock
- Length: 4:26
- Label: Warner Bros.
- Songwriters: Jerry Garcia, Phil Lesh, Robert Hunter
- Producers: Bob Matthews and Betty Cantor

Grateful Dead singles chronology
"Dupree's Diamond Blues" / "Cosmic Charlie" (1969)	"St. Stephen" / "China Cat Sunflower" (1969)	"Uncle John's Band" / "New Speedway Boogie" (1970)

"St. Stephen" is a song by the Grateful Dead, written by Jerry Garcia, Phil Lesh and Robert Hunter and originally released on the 1969 studio album Aoxomoxoa. The same year, a live version of the song was released on Live/Dead, their first concert album. A single of St. Stephen was also released in Japan, where it was paired with "China Cat Sunflower" as its A-side.

Unlike the studio version, live versions usually included a section of the song called the "William Tell Bridge", which was used to segue into "The Eleven". The song was played frequently in live concerts from the late 1960s to the early 1970s.

In August 2026, Rolling Stone ranked this song as the 11th best Grateful Dead song of all time.

The song makes reference to the last days and trial of the 1st century AD saint, St. Stephen, the first martyr of the New Testament of the Bible, who was stoned to death (Acts 7:54-60).
