= Turn On Your Love Light =

Song first recorded by Bobby Bland in 1961

Single by Bobby Bland

from the album Here's the Man!
- B-side: "You're the One (That I Need)"
- Released: 1961
- Recorded: Nashville, Tennessee, 1961
- Genre: Rhythm and blues
- Length: 2:30
- Label: Duke
- Songwriters: Joseph Wade Scott, Deadric Malone a.k.a. Don Robey

Bobby Bland singles chronology
| "Don't Cry No More" (1961) | "Turn On Your Love Light" (1961) | "Ain't That Loving You" (1962) |

"Turn On Your Love Light" is a rhythm and blues song recorded by Bobby Bland in 1961. It was an important R&B and pop chart hit for Bland and has become one of his most identifiable songs. A variety of artists have recorded it, including Them and the Grateful Dead, who made it part of their concert repertoire.

== Composition and recording ==
"Turn On Your Love Light" was written by band leader and arranger Joe Scott (with an additional credit given to Duke Records owner/producer Don Robey aka Deadric Malone). Scott's brass arrangement "upped the excitement ante" with "the groove picking up momentum as the horns and percussion talk to each other" and Bland's vocal "riding on top".

Backing Bland are probably Joe Scott and Melvin Jackson on trumpets, Pluma Davis on trombone, Johnny Board and Jimmy Beck on saxophones, Rayfield Davers on baritone saxophone, Teddy Reynolds on piano, Wayne Bennett on guitar, Hamp Simmons on bass, and John "Jabo" Starks on drums.

== Charts and recognition ==
"Turn On Your Love Light" was one of Bobby Bland's most popular singles. It entered the Billboard R&B chart on December 4, 1961, eventually reaching number two during a stay of fifteen weeks. It was also a Top 40 hit, reaching number 28, one of Bland's highest showings in the pop chart. In 1999, the song received a Grammy Hall of Fame Award and is included in the Rock and Roll Hall of Fame list of the "500 Songs that Shaped Rock and Roll".

== Later renditions ==
In 1964, Van Morrison's band Them often performed "Turn On Your Love Light" live at the Maritime Hotel in Belfast, Northern Ireland. A fan's recording of one of these performances brought Them to the attention of Dick Rowe and led to a recording contract with Decca Records. It is included on their 1966 album, Them Again. Also in 1964, pioneering rock guitar soloist Lonnie Mack released an instrumental version under the title "Lonnie On The Move".

In 1967, "Turn On Your Love Light" became a staple of Grateful Dead concerts, sung by Ron McKernan: a 15-minute rendition is on their 1969 double live album Live/Dead. McKernan's final performance of "Love Light" – complete with extended vocal raps – occurred at the Lyceum Theatre, London, during the Europe '72 tour. Versions with McKernan were often very long due to long vocal raps, instrumental jams, and drum solos throughout. A version performed at the 1969 Woodstock Festival lasted more than 45 minutes. The Grateful Dead later revived the song in the early 1980s with Bob Weir singing, and it has occasionally popped up in later post-Dead group performances. An edited version of the Live/Dead performance (6:30) can be found on pre-2004 releases of Skeletons from the Closet: The Best of Grateful Dead.

In 1966, the song (titled as "Love Lights," and incorrectly credited to the Sonics' bandleader Gerry Roslie) was recorded by the Rascals, appearing as part of a medley with the Motown tune "Mickey's Monkey" on the album Collections. In 1967, the song was released as a single by Jerry Lee Lewis and included on his album Soul My Way (Smash SRS 67097). Lewis's recording was re-released in 1972 as a follow-up to his hit recording of "Chantilly Lace" and appeared briefly in the lower reaches of the Billboard Hot 100. It was also included on the 1972 album The Killer Rocks On.

In 1968, The Human Beinz released their version on Capitol Records that became a number one chart hit in Japan, and number 80 in Canada. Also in 1968, Bill Black's Combo recorded the song and was included in the album by the same name. It peaked at number 82 on the pop charts both in the US Billboard Hot 100 and Canadian RPM charts, making it the group's last pop chart entry. Tom Jones performed it on the April 18, 1969 episode of the This Is Tom Jones television series.

Before joining Grand Funk Railroad, Mark Farner and Don Brewer covered this song as "Love Lights" and is included on Monumental Funk. In 1972, Edgar Winter's White Trash recorded the song for the live album Roadwork. Also in 1972, the song was recorded by Bob Seger on the album Smokin' O.P.'s. Country Music legend Conway Twitty recorded the song on his 1980 album Heart and Soul. More recently, a version of the song performed by the Blues Brothers appeared in the 1998 film Blues Brothers 2000. John Boutté adapted the song with different lyrics as "Treme Song" and appears on his 2003 album Jambalaya. It was later used as the theme song for Treme, a 2010–2013 HBO television drama series. It has been a regular feature of guitar soloist Jeff Beck's touring set-list since at least 2015, with the title "Lonnie On the Move", in deference to Lonnie Mack's aforementioned instrumental adaptation.
