= David Lemieux (archivist) =

Canadian audio and film archivist

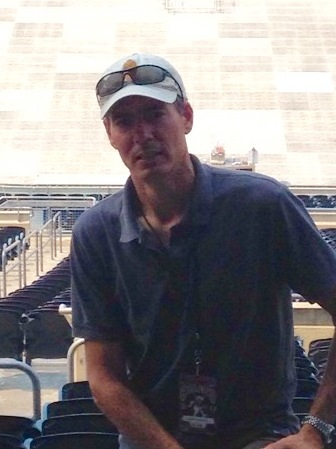
- David Lemieux at Soldier Field in Chicago prior to the final Fare Thee Well concert in 2015

Background information
- Origin: Ottawa, Ontario, Canada
- Genre: Rock
- Occupations: Audio and video archivist Record producer Legacy manager

David Hardy Lemieux (born November 8, 1970) is an audio and film archivist. He is a Grammy, Juno, and Gemini Award voting member. He is the audiovisual archivist and legacy manager for the Grateful Dead.

== Education and early work ==
Lemieux is originally from Ottawa, Ontario, Canada, and was educated at Carleton University in Ottawa (BA in history), Concordia University in Montreal (BFA in film studies) and the University of East Anglia in Norwich, UK (MA in film archiving). Lemieux graduated from Concordia University in 1997 winning the Cinema Prize, awarded to the most outstanding student graduating in the cinema program.

Upon completion of his MA at the University of East Anglia, Lemieux worked at the National Archives of Canada (in Ottawa, Ontario, and Gatineau, Quebec) and the Royal British Columbia Museum Archives in Victoria, British Columbia.

== Grateful Dead ==
He has been working as the Grateful Dead's audiovisual archivist and CD/DVD producer since September 1999. He was put in charge of the Grateful Dead's vault after the August 1999 passing of original Grateful Dead tape archivist Dick Latvala. Lemieux has produced scores of Grateful Dead CD and DVD releases since 2000, including 52 of the Dead's record-setting 66 Billboard Top 40 albums. The Dave's Picks series is titled after Lemieux. He has also produced several CD releases by Jerry Garcia.

Lemieux hosts a daily radio show on The Grateful Dead Channel on SiriusXM Satellite Radio (Channel 23)/Dish Network (Channel 6023), Today in Grateful Dead History, in which he selects a segment of music from that day in the Grateful Dead's history and explains its historical context and other information relating to the selection. He has hosted and produced more than 6,400 shows since its debut in September 2007.

== Personal life ==
When Lemieux turned 51 in 2021, he began running, which he had never done before in any capacity. In his first four years of competitive running from May 2022 to October 2026, Lemieux completed 11 marathons (including two World Major Marathons, the New York City Marathon in 2024 and the London Marathon in 2025), 24 half marathons, and several 10K races. Lemieux is fluent in French. He is vegan.
