= Red Rocks Amphitheatre =

Concert venue near Morrison, Colorado, U.S.

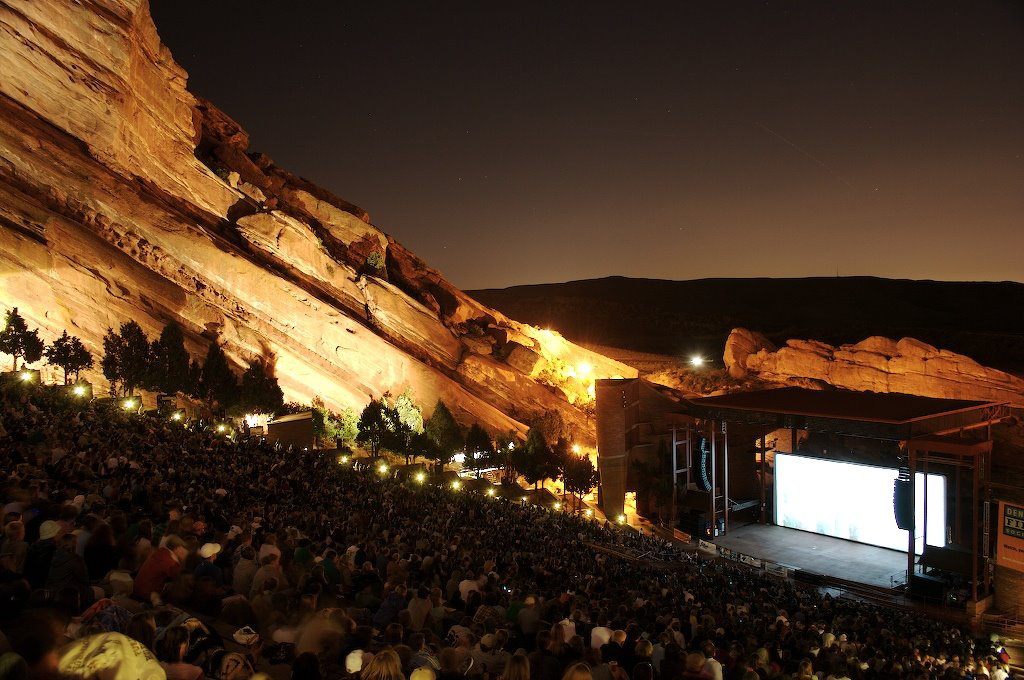
- Red Rocks Amphitheatre in 2006
- Interactive map of Red Rocks Amphitheatre
- Location: Red Rocks Park; 17598 W. Alameda Parkway; Morrison, Colorado, U.S.
- Coordinates: 39°39′55″N 105°12′21″W
- Elevation: 6,450 feet (1,970 m)
- Owner: City and County of Denver
- Operator: City and County of Denver
- Capacity: 9,525

Construction
- Opened: 1906; 120 years ago 1941; 85 years ago
- Architect: Burnham F. Hoyt

Website
- redrocksonline.com

Red Rocks Amphitheatre (also known colloquially as Red Rocks) is an open-air amphitheater near Morrison, Colorado, approximately ten miles (16 km) southwest of Denver. It is owned and operated by the city of Denver. In addition to several other large sandstone formations nearby, the venue is best recognized by its two massive monoliths, named "Ship Rock" and "Creation Rock", as well as the smaller "Stage Rock", which together flank its 9,525 capacity seating area and naturally form the amphitheater. While the venue is primarily known for hosting concerts and music festivals, other events of various types and sizes are held throughout the year.

In 1957, the American Institute of Architects selected Red Rocks to be Colorado's entry at the National Gallery of Art for the AIA's Centennial Exhibition. In 1999, after Pollstar magazine awarded Red Rocks the annual honor of being the best small outdoor venue for the eleventh time, the magazine changed the name of the award to the "Red Rocks Award" and removed Red Rocks from the running.

Construction began in October 2020 to replace the existing stage roof and expand the structure's rigging capacity; the work was completed the following summer.

Denver approved a contract with Short Elliott Hendrickson (SEH) for $4.45 million to plan how to expand and increase accessibility on the backside of the Red Rocks Amphitheatre. This will include new dressing rooms facilities along with improved pathways from the back area to the stage. The design phase of this project is expected to last until December 2030.

== History ==
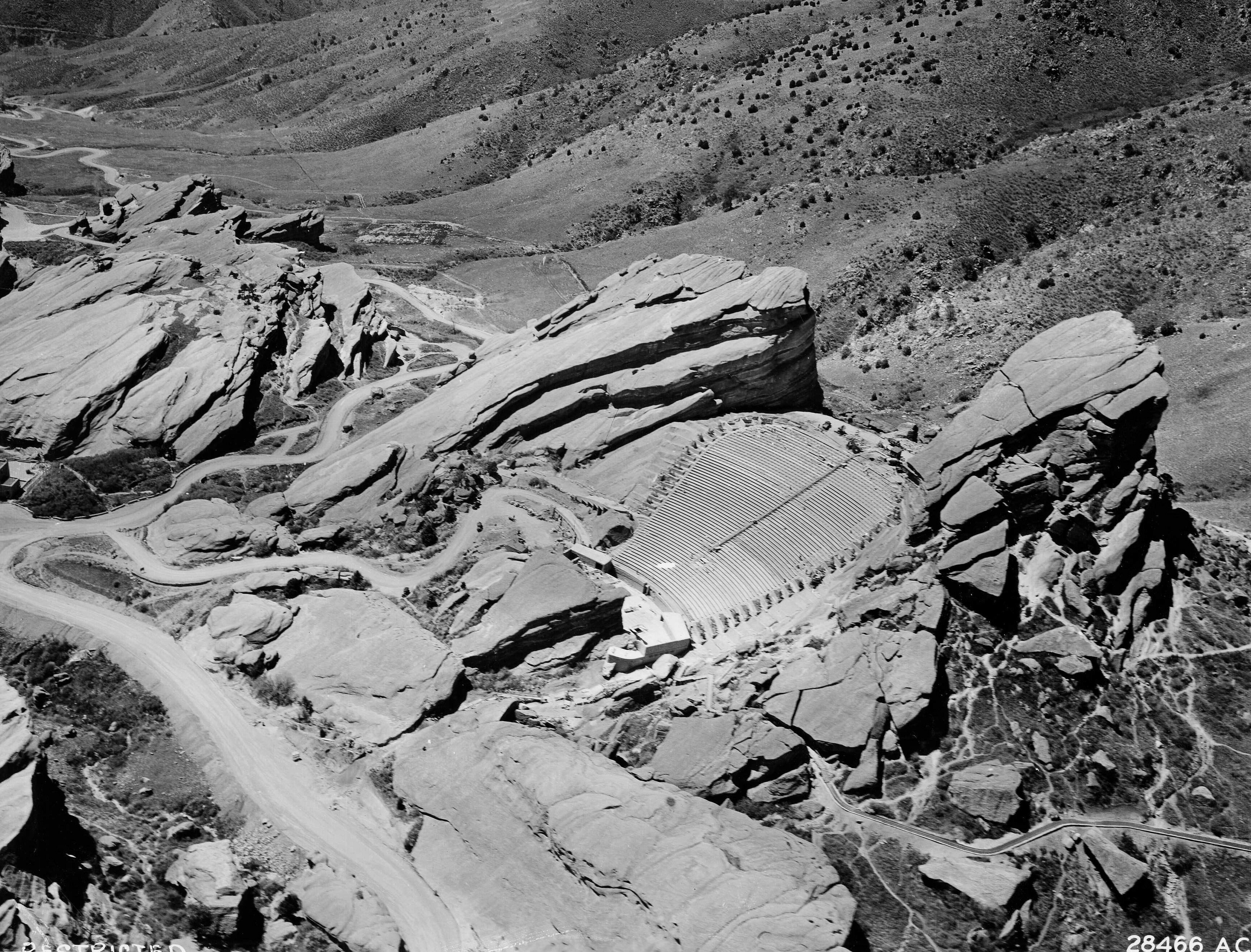
Theatre in 1944

The natural features surrounding the amphitheater were formed millions of years ago as part of the Fountain Formation, then lifted and tilted during a geological upheaval event called the Laramide Orogeny, the same time in which the nearby Garden of the Gods and Flatirons were formed. The characteristic reddish colors of the rock formations is the result of oxidized minerals.

While the grounds were likely used by the Ute tribe in earlier times, an Army expedition led by Stephen Long rediscovered present-day Red Rocks in 1820. The prevalence of the nearby Colorado gold rush between 1858–1859 drew further interest from prospectors and new settlers along the Front Range. Originally named the "Garden of the Angels", Marion Burts became the first recorded owner of the site in 1872. He sold it to Leonard H. Eicholtz, who in turn developed the property into a park in 1878. Nearly 30 years later, Eicholtz sold Red Rocks to famed magazine editor John Brisben Walker in 1906.

The site was renamed to "Garden of the Titans" and further developed to incorporate a temporary platform for hosting concerts from. In addition to the platform, Walker also built the Mount Morrison Cable Incline funicular railway, which carried tourists from the lower area of the park up to the top of Mount Morrison. The incline operated for about five years beginning in 1909. In 1927, George Cranmer, Manager of Denver Parks, convinced the City of Denver to purchase the area of Red Rocks from Walker for $54,133 ($1,014,994 today), officially adopting the title of "Red Rocks" Amphitheatre, a name it had been informally referred to since the area was settled.

Cranmer then convinced Mayor Benjamin Stapleton to build upon the foundation laid by Walker. By enlisting the help of Denver architect Burnham F. Hoyt and Stanley E. Morse, along with labor and materials provided by the Civilian Conservation Corps (CCC) and the Works Progress Administration (WPA) as part of the New Deal program, construction of the amphitheater began in 1936 and was formally dedicated on June 15, 1941, with a performance by Helen Jepson.

== Notable performances ==
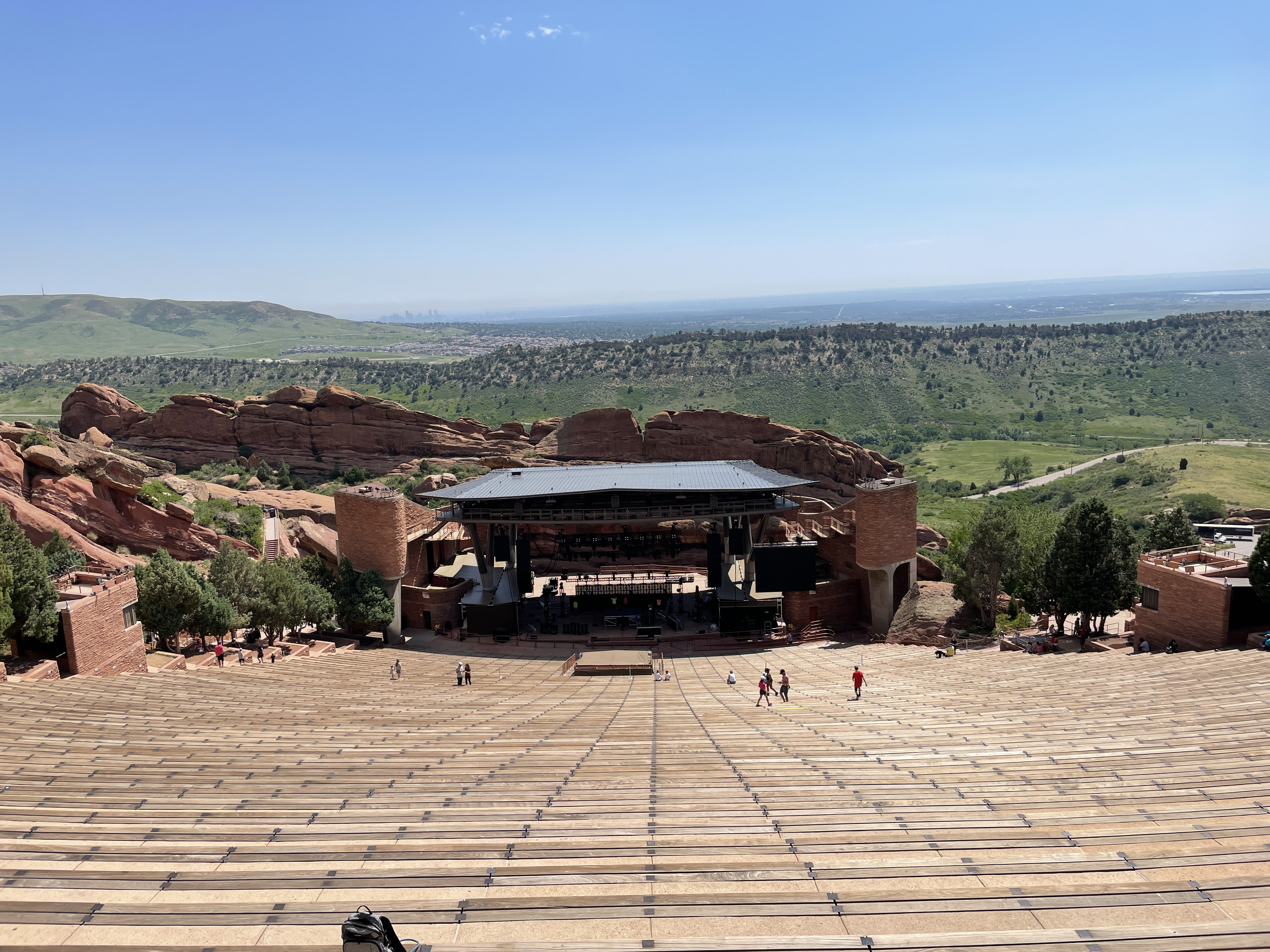
View east from top of Red Rocks Amphitheatre

Public, organizational and private performances have been held at Red Rocks for over a century. The earliest documented performance at the amphitheater was the Grand Opening of the Garden of the Titans, put on by publisher John Brisben Walker on May 31, 1906. Featuring Pietro Satriano and his 25-piece brass band, it was the formal opening of the natural amphitheater for use by the general public after Walker purchased it with the proceeds of his sale of Cosmopolitan.

The amphitheater's largest-scale performance to date was the Feast of Lanterns on September 5, 1908. Commemorating the opening of the scenic road up nearby Mt. Falcon, it was patterned after the festival of Nagasaki, Japan, and featured four military bands and fireworks off Mt. Falcon, Mt. Morrison and two intermediate hills.

Renowned opera singer Mary Garden put Red Rocks on the world musical map with her performance on May 10, 1911. Garden said "Never in any opera house, the world over, have I found more perfect acoustic properties. Never under any roof have I sung with greater ease or had a greater delight in singing.

Upon the full construction of the amphitheater to its present form by the Civilian Conservation Corps, the venue was formally dedicated on June 15, 1941. It has held regular concert seasons almost every year since 1947. On July 23, 1948, Igor Stravinsky conducted the Denver Symphony at Red Rocks. In 2020 and 2021, it was shut down temporarily as a result of the COVID-19 pandemic. The first performance of each season is the Easter Sunrise Service, a nondenominational service held on Easter Sunday of each year. In 1958, Van Cliburn played Red Rocks to a sold-out crowd.

The earliest notable rock performance at Red Rocks was by The Beatles on August 26, 1964, the only concert not sold out during their US-tour. Beatles drummer Ringo Starr later recalled, “I remember it was very high and the air was thin. They were giving us hits from oxygen canisters.” When Starr returned to Red Rocks with his All-Starr Band on June 28, 2000, he asked if anyone in the crowd had been at the Beatles concert thirty-six years earlier. On August 26, 2004, the East-Coast-based Beatles-tribute band 1964 was flown to Denver to re-enact the Beatles concert held at the site exactly forty years earlier. The first country and western show at Red Rocks was on August 29, 1965, headlined by Johnny Cash.

The unique setting has led to the venue's becoming a favorite for many performers: Jimi Hendrix played at Red Rocks on September 1, 1968, along with Vanilla Fudge and Soft Machine. It was the first Red Rocks show booked by concert promoter Barry Fey. Diana Ross & the Supremes performed there on August 14, 1969.

An incident during a performance by Jethro Tull on June 10, 1971, led to a five-year ban of rock concerts at Red Rocks. Approximately 1,000 people without tickets arrived at the sold-out show. Denver police directed the overflow, non-paying crowd to an area behind the theater, where they could hear the music but not see the band. The situation seemed satisfactory until some of the people without tickets attempted to enter the amphitheater by charging at, and breaking through, the police line. Some of those without tickets began lobbing rocks at the police, and the police responded by discharging tear gas at the gate-crashers. The wind carried the tear gas over the hill, into the paying crowd and onto the stage. Following the "Riot at Red Rocks," Denver Mayor William H. McNichols Jr. banned rock concerts from the amphitheater. For the next five years, shows at Red Rocks were limited to softer acts, such as John Denver, Sonny & Cher, The Carpenters, Pat Boone, Seals & Crofts and Carole King. The ban on rock and roll was finally lifted through legal action taken by Barry Fey, who tried to book the band America at the venue in 1975. After being denied a permit by the city, Fey took the city to court, and the court ruled that the city had acted "arbitrarily and capricious[ly]" in banning rock concerts at Red Rocks. Starting in the summer of 1976, the rock bands were once again welcomed at the venue. Jethro Tull played Red Rocks again on June 7, 1988, August 12, 2008, and June 8, 2011.

It was the site of Bruce Springsteen's first outdoor concert in 1978. On June 5, 1983, U2 performed during their War Tour, in front of only 4,400 in very inclement weather. The venue had been sold out, but the crowd size was affected by the weather, with attendees believing the show would be canceled. The show was not canceled because the band could not get their money back for the outlay on filming crews and equipment for the performance. Those who braved the weather and showed up were told personally by Bono, who came to the parking lot and into the crowd more than once, to ignore their seat assignments, and to move as forward as they wished to make the house seem full, since the show was being filmed for what became the group's concert film U2 Live at Red Rocks: Under a Blood Red Sky. The music video for "Sunday Bloody Sunday,” shown in heavy rotation on MTV, was also the fruit of the filming effort. Some songs from the show appear on the group's 1983 live album Under a Blood Red Sky.

Depeche Mode performed at the amphitheater four times: July 1, 1986, July 11 and 12, 1990, during their World Violation Tour, and on August 27, 2009, during their Tour of the Universe, in front of a crowd of 8,679 people. The 2009 show was recorded for the group's live albums project Recording the Universe.

Red Rocks was one of the favored venues for The Grateful Dead and the venue has become a traditional stop for many subsequent jam bands. In total the Grateful Dead played Red Rocks 20 times between 1978 and 1987. The performances on July 7, 1978, and July 8, 1978, were released as part of the July 1978: The Complete Recordings box set, with July 8 having a stand alone release, Red Rocks: 7/8/78. The Grateful Dead held the record for most sold out performances at Red Rocks until 2015.

Widespread Panic holds the record for the most sold-out performances at Red Rocks, with 72 as of June 2024. Blues Traveler has played the venue every Fourth of July since 1993, except 1999 when lead singer and harmonica player John Popper was unable to play due to heart surgery. Phish were banned from performing at Red Rocks after they played four concerts there in August 1996. Fans of the band who showed up to the concerts without tickets were accused of starting a riot outside the amphitheater on the second night, and the nearby town of Morrison was unprepared to accommodate the size of the band's following. Phish was not invited to perform at Red Rocks again until July 2009.

Geddy Lee of Rush said, "It's an amazing location...One of the most stunning concert venues in the United States... or anywhere. I would hazard a guess that it's one of the most beautiful places in the world." Rush played Red Rocks on their R30 30th Anniversary, Snakes and Arrows and Time Machine tours.

Colorado musicians who have performed at Red Rocks include John Denver in 1973, Judy Collins in 1973, Dan Fogelberg in 1984, Big Head Todd and the Monsters in 1994, Earth, Wind & Fire (some members are from Denver) in 2002, The Fray in 2006, DeVotchKa in 2008, 3OH!3 in 2012, Pretty Lights in 2012, OneRepublic in 2013, The Lumineers in 2013, and Strawberry Runners in 2016. As of 2023, Colorado band The String Cheese Incident has played at Red Rocks over 50 times.

On August 7, 2000, the "Film on the Rocks" series started with a screening of Casablanca.

On August 22, 2005, the White Stripes performed at the amphitheater. Lead vocalist and guitarist Jack White has performed solo a number of times.

In 2014, after voters in Colorado legalized marijuana, the Colorado Symphony played a cannabis-themed "Red Rocks on a High Note" show there. In 2018, Yo-Yo Ma began his tour of Bach's Cello Suites at Red Rocks.

On October 5, 2019, AJR played a sold-out show at the amphitheater for their Neotheater World Tour.

During the 2020 pandemic, Red Rocks hosted the Colorado Symphony Strings, which played sold-out Acoustic on the Rocks shows in July and August, following social-distancing guidelines.

In September 2020, virtual shows were streamed live. Despite Denver Arts & Venues announcing the closure of all its venues (including Red Rocks) in September, in-person shows did occur. Other events included drive-in movies for mainstream films and the Denver Film Festival's red carpet movies.

In 2021, Red Rocks Amphitheatre was named the top-grossing and most-attended concert venue of any size, anywhere in the world.

On August 9 and 10, 2022, South Park creators Trey Parker and Matt Stone held a live concert alongside rock bands Primus, Ween and Rush at Red Rocks Amphitheatre, commemorating South Park's 25th anniversary. Besides a few original songs from the supporting bands, the concert mainly consisted of Parker and Stone performing music from the series.

On June 21, 2023, the largest injury-inducing weather event in the venue's history occurred. Before Louis Tomlinson was scheduled to perform, a hailstorm with apple sized hail injured over 90 people, including 7 who were hospitalized.

== Notable recordings ==
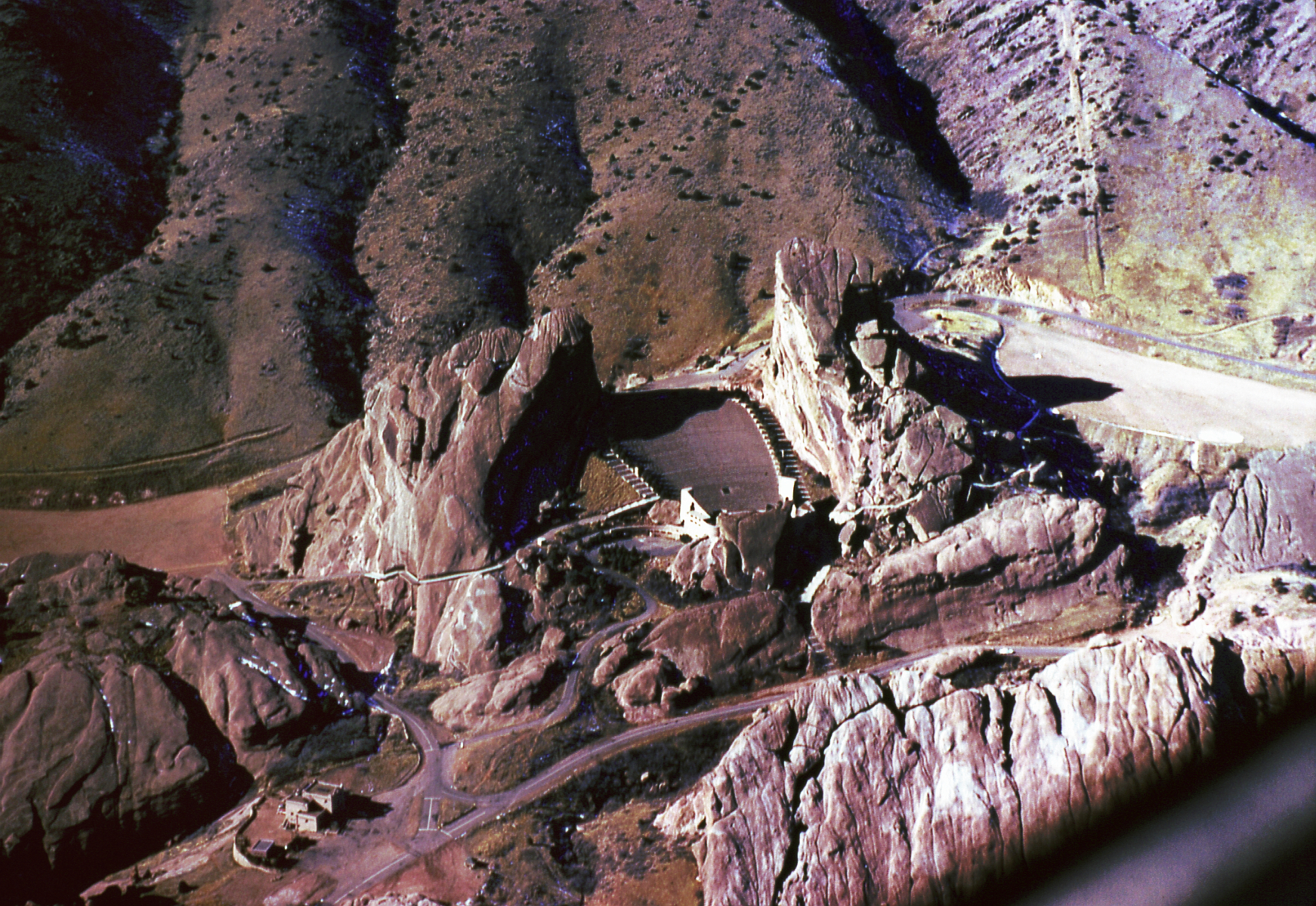
Aerial view, January 1966

Red Rocks has been a popular venue for live recordings, particularly videos, due to the visual uniqueness of the setting. During the 1970s and 1980s, local folk-rocker John Denver recorded several world-televised concerts at Red Rocks. U2's 1983 concert video, Live at Red Rocks: Under a Blood Red Sky, became a bestselling long-form concert video and the performance of "Sunday Bloody Sunday" was played frequently on MTV. Fleetwood Mac singer Stevie Nicks released a 60-minute-long DVD of her August 1986 concert at the amphitheatre, towards the end of her Rock a Little tour. In 1992, The Moody Blues performed live for the first time with a symphony orchestra for the PBS special "A Night at Red Rocks with the Colorado Symphony Orchestra". The concert also was released on CD and DVD, along with a companion DVD, The Other Side of Red Rocks, which documented show rehearsals and preparation, as well as concert excerpts.

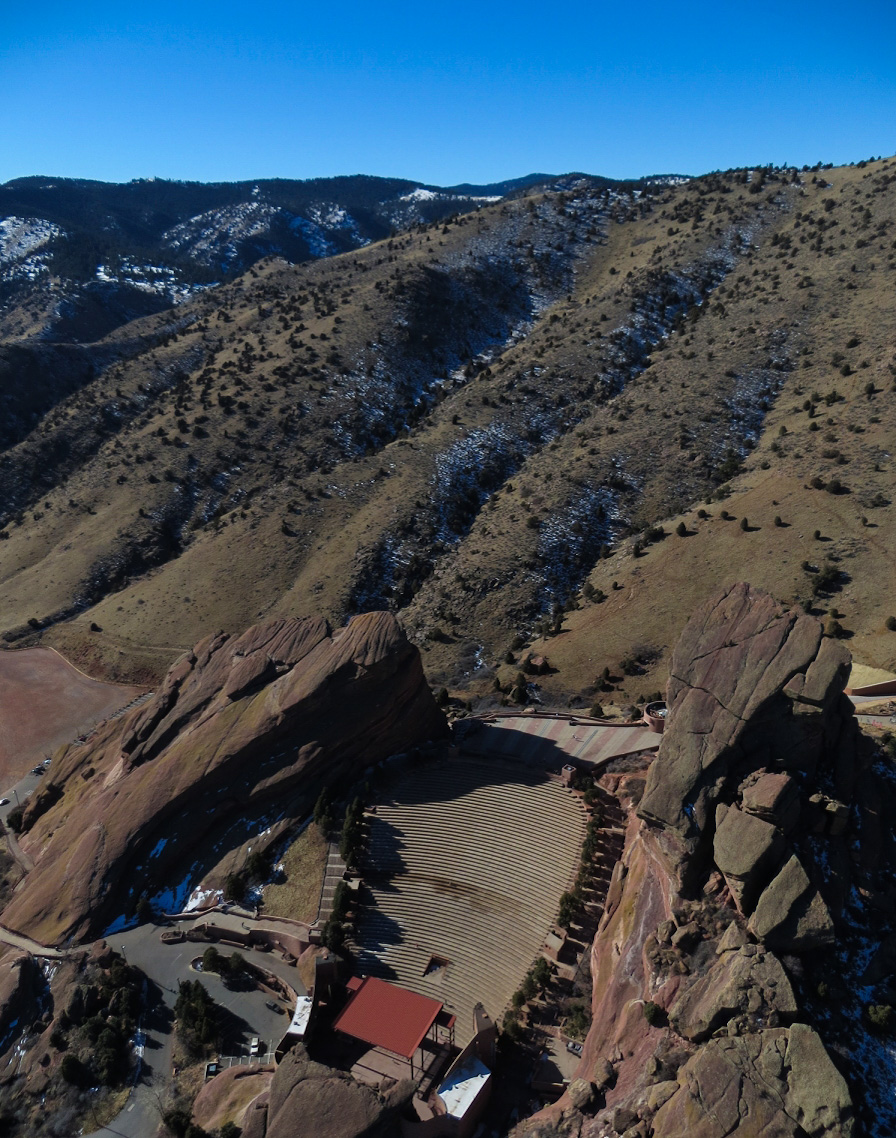
UAV Aerial view, January 2013

Other Red Rocks material on CD and DVD includes Dave Matthews Band's albums Live at Red Rocks 8.15.95 and the CD/DVD Weekend on the Rocks, which is a compilation of the band's four-night run in 2005, their last performances at the venue. Also recorded are The Samples live album Live in Colorado, John Tesh's Live at Red Rocks and Worship at Red Rocks, the Incubus DVD Alive at Red Rocks, Blues Traveler's Live on the Rocks album, Steve Martin's comedy album A Wild and Crazy Guy, The Moody Blues's A Night at Red Rocks with the Colorado Symphony Orchestra, and Boukman Eksperyans' album "Live At Red Rocks". Widespread Panic's DVD The Earth Will Swallow You features a 15-minute segment on Red Rocks.

The Grateful Dead performed at Red Rocks 20 times. 7/7/78 and 7/8/78 have been released in their entirety on July 1978: The Complete Recordings and Red Rocks: 7/8/78.

The live Neil Young album Road Rock Vol. 1 and its accompanying DVD, Red Rocks Live, were filmed and recorded at Red Rocks in 2000 during the "Silver and Gold" tour. Local Colorado band Big Head Todd and the Monsters released a DVD and live album of a 1995 performance in 2003, capturing what has become a local annual early season tradition. In 2009, they followed the original recording with a two-CD/1DVD set from their June 2008 performance.

A two-volume 2003 album, Carved In Stone– Volume 1, featured live recordings of 10 artists including R.E.M., Ben Harper, Coldplay, The Allman Brothers Band, and Phish, with proceeds benefiting "Preserve The Rocks Fund", a donation-driven reserve dedicated to the rehabilitation and preservation of the historic Red Rocks Amphitheatre. The follow-up live compilation CD, Carved In Stone – Volume 2, Live at Red Rocks Amphitheatre was released in October 2007. Erik Dyce, Trevor Pryce of Outlook Music Co., and Jeff Giarraputo of Factory Labs were the executive producers, making it the first venue to issue a CD and the first commercial release of these live tunes.

Phish frontman Trey Anastasio included excerpts from his 2005 performance at Red Rocks on the DVD that accompanied his album Shine. Country musician Gary Allan filmed the music video for his song "Watching Airplanes" during a live, sold-out concert at Red Rocks in August 2007. A portion of British rock band Oasis's rockumentary film Lord Don't Slow Me Down was filmed at Red Rocks. A Perfect Circle also included one live video recording on the CD-DVD AMotion. Insane Clown Posse played with Twiztid, Blaze Ya Dead Homie, Boondox, the Axe Murder Boyz, Grave Plott, The ROC, and Motown Rage in May 2008 at Red Rocks at perform the 'first annual' Hatchet Attacks Super Show, for which they released a video later that year.

Depeche Mode recorded their show at the amphitheatre on August 29, 2009, for their live album project, Recording the Universe.

Country singer Kenny Chesney included a live version of "You and Tequila", a duet with Grace Potter, on his album Welcome to the Fishbowl. The recording has a segment with audience participation singing the chorus "You and Tequila make me crazy, run like poison in my blood, one more night could kill me baby, one is one too many, one more is never enough".

A Perfect Circle recorded the DVD portion of their A Perfect Circle Live: Featuring Stone and Echo box set on August 2, 2011. Also included in the box set is a CD of the audio from the show.

On August 29, 2012, Mumford & Sons recorded their live performance of their first single, "I Will Wait" from their new CD Babel at the amphitheatre. The performance was released on September 9, 2012, as the band's official video for the song. The band released a full-length DVD of their show at Red Rocks, recorded on August 28 and 29, 2012, entitled The Road To Red Rocks.

On September 1, 2014, OneRepublic, a band hailing from Colorado Springs, announced they would be heading back to Red Rocks for a special performance to close out the North American leg of their Native Summer Tour. While performing the song "I Lived" they recorded the band, the audience, and one of their fans (Bryan Warnecke) for the "I Lived" music video. The video also featured several aerial views of the venue during the day as well as during the concert itself. This performance of the song was done to help spread awareness for cystic fibrosis and to share Bryan's journey with the disease. The music video was released on September 25, 2014.

On June 10, 2015, Barenaked Ladies performed at Red Rocks on their Last Summer on Earth 2015 tour. The performance was aired on AXS TV, then later released on May 20, 2016, as a live album titled BNL Rocks Red Rocks and in 2017 the English hard rock supergroup Bad Company.

Opeth released a live DVD and Blu-ray of their May 11, 2017, performance at Red Rocks on November 2, 2018. Gojira performed the same night and released the full concert, titled Live At Red Rocks, on YouTube on May 20, 2020.

Australian singer-songwriter Vance Joy released a live recording of his performance at Red Rocks recorded during his Nation of Two World Tour. The album was recorded on May 30, 2018 and released in November 16, 2018, entitled Live at Red Rocks Amphitheatre.

The American pop-punk band NOFX released a live recording of their full 18-minute song "The Decline (EP)" featuring Baz's orchestra in a 2019 performance at the venue. Comedian Bill Burr filmed a comedy special at Red Rocks in September 2021.

In 2025, American singer-songwriter Gracie Abrams released a live version of her The Secret of Us Tour concert at Red Rocks, recorded during the 2025 leg of the tour, and available exclusively on Apple Music.

== In film and television ==
The final portion of Waylon Jennings' hour long TV special Waylon in 1980 was filmed at Red Rocks during a 1980 concert. The entire performance was recorded and is set to be released by his son Shooter Jennings sometime in the near future, it will be Waylon's first posthumous live album release.

In 1987, former Colorado Senator Gary Hart announced his campaign for president with a press conference at Red Rocks.

Part of the 1990 film The Adventures of Ford Fairlane was filmed at Red Rocks. Opening sequences feature the fictional rock band "Black Plague" playing at Red Rocks Amphitheatre where lead singer Bobby Black (played by Vince Neil) makes a grand entrance hanging from the rock face of the landmark red rocks above the crowd swooping on stage via zipline.

== Colorado Music Hall of Fame ==
In June 2015, the Colorado Music Hall of Fame opened its doors in the Trading Post at Red Rocks.

== Gallery ==
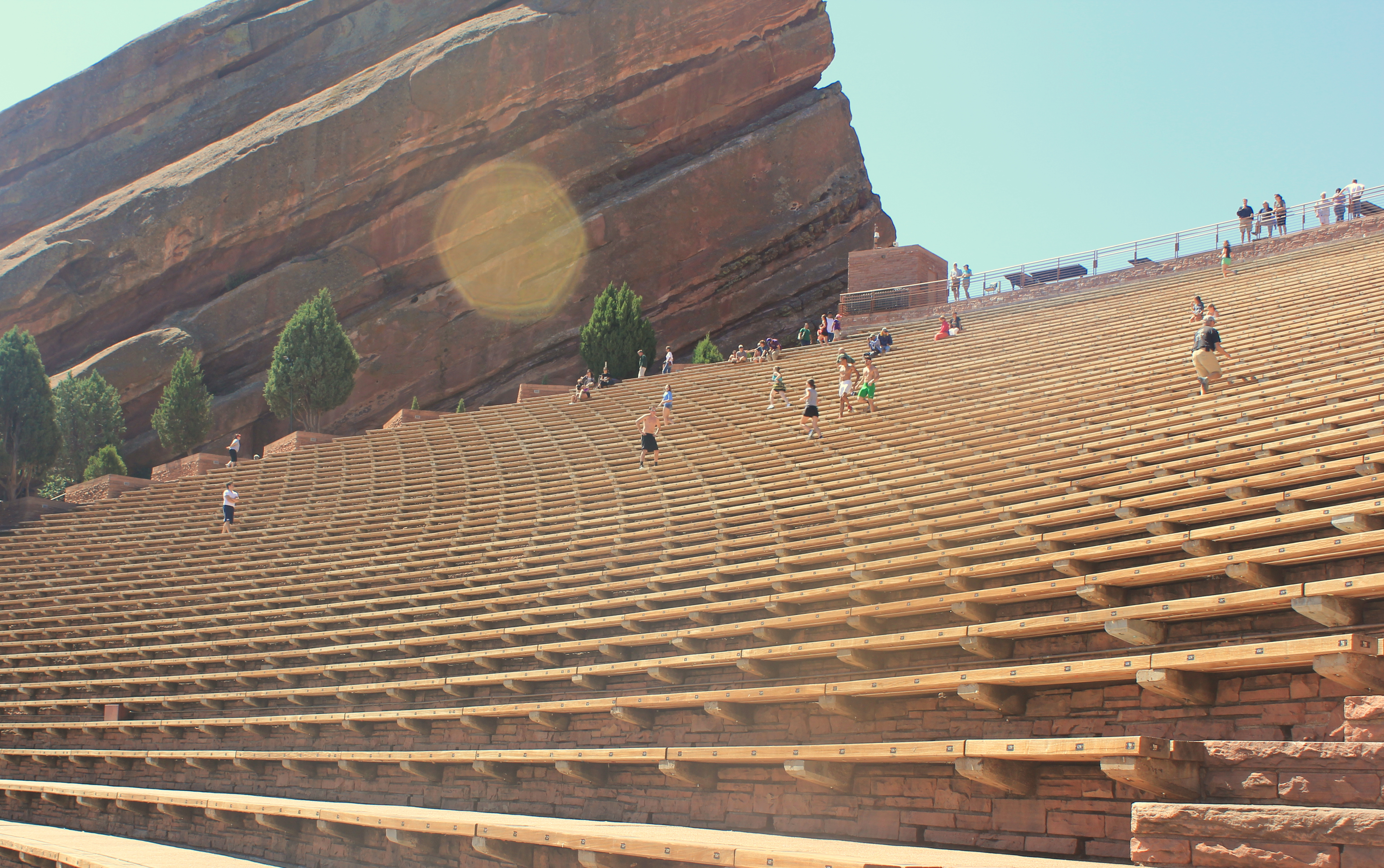
Red Rocks Amphitheatre seating

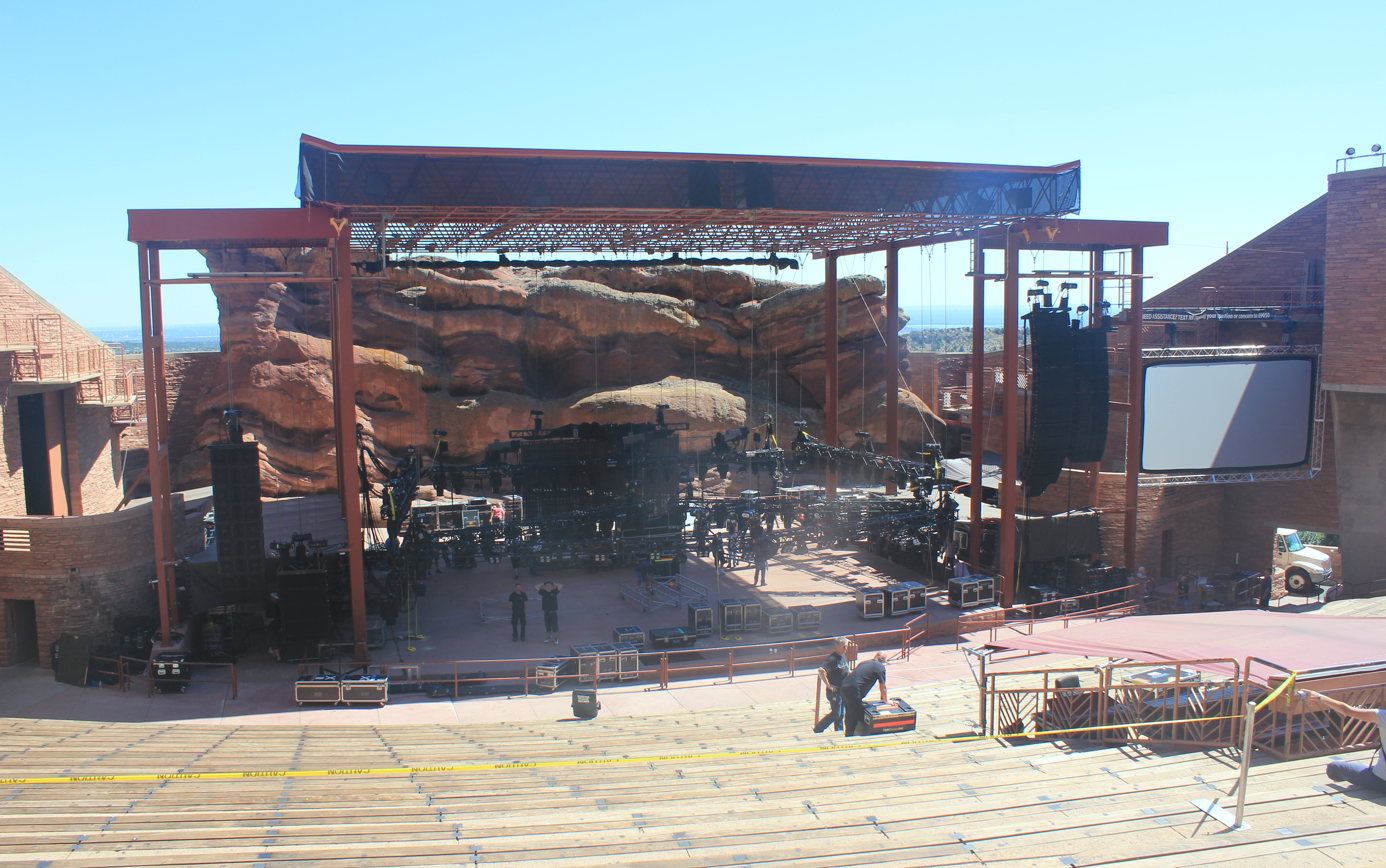
Red Rocks Amphitheatre stage

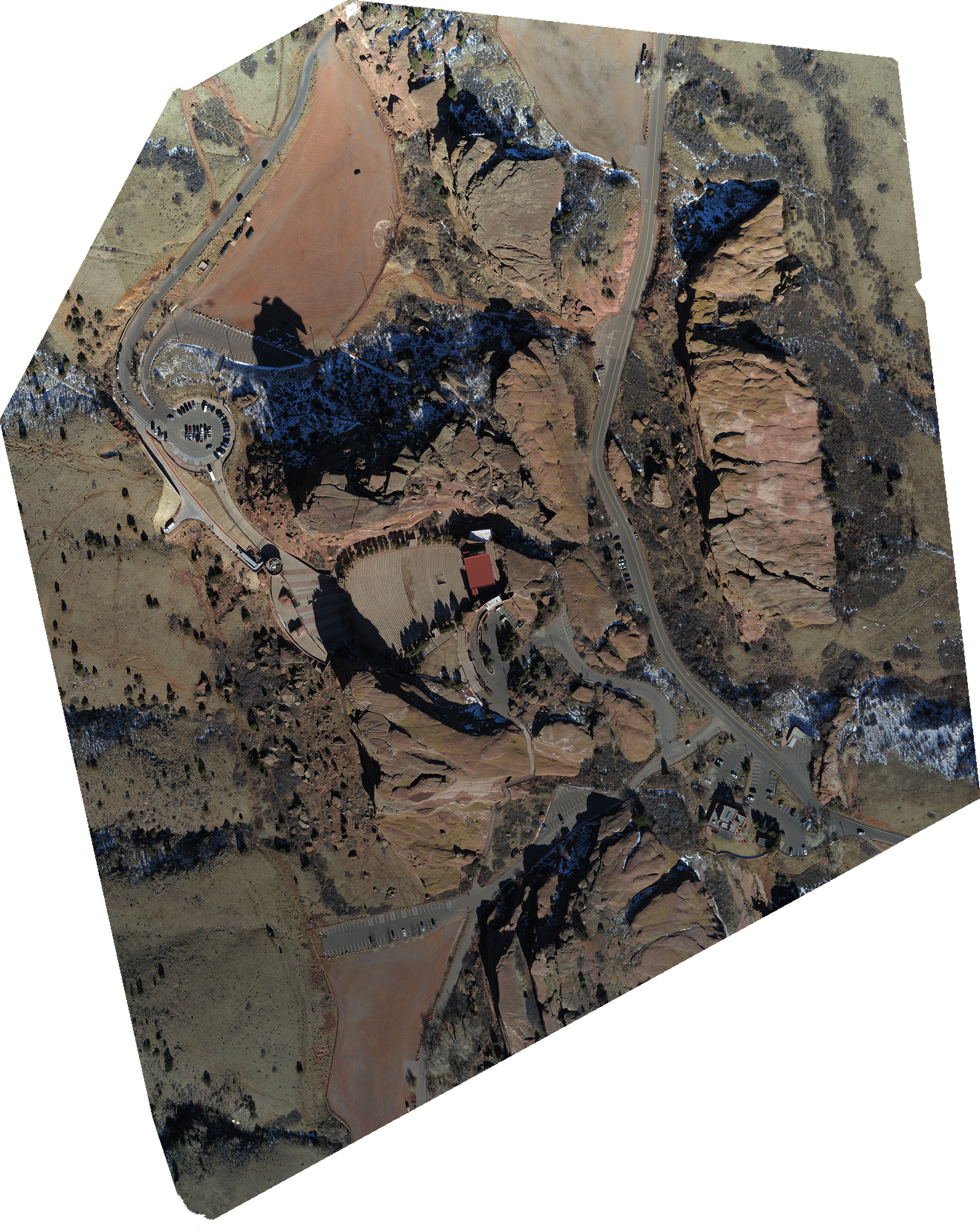
Red Rocks Aerial Photogrammetry mission

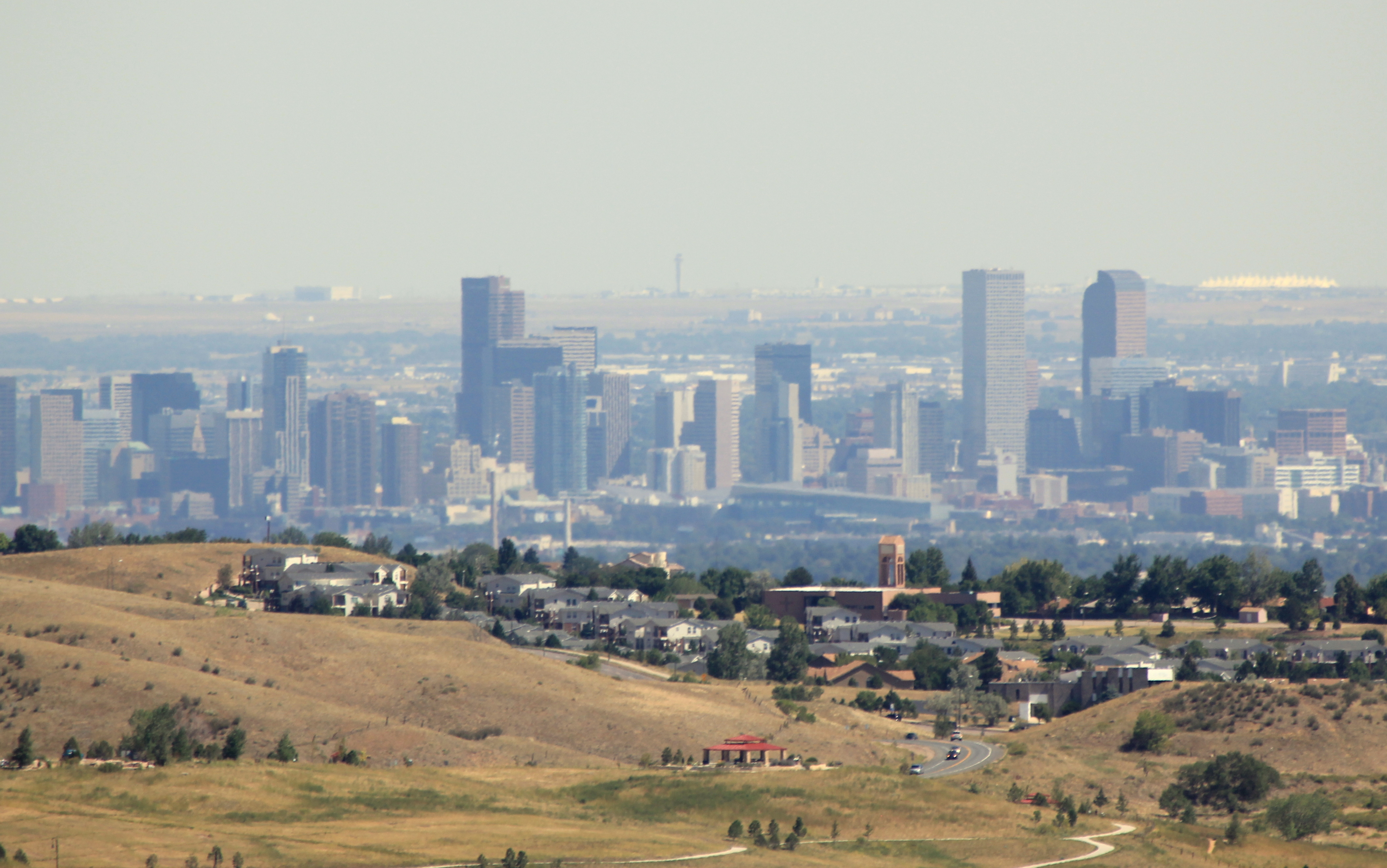
Downtown Denver view from Red Rocks Amphitheatre in 2011, with the control tower for Denver International Airport and the peaks of its Jeppesen Terminal building in the distant background

== See also ==
- Category:Albums recorded at Red Rocks Amphitheatre
- List of contemporary amphitheatres
- Mishawaka Amphitheatre, outdoor concert venue outside of Fort Collins, Colorado
- Red Rocks Park
