= Dave's Picks Volume 22 =

Live album by Grateful Dead
- Released: May 1, 2017
- Recorded: December 7, 1971
- Venue: Felt Forum; New York City
- Genre: Rock
- Length: 295:00
- Label: Rhino
- Producer: Grateful Dead

Grateful Dead chronology
| July 29 1966, P.N.E. Garden Aud., Vancouver Canada (2017) | Dave's Picks Volume 22 (2017) | May 1977: Get Shown the Light (2017) |

Alternative cover
- Dave's Picks 2017 Bonus Disc

Dave's Picks Volume 22 is a live album by the rock band the Grateful Dead. It contains the complete concert recorded at the Felt Forum in New York City on December 7, 1971. It also includes the second set and the encore recorded at the same venue the previous night. It was produced as a limited edition of 16,500 copies, and released on May 1, 2017.

A bonus disc was included with shipments of the album to 2017 Dave's Picks subscribers. This disc contains most of the first set recorded at the December 6 concert.

== Concerts ==
The Grateful Dead performed at the Felt Forum on Saturday, Sunday, Monday, and Tuesday, December 4, 5, 6, and 7, 1971. This was the band's only appearance at that venue, which is located below the main arena at Madison Square Garden. Tickets were priced at $3.50, $4.50, and $5.50. The opening act at these shows was the New Riders of the Purple Sage.

== Critical reception ==
On AllMusic, Timothy Monger said, "The final show of a four-night stand in New York, 12/7/71 was still the early days of newcomer Keith Godchaux splitting keyboard duties with founder Pigpen McKernan, who is featured heavily here. Historically, this can be seen as a sort of run-up to the epic Europe '72 tour which would commence just a couple of months later..."

== Track listing ==
Disc 1

First set:

1. "Cold Rain and Snow" (traditional, arranged by Grateful Dead) – 6:30
2. "Beat It On Down the Line" (Jesse Fuller) – 3:38
3. "Mr. Charlie" (Ron McKernan, Robert Hunter) – 4:11
4. "Sugaree" (Jerry Garcia, Hunter) – 7:56
5. "Jack Straw" (Bob Weir, Hunter) – 5:24
6. "Next Time You See Me" (William Harvey, Frank Forest) – 5:28
7. "Tennessee Jed" (Garcia, Hunter) – 7:37
8. "El Paso" (Marty Robbins) – 4:30
9. "Brokedown Palace" (Garcia, Hunter) – 6:15
10. "Run Rudolph Run" (Johnny Marks, Marvin Brodie) – 3:43
11. "You Win Again" (Hank Williams) – 4:09
12. "Cumberland Blues" (Garcia, Phil Lesh, Hunter) – 5:52
13. "Casey Jones" (Garcia, Hunter) – 5:52

Second set:

14. "Sugar Magnolia" (Weir, Hunter) – 6:35

Disc 2

1. "Ramble On Rose" (Garcia, Hunter) – 6:49
2. "Big Boss Man" (Al Smith, Luther Dixon) – 5:43
3. "Mexicali Blues" (Weir, John Perry Barlow) – 3:46
4. "Brown-Eyed Women" (Garcia, Hunter) – 5:01
5. "Me and My Uncle" (John Phillips) – 3:15
6. "Smokestack Lightning" (Chester Burnett) – 12:43
7. "Deal" (Garcia, Hunter) – 6:02
8. "Truckin'" (Garcia, Lesh, Weir, Hunter) – 9:03
9. "Not Fade Away" (Norman Petty, Charles Hardin) – 6:18
10. "Going Down the Road Feelin' Bad" (traditional, arranged by Grateful Dead) – 8:26
11. "Not Fade Away" (Petty, Hardin) – 4:01

Encore:

12. "One More Saturday Night" (Weir) – 4:56

Disc 3

December 6, 1971 second set:

1. "Big Railroad Blues" (Noah Lewis, arranged by Grateful Dead) – 4:47
2. "Me and My Uncle" (Phillips) – 3:16
3. "Ramble On Rose" (Garcia, Hunter) – 7:09
4. "Playing in the Band" (Weir, Mickey Hart, Hunter) – 6:32
5. "Cryptical Envelopment" (Garcia) – 1:57
6. "Drums" (Bill Kreutzmann) – 2:17
7. "The Other One" (Weir, Kreutzmann) – 7:39
8. "Me and Bobby McGee" (Kris Kristofferson, Fred Foster) – 6:00
9. "The Other One" (Weir) – 13:50
10. "Wharf Rat" (Garcia, Hunter) – 11:44
11. "One More Saturday Night" (Weir) – 5:58

December 6, 1971 encore:

12. "Uncle John's Band" (Garcia, Hunter) – 6:13

Dave's Picks 2017 bonus disc

December 6, 1971 first set selections:

1. "Truckin'" (Garcia, Lesh, Weir, Hunter) – 9:57
2. "Loser" (Garcia, Hunter) – 7:31
3. "Mr. Charlie" (McKernan, Hunter) – 4:23
4. "Jack Straw" (Weir, Hunter) – 5:14
5. "China Cat Sunflower" (Garcia, Hunter) – 4:56
6. "I Know You Rider" (traditional, arranged by Grateful Dead) – 5:04
7. "Tennessee Jed" (Garcia, Hunter) – 7:25
8. "Mexicali Blues" (Weir, Barlow) – 3:46
9. "Black Peter" (Garcia, Hunter) – 9:38
10. "Casey Jones" (Garcia, Hunter) – 6:01

Note: The song list from the December 6, 1971 Felt Forum concert was:

First set: "Truckin'"^{[B]} · "Loser"^{[B]} · "Mr. Charlie"^{[B]} · "Jack Straw"^{[B]} · "China Cat Sunflower"^{[B]} · "I Know You Rider"^{[B]} · "Run Rudolph Run"^{[C]} · "El Paso"^{[C]} · "Tennessee Jed"^{[B]} · "Mexicali Blues"^{[B]} · "Black Peter"^{[B]} · "Next Time You See Me"^{[C]} · "Casey Jones"^{[B]}

Second set: "Big Railroad Blues"^{[A]} · "Me and My Uncle"^{[A]} · "Ramble On Rose"^{[A]} · "Playing in the Band"^{[A]} · "Cryptical Envelopment"^{[A]} · "Drums"^{[A]} · "The Other One"^{[A]} · "Me and Bobby McGee"^{[A]} · "The Other One"^{[A]} · "Wharf Rat"^{[A]} · "One More Saturday Night"^{[A]}

Encore: "Uncle John's Band"^{[A]}

[A] Included on disc 3
[B] Included on bonus disc
[C] Not included

== Personnel ==
Grateful Dead

- Jerry Garcia – guitar, vocals
- Keith Godchaux – keyboards
- Bill Kreutzmann – drums
- Phil Lesh – bass, vocals
- Ron "Pigpen" McKernan – organ, harmonica, vocals
- Bob Weir – guitar, vocals

Production

- Produced by Grateful Dead
- Produced for release by David Lemieux
- CD mastering: Jeffrey Norman
- Recording: Rex Jackson
- Art direction, design: Steve Vance
- Cover art: Dave Van Patten
- Liner notes essay "New Venue, New Keyboards, New York" – Gary Lambert
- Executive producer – Mark Pinkus
- Associate producers – Doran Tyson, Ivette Ramos
- Tape research – Michael Wesley Johnson
- Tapes provided through the assistance of ABCD Enterprises, LLC

== Charts ==
| Chart (2017) | Peak position |
|---|---|
| US Billboard 200 | 34 |
