= PNE Garden Auditorium =

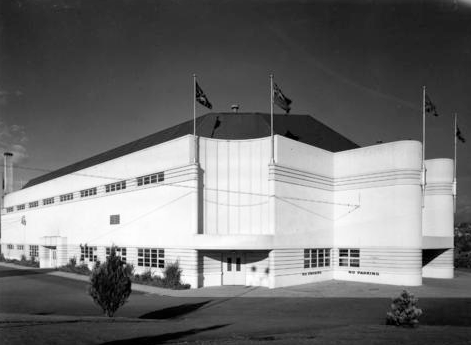
The Exhibition Garden building in Hastings Park, Vancouver 1940

PNE Garden Auditorium is a multi-purpose indoor arena in Vancouver, Canada, located on the grounds of the Pacific National Exhibition. It opened in 1940 and was known as the Exhibition Garden.

During World War II, the Pacific National Exhibition was closed and the fairgrounds served as a military training facility. It was also used as a detainment centre for interned Japanese Canadians.

It hosted the weightlifting events at the 1954 British Empire and Commonwealth Games.

From the mid-1950s until 1980, it was a very popular concert venue, hosting artists such as Ike & Tina Turner, the Police, Tom Petty, Meat Loaf, Blondie, Rush, Heart, Lynyrd Skynyrd, Kiss, Fleetwood Mac, Pink Floyd, the Kinks and Little Richard. A Grateful Dead live album, July 29 1966, P.N.E. Garden Aud., Vancouver Canada, was recorded at the auditorium.
