= Dave's Picks Volume 18 =

Live album by Grateful Dead
- Released: May 1, 2016
- Recorded: July 17, 1976
- Venue: Orpheum Theatre, San Francisco
- Genre: Rock
- Length: 207:05 (bonus disc 69:25)
- Label: Rhino
- Producer: Grateful Dead

Grateful Dead chronology
| Capitol Theatre, Passaic, NJ, 4/25/77 (2016) | Dave's Picks Volume 18 (2016) | Red Rocks: 7/8/78 (2016) |

Alternative cover
- Dave's Picks 2016 Bonus Disc

Dave's Picks Volume 18 is a three-CD live album by the rock band the Grateful Dead. It contains the complete concert recorded on July 17, 1976 at the Orpheum Theatre in San Francisco, California. It was produced as a limited edition of 16,500 copies, and released on May 1, 2016.

The album also includes seven songs recorded live at the same venue the previous night. A bonus disc, included with shipments of the album to 2016 Dave's Picks subscribers, contains eight more songs from the July 16 concert.

== Recording ==
In July 1976 the Grateful Dead played a six-show, seven-night concert run at the Orpheum Theatre in San Francisco. The shows were promoted by Bill Graham. The final show of the run, on Sunday, July 18, was broadcast by KSAN radio. Each audience member was provided with a glass of champagne, used for a surprise toast to the band at the beginning of the concert.

At the July 17 concert, vocalist Donna Jean Godchaux was absent from the second set.

== Track listing ==
Disc 1
First set:

1. "Promised Land" (Chuck Berry) – 4:37
2. "Mississippi Half-Step Uptown Toodeloo" (Jerry Garcia, Robert Hunter) – 9:42
3. "Mama Tried" (Merle Haggard) – 3:04
4. "Deal" (Garcia, Hunter) – 5:03
5. "New Minglewood Blues" (traditional, arranged by Grateful Dead) – 4:58
6. "Peggy-O" (traditional, arranged by Grateful Dead) – 9:14
7. "Big River" (Johnny Cash) – 6:23
8. "Sugaree" (Garcia, Hunter) – 11:30
9. "Johnny B. Goode" (Berry) – 4:24

Second set:

10. "Samson and Delilah" (traditional, arranged by Grateful Dead) – 7:41

Disc 2

1. "Comes a Time" > (Garcia, Hunter) – 16:00
2. "Drums" > (Mickey Hart, Bill Kreutzmann) – 1:39
3. "The Other One" > (Bob Weir, Kreutzmann) – 5:46
4. "Space" > (Garcia, Phil Lesh, Weir) – 10:00
5. "Eyes of the World" > (Garcia, Hunter) – 7:37
6. "Jam" > (Grateful Dead) – 7:21
7. "The Other One" > (Weir, Kreutzmann) – 3:36
8. "Goin' Down the Road Feeling Bad" > (traditional, arranged by Grateful Dead) – 7:10
9. "One More Saturday Night" (Weir) – 6:12

First encore:

10. "U.S. Blues" (Garcia, Hunter) – 7:16

Disc 3
Second encore:

1. "Not Fade Away" (Norman Petty, Charles Hardin) – 14:26

Selections from July 16, 1976:

2. "Big River" (Cash) – 7:02
3. "Brown-Eyed Women" (Garcia, Hunter) – 5:50
4. "Looks Like Rain" (Weir, John Barlow) – 7:35
5. "Peggy-O" (traditional, arranged by Grateful Dead) – 9:19
6. "The Music Never Stopped" > (Weir, Barlow) – 5:53
7. "Scarlet Begonias" (Garcia, Hunter) – 10:56
8. "U.S. Blues" (Garcia, Hunter) – 6:33

Dave's Picks 2016 Bonus Disc
Selections from July 16, 1976:

1. "Playing in the Band" > (Weir, Hart, Hunter) – 15:54
2. "Cosmic Charlie" (Garcia, Hunter) – 8:03
3. "Spanish Jam" > (Grateful Dead) – 9:08
4. "Drums" > (Hart, Kreutzmann) – 3:53
5. "The Wheel" > (Garcia, Hunter, Kreutzmann) – 6:35
6. "Playing in the Band" (Weir, Hart, Hunter) – 5:51
7. "High Time" (Garcia, Hunter) – 10:13
8. "Sugar Magnolia" (Weir, Hunter) – 9:50

Notes

- Sites that archive information about Grateful Dead concerts break down track 1 on the bonus disk into two songs. "Playing in the Band" occupies the first three minutes or so, and is followed by "Stronger than Dirt" for about twelve minutes. The latter is the first section of an instrumental suite called "King Solomon's Marbles" which appears on the Blues for Allah album. The July 16 concert was the last of the six times that the band played "Stronger than Dirt" live.
- The song list for the July 16, 1976 concert at the Orpheum Theatre was:

First set: "Cold Rain and Snow" · "Cassidy" · "Deal" · "Mama Tried" · "Row Jimmy" · "Big River"^{[A]} · "Brown Eyed Women"^{[A]} · "Looks Like Rain"^{[A]} · "Peggy-O"^{[A]} · "The Music Never Stopped"^{[A]} · "Scarlet Begonias"^{[A]}

Second set: "Playing in the Band"^{[B]} · "Cosmic Charlie"^{[B]} · "Samson and Delilah" · "Spanish Jam"^{[B]} · "Drums"^{[B]} · "The Wheel"^{[B]} · "Playing in the Band"^{[B]} · "Around and Around" · "High Time"^{[B]} · "Sugar Magnolia"^{[B]}

Encore: "U.S. Blues"^{[A]}

[A] Included on disc 3
[B] Included on bonus disc

== Personnel ==
Grateful Dead

- Jerry Garcia – guitar, vocals
- Donna Jean Godchaux – vocals
- Keith Godchaux – keyboards
- Mickey Hart – drums
- Bill Kreutzmann – drums
- Phil Lesh – bass
- Bob Weir – guitar, vocals

Production

- Produced by Grateful Dead
- Produced for release by David Lemieux
- Executive producer: Mark Pinkus
- Associate producers: Doran Tyson, Ivette Ramos
- CD mastering: Jeffrey Norman
- Recording: Betty Cantor-Jackson
- Art direction, design: Steve Vance
- Cover art: Justin Helton
- Photos: Walter Jebe
- Tape research: Michael Wesley Johnson
- Archival research: Nicholas Meriwether
- Liner notes: Blair Jackson, Joel Selvin, Kim Paris

== Charts ==
| Chart (2016) | Peak position |
|---|---|
| US Billboard 200 | 38 |
