= Dave's Picks Volume 19 =

Live album by Grateful Dead
- Released: August 1, 2016
- Recorded: January 23-24, 1970
- Venue: Honolulu Civic Auditorium; Honolulu, Hawaii
- Genre: Rock
- Length: 190:20
- Label: Rhino
- Producer: Grateful Dead

Grateful Dead chronology
July 1978: The Complete Recordings (2016)	Dave's Picks Volume 19 (2016)	Dave's Picks Volume 20 (2016)

Dave's Picks Volume 19 is a three-CD live album by the rock band the Grateful Dead. It contains the complete concert recorded on January 23, 1970, at the Honolulu Civic Auditorium in Honolulu, Hawaii. It also includes bonus tracks recorded the following night at the same venue. It was produced as a limited edition of 16,500 copies, and was released on August 1, 2016.

== Critical reception ==
In All About Jazz, Doug Colette wrote, "As [David Lemieux] implies ever so strongly in his account of the iconic band's metamorphosis, the Grateful Dead were never more versatile than at this point of their career, equally conversant in the respective approaches of the psychedelic warriors, genteel nouveau folkies and uproarious dance band."

== Track listing ==
Disc 1
January 23, 1970:

1. "China Cat Sunflower" → (Jerry Garcia, Robert Hunter) – 4:35
2. "I Know You Rider" → (traditional, arranged by Grateful Dead) – 6:11
3. "Black Peter" (Garcia, Hunter) – 8:36
4. "The Yellow Dog Story" (Bob Weir) – 3:14
5. "Hard to Handle" (Otis Redding, Alvertis Isbell, Allen Jones) – 5:41
6. "Mama Tried" (Merle Haggard) – 3:10
7. "Casey Jones" (Garcia, Hunter) – 1:22
8. "Dire Wolf" (Garcia, Hunter) – 4:27
9. "Good Lovin'" (Rudy Clark, Arthur Resnick) – 10:00
10. "That's It for the Other One" – 21:57
  - "Cryptical Envelopment" (Garcia)
  - "Drums" (Mickey Hart, Bill Kreutzmann)
  - "The Other One" (Weir, Kreutzmann)
  - "Cryptical Envelopment" (Garcia)

Disc 2

1. "Dark Star" → (Garcia, Hart, Kreutzmann, Phil Lesh, Ron McKernan, Weir, Hunter) – 18:45
2. "St. Stephen" (Garcia, Lesh, Hunter) – 5:02
3. "Turn On Your Lovelight" (Joseph Scott, Deadric Malone) – 38:09

Disc 3
January 24, 1970:

1. "Cumberland Blues" (Garcia, Lesh, Hunter) – 5:37
2. "Cold Rain and Snow" (traditional, arranged by Grateful Dead) – 5:36
3. "Me and My Uncle" (John Phillips) – 3:32
4. "I'm a King Bee" (James Moore) – 6:25
5. "Mason's Children" (Garcia, Weir, Lesh, Hunter) – 6:47 (Note: Previously released as a bonus track on Workingman's Dead)
6. "Black Peter" (Garcia, Hunter) – 9:41
7. "Good Lovin'" (Clark, Resnick) – 6:23
8. "Feedback" → (Grateful Dead) – 1:23
9. "And We Bid You Goodnight" (traditional, arranged by Grateful Dead) – 4:25
10. "Dancing in the Street" (William "Mickey" Stevenson, Marvin Gaye, Ivy Jo Hunter) – 9:18

== Personnel ==
Grateful Dead

- Tom Constanten – keyboards
- Jerry Garcia – guitar, vocals
- Mickey Hart – drums
- Bill Kreutzmann – drums
- Phil Lesh – bass, vocals
- Ron "Pigpen" McKernan – harmonica, percussion, vocals
- Bob Weir – guitar, vocals

Production

- Produced by Grateful Dead
- Produced for release by David Lemieux
- Associate Producers: Doran Tyson & Ivette Ramos
- Recording: Owsley Stanley
- Mastering: Jeffrey Norman
- Art direction, design: Steve Vance
- Cover art: Justin Helton
- Photos: Stephen Siegel
- Liner notes essay "Dead and Gone to Hawaii": David Lemieux

== Charts ==
Chart (2016)	Peak position
US Billboard 200	26
