= Dave's Picks Volume 21 =

Live album by Grateful Dead
- Released: February 1, 2017
- Recorded: April 2, 1973
- Venues: Boston Garden; Boston, Massachusetts
- Genre: Rock
- Length: 217:06
- Label: Rhino
- Producer: Grateful Dead

Grateful Dead chronology
Dave's Picks Volume 20 (2016)	Dave's Picks Volume 21 (2017)	July 29 1966, P.N.E. Garden Aud., Vancouver Canada (2017)

Dave's Picks Volume 21 is a three-CD live album by the rock group the Grateful Dead. It contains the complete concert recorded on April 2, 1973, at Boston Garden in Boston, Massachusetts. It was produced as a limited edition of 16,500 copies, and was released on February 1, 2017.

== Critical reception ==
On AllMusic, Timothy Monger said, "The last show of their winter/spring tour, Vol. 21 finds the Dead stretching out over two very long sets which, in spite of their length, do not contain either of their major gig-stretchers of the era. In place of "Dark Star" or "The Other One", fans were treated to a whopping 34-song marathon... Several nice long jams can be found, particularly in the second set, making for a diverse and engaging listen."

== Track listing ==
Disc 1

First set:

1. "Promised Land" (Chuck Berry) – 3:38
2. "Deal" (Jerry Garcia, Robert Hunter) – 4:43
3. "Mexicali Blues" (Bob Weir, John Perry Barlow) – 3:42
4. "Brown-Eyed Women" (Garcia, Hunter) – 5:47
5. "Beat It On Down the Line" (Jesse Fuller) – 3:37 (Note: "Tico-Tico" tuning before "Beat It On Down the Line")
6. "Row Jimmy" (Garcia, Hunter) – 8:25
7. "Looks Like Rain" (Weir, Barlow) – 7:51
8. "Wave That Flag" (Garcia, Hunter) – 5:49
9. "Box of Rain" (Phil Lesh, Hunter) – 5:19
10. "Big River" (Johnny Cash) – 4:37
11. "China Cat Sunflower" > (Garcia, Hunter) – 7:13
12. "I Know You Rider" (traditional, arranged by Grateful Dead) – 5:45
13. "You Ain't Woman Enough" (Loretta Lynn) – 3:13
14. "Jack Straw" (Weir, Hunter) – 4:46

Disc 2

1. "Don't Ease Me In" (traditional, arranged by Grateful Dead) – 4:06
2. "Playing in the Band" (Weir, Mickey Hart, Hunter) – 17:31

Second set:

3. "Ramble On Rose" (Garcia, Hunter) – 6:39
4. "Me and My Uncle" (John Phillips) – 3:23
5. "Mississippi Half-Step Uptown Toodeloo" (Garcia, Hunter) – 7:12
6. "Greatest Story Ever Told" (Weir, Hart, Hunter) – 5:25
7. "Loose Lucy" (Garcia, Hunter) – 7:07
8. "El Paso" (Marty Robbins) – 4:29
9. "Stella Blue" (Garcia, Hunter) – 7:48
10. "Around and Around" (Berry) – 4:42

Disc 3

1. "Here Comes Sunshine" > (Garcia, Hunter) – 9:20
2. "Jam" > (Grateful Dead) – 11:08
3. "Me and Bobby McGee" > (Kris Kristofferson, Fred Foster) – 6:07
4. "Weather Report Suite: Prelude" > (Weir) – 3:12
5. "Eyes of the World" > (Garcia, Hunter) – 15:58
6. "China Doll" (Garcia, Hunter) – 6:12
7. "Sugar Magnolia" (Weir, Hunter) – 8:59
8. "Casey Jones" (Garcia, Hunter) – 7:26

Encore:

9. "Johnny B. Goode" > (Berry) – 3:38
10. "And We Bid You Goodnight" (traditional, arranged by Grateful Dead) – 2:12

== Personnel ==
Grateful Dead

- Jerry Garcia – guitar, vocals
- Donna Jean Godchaux – vocals
- Keith Godchaux – keyboards
- Bill Kreutzmann – drums
- Phil Lesh – bass, vocals
- Bob Weir – guitar, vocals

Production

- Produced by Grateful Dead
- Produced for release by David Lemieux
- Mastering: Jeffrey Norman
- Recording: Rex Jackson
- Art direction, design: Steve Vance
- Cover art: Dave Van Patten
- Photos: Patty Norman, Rich "The Fish" Weiner
- Liner Notes: David Lemieux
- Executive producer: Mark Pinkus
- Associate producers: Doran Tyson, Ivette Ramos
- Tape research: Michael Wesley Johnson

== Charts ==
Chart (2017)	Peak position
US Billboard 200	26
