= July 29 1966, P.N.E. Garden Aud., Vancouver Canada =

July 29, 1966, P.N.E. Garden Aud., Vancouver Canada

Live album by Grateful Dead
- Released: April 22, 2017
- Recorded: July 29, 1966
- Venue: PNE Garden Auditorium, Vancouver, British Columbia
- Genre: Rock
- Label: Rhino
- Producer: Grateful Dead

Grateful Dead chronology
Dave's Picks Volume 21 (2017)	July 29, 1966, P.N.E. Garden Aud., Vancouver Canada (2017)	Dave's Picks Volume 22 (2017)

July 29, 1966, P.N.E. Garden Aud., Vancouver Canada is a live album by American rock band the Grateful Dead. It contains the complete concert recorded at the PNE Garden Auditorium in Vancouver, British Columbia, on July 29, 1966. It also includes four songs recorded at the same venue on the following day. It was produced as a two-disc vinyl LP in a limited edition of 6,600 copies. It was released on April 22, 2017, in conjunction with Record Store Day.

The same recording was previously released on CD on January 20, 2017, as the bonus disc for the 50th Anniversary Deluxe Edition of the Grateful Dead's eponymous first album.

The July 29, 1966 concert was the band's first performance outside the United States.

== Production ==
In an interview, Grateful dead archivist David Lemieux said that he had wanted to release this concert as an album, but it was too short for the Dave's Picks series. He said that since the concert was an early one, from before the time of CDs, that made it seem like a good choice for an LP. He added, "As a vinyl release it works extremely well where you get three or four songs per side and they're all really short songs – anywhere from three to five minutes."

== Critical reception ==
Jeff Tamarkin, writing in Relix, said, "As for the jams, the Grateful Dead were still so raw and unformed in the summer of '66 – part garage/punk, part tough blues band, a bit of folk-rock and experimental zeal all filtered through a Prankster-informed lysergic mischievousness – but the elements are all in place. And they're quite often on fire here... but hints of the tenderness they would later cultivate in their original ballads also turn up.... They're still primarily a cover band at this stage – their own tunes are not even close to what they'd soon start turning out when Robert Hunter became involved – but there's no denying the inherent originality and enormity of what they've got going on."

== Track listing ==
Side A

1. "Standing on the Corner" (Jerry Garcia, Bob Weir, Ron McKernan, Phil Lesh, Bill Kreutzmann)
2. "I Know You Rider" (traditional, arranged by Garcia, Weir, McKernan, Lesh, Kreutzmann)
3. "Next Time You See Me" (William Harvey, Frank Forest)
4. "Sittin' on Top of the World" (Lonnie Carter, Walter Jacobs)
5. "You Don't Have to Ask" (Garcia, Weir, McKernan, Lesh, Kreutzmann)

Side B

1. "Big Boss Man" (Al Smith, Luther Dixon)
2. "Stealin'" (Gus Cannon, arranged by Grateful Dead)
3. "Cardboard Cowboy" (Lesh)
4. "It's All Over Now, Baby Blue" (Bob Dylan)
5. "Cream Puff War" (Garcia)

Side C

1. "Viola Lee Blues" (Noah Lewis)
2. "Beat It On Down the Line" (Jesse Fuller)
3. "Good Morning Little Schoolgirl" (Sonny Boy Williamson)

Side D

July 30, 1966 bonus tracks:

1. "Cold Rain and Snow" (traditional, arranged by Garcia, Weir, McKernan, Lesh)
2. "One Kind Favor" (Jules Bihari, Lightnin' Hopkins)
3. "Hey Little One" (Dorsey Burnette, Barry De Vorzon)
4. "New, New Minglewood Blues" (Garcia, Weir, McKernan, Lesh, Kreutzmann)

== Personnel ==
Grateful Dead

- Jerry Garcia – guitar, vocals
- Bill Kreutzmann – drums
- Phil Lesh – bass, vocals
- Ron "Pigpen" McKernan – organ, harmonica, vocals
- Bob Weir – guitar, vocals

Production

- Produced by Grateful Dead
- Produced for release by David Lemieux
- Executive producer – Mark Pinkus
- Associate producers – Doran Tyson, Ivette Ramos
- Tape research – Michael Wesley Johnson
- Recording – Owsley Stanley
- Mastering – Jeffrey Norman
- Lacquer cutting – Chris Bellman
- Cover art – Bob Masse
- Photos – Bob Chevalier
- Art direction, design – Steve Vance
