= Red Rocks: 7/8/78 =

Live album by Grateful Dead
- Released: May 13, 2016
- Recorded: July 8, 1978
- Venues: Red Rocks Amphitheatre; Morrison, Colorado
- Genre: Rock
- Length: 170:08
- Label: Rhino
- Producer: Grateful Dead

Grateful Dead chronology
| Dave's Picks Volume 18 (2016) | Red Rocks: 7/8/78 (2016) | July 1978: The Complete Recordings (2016) |

Red Rocks: 7/8/78 is a three-CD live album by the rock band the Grateful Dead. It was recorded on July 8, 1978, at Red Rocks Amphitheatre in Morrison, Colorado. It was released on May 13, 2016. The same concert was also released as part of the box set July 1978: The Complete Recordings.

== Critical reception ==
Professional ratings
Review scores
| Source | Rating |
|---|---|
| AllMusic | 4.5/5 stars |

Stephen Thomas Erlewine, writing on AllMusic, said, "If any Dead show could be called a full-on party — when they get to the concert-closing "Werewolves of London", it feels like a triumph — it's this, and while the good times are infectious, what lingers is how the band is exceptionally tight on this night. Whether they're boogying to blues and rock & roll or stretching to the edge of space, everybody feels in sync and the results are exhilarating."

== Track listing ==
Disc 1
First set:

1. "Bertha" > (Jerry Garcia, Robert Hunter) – 6:43
2. "Good Lovin'" (Rudy Clark, Artie Resnick) – 6:40
3. "Dire Wolf" (Garcia, Hunter) – 4:07
4. "El Paso" (Marty Robbins) – 4:24
5. "It Must Have Been the Roses" (Hunter) – 7:16
6. "New Minglewood Blues" (traditional, arranged by Grateful Dead) – 6:09
7. "Ramble On Rose" (Garcia, Hunter) – 8:34
8. "Promised Land" (Chuck Berry) – 4:37
9. "Deal" (Garcia, Hunter) – 6:26

Second set:

10. "Samson and Delilah" (traditional, arranged by Grateful Dead) – 7:44
11. "Ship of Fools" (Garcia, Hunter) – 7:29

Disc 2

1. "Estimated Prophet" > (Bob Weir, John Barlow) – 13:08
2. "The Other One" > (Weir, Bill Kreutzmann) – 8:51
3. "Eyes of the World" > (Garcia, Hunter) – 10:34
4. "Rhythm Devils" > (Mickey Hart, Kreutzmann) – 10:29
5. "Space" > (Garcia, Phil Lesh, Weir) – 5:03
6. "Wharf Rat" > (Garcia, Hunter) – 8:43
7. "Franklin's Tower" > (Garcia, Kreutzmann, Hunter) – 10:38
8. "Sugar Magnolia" (Weir, Hunter) – 9:31

Disc 3
Encore:

1. "Terrapin Station" > (Garcia, Hunter) – 10:54
2. "One More Saturday Night" (Weir) – 5:13
3. "Werewolves of London" (LeRoy Marinell, Waddy Wachtel, Warren Zevon) – 6:44

== Personnel ==
Grateful Dead

- Jerry Garcia – guitar, vocals
- Donna Jean Godchaux – vocals
- Keith Godchaux – keyboards, vocals
- Mickey Hart – drums
- Bill Kreutzmann – drums
- Phil Lesh – bass
- Bob Weir – guitar, vocals

Production

- Produced by Grateful Dead
- Produced for release by David Lemieux
- Executive producer: Mark Pinkus
- Associate producers: Doran Tyson, Ivette Ramos
- Rhino legal: Patti Coleman
- Recording: Betty Cantor-Jackson
- Tape restoration: Rob Eaton
- Mastering: Jeffrey Norman
- Tape-to-digital transfer: John K. Chester, Jamie Howarth
- Art direction, design: Steve Vance, Doran Tyson
- Artwork: Paul Pope
- Photos: Keith Stieduhar
- Tape research: Michael Wesley Johnson
- Archival research: Nicholas Meriwether
- Liner notes: David Lemieux

== Charts ==
| Chart (2016) | Peak position |
|---|---|
| US Billboard 200 | 177 |
