= Dave's Picks Volume 17 =

Live album by Grateful Dead
- Released: February 1, 2016
- Recorded: July 19, 1974
- Venue: Selland Arena, Fresno, California, USA
- Genre: Rock
- Length: 197:29
- Label: Rhino
- Producer: Grateful Dead

Grateful Dead chronology
Shrine Exposition Hall, Los Angeles, CA 11/10/1967 (2016)	Dave's Picks Volume 17 (2016)	Capitol Theatre, Passaic, NJ, 4/25/77 (2016)

Dave's Picks Volume 17 is a three-CD live album by the rock band the Grateful Dead. It contains the complete concert recorded on July 19, 1974 at Selland Arena in Fresno, California. It was produced in a limited edition of 16,500 numbered copies, and released on February 1, 2016.

Each year a different person creates the album cover art for the Dave's Picks albums. For 2016 the designated artist was Justin Helton Depicted on the cover of Volume 17 are two skeletons and the band's Wall of Sound concert sound system.

== Critical reception ==
Professional ratings
Review scores
Source	Rating
AllMusic	4/5 stars

Stephen Thomas Erlewine, writing on AllMusic, said, "... the repertoire... doesn't distinguish this show as much as its muscular, elastic snap, where the band is equally eager to delve into funky murk and launch into outer space.... the real pleasure of the Fresno 1974 show is how it showcases everything the Dead could do at that moment—the burnished folk, the old-time rock & roll, the country and funk—and shows that the band was still finding ways to turn the whole thing inside out and back again."

== Track listing ==
Disc 1
First set:

1. "Bertha" (Jerry Garcia, Robert Hunter) – 6:33
2. "Mexicali Blues" (Bob Weir, John Barlow) – 4:06
3. "Deal" (Garcia, Hunter) – 4:55
4. "Beat It On Down the Line" (Jesse Fuller) – 3:45
5. "Row Jimmy" (Garcia, Hunter) – 8:20
6. "Me and Bobby McGee" (Kris Kristofferson, Fred Foster) – 6:28
7. "Scarlet Begonias" (Garcia, Hunter) – 8:52
8. "El Paso" (Marty Robbins) – 4:39
9. "Tennessee Jed" (Garcia, Hunter) – 7:54

Disc 2

1. "Playing in the Band" (Weir, Mickey Hart, Hunter) – 29:14

Interlude:

2. "Seastones" (Phil Lesh, Ned Lagin) – 15:13

Second set:

3. "Brown-Eyed Women" (Garcia, Hunter) – 5:11
4. "Me and My Uncle" (John Phillips) – 3:11
5. "It Must Have Been the Roses" (Hunter) – 5:54
6. "Jack Straw" (Weir, Hunter) – 5:28

Disc 3

1. "He's Gone" > (Garcia, Hunter) – 14:55
2. "U.S. Blues" (Garcia, Hunter) – 5:55
3. "Weather Report Suite" > – 18:47
  - "Prelude" (Weir)
  - "Part 1" (Weir, Eric Andersen)
  - "Let It Grow" (Weir, Barlow)
4. "Jam" > (Grateful Dead) – 9:35
5. "Eyes of the World" > (Garcia, Hunter) – 16:32
6. "China Doll" (Garcia, Hunter) – 6:33
7. "One More Saturday Night" (Weir) – 5:21

== Personnel ==
Grateful Dead

- Jerry Garcia – lead guitar, vocals
- Donna Jean Godchaux – vocals
- Keith Godchaux – keyboards
- Bill Kreutzmann – drums
- Phil Lesh – electric bass, vocals
- Bob Weir – rhythm guitar, vocals

Additional musicians

- Ned Lagin – synthesizer and electronic keyboards on "Seastones"

Production

- Produced by Grateful Dead
- Produced for release by David Lemieux
- Associate Producers: Doran Tyson & Ivette Ramos
- CD mastering: Jeffrey Norman
- Recording: Kidd Candelario
- Art direction, design: Steve Vance
- Cover art: Justin Helton
- Photos: Kirk West
- Liner notes: Nicholas G. Meriwether
