= Capitol Theatre, Passaic, NJ, 4/25/77 =

Live album by Grateful Dead
- Released: April 16, 2016
- Recorded: April 25, 1977
- Venue: Capitol Theatre; Passaic, New Jersey
- Genre: Rock
- Label: Rhino
- Producer: Grateful Dead

Grateful Dead chronology
| Dave's Picks Volume 17 (2016) | Capitol Theatre, Passaic, NJ, 4/25/77 (2016) | Dave's Picks Volume 18 (2016) |

Capitol Theatre, Passaic, NJ, 4/25/77 is a live album by the rock band the Grateful Dead. It contains the complete concert recorded at the Capitol Theatre in Passaic, New Jersey on April 25, 1977. It was produced as a four-disc vinyl LP, in a limited edition of 7,700 copies, and released on April 16, 2016, in conjunction with Record Store Day.

The same concert recording was also released in October 2015, as part of the 30 Trips Around the Sun box set.

== Track listing ==
Side 1
First set:

1. "New Minglewood Blues" (traditional, arranged by Grateful Dead) – 6:12
2. "Deal" (Jerry Garcia, Robert Hunter) – 5:41
3. "Mama Tried" (Merle Haggard) – 3:07
4. "They Love Each Other" (Garcia, Hunter) – 7:17

Side 2

1. "Looks Like Rain" (Bob Weir, John Barlow) – 8:33
2. "Peggy-O" (traditional, arranged by Grateful Dead) – 9:16

Side 3

1. "Lazy Lightning" > (Weir, Barlow) – 3:32
2. "Supplication" (Weir, Barlow) – 3:58
3. "Ship of Fools" (Garcia, Hunter) – 6:40
4. "Estimated Prophet" (Weir, Barlow) – 7:59

Side 4

1. "Brown-Eyed Women" (Garcia, Hunter) – 6:06
2. "The Music Never Stopped" (Weir, Barlow) – 6:46

Encore:

3. "U.S. Blues" (Garcia, Hunter) – 6:33

Side 5
Second set:

1. "Scarlet Begonias" > (Garcia, Hunter) – 8:52
2. "Fire on the Mountain" (Mickey Hart, Hunter) – 11:08

Side 6

1. "Samson and Delilah" (traditional, arranged by Grateful Dead) – 7:55
2. "Terrapin Station" (Garcia, Hunter) – 9:37

Side 7

1. "Playing in the Band" > (Weir, Hart, Hunter) – 9:23
2. "Drums" (Hart, Bill Kreutzmann) – 4:12

Side 8

1. "Wharf Rat" > (Garcia, Hunter) – 17:34
2. "Playing in the Band" (Weir, Hart, Hunter) – 3:31

== Personnel ==
Grateful Dead

- Jerry Garcia – guitar, vocals
- Donna Jean Godchaux – vocals
- Keith Godchaux – keyboards
- Mickey Hart – drums
- Bill Kreutzmann – drums
- Phil Lesh – electric bass
- Bob Weir – guitar, vocals

Production

- Produced by Grateful Dead
- Produced for release by David Lemieux
- Executive producer: Mark Pinkus
- Associate producers: Doran Tyson, Ivette Ramos
- Recording: Betty Cantor-Jackson
- Mastering: David Glasser
- Tape-to-digital transfers: John K. Chester, Jamie Howarth
- Lacquer cutting: Chris Bellman
- Cover illustration: Tony Millionaire
- Art direction, design: Steve Vance
- Tape research: Michael Wesley Johnson
- Archival research: Nicholas Meriwether
