= July 1978: The Complete Recordings =

Live album and box set by Grateful Dead
- Released: May 13, 2016
- Recorded: July 1–8, 1978
- Genre: Rock
- Length: 744:51
- Label: Rhino
- Producer: Grateful Dead

Grateful Dead chronology
Red Rocks: 7/8/78 (2016)	July 1978: The Complete Recordings (2016)	Dave's Picks Volume 19 (2016)

Grateful Dead concert box set chronology
30 Trips Around the Sun (2015)	July 1978: The Complete Recordings (2016)	May 1977: Get Shown the Light (2017)

July 1978: The Complete Recordings is a live album by the rock band the Grateful Dead. Packaged as a box set, and produced as a limited edition of 15,000 copies, it contains five complete concerts on twelve CDs. It was released on May 13, 2016.

July 7, 1978 was the band's first appearance at Colorado's Red Rocks Amphitheatre (there were actually four dates in succession at the venue, with the band taking a seven-week break halfway in between for the recording of Shakedown Street). They played annual runs at Red Rocks through 1987, missing only 1980, 1981, and 1986. An additional date was originally scheduled for Milwaukee Summerfest, on July 2, but had to be cancelled. Though relatively short, this is the third complete tour to be officially released by the band, following the twenty two-date tour of Western Europe in 1972, and the sixteen-date winter / spring 1990 tour of the eastern United States.

The concerts were recorded by audio engineer Betty Cantor-Jackson. They are among a number of soundboard recordings by Cantor-Jackson – known as "Betty boards" — that were long missing from the Grateful Dead's vault of concert recordings. The tapes eventually were returned to the band, and production of the album began some months later.

== Concerts ==
The album includes all five of the band's July 1978 concerts.

- July 1, 1978 – Arrowhead Stadium, Kansas City, Missouri
- July 3, 1978 – St. Paul Civic Center Arena, Saint Paul, Minnesota
- July 5, 1978 – Omaha Civic Auditorium, Omaha, Nebraska
- July 7, 1978 – Red Rocks Amphitheatre, Morrison, Colorado
- July 8, 1978 – Red Rocks Amphitheatre, Morrison, Colorado

== Track listing ==
=== July 1, 1978 – Arrowhead Stadium, Kansas City, Missouri ===
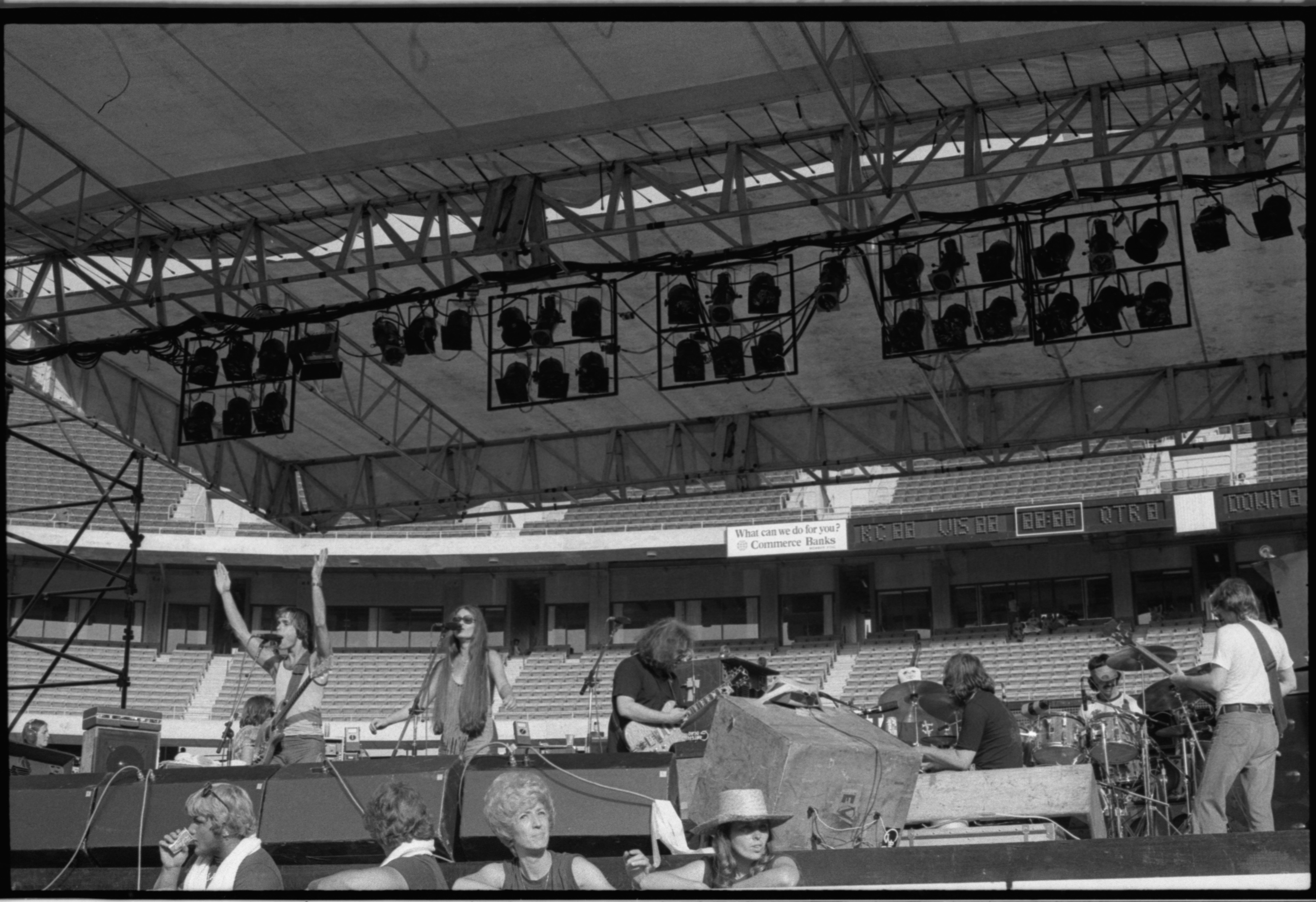
The Grateful Dead performing the July 1 concert in Kansas City

Disc 1

1. "Bertha" > (Jerry Garcia, Robert Hunter) – 7:02
2. "Good Lovin'" (Arthur Resnick, Rudy Clark) – 6:30
3. "Tennessee Jed" (Garcia, Hunter) – 8:49
4. "Jack Straw" (Bob Weir, Hunter) – 6:03
5. "Friend of the Devil" (Garcia, John Dawson, Hunter) – 8:20
6. "Me and My Uncle" > (John Phillips) – 2:56
7. "Big River" (Johnny Cash) – 5:16

Disc 2

1. "Terrapin Station" > (Garcia, Hunter, Kreutzmann, Hart) – 11:01
2. "Playing in the Band" > (Weir, Mickey Hart, Hunter) – 8:56
3. "Rhythm Devils" > (Hart, Bill Kreutzmann) – 8:51
4. "Space" > (Garcia, Phil Lesh, Weir, Keith Godchaux) – 3:51
5. "Estimated Prophet" > (Weir, John Barlow) – 11:05
6. "The Other One" > (Weir, Kreutzmann) – 5:13
7. "Wharf Rat" > (Garcia, Hunter) – 10:01
8. "Around and Around" (Chuck Berry) – 8:25

Encore:

9. "Johnny B. Goode" (Berry) – 4:15

Note: The Dead played one set on this date, as part of Willie Nelson's annual 4th of July Picnic.

=== July 3, 1978 – St. Paul Civic Center Arena, St. Paul, Minnesota ===
Disc 1

First set:

1. "New Minglewood Blues" (Traditional) – 5:40
2. "Loser" (Garcia, Hunter) – 7:35
3. "Looks Like Rain" (Weir, Barlow) – 7:51
4. "Ramble On Rose" (Garcia, Hunter) – 7:25
5. Mexicali Blues" > (Weir, Barlow) – 3:26
6. "Mama Tried" (Merle Haggard) – 3:24
7. "Peggy-O" (traditional, arranged by Grateful Dead) – 8:09
8. "Cassidy" (Weir, Barlow) – 5:08
9. "Deal" > (Garcia, Hunter) – 6:13
10. "The Music Never Stopped" (Weir, Barlow) – 8:20

Disc 2

Second set:

1. "Scarlet Begonias" > (Garcia, Hunter) – 10:16
2. "Fire on the Mountain" (Hart, Hunter) – 9:39
3. "Dancing in the Street" > (Marvin Gaye, Ivy Jo Hunter, William "Mickey" Stevenson) – 13:32
4. "Rhythm Devils" > (Hart, Kreutzmann) – 11:10
5. "Not Fade Away" > (Charles Hardin, Norman Petty) – 6:46
6. "Stella Blue" > (Garcia, Hunter) – 10:51
7. "Sugar Magnolia" (Weir, Hunter) – 9:19

Encore:

8. "Werewolves of London" (LeRoy Marinell, Waddy Wachtel, Warren Zevon) – 7:12

=== July 5, 1978 – Omaha Civic Auditorium, Omaha, Nebraska ===
Disc 1

First set:

1. "Sugaree" (Garcia, Hunter) –9:51
2. "Beat It On Down the Line" (Jesse Fuller) – 3:28
3. "They Love Each Other" (Garcia, Hunter) – 7:12
4. "Looks Like Rain" (Weir, Barlow) – 7:59
5. "Dire Wolf" (Garcia, Hunter) – 3:49
6. "It's All Over Now" (Bobby Womack, Shirley Womack) – 8:22
7. "Candyman" (Hunter, Garcia) – 6:41
8. "Lazy Lightning" > (Weir, Barlow) – 3:27
9. "Supplication" (Weir, Barlow) –5:27

Second set:

10. "Deal" (Garcia, Hunter) – 6:13
11. "Samson and Delilah" (traditional, arranged by Grateful Dead) – 7:08
12. "Ship of Fools" (Garcia, Hunter) – 7:41

Disc 2

1. "Estimated Prophet" > (Weir, Barlow) – 12:42
2. "Eyes of the World" > (Garcia, Hunter) – 12:23
3. "Rhythm Devils" > (Hart, Kreutzmann) – 7:56
4. "Space" > (Garcia, Lesh, Weir, Godchaux) – 7:28
5. "Wharf Rat" > (Garcia, Hunter) – 9:43
6. "Truckin'" > (Garcia, Lesh, Weir, Hunter) – 7:29
7. "Iko Iko" > (James "Sugar Boy" Crawford, Barbara Ann Hawkins, Rosa Lee Hawkins, Joan Marie Johnson) – 7:23
8. "Around and Around" (Berry) – 8:27

Encore:

9. "Promised Land" (Chuck Berry) – 4:13

=== July 7, 1978 – Red Rocks Amphitheatre, Morrison, Colorado ===
Disc 1

First set:

1. "Jack Straw" (Bob Weir, Hunter) – 5:49
2. "Candyman" (Hunter, Garcia) – 6:41
3. "Me and My Uncle" > (John Phillips) – 3:00
4. "Big River" (Johnny Cash) – 5:53
5. "Friend of the Devil" (Garcia, John Dawson, Hunter) – 8:36
6. "Cassidy" (Weir, Barlow) – 5:06
7. "Tennessee Jed" (Garcia, Hunter) – 9:11
8. "Passenger" (Lesh, Peter Monk) – 5:31
9. "Peggy-O" (traditional, arranged by Grateful Dead) – 9:10
10. "The Music Never Stopped" (Weir, Barlow) – 8:13

Disc 2

Second set:

1. "Cold Rain and Snow" (traditional, arranged by Grateful Dead) – 7:26
2. "Beat It On Down the Line" (Jesse Fuller) – 3:38
3. "Scarlet Begonias" > (Garcia, Hunter) – 10:18
4. "Fire on the Mountain" (Hart, Hunter) – 8:10

Disc 3

1. "Dancing in the Street" > (Gaye, Hunter, Stevenson) – 8:57
2. "Rhythm Devils" > (Hart, Kreutzmann) – 10:12
3. "Space" > (Garcia, Lesh, Weir, Godchaux) – 6:09
4. "Not Fade Away" > (Charles Hardin, Norman Petty) – 11:04
5. "Black Peter" > (Garcia, Hunter) – 10:29
6. "Around and Around" (Berry) – 8:44

Encore:

7. "U.S. Blues" (Garcia, Hunter) – 5:55
8. "Johnny B. Goode" (Berry) – 4:16

=== July 8, 1978 – Red Rocks Amphitheatre, Morrison, Colorado ===
Disc 1

First set:

1. "Bertha" > (Jerry Garcia, Robert Hunter) > – 6:43
2. "Good Lovin'" (Resnick, Clark) – 6:40
3. "Dire Wolf" (Garcia, Hunter) – 4:07
4. "El Paso" (Marty Robbins) – 4:25
5. "It Must Have Been the Roses" (Hunter) – 7:16
6. "New Minglewood Blues" (traditional, arranged by Grateful Dead) – 6:09
7. "Ramble On Rose" (Garcia, Hunter) – 8:34
8. "Promised Land" (Chuck Berry) – 4:37
9. "Deal" (Garcia, Hunter) – 6:26

Second set:

10. "Samson and Delilah" (traditional, arranged by Grateful Dead) – 7:44
11. "Ship of Fools" (Garcia, Hunter) – 7:45

Disc 2

1. "Estimated Prophet" > (Weir, Barlow) – 13:08
2. "The Other One" > (Weir, Kreutzmann) – 8:51
3. "Eyes of the World" > (Garcia, Hunter) – 10:34
4. "Rhythm Devils" > (Hart, Kreutzmann) – 10:29
5. "Space" > (Garcia, Godchaux, Lesh, Weir) – 5:03
6. "Wharf Rat" > (Garcia, Hunter) – 8:43
7. "Franklin's Tower" > (Garcia, Hunter, Kreutzmann) – 10:39
8. "Sugar Magnolia" (Weir, Hunter) – 9:31

Disc 3

Encore:

1. "Terrapin Station" > (Garcia, Hunter, Kreutzmann, Hart) – 10:48
2. "One More Saturday Night" (Weir) – 5:13
3. "Werewolves of London" (Marinell, Wachtel, Zevon) – 6:44

Note: This show was simultaneously released as a stand-alone edition.

== Personnel ==
Grateful Dead

- Jerry Garcia – guitar, vocals
- Donna Jean Godchaux – vocals
- Keith Godchaux – keyboards
- Mickey Hart – drums
- Bill Kreutzmann – drums
- Phil Lesh – bass
- Bob Weir – guitar, vocals

Production

- Produced by Grateful Dead
- Produced for release by David Lemieux
- Mastering: Jeffrey Norman
- Recording: Betty Cantor-Jackson
- Art direction, design: Steve Vance
- Cover art: Paul Pope
- Liner notes: Nicholas Meriwether, David Lemieux

== Charts ==
Chart (2016)	Peak position
US Billboard 200	62
