= Dave's Picks Volume 20 =

Live album by Grateful Dead
- Released: November 1, 2016
- Recorded: December 9, 1981
- Venue: CU Events Center; Boulder, Colorado
- Genre: Rock
- Length: 182:07
- Label: Rhino
- Producer: Grateful Dead

Grateful Dead chronology
Dave's Picks Volume 19 (2016)	Dave's Picks Volume 20 (2016)	Dave's Picks Volume 21 (2017)

Dave's Picks Volume 20 is a three-CD live album by the rock band the Grateful Dead. It contains the complete concert recorded on December 9, 1981, at the CU Events Center in Boulder, Colorado. It was produced as a limited edition of 16,500 copies, and was released on November 1, 2016. The album art is by Justin Helton, featuring a skeleton riding a bike (a nod to Boulder's bicycle culture) with the iconic Flatirons in the background.

The album was the first one of the Dave's Picks series that was recorded after 1980. It was also the first Grateful Dead album that included the Rolling Stones' song "Satisfaction".

== Critical reception ==
In All About Jazz, Doug Collette wrote, "A little over a year after the Grateful Dead began a concerted effort to change things up for themselves and their audience with extended sojourns at the Warfield Theatre in San Francisco and Radio City Music Hall in New York, the group took residence ten-night run from whence this climax comes at the CU Events Center in Boulder. Well on the way to becoming more stylized than spontaneous, the band's comfort with themselves at this juncture in their career didn't preclude more than a little imagination and much of it was centered on keyboardist Brent Mydland, who had joined the band two years prior."

== Track listing ==
Disc 1
First set:

1. "Cold Rain and Snow" (traditional, arranged by Grateful Dead) – 6:38
2. "Jack Straw" (Bob Weir, Robert Hunter) – 6:26
3. "Friend of the Devil" > (Jerry Garcia, John Dawson, Hunter) – 8:10
4. "Little Red Rooster" (Willie Dixon) – 8:48
5. "Bird Song" (Garcia, Hunter) – 9:01
6. "Mama Tried" > (Merle Haggard) – 3:10
7. "Mexicali Blues" (Weir, John Perry Barlow) – 5:15
8. "Candyman" (Garcia, Hunter) – 6:11
9. "Cassidy" (Weir, Barlow) – 6:16
10. "Looks Like Rain" (Weir, Barlow) – 8:11

Disc 2

1. "China Cat Sunflower" > (Garcia, Hunter) – 6:01
2. "I Know You Rider" (traditional, arranged by Grateful Dead) – 6:31

Second set:

3. "Scarlet Begonias" > (Garcia, Hunter) – 10:27
4. "Fire on the Mountain" (Mickey Hart, Hunter) – 8:44
5. "Estimated Prophet" > (Weir, Barlow) – 10:31
6. "He's Gone" > (Garcia, Hunter) – 14:53
7. "Drums" > (Hart, Bill Kreutzmann) – 6:16
8. "Space" (Garcia, Phil Lesh, Weir) – 9:37

Disc 3

1. "The Other One" > (Weir, Kreutzmann) – 7:40
2. "Stella Blue" > (Garcia, Hunter) – 9:31
3. "Around and Around" > (Chuck Berry) – 3:40
4. "Good Lovin'" (Rudy Clark, Arthur Resnick) – 9:23

Encore:

5. "U.S. Blues" > (Garcia, Hunter) – 4:59
6. "(I Can't Get No) Satisfaction" (Mick Jagger, Keith Richards) – 6:31

== Personnel ==
Grateful Dead

- Jerry Garcia – guitar, vocals
- Mickey Hart – drums
- Bill Kreutzmann – drums
- Phil Lesh – bass
- Brent Mydland – keyboards, vocals
- Bob Weir – guitar, vocals

Production

- Grateful Dead – producers
- David Lemieux – producer for release
- Associate Producers: Doran Tyson & Ivette Ramos
- Jeffrey Norman – mastering
- Dan Healy – recording
- Steve Vance – art direction and design
- Justin Helton – cover art
- Bob Minkin – photos
- Nicholas G. Meriwether – liner notes essay ("Big Questions, Big Answers: The Dead in the Reagan '80s")

== Charts ==
Chart (2016)	Peak position
US Billboard 200	39
