= Mt. Falcon =

A mountain in Colorado

Mount Falcon

Highest point
- Elevation: 7,851ft (2,393 meters).
- Coordinates: 39°37′46″N 105°13′50″W

Geography
- Location: Jefferson County, Colorado
- Parent range: Front range

Mount (Mt.) Falcon is a mountain in Jefferson County, Colorado. Containing the ruins of John Brisben Walker's castle, the mountain is located within Mount Falcon Park, and is known for its proximity to Red Rocks Amphitheatre.

The peak has an elevation of 7,851 feet (2,393 meters).
