= All the Years Combine: The DVD Collection =

- Box set cover
- Music by: Grateful Dead
- Distributed by: Shout! Factory
- Release date: April 17, 2012

All the Years Combine: The DVD Collection is a box set of videos by the rock band the Grateful Dead. It contains 14 DVDs, comprising 12 previously released titles plus bonus material. It also includes a 40-page booklet of liner notes, essays, and photos. It was released by Shout! Factory on April 17, 2012.

== Disc listing ==
All the Years Combine: The DVD Collection contains the following DVDs:

1. The Grateful Dead Movie, disc 1 – A theatrically released film, with principal photography from October 16 – 20, 1974 at the Winterland Ballroom in San Francisco.
2. The Grateful Dead Movie, disc 2 – Bonus material from the DVD release of the film.
3. The Closing of Winterland, disc 1 – The first and second sets of the December 31, 1978, concert at Winterland.
4. The Closing of Winterland, disc 2 – The third set of the December 31, 1978, concert, plus bonus material.
5. Dead Ahead – Electric and acoustic music performed live at Radio City Music Hall in New York City on October 30 and 31, 1980.
6. So Far – A music documentary co-directed by Jerry Garcia, with principal photography from 1985.
7. Ticket to New Year's – Most of the December 31, 1987, concert at the Oakland Coliseum Arena in Oakland.
8. Truckin' Up to Buffalo – The July 4, 1989, concert at Rich Stadium in Orchard Park, New York.
9. Downhill from Here – The July 17, 1989, concert at Alpine Valley Music Theatre near East Troy, Wisconsin.
10. View from the Vault – The July 8, 1990, concert at Three Rivers Stadium in Pittsburgh.
11. View from the Vault II – The June 14, 1991, concert at Robert F. Kennedy Stadium in Washington, D.C.
12. View from the Vault III – The June 16, 1990, concert at Shoreline Amphitheatre in Mountain View, California.
13. View from the Vault IV – The concerts performed on July 24, 1987, at Oakland Coliseum Stadium in Oakland, California, and on July 26, 1987, at Anaheim Stadium in Anaheim, California.
14. Bonus disc:

- Songs from five live performances, previously unreleased.
- Backstage Pass, a 35-minute music documentary directed by Justin Kreutzmann, the son of Bill Kreutzmann, with principal photography from 1992.
- An interview with music and video archivist David Lemieux, previously unreleased.
