= Summer Magic 1985 =

Live album and box set by Grateful Dead
- Released: September 18, 2026
- Recorded: June 14–July 1, 1985
- Label: Rhino

Grateful Dead chronology
Dave's Picks Volume 59 (2026)	Summer Magic 1985 (2026)	Merriweather 6/30/85 (2026)

Grateful Dead concert box set chronology
Enjoying the Ride (2025)	Summer Magic 1985 (2026)

Summer Magic 1985 is a live box set by the American rock band Grateful Dead, released on September 18, 2026 by Rhino Entertainment.

== Contents ==
Summer Magic 1985 is a 20-CD box set of seven complete concerts recorded from June 14 to July 1, 1985, including their three 20th anniversary shows on June 14, 15, and 16. The box set includes a show recorded at Merriweather Post Pavilion on June 30 that was released as a separate album called Merriweather 6/30/85. It also contains a 96-page book featuring an essay written by Nicholas G. Meriwether and longtime Grateful Dead archivist David Lemieux. It was produced in a limited edition of 10,000 copies.

Lemieux has stated before that the performance of "Shakedown Street" from the June 30 show is "widely considered one of the greatest single performances of any song by the Grateful Dead, up there with '[Morning] Dew' from Europe '72, 'Viola Lee Blues' from Harpur College, and 'Eyes of the World' from 3/29/90."

== Concerts ==
Summer Magic 1985 contains recordings of these concerts:

- June 14, 1985 – Greek Theatre, Berkeley, California
- June 15, 1985 – Greek Theatre, Berkeley, California
- June 16, 1985 – Greek Theatre, Berkeley, California
- June 27, 1985 – Saratoga Performing Arts Center, Saratoga Springs, New York
- June 28, 1985 – Hershey Park Stadium, Hershey, Pennsylvania
- June 30, 1985 – Merriweather Post Pavilion, Columbia, Maryland
- July 1, 1985 – Merriweather Post Pavilion, Columbia, Maryland

== Personnel ==
Grateful Dead

- Jerry Garcia – guitar, vocals
- Bob Weir – guitar, vocals
- Brent Mydland – keyboards, vocals
- Phil Lesh – bass, vocals
- Bill Kreutzmann – drums
- Mickey Hart – drums

Production

- Produced for release by David Lemieux
- Recording: Dan Healy
- Mastering: David Glasser
- Art origination: Marcos Alvarado
- Design: Pablo Valdes, Steve Vance

== Track listing ==
=== June 14, 1985 – Greek Theatre, Berkeley, California ===
Disc 1

First set:

1. "Dancing in the Street" (William Stevenson, Marvin Gaye, Ivy Jo Hunter)
2. "West L.A. Fadeaway" (Jerry Garcia, Robert Hunter)
3. "C.C. Rider" (traditional, arranged by Grateful Dead)
4. "Peggy-O" (traditional, arranged by Grateful Dead)
5. "Hell in a Bucket" (Bob Weir, Brent Mydland, John Perry Barlow)
6. "Keep On Growing" (Eric Clapton, Bobby Whitlock)
7. "Stagger Lee" (Garcia, Hunter)
8. "Let It Grow" > (Weir, Barlow)
9. "Deal" (Garcia, Hunter)

Encore:

10. "Keep Your Day Job" (Garcia, Hunter)

Disc 2

Second set:

1. Tuning fun
2. "Morning Dew" > (Bonnie Dobson, Tim Rose)
3. "Playing in the Band" > (Weir, Mickey Hart, Hunter)
4. "China Doll" > (Garcia, Hunter)
5. "Jam" > (Grateful Dead)
6. "Drums" > (Hart, Bill Kreutzmann)
7. "Space" > (Garcia, Phil Lesh, Weir)
8. "Truckin'" > (Garcia, Lesh, Weir, Hunter)
9. "Smokestack Lightning" > (Chester Burnett)
10. "Comes a Time" > (Garcia, Hunter)
11. "Sugar Magnolia" (Weir, Hunter)

=== June 15, 1985 – Greek Theatre, Berkeley, California ===
Disc 3

First set:

1. "Touch of Grey" (Garcia, Hunter)
2. "New Minglewood Blues" (traditional, arranged by Grateful Dead)
3. "Friend of the Devil" (Garcia, John Dawson, Hunter)
4. "Cassidy" (Weir, Barlow)
5. "Dupree's Diamond Blues" (Garcia, Hunter)
6. "Me and My Uncle" > (John Phillips)
7. "Big River" > (Johnny Cash)
8. "Might as Well" (Garcia, Hunter)

Disc 4

Second set:

1. "China Cat Sunflower" > (Garcia, Hunter)
2. "I Know You Rider" (traditional, arranged by Grateful Dead)
3. "Lost Sailor" > (Weir, Barlow)
4. "Saint of Circumstance" (Weir, Barlow)
5. "Terrapin Station" > (Garcia, Hunter)
6. "Drums" (Hart, Kreutzmann)

Disc 5

Second set, continued:

1. "Space" > (Garcia, Lesh, Weir)
2. "The Wheel" > (Garcia, Hunter)
3. "Gimme Some Lovin'" > (Spencer Davis, Steve Winwood, Muff Winwood)
4. "Throwing Stones" > (Weir, Barlow)
5. "Not Fade Away" (Norman Petty, Charles Hardin)

Encore:

6. "She Belongs to Me" (Bob Dylan)
7. "U.S. Blues" (Garcia, Hunter)

=== June 16, 1985 – Greek Theatre, Berkeley, California ===
Disc 6

First set:

1. "In the Midnight Hour" > (Wilson Pickett, Steve Cropper)
2. "Bertha" (Garcia, Hunter)
3. "Walkin' Blues" (Robert Johnson)
4. "Tennessee Jed" (Garcia, Hunter)
5. "My Brother Esau" (Weir, Barlow)
6. "Big Railroad Blues" (Noah Lewis)
7. "Looks Like Rain" (Weir, Barlow)
8. "Mississippi Half-Step Uptown Toodeloo" (Garcia, Hunter)
9. "Promised Land" (Chuck Berry)

Disc 7

Second set:

1. "Scarlet Begonias" > (Garcia, Hunter)
2. "Fire on the Mountain" (Hart, Hunter)
3. "Samson and Delilah" (traditional, arranged by Grateful Dead)
4. "That's It for the Other One" >
  - "Cryptical Envelopment" (Garcia)
  - "The Other One" (Weir, Kreutzmann)
  - "Cryptical Envelopment" (Garcia)
5. "Drums" (Hart, Kreutzmann)

Disc 8

Second set, continued:

1. "Space" > (Garcia, Lesh, Weir)
2. "Goin' Down the Road Feeling Bad" > (traditional, arranged by Grateful Dead)
3. "I Need a Miracle" > (Weir, Barlow)
4. "Wharf Rat" > (Garcia, Hunter)
5. "Turn On Your Lovelight" (Joseph Scott, Deadric Malone)

Encore:

6. "Brokedown Palace" (Garcia, Hunter)

=== June 27, 1985 – Saratoga Performing Arts Center, Saratoga Springs, New York ===
Disc 9

First set:

1. "In the Midnight Hour" > (Pickett, Cropper)
2. "Bertha" (Garcia, Hunter)
3. "Little Red Rooster" (Willie Dixon)
4. "Stagger Lee" (Garcia, Hunter)
5. "El Paso" (Marty Robbins)
6. "Crazy Fingers" > (Garcia, Hunter)
7. "Supplication Jam" > (Grateful Dead)
8. "High Time" (Garcia, Hunter)
9. "Hell in a Bucket" > (Weir, Mydland, Barlow)
10. "Don't Ease Me In" (traditional, arranged by Grateful Dead)

Disc 10

Second set:

1. "Feel Like a Stranger" > (Weir, Barlow)
2. "Eyes of the World" > (Garcia, Hunter)
3. "Goin' Down the Road Feeling Bad" > (traditional, arranged by Grateful Dead)
4. "Man Smart, Woman Smarter" > (Norman Span)
5. "Drums" (Hart, Kreutzmann)

Disc 11

Second set, continued:

1. "Space" > (Garcia, Lesh, Weir)
2. "Truckin'" > (Garcia, Lesh, Weir, Hunter)
3. "Spoonful" > (Dixon)
4. "Black Peter" > (Garcia, Hunter)
5. "Turn On Your Lovelight" (Scott, Malone)

Encore:

6. "Johnny B. Goode" > (Berry)
7. "It's All Over Now, Baby Blue" (Dylan)

=== June 28, 1985 – Hershey Park Stadium, Hershey, Pennsylvania ===
Disc 12

First set:

1. "Cold Rain and Snow" > (traditional, arranged by Grateful Dead)
2. "Promised Land" (Berry)
3. "Ramble On Rose" (Garcia, Hunter)
4. "I Ain't Superstitious" (Dixon) / "Down in the Bottom" > (Dixon)
5. "Bird Song" > (Garcia, Hunter)
6. "Comes a Time" > (Garcia, Hunter)
7. "Deal" (Garcia, Hunter)

Disc 13

Second set:

1. "The Music Never Stopped" (Weir, Barlow)
2. "Just Like Tom Thumb's Blues" (Dylan)
3. "Estimated Prophet" > (Weir, Barlow)
4. "Terrapin Station" > (Garcia, Hunter)
5. "Drums" (Hart, Kreutzmann)

Disc 14

Second set, continued:

1. "Space" > (Garcia, Lesh, Weir)
2. "I Need a Miracle" > (Weir, Barlow)
3. "Morning Dew" > (Dobson, Rose)
4. "Throwing Stones" > (Weir, Barlow)
5. "Not Fade Away" (Petty, Hardin)

Encore:

6. "Keep Your Day Job" (Garcia, Hunter)

=== June 30, 1985 – Merriweather Post Pavilion, Columbia, Maryland ===
Disc 15

First set:

1. "Mississippi Half-Step Uptown Toodeloo" > (Garcia, Hunter)
2. "C.C. Rider" > (traditional, arranged by Grateful Dead)
3. "Brown-Eyed Women" (Garcia, Hunter)
4. "Mama Tried" > (Merle Haggard)
5. "Mexicali Blues" (Weir, Barlow)
6. "Keep On Growing" (Clapton, Whitlock)
7. "Big Railroad Blues" (Lewis)
8. "Looks Like Rain" > (Weir, Barlow)
9. "Don't Ease Me In" (traditional, arranged by Grateful Dead)

Disc 16

Second set:

1. "Shakedown Street" > (Garcia, Hunter)
2. "Samson and Delilah" (traditional, arranged by Grateful Dead)
3. "Gimme Some Lovin'" > (Davis, S. Winwood, M. Winwood)
4. "He's Gone" > (Garcia, Hunter)
5. "Cryptical Envelopment" > (Garcia)
6. "Drums" (Hart, Kreutzmann)

Disc 17

Second set, continued:

1. "Space" > (Garcia, Lesh, Weir)
2. "The Other One" > (Weir, Kreutzmann)
3. "Stella Blue" > (Garcia, Hunter)
4. "Around and Around" > (Berry)
5. "Sugar Magnolia" (Weir, Hunter)

Encore:

6. "U.S. Blues" (Garcia, Hunter)

=== July 1, 1985 – Merriweather Post Pavilion, Columbia, Maryland ===
Disc 18

First set:

1. "Dancing in the Street" (Stevenson, Gaye, I.J. Hunter)
2. "Dupree's Diamond Blues" (Garcia, Hunter)
3. "Walkin' Blues" (Johnson)
4. "Jack-a-Roe" (traditional, arranged by Grateful Dead)
5. "My Brother Esau" (Weir, Barlow)
6. "Stagger Lee" (Garcia, Hunter)
7. "Let It Grow" > (Weir, Barlow)
8. "Keep Your Day Job" (Garcia, Hunter)

Disc 19

Second set:

1. "Scarlet Begonias" > (Garcia, Hunter)
2. "Fire on the Mountain" (Hart, Hunter)
3. "Playing in the Band" > (Weir, Hart, Hunter)
4. "Uncle John's Band" > (Garcia, Hunter)
5. "Drums" (Hart, Kreutzmann)

Disc 20

Second set, continued:

1. "Space" > (Garcia, Lesh, Weir)
2. "Dear Mr. Fantasy" > (Jim Capaldi, Chris Wood, Steve Winwood)
3. "Goin' Down the Road Feeling Bad" > (traditional, arranged by Grateful Dead)
4. "Good Lovin'" (Rudolph Clark, Arthur Resnick)

Encore:

5. "(I Can't Get No) Satisfaction" > (Mick Jagger, Keith Richards)
6. "It's All Over Now, Baby Blue" (Dylan)
