= View from the Vault III =

Live album / soundtrack by Grateful Dead
- Released: August 2002
- Recorded: June 16, 1990
- Genres: Jam; Folk rock Psychedelic rock
- Length: 202:46
- Label: Grateful Dead

Grateful Dead chronology
Steppin' Out with the Grateful Dead: England '72 (2002)	View from the Vault III (2002)	Dick's Picks Volume 26 (2002)

View from the Vault chronology
View from the Vault II (2001)	View from the Vault III (2002)	View from the Vault IV (2003)

Professional ratings
Review scores
Source	Rating
AllMusic	4/5 stars
The Music Box	4/5 stars
PopMatters	8/10 (Note: Joint rating with View from the Vault IV)
The Rolling Stone Album Guide	2/5 stars

View from the Vault III is the third release in the "View from the Vault" series by the Grateful Dead. It was released simultaneously as a three disc album on CD and as a concert performance video on DVD. It contains the June 16, 1990 show at the Shoreline Amphitheatre in Mountain View, California.

The album also includes six songs from a show at the same venue on October 3, 1987. One of these is "My Brother Esau", the first appearance of this song on an album in CD format. The studio version had been the B-side of the "Touch of Grey" single in 1987, appeared on the cassette version of the In the Dark album, and was later released on the Beyond Description box set (it was then appended to the 2004 reissue of In the Dark). Another track from October 3, 1987 ("Maggie's Farm") had been released earlier in the year on Postcards of the Hanging.

== Track listing ==
Disc one

First set:

1. "Let the Good Times Roll" (Sam Cooke) – 4:52 →
2. "Truckin'" (Jerry Garcia, Phil Lesh, Bob Weir, Robert Hunter) – 10:06 →
3. "Touch of Grey" (Garcia, Hunter) – 7:30
4. "Mama Tried" (Merle Haggard) – 2:35 →
5. "Big River" (Johnny Cash) – 5:52
6. "Friend of the Devil" (Garcia, John Dawson, Hunter) – 8:06
7. "Cassidy" (Weir, John Perry Barlow) – 6:21
8. "Big Boss Man" (Luther Dixon, Al Smith) – 7:24
9. "One More Saturday Night" (Weir) – 5:23

Disc two

Second set:

1. "China Cat Sunflower" (Garcia, Hunter) – 10:39 →
2. "I Know You Rider" (traditional, arr. Grateful Dead) – 5:44 →
3. "We Can Run" (Brent Mydland, Barlow) – 5:50
4. "Estimated Prophet" (Weir, Barlow) – 13:07 →
5. "Terrapin Station" (Garcia, Hunter) – 15:20 →
6. "Jam" (Grateful Dead) – 15:16 →
7. "Space" (Grateful Dead) - 11:49 →

Disc three

Second set, continued:

1. "Drums" (Mickey Hart, Bill Kreutzmann) – 4:12 →
2. "China Doll" (Garcia, Hunter) – 6:45 →
3. "Sugar Magnolia" (Weir, Hunter) – 9:57

Encore:

4. "It's All Over Now, Baby Blue" (Bob Dylan) – 7:37

October 3, 1987 – first set:

5. "Hey Pocky Way" (Joseph Modeliste, Arthur Neville, Leo Nocentelli, George Porter) – 6:17
6. "New Minglewood Blues" (Noah Lewis) – 7:36
7. "Candyman" (Garcia, Hunter) – 7:51
8. "When I Paint My Masterpiece" (Dylan) – 4:39
9. "West L.A. Fadeaway" (Garcia, Hunter) – 7:34
10. "My Brother Esau" (Weir, Barlow) – 4:26

Note: "Addams Family" tuning before "When I Paint My Masterpiece"

== Personnel ==
Grateful Dead

- Jerry Garcia – lead guitar, vocals
- Bob Weir – rhythm guitar, vocals
- Phil Lesh – bass guitar, vocals
- Brent Mydland – Hammond organ, keyboards, vocals
- Mickey Hart – drums, percussion
- Bill Kreutzmann – drums, percussion

Production

- Len Dell'Amico - director, co-producer
- Dan Healy – recording
- Jeffrey Norman – mastering
- David Lemieux – tape archivist
- Cassidy Law – album coordination
- Eileen Law – archival research
- Robert Minkin – package design
- Ken Friedman – photography

== See also ==
- View from the Vault
- View from the Vault II
- View from the Vault IV
