= View from the Vault IV =

Live album / soundtrack by Grateful Dead
- Released: April 8, 2003
- Recorded: July 24 and July 26, 1987
- Genres: Rock; Jam
- Length: 4:26:21
- Label: Grateful Dead

Grateful Dead chronology
Birth of the Dead (2003)	View from the Vault IV (2003)	Dick's Picks Volume 28 (2003)

View from the Vault chronology
View from the Vault III (2002)	View from the Vault IV (2003)

Professional ratings
Review scores
Source	Rating
Allmusic	4/5 stars
The Music Box	4/5 stars
PopMatters	8/10 (Note: Joint rating with View from the Vault III)

View from the Vault IV is the fourth release in the "View from the Vault" series of rock concert recordings by the Grateful Dead. Like the other entries in the series, it was released simultaneously on CD and as a DVD concert video. However, unlike the previous 3-CD volumes, View from the Vault IV is a 4-CD set. This volume contains selections from two consecutive shows in California — July 24, 1987, at Oakland Stadium, and July 26, 1987 at Anaheim Stadium.

These concerts were recorded during the Bob Dylan and the Grateful Dead 1987 Tour. On this brief tour, the Grateful Dead played two sets followed by a performance by Bob Dylan, with the Dead providing his accompaniment (some of those performances are documented on the album Dylan & the Dead). All four Dead sets from these two dates are included in the release, but the sets with Dylan are not. Also not included are the "Touch of Grey" encores the Dead played both nights with Dylan on guitar (followed by an additional Dylan song). Additionally, the CD version includes "Friend of the Devil", "Me & My Uncle", and "Big River", which do not appear on the DVD.

View from the Vault IV was the first "View from the Vault" that was not also released on VHS videotape. It was the first DVD of the series that included the option of either a two-channel stereo or a Dolby 5.1 channel surround sound soundtrack. It was the final title in the "View from the Vault" series, and was followed eight months later by The Closing of Winterland DVD/CD set.

== Content ==
View From The Vault is the fourth installment in the View from the Vault series. It is also the longest one, with four discs. The concerts were part of the Apart and Together Tour, commonly known as the Dylan & The Dead tour. There would be three sets to each show. The first two sets would be like any other Grateful Dead concert, and the third would be with Bob Dylan. The album has only the Grateful Dead's sets from these shows.

== Reception ==
The two shows, especially the latter one, have been highly regarded. They are considered some of the best shows of 1987. It has gotten positive ratings from critics.

== Track listing ==
July 24, 1987 – Oakland Stadium, Oakland, California

Disc one
First set:

1. "Funiculi Funicula" (Luigi Denza) – 3:52
2. "Jack Straw" (Bob Weir, Robert Hunter) - 5:59
3. "Mississippi Half-Step Uptown Toodeloo" (Jerry Garcia, Hunter) - 9:30
4. "My Brother Esau" (Weir, John Barlow) - 5:01
5. "Friend Of The Devil" (Garcia, John Dawson, Hunter) - 9:06
6. "Me & My Uncle" > (John Phillips) - 3:08
7. "Big River" (Johnny Cash) - 6:07
8. "When Push Comes To Shove" (Garcia, Hunter) - 5:26
9. "Far From Me" (Brent Mydland) - 4:24
10. "Cassidy" > (Weir, Barlow) - 6:57
11. "Deal" (Garcia, Hunter) - 7:57

Disc two
Second set:

1. "Hell in a Bucket" > (Weir, Barlow) - 5:58
2. "Scarlet Begonias" (Garcia, Hunter) - 7:36
3. "Playing In The Band" > (Weir, Mickey Hart, Hunter) - 10:46
4. "Drums" > (Bill Kreutzmann, Hart) - 7:01
5. "Space" > (Grateful Dead) - 5:49
6. "Uncle John's Band" > (Garcia, Hunter) - 7:17
7. "Dear Mr. Fantasy" > (Jim Capaldi, Steve Winwood, Chris Wood) - 6:26
8. "I Need A Miracle" > (Weir, Barlow) - 3:35
9. "Bertha" > (Garcia, Hunter) - 7:01
10. "Sugar Magnolia" (Weir, Hunter) - 9:22

July 26, 1987 – Anaheim Stadium, Anaheim, California

Disc three
First set:

1. "Iko Iko" (James Crawford) - 6:36
2. "New Minglewood Blues" (Noah Lewis) - 7:53
3. "Tons of Steel" (Mydland) - 5:36
4. "West L.A. Fadeaway" (Garcia, Hunter) - 7:48
5. "When I Paint My Masterpiece" > (Bob Dylan) - 3:45
6. "Mexicali Blues" (Weir, Barlow) - 4:51
7. "Bird Song" > (Garcia, Hunter) - 8:41
8. "Promised Land" (Chuck Berry) - 4:26

Disc four
Second set:

1. "Shakedown Street" > (Garcia, Hunter) - 12:23
2. "Looks Like Rain" > (Weir, Barlow) - 8:23
3. "Terrapin Station" > (Garcia, Hunter) - 11:47
4. "Drums" > (Kreutzmann, Hart) - 8:36
5. "Space" > (Grateful Dead) - 6:23
6. "The Other One" > (Weir, Kreutzmann) - 6:47
7. "Stella Blue" > (Garcia, Hunter) - 7:12
8. "Throwing Stones" > (Weir, Barlow) - 8:48
9. "Not Fade Away" (Buddy Holly, Norman Petty) - 7:51

Notes:

- "Funiculi Funicula" also contains "Tico-Tico no Fubá"
- "Friend of the Devil", "Me and My Uncle" and "Big River" do not appear on the DVD
- "Iko Iko" appeared on a 2013 Record Store Day split 7" single featuring the Grateful Dead, The Dixie Cups and Dr. John performing separate renditions of the song
- "Drums" and "Space" are edited on the DVD
- "Throwing Stones" also appears on Weir Here (2004)

== Personnel ==
Grateful Dead

- Jerry Garcia – guitar, vocals
- Bob Weir – guitar, vocals
- Phil Lesh – bass, vocals
- Brent Mydland – keyboards, vocals
- Bill Kreutzmann – drums, percussion
- Mickey Hart – drums, percussion

Production

- Len Dell'Amico – director, co-producer
- John Cutler – recording
- Jeffrey Norman – CD mastering
- David Lemieux – tape archivist
- Cassidy Law – album coordination
- Eileen Law – archival research
- Robert Minkin – package design
- Ken Friedman – photograph

== See also ==
- View from the Vault
- View from the Vault II
- View from the Vault III
