= Nightfall of Diamonds =

Live album by Grateful Dead
- Released: September 25, 2001
- Recorded: October 16, 1989
- Venue: Meadowlands Arena (East Rutherford)
- Genres: Folk rock, psychedelic rock, jam
- Length: 140:39
- Label: Grateful Dead Records

Grateful Dead chronology
View from the Vault II (2001)	Nightfall of Diamonds (2001)	Dick's Picks Volume 23 (2001)

Professional ratings
Review scores
Source	Rating
Allmusic	4.5/5 stars
The Music Box	4.5/5 stars

Nightfall of Diamonds is a double live album by the Grateful Dead released in 2001. It was recorded on October 16, 1989 at Meadowlands Arena in East Rutherford, New Jersey and includes the full concert. This was the final date of a five-day run at the venue.

The artwork depicts the Manhattan skyline from the Hudson Waterfront of New Jersey. This show took place on Bob Weir's 42nd birthday and the band briefly plays "Happy Birthday to You" between "Stuck Inside of Mobile with the Memphis Blues Again" and "Let it Grow." More music from this period can be found on Without a Net, Postcards of the Hanging, and Formerly the Warlocks.

The liner notes give a memorial dedication to Adam Katz, a Deadhead who was mysteriously found dead after the band's show at the same venue two nights earlier.

== Track listing ==
Disc one

First set:

1. "Picasso Moon" (John Barlow, Bob Bralove, Bob Weir) – 7:10 →
2. "Mississippi Half-Step Uptown Toodelloo" (Robert Hunter, Jerry Garcia) – 6:40 →
3. "Feel Like a Stranger" (Barlow, Weir) – 7:38
4. "Never Trust a Woman" (Brent Mydland) – 7:15
5. "Built to Last" (Hunter, Garcia) – 5:20
6. "Stuck Inside of Mobile with the Memphis Blues Again" (Bob Dylan) – 9:20
7. "Let It Grow" (Barlow, Weir) – 11:59 →
8. "Deal" (Hunter, Garcia) – 8:39

Disc two

Second set:

1. "Dark Star" (Hunter, Garcia, Mickey Hart, Bill Kreutzmann, Phil Lesh, Ron McKernan, Weir) – 11:55 →
2. "Playing in the Band" (Hunter, Hart, Weir) – 8:02 →
3. "Uncle John's Band" (Hunter, Garcia) – 9:36 →
4. "Jam" (Grateful Dead) – 9:15 →
5. "Drums" (Hart, Kreutzmann) – 6:05 →
6. "Space" (Garcia, Lesh, Weir) – 6:01 →
7. "I Will Take You Home" (Mydland) – 4:27 →
8. "I Need A Miracle" (Barlow, Weir) – 4:02 →
9. "Dark Star" (Hunter, Garcia, Hart, Kreutzmann, Lesh, McKernan, Weir) – 5:20 →
10. "Attics of My Life" (Hunter, Garcia) – 4:45 →
11. "Playing in the Band" (Hunter, Hart, Weir) – 4:00

Encore:

12. "And We Bid You Goodnight" (trad., arr. Grateful Dead) – 3:10

== Personnel ==
- Jerry Garcia – lead guitar, vocals
- Bob Weir – rhythm guitar, vocals
- Phil Lesh – bass guitar, vocals
- Brent Mydland – Hammond organ, keyboards, vocals
- Mickey Hart – drums, percussion
- Bill Kreutzmann – drums, percussion
- John Cutler – recording
- Rudson Shurtliff – assistant engineer
- Jeffrey Norman – mixing
- David Lemieux – tape archivist
- Cassidy Law – album coordination
- Eileen Law – archival research
- Randy Tuten – cover design

== Charts ==
Chart (2001)	Peak position
US Billboard 200	196

Chart (2024)	Peak position
Hungarian Physical Albums (MAHASZ)	36
