= Merriweather 6/30/85 =

Live album by Grateful Dead
- Released: September 18, 2026
- Recorded: June 30, 1985
- Venue: Merriweather Post Pavilion
- Genre: Rock
- Length: 149:21
- Label: Rhino

Grateful Dead chronology
Summer Magic 1985 (2026)	Merriweather 6/30/85 (2026)	Dave's Picks Volume 60 (2026)

Singles from Merriweather 6/30/85
- 1. "Sugar Magnolia" Released: July 15, 2026; 2. "The Other One" Released: July 30, 2026; 3. "Shakedown Street" Released: August 20, 2026

Merriweather 6/30/85 is a live album by the rock band the Grateful Dead. It contains the complete concert recorded at Merriweather Post Pavilion in Columbia, Maryland on June 30, 1985. It was released on September 18, 2026, as a 3-disc CD and as a 4-disc LP. The same recording was also released on September 18, 2026, as part of the 20-CD box set Summer Magic 1985.

The album was sourced from the original Sony F1 tapes. These use a Digital Audio Tape format that encodes digital audio as a video signal and records it on a videocassette recorder.

== Track listing ==
Disc 1

First set:

1. "Mississippi Half-Step Uptown Toodeloo" (Jerry Garcia, Robert Hunter) – 8:17 >
2. "C.C. Rider" (traditional, arranged by Grateful Dead) – 8:05 >
3. "Brown-Eyed Women" (Garcia, Hunter) – 6:02
4. "Mama Tried" (Merle Haggard) – 2:44 >
5. "Mexicali Blues" (Bob Weir, John Perry Barlow) – 5:16
6. "Keep On Growing" (Eric Clapton, Bobby Whitlock) – 4:37
7. "Big Railroad Blues" (Noah Lewis, arranged by Grateful Dead) – 4:11
8. "Looks Like Rain" (Weir, Barlow) – 7:56 >
9. "Don't Ease Me In" (traditional, arranged by Grateful Dead) – 3:05

Disc 2

Second set:

1. "Shakedown Street" (Garcia, Hunter) – 15:13 >
2. "Samson and Delilah" (traditional, arranged by Grateful Dead) – 8:21
3. "Gimme Some Lovin' " (Spencer Davis, Steve Winwood, Muff Winwood) – 5:30 >
4. "He's Gone" (Garcia, Hunter) – 12:18 >
5. "Cryptical Envelopment" (Garcia) – 1:53 >
6. "Drums" (Mickey Hart, Bill Kreutzmann) – 13:22

Disc 3

Second set, continued:

1. "Space" (Garcia, Phil Lesh, Weir) – 7:30 >
2. "The Other One" (Weir, Kreutzmann) – 6:57 >
3. "Stella Blue" (Garcia, Hunter) – 9:03
4. "Around and Around" (Chuck Berry) – 3:47
5. "Sugar Magnolia" (Weir, Hunter) – 9:11

Encore:

6. "U.S. Blues" (Garcia, Hunter) – 5:08

== Personnel ==
Grateful Dead

- Jerry Garcia – guitar, vocals
- Bob Weir – guitar, vocals
- Brent Mydland – keyboards, vocals
- Phil Lesh – bass, vocals
- Bill Kreutzmann – drums
- Mickey Hart – drums

Production

- Produced by Grateful Dead
- Produced for release by David Lemieux
- Executive producer: Mark Pinkus
- Associate producer: Ivette Ramos
- Recording: Dan Healy
- Mastering: David Glasser
- Art direction and illustration: Marcos Alvarado
- Design: Pablo Valdes
- Liner notes essay: Nicholas G. Meriwether

== Charts ==
Chart performance for Merriweather 6/30/85
Chart (2026)	Peak position
French Physical Albums (SNEP)	173
