= View from the Vault (series) =

Live concert video series by Grateful Dead

View from the Vault is a four-part series of live DVDs and companion soundtracks by the Grateful Dead. The audio is taken from the soundboard and the video from the video screens at the concerts. Each volume was released simultaneously as an album on CD and as a concert performance video on DVD.

== Volumes ==
The first volume was recorded and filmed at Three Rivers Stadium in Pittsburgh on July 8, 1990 with bonus material recorded two days earlier at Cardinal Stadium, Louisville. The soundtrack was released as a 3-CD set.

The second volume features the June 14, 1991 concert at Robert F. Kennedy Stadium in Washington, D.C., and bonus material from a show at the same venue on July 12, 1990. It is the only Grateful Dead video release featuring Vince Welnick and Bruce Hornsby. The DVD contains one track that is not on the CD, "Box of Rain", recorded at the 1990 show. It also includes a music video, "Liberty", directed by Justin Kreutzmann, the son of Dead drummer Bill Kreutzmann.

The third volume contains the June 16, 1990 show at the Shoreline Amphitheatre in Mountain View, California. The album also includes six songs from a show at the same venue on October 3, 1987. One of these is "My Brother Esau", the first appearance of this song on CD.

The fourth volume contains two consecutive complete shows—July 24, 1987, at Oakland Stadium, and July 26, 1987 at Anaheim Stadium. The album was released as a 4-CD set. These concerts were recorded during the "Dylan & the Dead" tour. On this brief tour, each Grateful Dead show was followed by a performance by Bob Dylan, with the Dead providing accompaniment. Songs from those performances are documented on the album Dylan & the Dead. The fourth volume was the only volume that was not also released on VHS videotape. It was also the only DVD of the series that included the option of either a two-channel stereo or a Dolby 5.1 channel surround sound soundtrack.

== See also ==
- Grateful Dead Meet-Up at the Movies
