= View from the Vault =

Live album / soundtrack by Grateful Dead
- Released: June 2000
- Recorded: July 6–8, 1990
- Venues: Three Rivers Stadium (Pittsburgh); Cardinal Stadium (Louisville)
- Length: 211:16
- Label: Grateful Dead

Grateful Dead chronology
Dick's Picks Volume 18 (2000)	View from the Vault (2000)	Dick's Picks Volume 19 (2000)

View from the Vault chronology
View from the Vault (2000)	View from the Vault II (2001)

Professional ratings
Review scores
Source	Rating
Allmusic	3/5 stars
The Encyclopedia of Popular Music	3/5 stars
PopMatters	8/10 (Note: Joint rating with View from the Vault II)

View from the Vault is the first release in a series of DVDs and companion soundtracks by the Grateful Dead known as "View from the Vault". The audio is taken from the soundboard and the video from the video screens at the concerts. The first volume was recorded and filmed at Three Rivers Stadium in Pittsburgh on July 8, 1990 with bonus material recorded two days earlier at Cardinal Stadium, Louisville. The set was certified Gold by the RIAA on February 2, 2001. The soundtrack was released as a 3-CD set.

== Track listing ==
Disc one
First set:

1. "Touch of Grey" (Robert Hunter, Jerry Garcia) – 6:36 →
2. "Greatest Story Ever Told" (Hunter, Mickey Hart, Bob Weir) – 4:44
3. "Jack-a-Roe" (trad., arr. Grateful Dead) – 5:09
4. "New Minglewood Blues" (trad., arr. Weir) – 7:18
5. "Row Jimmy" (Hunter, Garcia) – 11:50
6. "Mama Tried" (Merle Haggard) – 2:32 →
7. "Mexicali Blues" (John Barlow, Weir) – 5:31
8. "Just Like Tom Thumb's Blues" (Bob Dylan) – 6:13
9. "Let It Grow" (Barlow, Weir) – 12:15

Disc two
Second set:

1. "Samson and Delilah" (trad., arr. Weir) – 7:05 →
2. "Eyes of the World" (Hunter, Garcia) – 15:14 →
3. "Estimated Prophet" (Barlow, Weir) – 11:40 →
4. "Terrapin Station" (Hunter, Garcia) – 14:56 →
5. "Jam" (Grateful Dead) – 4:46 →
6. "Drums" (Hart, Bill Kreutzmann) – 7:38 →
7. "Space" (Garcia, Phil Lesh, Weir) – 9:04 →

Disc three
Second set, continued:

1. "I Need a Miracle" (Barlow, Weir) – 5:28 →
2. "Wang Dang Doodle" (Willie Dixon) – 5:20 →
3. "Black Peter" (Hunter, Garcia) – 9:42 →
4. "Throwing Stones" (Barlow, Weir) – 9:22 →
5. "Turn On Your Lovelight" (Deadric Malone, Joseph Scott) – 8:39

Encore:

6. "Knockin' On Heaven's Door" (Dylan) – 7:07

July 6, 1990 – second set:

7. "Standing on the Moon" (Hunter, Garcia) – 9:44 →
8. "He's Gone" (Hunter, Garcia) – 9:41 →
9. "KY Jam" (Grateful Dead) – 13:42

== Personnel ==
- Jerry Garcia – lead guitar, vocals
- Bob Weir – rhythm guitar, vocals
- Phil Lesh – bass guitar, vocals
- Brent Mydland – Hammond organ, keyboards, vocals
- Mickey Hart – drums, percussion
- Bill Kreutzmann – drums, percussion
- Len Dell'Amico - co-producer, director
- Dan Healy – recording
- Dick Latvala – tape archivist
- David Lemieux – tape archivist
- Jeffrey Norman – mastering
- Lindsay Planer – booklet notes
- Bob Minkin, – graphic design, photography

== See also ==
- View from the Vault II
- View from the Vault III
- View from the Vault IV
- Backstage Pass
