= Dick's Picks Volume 23 =

Live album by Grateful Dead
- Released: October 16, 2001
- Recorded: September 17, 1972
- Genre: Rock
- Length: 206:35
- Label: Grateful Dead

Grateful Dead chronology
Nightfall of Diamonds (2001)	Dick's Picks Volume 23 (2001)	The Golden Road (1965–1973) (2001)

Professional ratings
Review scores
Source	Rating
Allmusic	4/5 stars
The Music Box	5/5 stars
Rolling Stone	4/5 stars

Dick's Picks Volume 23 is a three-CD album by the rock group the Grateful Dead. It is the 23rd installment in the Dick's Picks series of live archival recordings. It was recorded on September 17, 1972 at the Baltimore Civic Center in Baltimore. It contains the complete concert, except for the encore, which was "One More Saturday Night".

Dick's Picks Volume 23 was released in 2001. It contains the longest CD version of the song "The Other One" to date, clocking in at nearly 40 minutes.

More music from this tour can be found on Dick's Picks Volume 11, Dick's Picks Volume 36 and 30 Trips Around the Sun.

== Enclosure and reviews ==
The release includes two sheets of paper stapled together in the middle, yielding an eight-page enclosure. The front duplicates the cover of the CD and the back features a picture of a crab.

The first two pages inside the enclosure contain a collage featuring a flier listing the shows the band played during their east coast tour in September of that year, along with three color photographs of the band's members performing on stage. The middle two pages feature two reviews and the left side of the last two pages list the contents of and credits for the release. The right side of the last page features a reddish-tinted monochrome photograph of the band members playing on stage.

=== Review by Gordon Chaplin ===
The review on the left side of the middle two pages was written by Gordon Chaplin, who is from The Baltimore Sun, and dated September 24, 1972. It is entitled "Grateful Dead: whistling through the fog" and subtitled "It seemed, for a while, like San Francisco."

Having relocated from San Francisco to Baltimore in 1970, Chaplin spends most of his review reminiscing about the time he spent on the West Coast in the 1960s. Bemoaning how "the Haight-Ashbury fell apart", he claims the scene ended when "Neal Casady's body was found lifeless on a railroad track in Mexico" because Neal "had been sparking the movement, or whatever it was, ever since the Fifties."

Entitled "Not free or friendly", the third of the three sections comprising Gordon's review observes that "a line of police keeping the crowd in their seats" contributed to the band getting off to a rough start. He goes on to say that once "they moved into one of those expanded renditions of a familiar piece" he finally felt "as if I was back home again." The author ultimately closes his piece on a positive note, stating that eventually "the police moved away from in front of the stage" allowing people to move "up through the fog to get closer to the band."

=== Review by Angie Thornton ===
The review on the right side of the middle two pages was written by Angie Thornton and is from The Afro-American Newspaper Archives and Research Center, dated September 23, 1972. It is entitled "A review: Baltimore" and subtitled "Rock show."

Thornton's review is much shorter than Chaplin's and lacks his reminiscing about bygone days. She makes it clear she was one of the band's newer fans by misspelling Jerry Garcia's first name as "Gerry" and referring to the songs "Mexicali blues", "Friend of the devil" and "Me and my uncle" as "Mr. Kelly blues", "Friend in the Jungle" and "Men and my uncle".

Despite her being a new fan and making a few mistakes, Angie's review is very perceptive. She notes, for example, that the music "grew and grew as the concert went on. And just as a book has a climax, so did the concert." Near the end of her piece she notes that the band had "left the stage, but the audience was not ready for the music to be stopped." The author is clearly amazed by the fans' "hands clapping and feet stomping" until the band returned for the encore, and she concludes her review by observing that "though their names may be Grateful Dead, this group is very much alive."

== Caveat emptor ==
Each volume of Dick's Picks has its own "caveat emptor" label, advising the listener of the sound quality of the recording. The one for Volume 23 reads:

"Dick's Picks Twenty-Three was mastered from the original 1/4" analog tapes, running at 7.5 ips. The mix you hear was done live to two-track at the show, and the results are remarkable. We hope you'll dig it as much as we do."

== Track listing ==
Disc one
First set:

1. "Promised Land" (Chuck Berry) – 3:39
2. "Sugaree" (Robert Hunter, Jerry Garcia) – 7:59
3. "Black-Throated Wind" (John Barlow, Bob Weir) – 6:34
4. "Friend of the Devil" (John Dawson, Hunter, Garcia) – 4:19
5. "El Paso" (Marty Robbins) – 5:11
6. "Bird Song" (Hunter, Garcia) – 10:55
7. "Big River" (Johnny Cash) – 5:22
8. "Tennessee Jed" (Hunter, Garcia) – 8:05
9. "Mexicali Blues" (Barlow, Weir) – 3:57
10. "China Cat Sunflower" > (Hunter, Garcia) – 5:18
11. "I Know You Rider" (trad., arr. Grateful Dead) – 6:16

Disc two

1. "Playing in the Band" (Hunter, Mickey Hart, Weir) – 18:48
2. "Casey Jones" (Hunter, Garcia) – 6:12

Second set:

1. "Truckin' " (Hunter, Garcia, Phil Lesh, Weir) – 12:19
2. "Loser" (Hunter, Garcia) – 7:20
3. "Jack Straw" (Hunter, Weir) – 5:22
4. "Mississippi Half-Step Uptown Toodleloo" > (Hunter, Garcia) – 8:38
5. "Me and My Uncle" (John Phillips) – 3:16

Disc three

1. "He's Gone" > (Hunter, Garcia) – 10:21
2. "The Other One" > (Bill Kreutzmann, Weir) – 39:07
3. "Sing Me Back Home" (Merle Haggard) – 10:50
4. "Sugar Magnolia" (Hunter, Weir) – 9:25
5. "Uncle John's Band" (Hunter, Garcia) – 7:22

== Personnel ==
=== Grateful Dead ===
- Jerry Garcia – lead guitar, vocals
- Bob Weir – rhythm guitar, vocals
- Phil Lesh – electric bass, vocals
- Keith Godchaux – piano
- Donna Jean Godchaux – vocals
- Bill Kreutzmann – drums

=== Production ===
- Owsley Stanley – recording
- Jeffrey Norman – mastering
- Dick Latvala – tape archivist
- David Lemieux – tape archivist
- Eileen Law – archival research
- Tina Carpenter – cover art, design and photos
- Ed Degginger – cover photos
- David DeNoma – cover photos
- Mary Ann Mayer – band photos
- Robert Minkin – layout design
