= CFG Bank Arena =

Arena in Baltimore, Maryland, US

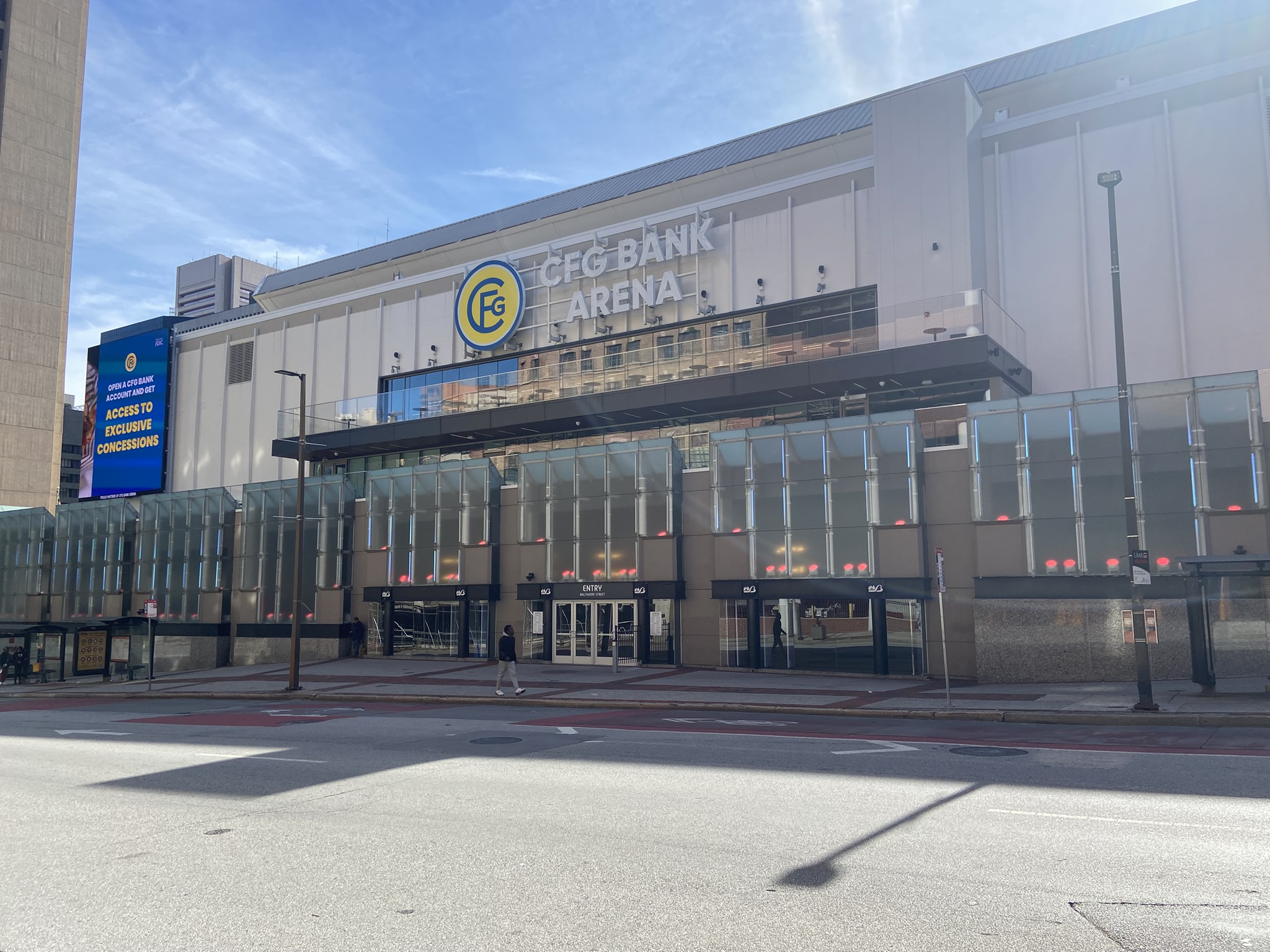
- North entrance to CFG Bank Arena pictured in October 2025

- Location within Maryland Location within the United States
- Interactive map of CFG Bank Arena
- Former names: Baltimore Civic Center (1961–1986); Baltimore Arena (1986–2003, 2013–2014, 2022); 1st Mariner Arena (2003–2013); Royal Farms Arena (2014–2022)
- Address: 201 West Baltimore Street
- Location: Baltimore, Maryland, U.S.
- Coordinates: 39°17′19″N 76°37′8″W
- Owner: City of Baltimore
- Operator: Oak View Group
- Capacity: Maximum: 14,000 Concerts: 13,300 (center stage) 13,000 (end stage); Basketball: 11,183; Ice Hockey/Arena football/Indoor Soccer: 10,582
- Executive suites: 38
- Record attendance: 14,686 (PBC: Gervonta Davis vs. Ricardo Nunez, 2019)
- Public transit: Charles Center; Baltimore Arena

Construction
- Groundbreaking: December 1959
- Opened: October 23, 1962
- Renovated: 1986, 2003, 2022–2023
- Cost: $14 million ($155 million in 2025 dollars)
- Architects: AG Odell Jr. and Associates

Tenants
- Baltimore Clippers (AHL/SHL) 1962–1977; Baltimore Bullets (NBA) 1963–1973; Baltimore Banners (WTT) 1974; Baltimore Blades (WHA) 1975; Baltimore Claws (ABA) 1975 preseason; Baltimore Blast (MISL) 1980–1992; Baltimore Skipjacks (ACHL/AHL) 1981–1993; Baltimore Thunder (EPBLL/MILL/NLL) 1987–1999; Baltimore Blast (NPSL/MISL II/MISL III/MASL) 1992–2017; Baltimore Bayrunners (IBL) 1999–2000; Baltimore Bandits (AHL) 1995–1997; Baltimore Blackbirds (AIFA) 2007; Baltimore Mariners (AIFA/AIF) 2008–2010, 2014; Baltimore Charm (LFL) 2010–2014; Baltimore Brigade (AFL) 2017–2019

Website
- cfgbankarena.com

CFG Bank Arena is a multipurpose arena in Baltimore, Maryland. This venue is located about one block away from the Baltimore Convention Center on the corner of Baltimore Street and Hopkins Place in downtown Baltimore. With a seating capacity of up to 14,000 for concerts, CFG Bank Arena is owned by the City of Baltimore and managed by the Oak View Group, a global sports and entertainment company.

The venue officially opened on October 23, 1962, as the Baltimore Civic Center. Designed by AG Odell Jr. and Associates, it was built on the site of Old Congress Hall, where the Continental Congress met in 1776. The venue has been home to several Baltimore-based sports teams, most notably the Baltimore Bullets (now the Washington Wizards) of the NBA from 1963 to 1973.

As a cornerstone for the Inner Harbor redevelopment during the 1980s, it was reopened after renovations and renamed the Baltimore Arena in 1986. In 2003, it was renamed 1st Mariner Arena for Baltimore-based 1st Mariner Bank, which purchased naming rights to the arena for 10 years. When this naming rights agreement ended in 2013, the arena returned to its "Baltimore Arena" name until convenience store chain Royal Farms purchased the naming rights in September 2014; the arena was known as Royal Farms Arena until 2022. After an extensive renovation, the venue reopened as CFG Bank Arena in February 2023.

== History ==
=== 1960s–1970s ===
A cornerstone to the Arena was laid in 1961 with a vault that included messages from then-U.S. President John F. Kennedy, then-Maryland governor J. Millard Tawes, and then-Baltimore Mayor J. Harold Grady. The vault was opened in 2006. The current site that was chosen for the Baltimore Civic Center was actually not one of the many sites proposed to the Greater Baltimore Committee in 1955. Among nine suggested locations were two in Druid Hill Park, three at the end of the Inner Harbor basin (where the World Trade Center and Harborplace are now located), and one in Clifton Park.

From 1962 through 1976, the Baltimore Clippers of the American Hockey League played their home games at the Arena. The financially troubled Clippers ceased operations in mid-season, 1974–75, when the professional Baltimore Blades (the relocated Michigan Stags) of the World Hockey Association (WHA) moved into the market/arena. The Blades folded at the end of the season, and the Clippers regrouped for one final AHL season 1975–76. The Arena has hosted two other AHL franchises: the Baltimore Skipjacks lasted from 1981 to 1993, and the Baltimore Bandits from 1995 to 1997.

On November 12, 1962, the Arena hosted a boxing match between Joey Giardello and Johnny Morris attended by approximately 6,000 fans.

In 1963, the Arena became the home of the NBA's Baltimore Bullets (originally the Chicago Packers and currently the Washington Wizards), where the team played home games until its move to the Capital Centre in 1973. The NBA All-Star Game was played at the Arena in 1969.

The Beatles performed at the Arena on September 13, 1964, to a total of 28,000 attendees in two performances on the same day, at 4:00 pm and 8:30 pm.

On April 3, 1965, defending WWWF champion Bruno Sammartino defeated Gene Kiniski in a return title match. Just a few months later, in January 1966, Kiniski would win the National Wrestling Alliance (NWA) title.

On April 12, 1966, Dr. Martin Luther King Jr. gave a speech, "Race and the Church", before a gathering of Methodist clergy at the Baltimore Civic Center.

The venue also hosted Led Zeppelin several times through the early 1970s. A couple of scenes from the Led Zeppelin concert film The Song Remains the Same were filmed backstage. On June 13, 1970, The Jimi Hendrix Experience played the Civic Center with a last-minute decision to visit from New York and sold out. This was noted to be one of the best performances of the whole 1970 tour and was one of the last shows Hendrix played before his death a few months later. Chicago performed at the Civic Center on September 4, 1971, the month before the release of their fourth album, Chicago at Carnegie Hall. Elvis Presley played the Civic Center twice: Tuesday, November 9, 1971, 8:30pm (wearing the Red Lion Suit) and again on Sunday, May 29, 1977, 8:30pm (wearing the Mexican Sundial Suit), less than three months before his untimely death. Both shows were complete sell-outs. The 1977 show is notable because Elvis abruptly left the stage for nearly 30 minutes, leaving his band and backup singers to perform. When he returned he joked that "nature called". Elvis appeared to be in discomfort for the rest of the show. The Grateful Dead's performance on September 17, 1972, was recorded and later released as Dick's Picks Volume 23. It contains the complete concert, except for the encore, which was "One More Saturday Night". It contains the longest CD version of "The Other One", to date, at nearly 40 minutes long.

In 1974, the World Team Tennis (WTT) Baltimore Banners played their home games there in their only season. World No. 1 player Jimmy Connors was on that team. After Connors defeated Ken Rosewall in Wimbledon they played each other at the Arena in a rematch. Billie Jean King and John Newcombe both played at the Arena, with their respective WTT clubs.

The Civic Center was host to the 1974 and 1975 MEAC men's basketball tournament. In 1975, professional basketball returned briefly with the Baltimore Claws of the American Basketball Association (ABA). The Memphis Sounds relocated to Baltimore following the 1974–75 ABA season and were first called the Baltimore Hustlers, before changing their name. Troubled financially from the start, the Claws folded after three road exhibition games.

=== 1980s–1990s ===
The Arena was the home of the Major Indoor Soccer League's Baltimore Blast from their arrival in the 1980–1981 season until the league folded in 1992. The Blast won their only championship in the 1983–84 season which was attended by upwards of 11,200 fans. The Blast, regardless of incarnation, were the longest-serving tenant in the Arena's history.

Van Halen performed at the Arena on July 22, 1980, as part of their Van Halen World Invasion Tour. Bon Jovi performed to a sold-out Arena crowd during their Slippery When Wet Tour on December 29, 1986. In 1986 and 1989, the Arena was host to popular Italian opera singer Luciano Pavarotti. Def Leppard performed at the Arena on October 9, 1987, during their Hysteria World Tour.

Kiss performed at the Arena on November 27, 1984, as part of their Animalize World Tour. This performance is notable, because lead guitarist Mark St. John makes his live debut with the band, after being temporarily replaced by Bruce Kulick for the first two months of the tour due to contracting reactive arthritis. Kulick played the first five songs of the show, then St. John joined onstage to perform five songs. Kulick returned onstage and finished the show. Both St. John and Kulick bowed with the rest of the members at the end of the show. St. John went on to play only two full shows with the band before being permanently replaced by Kulick.

The Arena was the home of the Major Indoor Lacrosse League (MILL) and later the National Lacrosse League (NLL) Baltimore Thunder from 1987 through 1999. The Thunder won the inaugural MILL championship. Notable players include Gary Gait, Tom Gravante (head Men's Lacrosse coach at Mount St. Mary's University) and Hugh Donovan. The Arena was a frequent venue for Jim Crockett Promotions (NWA) and World Championship Wrestling (WCW). Starting in 1988, The Great American Bash pay-per-view was held at the Arena eight times. It also hosted SuperBrawl V in 1995. Sting defeated Ric Flair to win his first NWA World Championship at 1990's Great American Bash, and Ron Simmons upset Big Van Vader in 1992 for the WCW title, becoming the first African-American to hold a major world title. The nWo was reformed in 1999 at the Baltimore Arena with Bret Hart, Kevin Nash, Scott Hall and Jeff Jarrett on the Nitro after Starrcade

The Arena has also hosted many WWE events over the years. Most notably the 1994 King of the Ring, No Mercy (2003), No Way Out 2006, Backlash 2008, Extreme Rules (2010), TLC: Tables, Ladders & Chairs (2011), Payback (2015), and Extreme Rules (2017) as well as multiple Raw and SmackDown! tapings. Major title changes to take place in the Arena include Superstar Billy Graham over Bruno Sammartino in 1977 for the WWWF championship and Tito Santana over Greg Valentine in 1985 for the WWF Intercontinental title in a steel cage match.

In 1989, the Arena was host to the U.S. National Figure Skating Championships. Three years later, the International Olympic Committee held the U.S. Olympic Gymnastics Trials there. In 1995, the Arena was host to the NCAA Men's Basketball Division 1 games (Rounds 1 & 2).

The NBA's Washington Bullets (formerly based in Baltimore) played 35 regular season "home" games at the arena from January 1989 through March 1997; their final game at the arena was a 94–87 victory over the Dallas Mavericks on March 29, 1997. The team has yet to play a regular season game in Baltimore under its current Wizards moniker.

=== 2000s ===
The Arena has also been a staple on the PBR's Built Ford Tough Series bull riding tour. It first visited the Arena from 2001 to 2003, then came back again from 2008 to 2010. It returned in 2012 and again in 2015.

On October 25, 2003, Maryland's Good Charlotte performed at the Arena. In July 2004, the Arena was host to the US debut of Japanese rock band L'Arc-en-Ciel, as part of the anime and east Asian culture convention Otakon.

On December 3–4, 2004, the Arena hosted the final Vans Triple Crown Of Freestyle Motocross events.

On February 1, 2006, the Arena hosted the first concert by The Rolling Stones, in Baltimore, since 1969, which was also at the Arena.

On February 19, 2006, No Way Out 2006 was held in Baltimore, the WWE's first pay-per-view in the city since No Mercy 2003. Kurt Angle defeated The Undertaker to retain the World Heavyweight Championship.

The 2006 Miss USA Pageant was held here on April 21, 2006.

On February 11, 2008, the Arena also hosted a rally for presidential candidate Barack Obama.

On April 27, 2008, Backlash 2008 was held in Baltimore. Triple H defeated Randy Orton to win the WWE Championship.

On November 20, 2009, Bruce Springsteen & The E Street Band performed at the Arena, recreating the entirety of their landmark album Born to Run; it was their first tour stop in Baltimore since 1973. Several country-pop music acts have made tour stops at the Arena, including Carrie Underwood and George Strait.

Accolades
#1 Top Grossing Venue in North America in 2009*
#3 Top Grossing Venue in the World in 2008*
#13 Ticket Sales Worldwide All Venues in 2008**
Prime Site Award Winner 2005–2015
*Capacities 10,001–15,000, Billboard magazine
**Pollstar Top 100 Worldwide Arena Venues

=== 2010s ===
The PBR's Built Ford Tough Series bull riding tour returned to the Arena in 2012.

Shogun Fights, the first promoter to bring professional Mixed Martial Arts to the state of Maryland, held its second event, Shogun Fights 2, on March 27, 2010. This event occurs twice each year, once in the Spring and again in the Fall.

On April 25, 2010, the Arena played host to WWE Extreme Rules. It has then played host to Monday Night Raw on June 20, 2011. This episode was named Power to the People. It has played host to WWE's Tables, Ladders & Chairs 2011 on December 18, 2011. It hosted the season 23 premiere of WWE Monday Night Raw on September 8, 2014, and ended the same WWE Raw season on September 7, 2015, with the main event being a six-man tag team match between John Cena and the Prime Time Players vs. Seth Rollins and The New Day. WWE Payback was held in this Arena on May 17, 2015. WWE Extreme Rules held on June 4, 2017, was the latest WWE pay-per-view to be held at the Arena.

On September 30, 2011, the NHL's Washington Capitals played a preseason game against the Nashville Predators in a 2–0 loss at the Arena. It was the arena's first ice hockey event to be played since 1997. A second Capitals preseason game at the arena was played on September 17, 2013, against the Boston Bruins in another 3–2 loss.

On October 17, 2013, the RFA held an NBA preseason game between the Washington Wizards and the New York Knicks to celebrate the Wizards 50th anniversary. The team, who played several games there in the 1990s as the Bullets, played another preseason game at the arena against the New Orleans Pelicans, on October 20, 2014.

On April 26, 2014, the Royal Farms Arena hosted UFC 172: Jones vs. Teixeira.

The Colonial Athletic Association announced they would be moving their men's basketball tournament to the Arena in 2014 under a three-year contract after a 24-year run at the Richmond Coliseum. It is the first time the tournament will be held outside the state of Virginia.

In still more recent years, the Arena continues holding events such as Stevie Wonder (April 2015), Prince (May 2015), the Eagles (July 2015), and Garth Brooks (five sold-out concerts in January 2016).

On November 14, 2016, Monumental Sports & Entertainment (owners of the Washington Wizards of the NBA, Washington Capitals of the NHL, Washington Mystics of the WNBA and the new Washington Valor of the Arena Football League) announced that they had been granted a second Arena Football League franchise, the Baltimore Brigade, to play at the Royal Farms Arena. It is the first time the AFL played in Baltimore and the first team to play in Maryland since the Maryland Commandos played at the Capital Centre in 1989. On July 28, 2018, the Arena and Brigade hosted its first ArenaBowl Championship, ArenaBowl XXXI where the Baltimore Brigade was upset by the Washington Valor 55–69.

On July 23, 2017, Tom Petty and the Heartbreakers played a concert in the arena as part of their 40th Anniversary Tour.

On November 8, 2018, Travis Scott kicked off his Astroworld – Wish You Were Here Tour in the arena.

Accolades
#1 Top Grossing Venue in North America in 2015*
#2 Top Grossing Venue in North America in 2014*
#2 Top Grossing Venue in North America in 2012*
#1 Top Grossing Venue in North America in 2011*
Prime Site Award Winner 2005–2015
*Capacities 10,001–15,000, Billboard magazine
**Pollstar Top 100 Worldwide Arena Venues

=== 2020s ===
The COVID-19 pandemic in Maryland led to the postponement or cancellation of a number of arena events. The venue went dark until a September 2021 Guns N' Roses performance.

In February 2022, the arena hosted the CIAA men's and women's basketball tournament. No further events were scheduled due to the pending renovation. After the tournament, the city terminated its naming rights deal with Royal Farms. Oak View Group, which is leading the arena's renovation, has the right to sell naming rights and other sponsorships.

In October 2022, the arena was renamed CFG Bank Arena. The arena reopened in February 2023 after a year long renovation and once again hosted the 2023 CIAA men's and women's basketball tournament. The first concert held since the renovation was Bruce Springsteen and the E Street Band in April 2023.

On May 3, 2025, Linkin Park played at the venue as part of the From Zero World Tour, promoting their eighth studio album, From Zero.

On May 28, 2025, the arena hosted its first Women's National Basketball Association (WNBA) game between the Indiana Fever and Washington Mystics, followed by a second game between the two teams on September 7, 2025.

On November 3, 2025, the arena hosted a MEAC vs Big Ten Conference Men's Basketball game between Coppin State and University of Maryland, College Park, which Maryland won 61–83.

== Proposed replacement and the decision for renovation ==
On October 16, 2004, The Baltimore Sun revealed that official steps had been taken toward replacing the Arena, then 42 years old. The Maryland Stadium Authority had started soliciting proposals for a feasibility study on building an Arena in downtown Baltimore, due on November 1, 2004. According to the request for proposals, the new Arena would be built on the same site of Royal Farms Arena and "would have a smaller seating capacity than would be required for an NHL or NBA team" but it did not set a specific seating capacity.

On May 15, 2007, The Baltimore Sun reported that the feasibility study started in 2004 had been released publicly and the study stated that the current Arena had "served its useful life" and that Baltimore must build a new Arena or face the risk of losing events. The study rejected a proposal to repair the Arena's aging systems, citing an estimated cost of $60 million, and instead suggested that the city demolish Royal Farms Arena and build a new Arena on the same site or elsewhere in Baltimore. Notably the proposed new Arena would seat only 15,000 to 16,000 people; the study assumed that Baltimore would never be successful in attracting a major pro team in the future; however, city officials were still open to this idea.

Conceivably, the new arena could be successful in attracting a minor-league hockey team, bringing more than 200 new jobs and generating up to $1 million in additional tax revenue. City officials have said that the private sector would need to bear the brunt of the estimated $162-million construction cost of the new arena, as the city is also considering giving up ownership of the arena. The Baltimore Development Corporation (BDC) stated that it would begin seeking interested developers for the project by June 2007. BDC's President M. J. "Jay" Brodie said it was a "miracle" that the current Arena books as many events as it does in its current state. City officials have said the location of the new Arena would be dependent on what the developers suggest. Officials stated that they are equally comfortable with keeping the current Arena, building the new Arena in a new location, then demolishing the current Arena, or encouraging a mixed-use development in the site of the current Arena. Advocates for downtown, including the Downtown Partnership and the Westside Renaissance, want the new Arena to remain in the downtown area.

On November 18, 2007, WJZ 13 reported that seven sites have been submitted to the BDC for a new Arena, and the choices will be narrowed down by the Spring of 2008.

On July 24, 2008, it was reported that the new Arena will be built on the same site as the current one, with a capacity of upwards of 18,500. It was unknown at that time what would happen to concerts and events while construction is underway, or who would develop the new Arena. However, there have been talks about building a temporary facility for events. The Arena was planned to be completed within three years.

On August 27, 2008, The Baltimore Sun reported that developers were looking for designers to build an apartment building and outdoor shopping stores to be a part of the new Royal Farms Arena. Also, the developers announced that they were accepting all design proposals until November 26, 2008, and that, by the summer of 2009, they planned to make a final design decision.

On December 17, 2008, The Baltimore Examiner reported that the Baltimore Development Corp. had received four proposals for the Royal Farms Arena replacement that could take away a "major entertainment venue" for Baltimore for up to "4 years" and the estimated price is $300 million, but could be more depending on additional retail and hotel uses. The Arena is reported to be an 18,500-seat venue built on the site of the current Royal Farms Arena. The four proposals were:

ESmith Legacy and Garfield Traub Development: ESmith Legacy was a team led by former NFL player Emmitt Smith that has offices in Baltimore. This proposal included the following features in addition to the larger Arena:

- 7-screen movie theater
- 20,000 square feet (1,900 m^{2}) of retail space
- 1,000-seat concert venue

Streuver Brothers Eccles & Rouse: A well known Baltimore-based developer. This proposal included:

- 300-room hotel
- 43,000 square feet (4,000 m^{2}) of retail space

Cormony Development and Harrison Development: Respectively, Rockville- and Baltimore-based development firms who have been involved since 2007. This proposal includes:

- 400-room hotel
- 240,000 SF office tower
- 12,000 SF to 20,000 SF of retail space

A&R Development, J Street Development Co., and Accent Development Co.: A partnership of Baltimore-based A&R and Washington based J Street and Accent Development under the name Arena Development. This proposal includes:

- Up to 100,000 square feet (9,300 m^{2}) of retail space

The Baltimore Examiner reported that the BDC could make a decision on the developer as soon as mid-2009.

On July 8, 2009, ArenaDigest.com reported that Baltimore City officials had postponed their plans for constructing a new arena, due in part to the struggling economy, and the officials' decision split between building either an 18,500-seat Arena for a possible NBA or NHL franchise, or constructing a mid-size facility for concerts, family events, and minor league sports.

However, on November 12, 2010, with the recession rebounding, Mayor Stephanie Rawlings-Blake announced that city officials were considering new sites for a new arena. The plan called for Royal Farms Arena to remain open, while a new arena was constructed. While Rawlings-Blake believed that the new Arena would most likely to be erected in the city's West Side, the Greater Baltimore Committee suggested building the Arena as an expansion to the Baltimore Convention Center, to help re-develop the Inner Harbor. The cost would range from $750 to $930 million, since it would include the 18,500-seat Arena, 400,000-square-foot (37,000 m^{2}) expansion of the Baltimore Convention Center, an underground garage, and a new 500-room Sheraton hotel; the proposed Arena site is where the current Sheraton hotel rests.

On January 14, 2015, David S. Cordish, the chairman and CEO of the Cordish Company, proposed to build a 15,000–16,000-seat waterfront arena, but built with expanded capacity in mind. The Arena, accommodated with an outdoor amphitheater and a pedestrian bridge to connect the Inner Harbor and Federal Hill, would cost $450 million and tie up with Harbor East and Power Plant Live. However, the Cordish proposal was scrapped when Maryland Governor Larry Hogan cancelled the Red Line project, which was a dire need for the arena.

On August 3, 2016, talks about the convention center/arena proposal resumed. Up to that point, a few more studies for a new arena have been planned, including a possible renovation of Royal Farms Arena and construction of a new Arena at the city's State Center station.

On November 25, 2020, the Baltimore Development Corporation called for proposals of redeveloping the arena to a state-of-the-art facility, whether through renovation or construction of a brand-new arena. The caveat is that the arena must remain on the current site and that no proposals for alternate sites were under consideration.

On June 23, 2021, it was announced that Oak View Group, in association with the Thirty Five Ventures, the investment company of NBA player Kevin Durant and his agent and business partner, Rich Kleiman entered negotiations to invest $200 million into renovating the Royal Farms Arena. The renovations would feature "overhauled concourses, new suites, new concessions, a new exterior featuring plenty of glass, and new seating." After which, the two companies would manage and lease the arena. On November 24, 2021, the Board of Estimates approved the arrangement with a one-year renovation project beginning in February 2022. The renovation cost $250 million with the arena reopening in February 2023.

== Transportation ==
The CFG Bank Arena is immediately adjacent to the Baltimore Arena station on the Baltimore Light Rail. The Charles Center Metro Subway Station and many bus lines are also nearby.

Events and tenants
Preceded by first arena	Home of the Baltimore Thunder; 1987–1999	Succeeded by Pittsburgh Civic Arena
Preceded by first arena	Home of the Baltimore Blast; 1992–2017	Succeeded by SECU Arena
Preceded by Chicago Coliseum	Home of the Baltimore Bullets; 1963–1973	Succeeded by Capital Centre
Preceded by Madison Square Garden	Host of the NBA All-Star Game; 1969	Succeeded by The Spectrum
