= Grateful Dead: So Far =

1987 rockumentary

So Far
- So Far video tape cover
- Directed by: Len Dell'Amico; Jerry Garcia
- Produced by: Len Dell'Amico
- Starring: Grateful Dead
- Edited by: Veronica Losa
- Distributed by: Grateful Dead Productions
- Release date: 1987
- Running time: 55 minutes
- Country: United States
- Language: English

So Far is a music documentary video by the Grateful Dead. Directed by Jerry Garcia and Len Dell'Amico, it is intended to give a subjective view of the Grateful Dead experience. The soundtrack includes Dead song performances largely from 1985 (both from a concert on December 31, 1985 and in a rehearsal setting). The visuals combine scenes of the band playing the songs, other Dead related material, computer animation, and found footage that has been altered and edited in various ways.

So Far was released on VHS and laserdisc in 1987, and on DVD in 2012 in the All the Years Combine compilation box set. It has a running time of 55 minutes.

== Song list ==
- "Uncle John's Band" (Garcia, Hunter)
- "Playing in the Band" (Weir, Hart, Hunter)
- "Lady with a Fan" (Garcia, Hunter)
- "Space" (Garcia, Weir, Lesh, Mydland)
- "Rhythm Devils" (Hart, Kreutzmann)
- "Throwing Stones" (Weir, Barlow)
- "Not Fade Away" (Hardin, Petty)

== Credits ==
=== Grateful Dead ===
- Jerry Garcia – guitar, lead and backing vocals
- Mickey Hart – drums, percussion
- Bill Kreutzmann – drums, percussion
- Phil Lesh – bass, backing vocals
- Brent Mydland – keyboards, backing vocals
- Bob Weir – guitar, lead and backing vocals

=== Production ===
- Len Dell'Amico, Jerry Garcia – directors
- Len Dell'Amico – producer
- John Cutler – soundtrack producer
- Jerry Garcia – sound mixing
- Candace Brightman – lighting design
- Veronica Loza – editor
- Ann Leslie Uzdavinis, Sue Stephens – associate producers
