= Dead Ringers: The Making of Touch of Grey =

1987 documentary film by Justin Kreutzmann

- Dead Ringers video tape cover
- Directed by: Justin Kreutzmann
- Produced by: Debra Robbins; Justin Kreutzmann
- Starring: Grateful Dead
- Cinematography: Richard Scott
- Edited by: Justin Kreutzmann
- Distributed by: Arista Records
- Release date: 1987
- Running time: 30 minutes
- Country: United States
- Language: English

Dead Ringers: The Making of Touch of Grey is a music documentary film about the American rock group the Grateful Dead. It depicts the production of the band's first music video, for their song "Touch of Grey".

Dead Ringers was directed by Justin Kreutzmann, the son of Grateful Dead drummer Bill Kreutzmann. Released on VHS video tape in 1987, it is 30 minutes long.

The film is known by several different names. The cover of the video box says both Dead Ringers and The Making of the Touch of Grey Video and More. However, the opening titles of the film definitively give the name as Dead Ringers: The Making of Touch of Grey.

== Film sequences ==
Dead Ringers: The Making of Touch of Grey begins with a concert performance of the song "Touch of Grey". This is from the May 9, 1987 Dead show at the Laguna Seca Recreation Area in Monterey, California. This and subsequent sections of Dead Ringers also include interviews with all the members of the Grateful Dead. At that time the band consisted of Jerry Garcia (guitar, vocals), Bob Weir (guitar, vocals), Phil Lesh (bass), Brent Mydland (keyboards, vocals), Bill Kreutzmann (drums and percussion), and Mickey Hart (drums and percussion). The music for "Touch of Grey" had been written by Garcia, and the lyrics were by Robert Hunter. Garcia sang lead vocals. The Dead had been performing the song live since September, 1982. It was about to be released as the first track of the Dead's first studio album in seven years, In the Dark.

The next section of Dead Ringers shows the preparations for the filming of the "Touch of Grey" video. It was decided that the video would depict the band as skeletons, with features and mannerisms that would allow each one to be easily recognizable. The skeletons would be life size marionette puppets. This part of the film shows the construction of the marionettes and other pre-production activities. The "Touch of Grey" video was directed by Gary Gutierrez, who had created the animated scenes for The Grateful Dead Movie. Gutierrez is interviewed, along with several of the puppeteers, one of whom is Annabelle Garcia, daughter of Jerry Garcia and Carolyn "Mountain Girl" Adams.

The next sequence of the documentary covers the filming of the video. After the May 9, 1987 Laguna Seca Grateful Dead show, the audience was readmitted to the concert area, to appear as themselves in the video. The band was filmed on stage, lip syncing the "Touch of Grey" studio recording. Then the marionettes were filmed in the band members' places, also lip syncing the recording. The audience, coached with cue cards, was also filmed. The visuals were naturally enhanced by fog that had rolled in from the nearby Pacific Ocean.

The last section of Dead Ringers consists of the "Touch of Grey" music video. The video shows the band performing "Touch of Grey" on stage before an enthusiastic audience of Deadheads. During the first part of the video, the members of the band are revealed to be skeletons. The fact that they are marionettes is clearly shown, as there is no attempt to hide the strings that move them. After a few verses, brief shots of the band in actual, human form are intercut with the puppet footage. During the last part of the video, the band members are shown as themselves rather than as skeletons.

The closing title music for Dead Ringers: The Making of Touch of Grey is "When Push Comes to Shove", another song from the album In the Dark.

== Aftermath ==
The "Touch of Grey" video received significant amounts of airplay on MTV and other music video stations. Partly as a result of this, the song went on to become the Grateful Dead's only top ten hit. Within a short time, the band had achieved a greater degree of popular, commercial success than in their previous 22 years in the music industry.
