= View from the Vault II =

View From The Vault II

Live album / soundtrack by Grateful Dead
- Released: June 2001
- Recorded: June 14, 1991; July 12, 1990 (bonus material)
- Genres: Folk rock Psychedelic rock Jam
- Length: 207:44
- Label: Grateful Dead

Grateful Dead chronology
Dick's Picks Volume 22 (2001)	View From The Vault II (2001)	Nightfall of Diamonds (2001)

View from the Vault chronology
View from the Vault (2000)	View from the Vault II (2001)	View from the Vault III (2002)

View from the Vault II is a concert film and corresponding live soundtrack album by American jam band the Grateful Dead. It was released in June 2001 through Grateful Dead Records and Monterey Home Video. It features the band's June 14, 1991 concert at Robert F. Kennedy Stadium in Washington, D.C., with three bonus tracks from the same venue recorded on July 12, 1990. It is the only Grateful Dead video release featuring Vince Welnick and Bruce Hornsby.

== Overview ==
The DVD contains one track that is not on the CD, "Box of Rain", recorded at the 1990 show. It also includes a music video, "Liberty", directed by Justin Kreutzmann, the son of Dead drummer Bill Kreutzmann. The video uses audio from March 30, 1994, Atlanta, which was previously released on So Many Roads (1965–1995). The "Rubin and Cherise" on the DVD menu is from the show on June 9, 1991. The film reached number 14 on the Billboard Top Music Videos chart, and the set was certified Gold by the RIAA on February 27, 2003.

== Reception ==
Professional ratings
Review scores
Source	Rating
AllMusic	3/5 stars
The Encyclopedia of Popular Music	3/5 stars
PopMatters	8/10 (Note: Joint rating with View from the Vault)
The Rolling Stone Album Guide	3/5 stars

View from the Vault II has received positive reviews. Lindsey Planer stated the album is "replete with better-than-average versions of well-worn classics such as 'Cold Rain & Snow' and Johnny Cash's 'Big River'", as well as a "smoldering rendition" of "Maggie's Farm". Planer also praised the version of "Slipknot!", stating it "issues rush after rush of flawless execution from lead guitarist Jerry Garcia", which, in turn, "pushes the rest of the band into creating symbiotic musical bliss for both performer and audience alike." Conversely, a review from PopMatters found the versions of "Cold Rain & Snow" and "Wang Dang Doodle" "show the band struggling to find their footing", while stating that within the show's second set, the "seemingly tentative" show "turns into a smoker".

Michael Bonner of Uncut deemed View from the Vault II to be the best entry in the series, highlighting its second set and opining the show was a "last hurrah" for the band, stating that "arguably, they never really reached such magical heights again."

== Track listing ==
Disc one

First set:

1. "Cold Rain & Snow" (trad., arr. Grateful Dead) – 7:00
2. "Wang Dang Doodle" (Willie Dixon) – 6:39
3. "Jack-a-Roe" (trad., arr. Grateful Dead) – 5:48
4. "Big River" (Johnny Cash) – 5:43 →
5. "Maggie's Farm" (Bob Dylan) – 7:44
6. "Row Jimmy" (Robert Hunter, Jerry Garcia) – 11:04
7. "Black-Throated Wind" (John Barlow, Bob Weir) – 7:19
8. "Tennessee Jed" (Hunter, Garcia) – 7:49
9. "The Music Never Stopped" (Barlow, Weir) – 8:55

Disc two

Second set:

1. "Help on the Way" (Hunter, Garcia) – 4:33 →
2. "Slipknot!" (Garcia, Keith Godchaux, Bill Kreutzmann, Phil Lesh, Weir) – 8:30 →
3. "Franklin's Tower" (Hunter, Garcia, Kreutzmann) – 12:27
4. "Estimated Prophet" (Barlow, Weir) – 13:08 →
5. "Dark Star" (Hunter, Garcia, Mickey Hart, Kreutzmann, Lesh, Ron McKernan, Weir) – 11:29 →
6. "Drums" (Hart, Kreutzmann) – 9:54 →
7. "Space" (Garcia, Lesh, Weir) – 6:26 →

Disc three

Second set, continued:

1. "Stella Blue" (Hunter, Garcia) – 13:10 →
2. "Turn On Your Love Light" (Deadric Malone, Joseph Scott) – 9:13

Encore:

3. "It's All Over Now, Baby Blue" (Dylan) – 7:16

July 12, 1990 – second set:

4. "Victim or the Crime" (Gerrit Graham, Weir) – 8:29 →
5. "Foolish Heart" (Hunter, Garcia) – 10:10 →
6. "Dark Star" (Hunter, Garcia, Hart, Kreutzmann, Lesh, McKernan, Weir) – 24:58

== Personnel ==
- Jerry Garcia – lead guitar, vocals
- Bob Weir – rhythm guitar, vocals
- Phil Lesh – bass guitar, vocals
- Vince Welnick – keyboards, vocals
- Mickey Hart – drums, percussion
- Bill Kreutzmann – drums, percussion
- Bruce Hornsby – accordion, piano, synthesizer, vocals
- Brent Mydland - keyboards, vocals (July 12, 1990 bonus footage)
- Len Dell'Amico - co-producer, director
- Dan Healy – recording
- Dick Latvala – tape archivist
- David Lemieux – tape archivist
- Eileen Law – archival research
- Robert Minkin – design
- Susana Millman – photography
- Candace Brightman – Lighting

== See also ==
- View from the Vault
- View from the Vault III
- View from the Vault IV
