= Ticket to New Year's =

- Ticket to New Year's DVD cover
- Directed by: Len Dell'Amico
- Produced by: Len Dell'Amico
- Starring: The Grateful Dead
- Distributed by: Monterey Home Video
- Release date: October 1, 1996
- Running time: 145 minutes
- Country: United States
- Language: English

Ticket to New Year's is a concert video by the Grateful Dead. It was recorded at the Oakland Coliseum Arena in Oakland, California on December 31, 1987. It was released on VHS video tape and on Laserdisc in 1996, and on DVD in 1998.

== Cooking with Jerry ==
The December 31, 1987 concert was broadcast on pay-per-view TV. The broadcast included several sketches that had been recorded in advance with members of the Grateful Dead. These are included in Ticket to New Year's, between the first and second sets.

First we see Tom Davis, explaining to the camera that people need not use drugs or alcohol to have a good time on New Year's Eve. As an example of this he interviews Jerry Garcia who, in a short satire of a cooking show, explains how to make hors d'oeuvres and non-alcoholic punch. Next, all six members of the band answer pre-recorded questions from Deadheads. Some of the questions and especially the answers are less than perfectly serious. After that is a brief scene of Mickey Hart as Mr. Spock using a Vulcan mind meld to read the thoughts of Jerry Garcia as Santa Claus. The sketches conclude with the band answering more questions from Deadheads.

Then, back at the concert, the clock has struck midnight, and as the second set begins, Bill Graham can briefly be seen, riding in over the audience on a replica of the Golden Gate Bridge.

== Track listing ==
First set:

- "Bertha" (Garcia, Hunter)
- "Cold Rain And Snow" (traditional, arranged by Grateful Dead)
- "Little Red Rooster" (Dixon)
- "When Push Comes To Shove" (Garcia, Hunter)
- "When I Paint My Masterpiece" (Dylan)
- "Bird Song" (Garcia, Hunter)
- "The Music Never Stopped" (Weir, Barlow)

Second set:

- "Hell In A Bucket/Happy New Year" (Weir, Mydland, Barlow) →
- "Uncle John's Band" (Garcia, Hunter) →
- "Lady With a Fan" (Garcia, Hunter) →
- "Terrapin Station" (Garcia, Hunter) →
- "Drums" (Hart, Kreutzmann) →
- "Space" (Garcia, Lesh, Mydland, Weir) →
- "The Other One" (Kreutzmann, Weir) →
- "Wharf Rat" (Garcia, Hunter) →
- "Throwing Stones" (Weir, Barlow) →
- "Not Fade Away" (Hardin, Petty)

Encore:

- "Knockin' on Heaven's Door" (Dylan) — with The Neville Brothers, David Nelson, and Ramblin' Jack Elliott

== Concert set list ==
At the December 31, 1987 show at the Oakland Coliseum Arena, the second song of the first set was "Promised Land", which does not appear on Ticket to New Year's.

The concert also had a third set, the first four songs of which are not included in the video — "Man Smart, Woman Smarter", "Iko Iko", "Day-O" and "Do You Wanna Dance?". The Grateful Dead performed these songs with members of The Neville Brothers.

"Knockin' on Heaven's Door" concluded the show. On the video, it is presented as the encore. At the concert, it was the fifth and final song of the third set.

== Credits ==
=== Grateful Dead ===
- Jerry Garcia – guitar, vocals
- Mickey Hart – drums, percussion
- Bill Kreutzmann – drums, percussion
- Phil Lesh – bass
- Brent Mydland – keyboards, vocals
- Bob Weir – guitar, vocals

=== Production ===
- Len Dell'Amico – director, producer
- John Cutler and Phil Lesh – post production, audio mix
- Candace Brightman – lighting director
- Dan Healy – concert sound
- Allen Newman – line producer
- Jeffrey Norman – audio post editing
- Bill Weber, Western Images – video post editing
- Justin Kreutzmann – second unit director
