= My Brother Esau =

Single by Grateful Dead
- A-side: "Touch of Grey"
- Written: August–December 1982
- Released: June 16, 1987
- Length: 4:17
- Label: Arista
- Songwriters: Bob Weir; John Perry Barlow
- Producers: Jerry Garcia; John Cutler

Grateful Dead singles chronology
"Don't Ease Me In" (1980)	"Touch of Grey" / "My Brother Esau" (1987)	"Throwing Stones" (1987)

"My Brother Esau" is a song by American rock band the Grateful Dead. It was written by rhythm guitarist and vocalist Bob Weir and lyricist John Perry Barlow. The song was released as the B-side to the "Touch of Grey" single on June 16, 1987, and also appeared on cassette versions of In the Dark (1987). Like much of In the Dark, the song was written years before its release, and was performed by the band starting in 1983.

== Overview ==
According to David Dodd, "My Brother Esau" was written from August through December 1982 in Cora, Wyoming. The song's first live performance was on March 25, 1983, at the Compton Terrace Amphitheater in Tempe, Arizona, and it remained in the Grateful Dead's sets for four years, last being played on October 3, 1987. Its arrangement varied between performances, sometimes starting with a drum intro, and other times beginning with the full band. The studio recording begins with the sound of a helicopter, which Dodd comments is "seemingly lifted straight out of Apocalypse Now". Other musical features of the song include its "mid-tempo" pace and slide guitar.

Lyrically, "My Brother Esau" uses biblical allusions and references to the Vietnam War to comment on the after-effects of the 1960s. According to Philip Martin of the Arkansas Democrat-Gazette, the song "recasts a biblical inheritance story as a post-Vietnam American reckoning", while Scott McLennan of The Arts Fuse characterizes the track as a "biblical-meets-political mash-up". The lyrics reference the story of Esau and Jacob, which Weir stated was utilized as a "biblical precedent for what was happening in American society at the time." He told Blair Jackson in 1985 that the song is "an allegory about what happened to members of our generation, where one brother went off and fought a war and one brother stayed home and more or less minded the store." Martin highlights the phrase "shadowboxing the apocalypse", finding it to be "evocative without insisting on profundity" while "suggest[ing] motion without illusion". Dodd theorizes the lyric "killed a hunter / back in 1969" refers to the killing of Meredith Hunter by a member of the Hells Angels at the Altamont Festival in 1969. In later years, Weir changed the year referenced in the lyrics multiple times, including to 1959 and 2009.

== Release and reception ==
"My Brother Esau" was released as the B-side to the "Touch of Grey" single on June 16, 1987. It also appeared as a cassette-only bonus track on In the Dark. In 2004, it was included as a bonus track on the Beyond Description (1973–1989) reissue of In the Dark, while multiple live recordings have appeared on the band's retrospective live releases. A live performance by Bob Weir & Wolf Bros appears on Live in Colorado (2022).

Wade Tatangelo of the Sarasota Herald-Tribune considers "My Brother Esau" to be one of the strongest songs on the cassette edition of In the Dark, praising it as "delightfully mysterious" and highlighting the guitar work as well as the line "shadowboxing the apocalypse", which he deems an "ingenious lyric". Ultimate Classic Rock listed it among Weir's 10 best songs, calling it "a prototypical Weir/Dead tune, wrapped in a tight groove that puts up some welcome guardrails for the guitars and percussionists to accent but never stray off target."

Weir himself had mixed feelings about the song. As early as 1985, he expressed the desire to rework the lyrics with Barlow, wanting to retain the imagery but make it "not quite so obscure", as he felt the song "might have a little more punch if it were a little easier to understand". In a 2005 interview with Dennis McNally, Weir again expressed dissatisfaction with the lyrics, stating that while he "loved" playing it from a musical standpoint, he found the words to be "too obtuse". He remarked that while he "worked and worked and worked on it", he ultimately "still couldn't understand the point that I was fucking making." In March 2012, Weir was encouraged by the National to revisit the song, where he reworked the lyrics of the bridge.
