= Drums and Space =

"Drums" and "Space" are improvised pieces of music performed by the American rock group Grateful Dead in their live concerts. Usually appearing in the middle of a show's second set, "Drums" (sometimes referred to as "Rhythm Devils") and "Space" consisted of free improvisation without any preconceived structures or themes, and often developing into highly experimental and unpredictable music. "Drums" and "Space" thus contrasted with the usual improvisational style of the band, which was based on jams originating from the chords and structures of familiar songs. After the 1995 death of guitarist and vocalist Jerry Garcia and the band's dissolution, new versions of "Drums" and "Space" continued to be played by spin-off bands such as The Other Ones, The Dead, and Dead & Company.

== Background and development ==
While drum solos were a frequent presence in the Grateful Dead's shows from near the beginning of their career, the pairing of "Drums" and "Space" was not fully established until the late 1970s. Also cited as an early precursor to "Space" is a November 1973 performance by Grateful Dead members Garcia, drummer Mickey Hart and bassist Phil Lesh (as well as guest keyboardist Ned Lagin). The performance, entitled "An Experiment in Quadrophonic Sound", included Garcia plugging his guitar into an ARP Odyssey synthesizer, which Hart has suggested predicted the MIDI experimentation of the band's later years.

Notable performances of "Space" include a "Close Encounters"-themed performance from January 22, 1978 (sometimes cited as the first "true" "Drums > Space"); a performance quoting Edgar Allan Poe's "The Raven" on April 19, 1982; and a guest appearance from saxophonist Branford Marsalis on March 29, 1990. "Drums" and "Space" continued to be a part of sets by later Dead-related bands, including Dead & Company.
