= Dave's Picks Volume 4 =

Live album by Grateful Dead
- Released: November 1, 2012
- Recorded: September 24, 1976
- Genre: Rock
- Length: 161:36
- Label: Rhino
- Producer: Grateful Dead

Grateful Dead chronology
| Spring 1990: So Glad You Made It (2012) | Dave's Picks Volume 4 (2012) | Winterland: May 30th 1971 (2012) |

Dave's Picks Volume 4 is a three-CD live album by the rock band the Grateful Dead. It contains the complete concert recorded on September 24, 1976, at the College of William & Mary in Williamsburg, Virginia. It was released on November 1, 2012.

Dave's Picks Volume 4 is the fourth in the Dave's Picks series of Grateful Dead archival releases, the successor to the Road Trips series, and was produced as a limited edition of 12,000 numbered copies.

Part of the show was previously released on the Spirit of '76 bonus disc included in some copies of Live at the Cow Palace. Music from the concert performed the following night was released on Dick's Picks Volume 20.

== Track listing ==
=== Disc 1 ===
First set:

1. "Promised Land" (Chuck Berry) – 4:41
2. "Deal" (Jerry Garcia, Robert Hunter) – 5:07
3. "Cassidy" (Bob Weir, John Perry Barlow) – 4:34
4. "Sugaree" (Garcia, Hunter) – 10:25
5. "Looks Like Rain" (Weir, Barlow) – 7:53
6. "Row Jimmy" (Garcia, Hunter) – 9:48
7. "Big River" (Johnny Cash) – 5:33
8. "Tennessee Jed" (Garcia, Hunter) – 8:55

=== Disc 2 ===
1. "Playing in the Band" > (Weir, Mickey Hart, Hunter) – 11:53 (Note: Previously released on Spirit of '76)
2. "Supplication" > (Weir, Barlow) – 4:55
3. "Playing in the Band" (Weir, Hart, Hunter) – 4:43

Second set:

4. "Might as Well" (Garcia, Hunter) – 7:36
5. "Samson and Delilah" (traditional, arranged by Weir) – 7:02
6. "Loser" (Garcia, Hunter) – 8:06
7. "New Minglewood Blues" (traditional, arranged by Grateful Dead) – 4:30

=== Disc 3 ===
1. "Help on the Way" > (Garcia, Hunter) – 5:06
2. "Slipknot!" > (Garcia, Phil Lesh, Weir, Bill Kreutzmann, Keith Godchaux) – 5:07
3. "Drums" > (Hart, Kreutzmann) – 5:36
4. "Slipknot!" > (Garcia, Lesh, Weir, Kreutzmann, K. Godchaux) – 5:28
5. "Franklin's Tower" > (Garcia, Kreutzmann, Hunter) – 8:12
6. "The Music Never Stopped" > (Weir, Barlow) – 5:49
7. "Stella Blue" (Garcia, Hunter) – 7:35
8. "Around and Around" (Berry) – 6:54

Encore:

9. "U.S. Blues" (Garcia, Hunter) – 5:56

== Personnel ==
=== Grateful Dead ===
- Jerry Garcia – lead guitar, vocals
- Donna Jean Godchaux – vocals
- Keith Godchaux – keyboards
- Mickey Hart – drums
- Bill Kreutzmann – drums
- Phil Lesh – electric bass
- Bob Weir – rhythm guitar, vocals

=== Production ===
- Produced by Grateful Dead
- Produced for release by David Lemieux
- Executive producer: Mark Pinkus
- Associate producer: Doran Tyson
- CD mastering: Jeffrey Norman
- Recording: Dan Healy
- Art direction and design: Steve Vance
- Cover art: Scott McDougall
- Tape research: Michael Wesley Johnson
- Archival research: Nicholas Meriwether
- Photos: James R. Anderson
- Liner notes essay "Higher Ed with the Dead": Nicholas Meriwether
