= Three from the Vault =

Live album by Grateful Dead
- Released: June 26, 2007
- Recorded: February 19, 1971
- Genres: Rock, country rock, psychedelic rock, jam
- Length: 142:42
- Label: Rhino
- Producer: Grateful Dead

Grateful Dead chronology
Live at the Cow Palace (2007)	Three from the Vault (2007)	Road Trips Volume 1 Number 1 (2007)

Professional ratings
Review scores
Source	Rating
All About Jazz	(not rated)
AllMusic	3.5/5 stars
JamBands.com	(not rated)
The Music Box	3.5/5 stars
Rolling Stone	4/5 stars
Starpulse	(not rated)

Three from the Vault is a live album by the Grateful Dead. It contains the complete show recorded on February 19, 1971 at the Capitol Theatre in Port Chester, New York. It was released on June 26, 2007.

The album was mastered from the 16-track concert soundboard tapes. Although the album was released in 2007, longtime Grateful Dead engineer Dan Healy actually mixed the album in 1993, and its release was delayed 14 years for unknown reasons.

== The Capitol Theatre show ==
The February 19, 1971 Port Chester concert marked the beginning of Mickey Hart's temporary departure from the band. The previous night's show would be his last with the Grateful Dead until his return on October 20, 1974. The February 19 concert included the first live performances of the songs "Bird Song" and "Deal", and the second performances of "Loser", "Bertha", "Playing in the Band", "Greatest Story Ever Told", and "Wharf Rat". The concert, which was on a Friday night, was the second of a series of six shows in seven days at the Capitol Theatre. All shows in the run were recorded on multitrack tapes. Further releases include the February 21 show on the Workingman's Dead 50th Anniversary Deluxe Edition in July 2020, the February 18 show on the American Beauty 50th Anniversary Deluxe Edition in October 2020 and the February 24 show, with bonus tracks from February 20, on Enjoying the Ride in May 2025.

The opening act for this series of concerts, and for many other shows of that era, was the New Riders of the Purple Sage. At that time the lineup of the New Riders featured Jerry Garcia of the Grateful Dead playing pedal steel guitar. The band also included John Dawson, David Nelson, Dave Torbert, and Spencer Dryden. Songs that they recorded at the February 21 and February 23, 1971 shows at the Capitol Theatre were released as an album called Vintage NRPS.

Other live Grateful Dead albums recorded in early to mid 1971 with the same band lineup as on Three from the Vault are (in order of release): Skull and Roses, Ladies and Gentlemen... the Grateful Dead, Dick's Picks Volume 35, Road Trips Volume 1 Number 3, Winterland: May 30th 1971, Skull and Roses (50th Anniversary Deluxe Edition), and Dave's Picks Volume 51. Additionally, shows from this era are included in the box sets 30 Trips Around the Sun and Enjoying the Ride.

== Track listing ==
=== Disc one ===
First set:

1. "Two Ditties" – 1:19
  - "The Merry-Go-Round Broke Down" (Friend, Franklin)
  - "Spring Song" (Mendelssohn)
2. "Truckin'" (Garcia, Lesh, Weir, Hunter) – 8:09
3. "Loser" (Garcia, Hunter) – 6:23
4. "Cumberland Blues" (Garcia, Lesh, Hunter) – 4:58
5. "It Hurts Me Too" (Elmore James, Tampa Red) – 6:10
6. "Bertha" (Garcia, Hunter) – 5:21
7. "Playing in the Band" (Weir, Hart, Hunter) – 5:14
8. "Dark Hollow" (Bill Browning) – 3:15
9. "Smokestack Lightning" (Howlin' Wolf) – 14:42
10. "China Cat Sunflower" (Garcia, Hunter) – 3:24 →
11. "I Know You Rider" (traditional, arranged by Grateful Dead) – 7:02

=== Disc two ===
Second set:

1. "Greatest Story Ever Told" (Weir, Hunter) – 4:22 →
2. "Johnny B. Goode" (Chuck Berry) – 3:26
3. "Bird Song" (Garcia, Hunter) – 7:04
4. "Easy Wind" (Hunter) – 8:17
5. "Deal" (Garcia, Hunter) – 4:22
6. "That's It for the Other One" – 16:09 →
  - "Cryptical Envelopment" (Garcia)
  - "Drums" (Kreutzmann)
  - "The Other One" (Weir, Kreutzmann)
7. "Wharf Rat" (Garcia, Hunter) – 9:08
8. "Good Lovin'" (Artie Resnick, Rudy Clark) – 18:43
9. "Casey Jones" (Garcia, Hunter) – 5:00

== Credits ==
=== Grateful Dead ===
- Jerry Garcia – lead guitar, vocals
- Phil Lesh – bass, vocals
- Ron "Pigpen" McKernan – keyboards, harmonica, percussion, vocals
- Bill Kreutzmann – drums
- Bob Weir – rhythm guitar, vocals

=== Production ===
- Produced by Grateful Dead
- Recorded by Bob Matthews & Betty Cantor
- Mixed by Dan Healy
- Engineered by Jeffrey Norman & Don Pearson
- Mastering by Joe Gastwirt at Joe's Mastering Joint
- Tape Archivist: Dick Latvala
- Cover & Package Design: Steve Vance
- Photos by Fred Ordower (live), Bob Seidemann

== Charts ==
Chart (2007)	Peak position
US Billboard 200	112
