= Grateful Dead Download Series Volume 9 =

Live album by Grateful Dead
- Released: January 3, 2006
- Recorded: April 2 & 3, 1989
- Length: 289:13
- Label: Grateful Dead Productions

Grateful Dead chronology
Grateful Dead Download Series: Family Dog at the Great Highway (2005)	Grateful Dead; Download Series Volume 9 (2006)	Grateful Dead Download Series Volume 10 (2006)

Download Series Volume 9 is a live album by the rock band Grateful Dead. It was released on January 3, 2006, as a digital download. The album features two complete concerts, spanning four discs, recorded on April 2 and 3, 1989 at the Civic Arena (also known as the Igloo) in Pittsburgh.

Volume 9 was mastered in HDCD by Jeffrey Norman.

== Track listing ==
Disc one

April 2, 1989
First set:

1. "Iko Iko" (Crawford, B. Hawkins, R. Hawkins, Johnson) – 5:57
2. "Little Red Rooster" (Dixon) – 9:26
3. "Dire Wolf" (Garcia, Hunter) – 3:55
4. "It's All Over Now" (B. Womack, S. Womack) – 8:40
5. "We Can Run" (Mydland, Barlow) – 5:11
6. "Brown-Eyed Women" (Garcia, Hunter) – 5:17
7. "Queen Jane Approximately" (Dylan) – 6:48
8. "Tennessee Jed" > (Garcia, Hunter) – 7:39
9. "The Music Never Stopped" (Weir, Barlow) – 8:04
10. Encore: "It's All Over Now, Baby Blue" (Dylan) – 7:45

Disc two

Second set:

1. "Shakedown Street" (Garcia, Hunter) – 12:05
2. "Man Smart, Woman Smarter" (Span) – 8:18
3. "Foolish Heart" > (Garcia, Hunter) – 7:51 >
4. "Rhythm Devils" > (Hart, Kreutzmann) – 10:53
5. "Space" > (Garcia, Lesh, Hunter) – 8:58
6. "The Wheel" > (Garcia, Hunter) – 4:27
7. "Dear Mr. Fantasy" > (Winwood, Capaldi, Wood) – 5:08
8. "Hey Jude" > (Lennon, McCartney) – 2:39
9. "Around and Around" > (Berry) – 3:50
10. "Goin' Down the Road Feeling Bad" > (Trad. Arr. By Grateful Dead) – 5:44
11. "Turn On Your Lovelight" (Scott, Malone) – 5:44

Disc three

April 3, 1989
First set:

1. "Greatest Story Ever Told" > (Weir, Barlow) – 4:13
2. "Bertha" > (Garcia, Hunter) – 7:18
3. "Walking Blues" (Johnson) – 6:48
4. "Jack-a-Roe" (Trad. Arr. By Grateful Dead) – 5:43
5. "El Paso" (Robbins) – 5:31
6. "Built to Last" (Garcia, Hunter) – 5:26
7. "Victim or the Crime" (Weir, Graham) – 7:38
8. "Just Like Tom Thumb's Blues" (Dylan) – 5:06
9. "Don't Ease Me In" (Trad. Arr. By Grateful Dead) – 3:26

Second set:

10. "Blow Away" (Mydland, Barlow) – 8:12

Encore:

11. "Johnny B. Goode" > (Berry) – 4:30
12. "Black Muddy River" (Garcia, Hunter) – 6:44

Disc four

Second set, continued:

1. "Estimated Prophet" > (Weir, Barlow) – 10:46
2. "Crazy Fingers" > (Garcia, Hunter) – 8:14
3. "Uncle John's Band" > (Garcia, Hunter) – 11:46
4. "Rhythm Devils" > (Hart, Kreutzmann) – 7:24
5. "Space" > (Garcia, Lesh, Weir) – 9:37
6. "Gimme Some Lovin' " > (S. Winwood, M. Winwood, Davis) – 5:11
7. "I Need a Miracle" > (Weir, Barlow) – 4:15
8. "Stella Blue" > (Garcia, Hunter) – 8:02
9. "Sugar Magnolia" (Weir, Hunter) – 8:54

== Personnel ==
Grateful Dead

- Jerry Garcia – lead guitar, vocal
- Mickey Hart – drums
- Bill Kreutzmann – drums
- Phil Lesh – electric bass, vocals
- Brent Mydland – keyboards, vocals
- Bob Weir – rhythm guitar, vocals

Production

- Dan Healy – recording
- Jeffrey Norman – mastering
