= Civic Arena (Pittsburgh) =

Arena in Pittsburgh

- The Igloo; The House That Lemieux Built
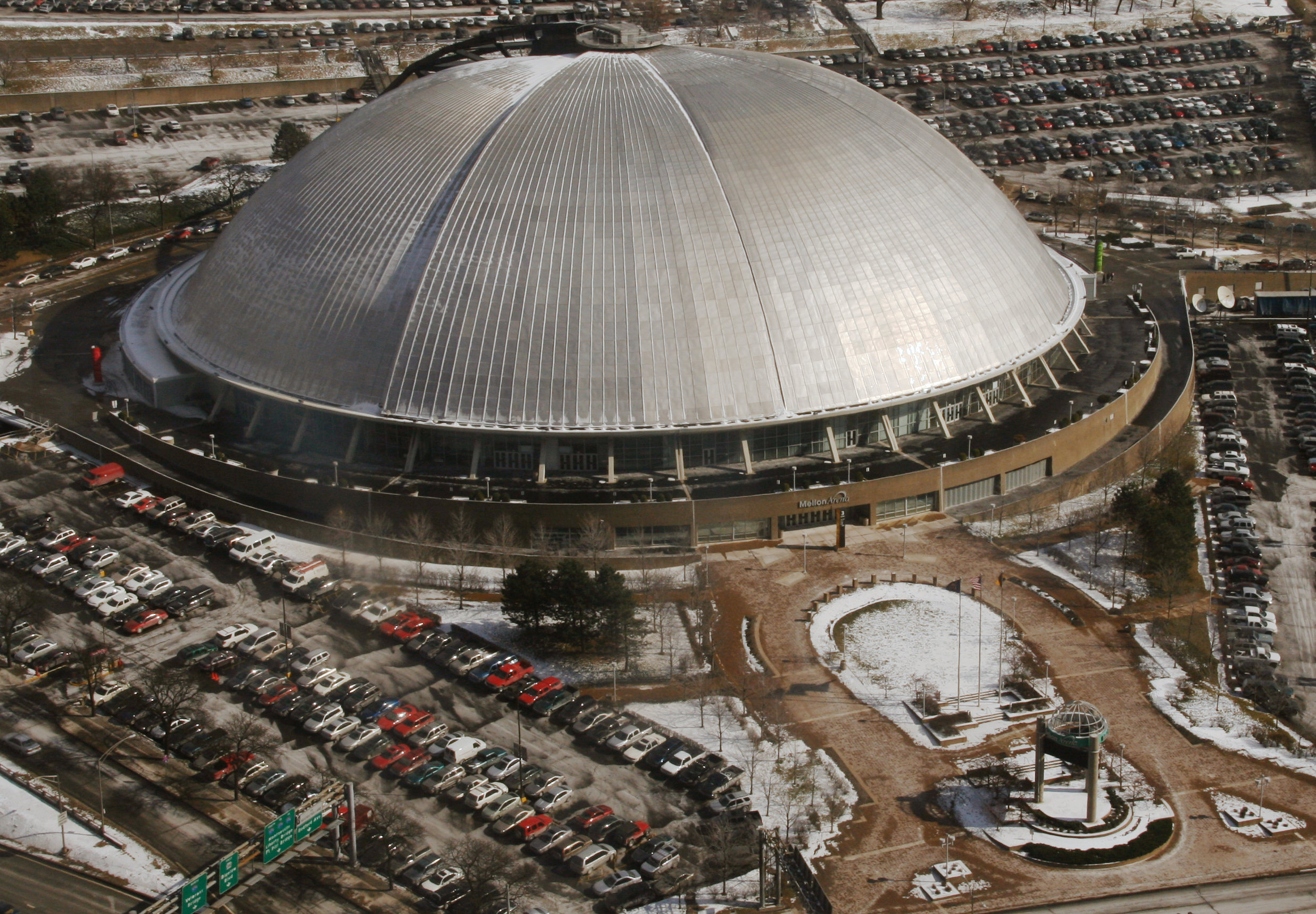
- Interactive map of Civic Arena
- Former names: Civic Auditorium (1961); Civic Arena (1961–1999; 2010–2011); Mellon Arena (December 1999 – June 2010)
- Location: 66 Mario Lemieux Place, Pittsburgh, Pennsylvania 15219-3504
- Coordinates: 40°26′30″N 79°59′24″W
- Owner: Sports & Exhibition Authority of Pittsburgh and Allegheny County
- Operator: SMG
- Capacity: Ice hockey: 16,940; Hockey SRO: 17,132; Basketball: 17,537; Concert: End Stage 12,800; Center Stage 18,039
- Field size: 250 ft × 120 ft (76 m × 37 m)

Construction
- Groundbreaking: March 12, 1958
- Opened: September 17, 1961
- Renovated: 1986 ($19.5 million); Summer 1993
- Closed: June 26, 2010
- Demolished: September 26, 2011 – March 31, 2012
- Cost: US$22 million ($239 million in 2025 dollars)
- Architects: Mitchell & Ritchey Architects
- Structural engineer: Ammann & Whitney
- General contractor: Dick Corporation

Tenants
- Pittsburgh Rens (ABL) 1961–1963; Pittsburgh Hornets (AHL) 1961–1967; Duquesne Dukes (NCAA) 1964–1988; Pittsburgh Pipers/Condors (ABA) 1967–1968, 1969–1972; Pittsburgh Penguins (NHL) 1967–2010; Pittsburgh Triangles (WTT) 1974–1976; Pittsburgh Spirit (MISL) 1978–1986; Pittsburgh Gladiators (AFL) 1987–1990; Pittsburgh Bulls (MILL) 1990–1993; Pittsburgh Phantoms (RHI) 1994; Pittsburgh Stingers (CISL) 1994–1995; Pittsburgh CrosseFire (NLL) 2000; Pittsburgh Xplosion (ABA) 2005–2006

The Civic Arena, formerly the Civic Auditorium and later Mellon Arena, was a multi-purpose arena located in Downtown Pittsburgh, Pennsylvania. It primarily served as the home to the Pittsburgh Penguins, the city's National Hockey League (NHL) franchise, from 1967 to 2010.

Constructed in 1961 for use by the Pittsburgh Civic Light Opera (CLO), it was the brainchild of department store owner Edgar J. Kaufmann. It was the first retractable roof major-sports venue in the world, covering 170,000 square feet (16,000 m^{2}), constructed with nearly 3,000 tons of Pittsburgh steel and supported solely by a massive 260-foot-long (79 m) cantilevered arm on the exterior. Even though it was designed and engineered as a retractable-roof dome, the operating cost and repairs to the hydraulic jacks halted all full retractions after 1995, and the roof stayed permanently closed after 2001. The first roof opening was during a July 4, 1962, Carol Burnett show to which she exclaimed, "Ladies and gentlemen ... I present the sky!"

The Civic Arena hosted numerous concerts, the circus, political and religious rallies, roller derbies as well as contests in hockey, basketball, fish tournament weigh-ins, pro tennis, boxing, wrestling, lacrosse, football, ice skating championships, kennel shows, and soccer. The structure was used as the backdrop for several major Hollywood films, most prominently Sudden Death in 1995. Prior to its demise, it was known as Mellon Arena, named for Mellon Financial, specifically American businessman and 49th Secretary of the Treasury Andrew W. Mellon, which purchased the naming rights in 1999. Their naming rights expired on August 1, 2010, and the arena once again adopted the name of Civic Arena.

The Civic Arena closed on June 26, 2010. The former Mellon naming rights expired soon after, and the Penguins and all other events moved across the street to the new Consol Energy Center (now PPG Paints Arena). After various groups declined historic status for the venue, it was demolished between September 2011 and March 2012. In its place, existing public parking lots in the area were expanded over the entire site. Two of the many streets stricken from the city's street plan when the arena was originally built were subsequently re-extended back through the site: Wylie Avenue and Fullerton Street. On March 13, 2025, ground was broken for the upcoming construction of Citizens Live at the Wylie, a 4,500 capacity venue, which is expected to open in mid 2026. The Penguins have the rights to redevelop the property and a preliminary plan exists for residential units, retail and office space.

== Construction and design ==
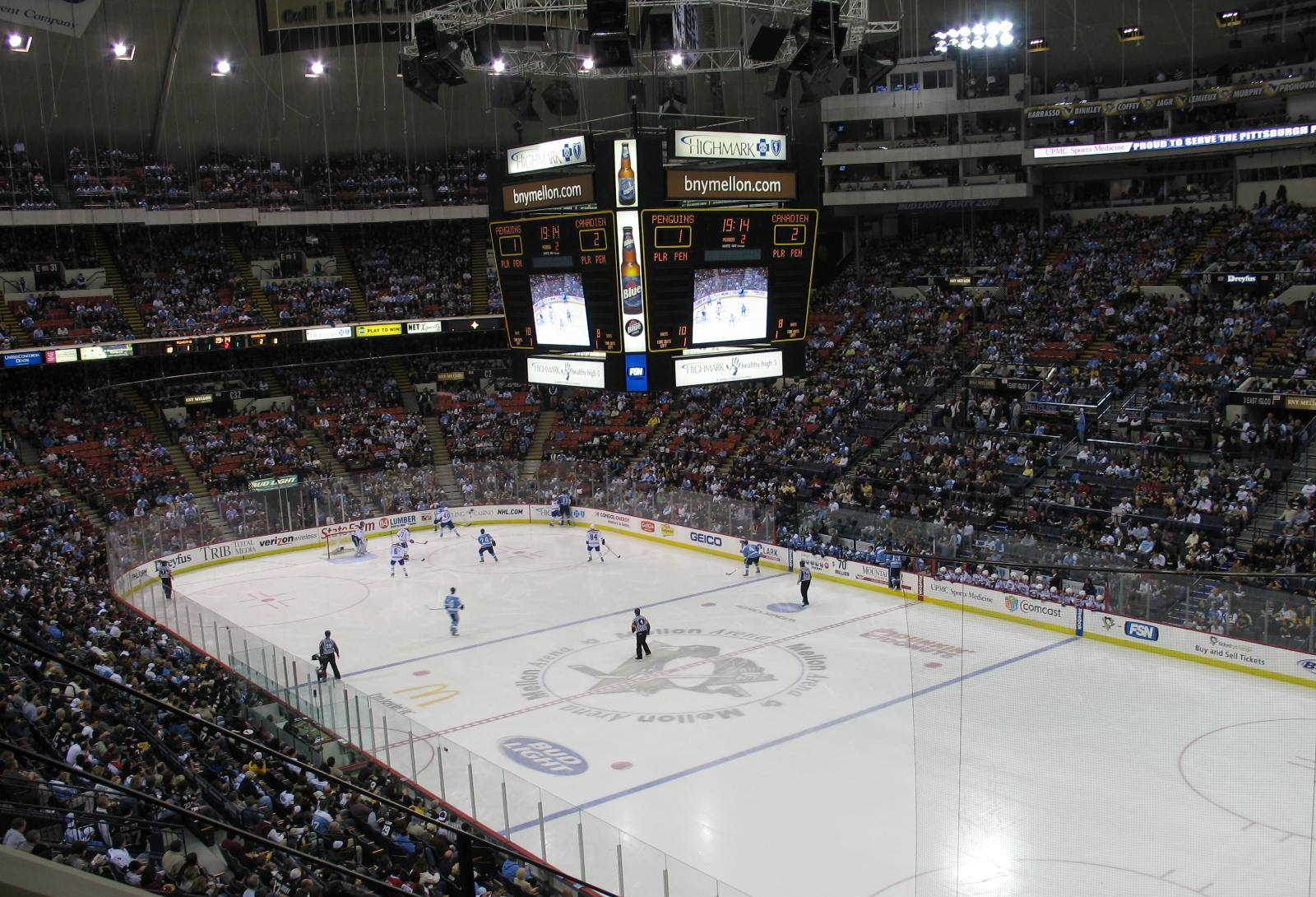
The Civic Arena during a Penguins game in 2008

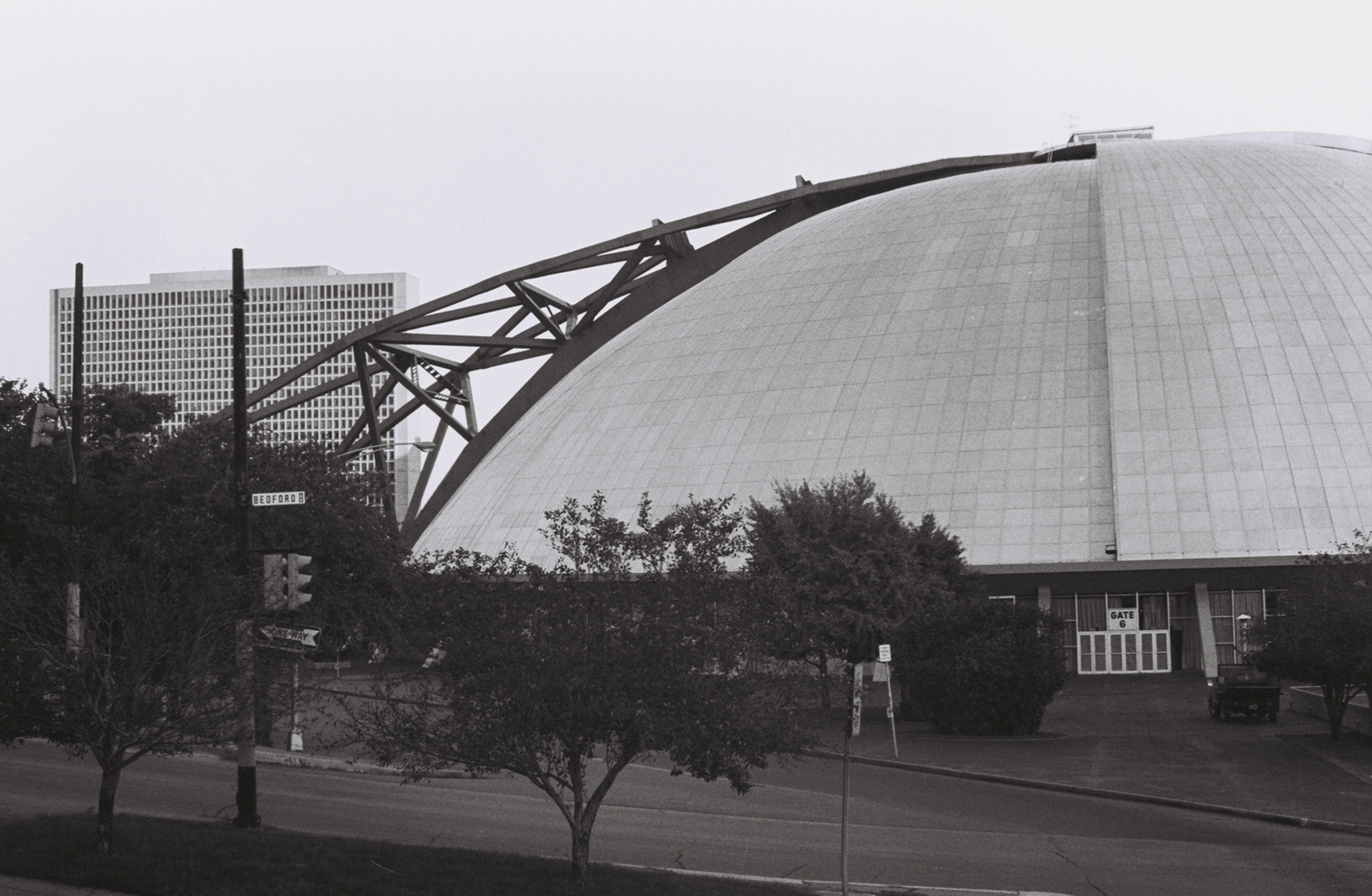
The Civic Arena in 1981 with the Washington Arms Apartments in the background

The $22 million ($239 million in 2025 dollars) arena was completed for the CLO in 1961. Mayor David L. Lawrence had publicly announced plans for a "civic theater" as early as February 8, 1953 after years of public pressure had built after CLO president, civic leader and owner of Kaufmann's department store Edgar J. Kaufmann announced his intention on December 1, 1948, to find a new home for the group. Funding was provided by a combination of public and private money, including grants from Allegheny County, the City of Pittsburgh, and Kaufmann. The arena's design incorporated 2,950 tons of stainless steel from Pittsburgh.

To make room for the arena, the city used eminent domain to displace 8,000 residents and 400 businesses from the lower Hill District, the cultural center of black life in Pittsburgh. Demolition began in 1955 and was finished by 1960. The last structure to be demolished was Bethel African Methodist Episcopal (AME) Church, built in 1908. The city charter prohibited using eminent domain on churches, but the Urban Redevelopment Authority of Pittsburgh was able to do so because it was not a city entity. On July 21, 1959, a steel strike halted work on the arena and delayed its opening date.

The Arena was designed for the CLO, which previously held productions at Pitt Stadium. The roof, which was supported by a 260-foot (79 m) arch, was free of internal support leaving no obstruction for the seats within. The roof, which had a diameter of 415 feet (126 m), was divided into eight sections. Six of the sections could fold underneath two—in 2½ minutes—making the Civic Arena the world's first major indoor sports stadium with a retractable roof. A total of 42 trucks mounted on 78 wheels, 30 of which were individually driven, supported and moved the six moveable sections. The trucks, gear motors and 480-volt AC motor drive that moved the roof sections were designed and manufactured by Heyl & Patterson Inc., a local specialist engineering firm.

The arena's capacity fluctuated depending on the event being hosted, but was increased due to additions between 1972 and 1991. The arena originally consisted only of lower bowl seating, but over time, upper decks were installed in the arena's "end zones" to increase capacity. In December 1999, Mellon Financial purchased the Arena's naming rights in a 10-year, $18 million agreement, which renamed the arena Mellon Arena.

The original center scoreboard was an electromechanical Nissen scoreboard with digital clock display, which appears in the 1979 movie The Fish That Saved Pittsburgh. That board was replaced during the 1986 renovations by an American Sign and Indicator scoreboard with a black-and-white three-line matrix animation/messageboard on each side, which appears in Sudden Death. White Way Sign created the arena's final center scoreboard, this one with a Sony JumboTron videoboard on each side, which remained for the arena's final sixteen years of use.

== History and events ==
On September 17, 1961, the Ice Capades hosted the arena's first event. Globally televised figure skating was hosted by the arena three times: The 1983 United States Figure Skating Championships, 1994 and 2004 editions of Skate America all having nearly week-long competitions.

=== Political events ===
Major political rallies were part of the early history of the arena. Former President Dwight Eisenhower appeared at a Republican rally on October 12, 1962. President Lyndon B. Johnson delivered a campaign address on October 27, 1964, and Sen. Barry Goldwater on October 29, 1964. On April 26, 1964, the 2-week long International Conference and Debate of the Methodist Church opened at the Arena. Vice President Nixon visited for a campaign rally at the arena on October 28, 1968. Henry Kissinger, Frank Borman, and Li Choh-ming visited for the University of Pittsburgh commencement on April 27, 1969.

=== Boxing matches ===
Cassius Clay vs. Charlie Powell on January 24, 1963, to a global television audience from the Civic Arena. Sugar Ray Robinson, Sonny Liston and Floyd Patterson also participated in boxing matches at the arena. On November 6, 1981, the globally televised World Heavyweight Title was fought at the arena between Larry Holmes and Renaldo Snipes with an undercard bout between Buster Douglas and David Bey.

=== Professional wrestling ===
- WWF SummerSlam – 1995
- WWF King of the Ring – 1998
- WWF Unforgiven – 2001
- WWE No Way Out – 2005
- WWE Armageddon – 2007
- WWE Bragging Rights – 2009

King of the Ring in 1998 is remembered for the Hell in a Cell match between Mick Foley and the Undertaker, where Foley fell from the top of the cell, suffering multiple injuries. Journalist Michael Landsberg called it "maybe the most famous match ever." In 2011, this incident was named as the number one "OMG!" incident in the WWE history. The final WWE event was a Monday Night Raw episode on May 10, 2010. Future professional wrestling events would later take place at the newly built Consol Energy Center (now PPG Paints Arena), located across the street.

=== Basketball ===
America's first high school basketball All-Star game, the Dapper Dan Roundball Classic was held at the arena annually between 1965 and 1992. The men's basketball programs of both of the city's NCAA Division I institutions, the University of Pittsburgh and Duquesne University, frequently used it either as a primary or secondary home court, and the last basketball game played at the arena was the two schools' annual rivalry game in 2009. Among the two schools, Duquesne made the most extensive use of the arena, using it as their home from 1964 until 1988. From 1984 to 2002, Pittsburgh used the arena for select games against popular opponents.

The Philadelphia 76ers, Pittsburgh Pipers, Pittsburgh Condors, Pittsburgh Rens, Pittsburgh Piranhas, and the Harlem Globetrotters hosted regular-season basketball games at the Arena. The Pipers won the 1968 ABA Finals in the venue, doing so in game seven over the New Orleans Buccaneers on May 4 by a score of 122–113. The first and second-round games of both the 1997 and 2002 NCAA Division I men's basketball tournaments were held at the Arena.

=== Tennis ===
The Pittsburgh Triangles of World TeamTennis hosted three Eastern Division Championships at the arena from 1974 through 1976 and the Bancroft Cup finals in 1975, winning the title on August 25, 1975, with paid attendance of 6,882.

=== Indoor soccer ===
The Pittsburgh Spirit Major Indoor Soccer League team also hosted matches at the arena.

=== Roller derby ===
Roller derby featuring the hosting New York Chiefs took place at the arena as well.

=== Gymnastics ===
Olympic gold medal winner Mary Lou Retton performed at the Aaena as part of the "Tour of Champions" event on November 2, 1990.

=== Notable musical events ===
The first rock concert at the arena was emceed by Porky Chedwick on May 11, 1962, as a DiCesare Engler production and featured Jackie Wilson, The Drifters, The Coasters, The Castelles, Jerry Butler, The Flamingos, The Angels, The Blue-Belles, and The Skyliners.

On September 14, 1964, the Beatles played the arena during their first United States tour. Opening acts were the Bill Black Combo, The Exciters, Clarence "Frogman" Henry, and Jackie DeShannon. A sell-out crowd of over 12,000 paid $5.90 to attend.

Motown came to the arena on March 6, 1969, with a Temptations concert.

On July 11, 1971, the world's first "authorized" production of Jesus Christ Superstar opened at the Civic Arena.

Black Sabbath played at the arena on February 1, 1974. Circus reported, "They broke the existing box office record by grossing $76,000."

On August 14, 1974, Canadian rock band Rush played the first show on their debut US tour with new drummer Neil Peart at the Civic Arena. They were opening for Uriah Heep at this show.

Pink Floyd was at the Civic Arena for The Dark Side of the Moon Tour on June 19, 1973.

Elvis Presley played his final New Year's Eve show at the Civic Arena on December 31, 1976, and played to a sellout on June 25 and 26, 1973. The arena has hosted other major concerts by every act from Frank Sinatra to Garth Brooks to Jimmy Page and Robert Plant.

By the mid-1970s the arena was among the premier venues in the nation, with Billboard magazine naming it the 9th best in the U.S. on December 30, 1976. Sly and the Family Stone, the Steve Miller Band, Grand Funk Railroad, Boz Scaggs, and the Beach Boys all played the arena in 1974.

The Bee Gees performed two concerts here on September 4–5, 1979 during their Spirits Having Flown Tour.

The Jacksons performed at Pittsburgh Civic Arena on August 13, 1981, during their Triumph Tour.

Guitarist Randy Rhoads played one of his final shows here with Ozzy Osbourne on February 2, 1982, until his passing 45 days later.

Duran Duran performed February 28, 1984, during a snowstorm and their Grammy win was announced onstage.

Pop superstar Michael Jackson performed three concerts at Pittsburgh Civic Arena on September 26, 27 and 28, 1988 during his Bad World Tour.

Pop singer Britney Spears performed at the arena once in 2001 on her Dream Within a Dream Tour and in 2009 to a sell-out crowd as a part of her Circus Tour.

Destiny's Child performed here on July 20, 2005, as part of their last tour 'Destiny Fulfilled... and Lovin' It'.

Josh Groban performed here in August 2007 as part of his 'Awake' tour.

Then-country singer Taylor Swift played a show in the arena during her Fearless Tour on October 1, 2009.

The Doors recorded their May 2, 1970, concert at the Civic Arena. This would be released 38 years later as Live in Pittsburgh 1970 aka Pittsburgh Civic Arena. It is considered by most music critics to be the Doors' best live recording.

The Grateful Dead played at the arena a total of nine times over a period spanning eighteen years - the first occasion on April 12, 1971, and the final one on April 3, 1989, which, along with the preceding night's concert was recorded and later released as a live album, entitled Download Series Volume 9. There was a riot by Deadheads on the final day of the concert, an event that was national news and featured by Kurt Loder on MTV News following the arrest of 500 people by the Pittsburgh Police.

The Rolling Stones performed three times in the arena: July 22, 1972; March 11, 1999; and January 10, 2003.

The final event was to be a Maxwell concert on July 10, 2010. However, the show was canceled. On June 8, 2010, the arena's management group, SMG, announced that James Taylor and Carole King's Troubadour Reunion Tour concert stop would be the final event at Mellon Arena on June 26, 2010.

=== Hockey ===
"It was beautiful, I can remember because the roof was round and white and pristine. It was like playing in a cloud. Imagine, it's almost like you're playing in the Vatican. It was very unique."

— Gene Ubriaco, former forward with the Pittsburgh Penguins and the Pittsburgh Hornets, recalling his playing days at the arena

==== AHL Hornets ====
The Pittsburgh Hornets, members of the American Hockey League (AHL), played home games at the Duquesne Gardens, located in the Oakland section of Pittsburgh. The team played 20 seasons in the Gardens prior to its demolition, which made room for an apartment building. The arena opened on September 17, 1961. With the arena available, the Hornets resumed play in the 1961–62 season and won the Calder Cup in the 1966–67 season.

==== Penguins ====
As part of the 1967 NHL expansion, the city of Pittsburgh was selected to host one of six new franchises. With a hockey seating capacity of 12,508, Pittsburgh's Mellon Arena was eight seats over the NHL's minimum seating benchmark. Due to its outward appearance, the arena was nicknamed "The Igloo", which led to the naming of the Penguins. The Penguins debuted at the Civic Arena on October 11, 1967, in a 2–1 loss to the Montreal Canadiens. Andy Bathgate scored the Penguins' first goal in the arena. It was the first NHL game played between an expansion team and an "Original Six" team. The Penguins won their first game at the arena on October 21, when they became the first expansion team to beat an "Original Six" franchise by beating the Chicago Blackhawks 4–2. On January 21, 1990, the Civic Arena hosted the 41st National Hockey League All-Star Game. Pittsburgh's Mario Lemieux scored three goals on his first three shots—the first coming 21 seconds into the game. He later scored a fourth goal and was named the game's Most Valuable Player. The arena also hosted the 1997 NHL entry draft, as well as games of the 1991, 1992, 2008, and 2009 Stanley Cup Final. The 2008 Finals marked the only occasion that the Stanley Cup was presented on Mellon Arena ice, after the Penguins were defeated by the Detroit Red Wings in six games.

The Penguins originally planned to wear a jersey patch to commemorate their final season in the Igloo, but it was later scrapped.

The Pittsburgh Penguins played their final regular season game at the Mellon Arena on April 8, 2010, when they defeated the New York Islanders 7–3. More than 50 former Penguins were in attendance for a pre-game ceremony and "team picture".

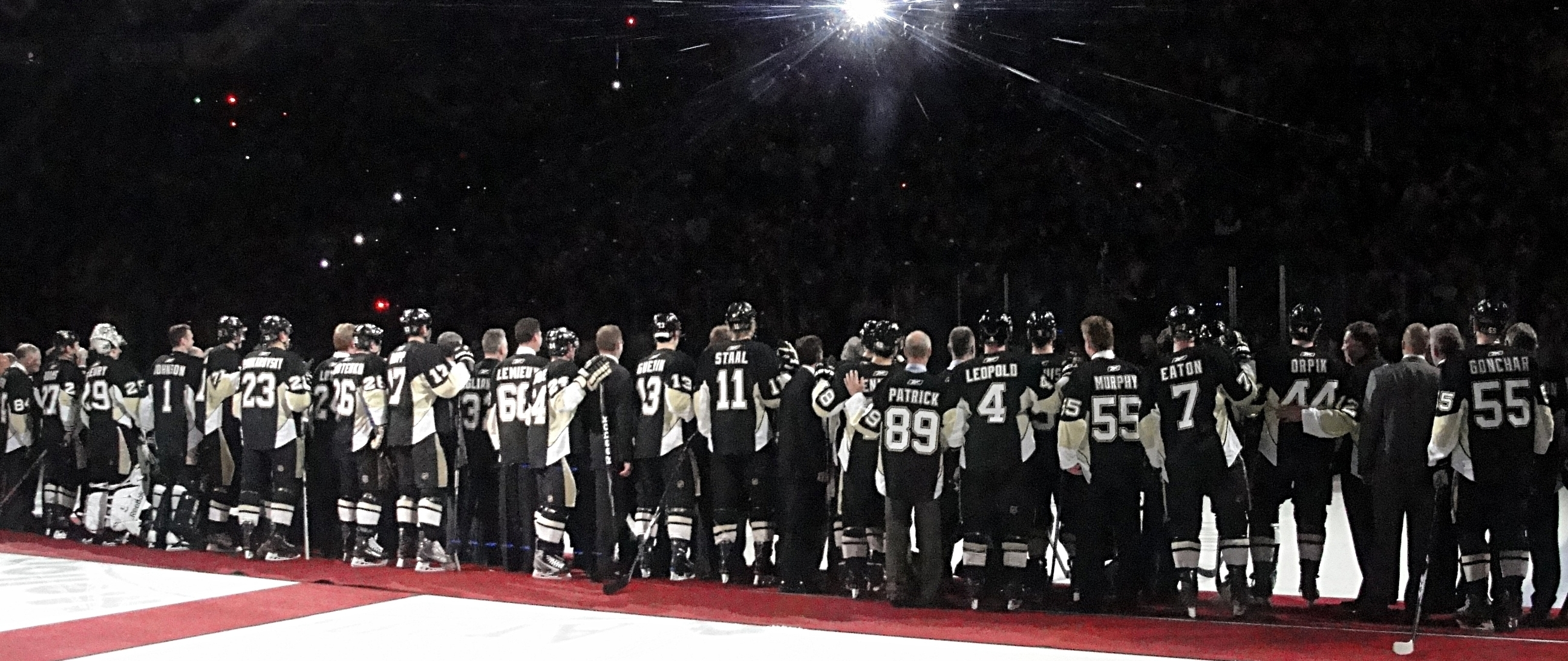
Pittsburgh Penguins players past and present were honored during a pregame ceremony prior to the final regular season game at Mellon Arena, April 8, 2010.

The Pittsburgh Penguins played their last game in Mellon Arena on May 12, 2010; a 5–2 defeat at the hands of the Montreal Canadiens to eliminate them from the 2010 Stanley Cup playoffs in game seven of the Eastern Conference Semifinals. This means the Canadiens both opened and closed the Penguins' career at the arena, handing out defeats at both events.

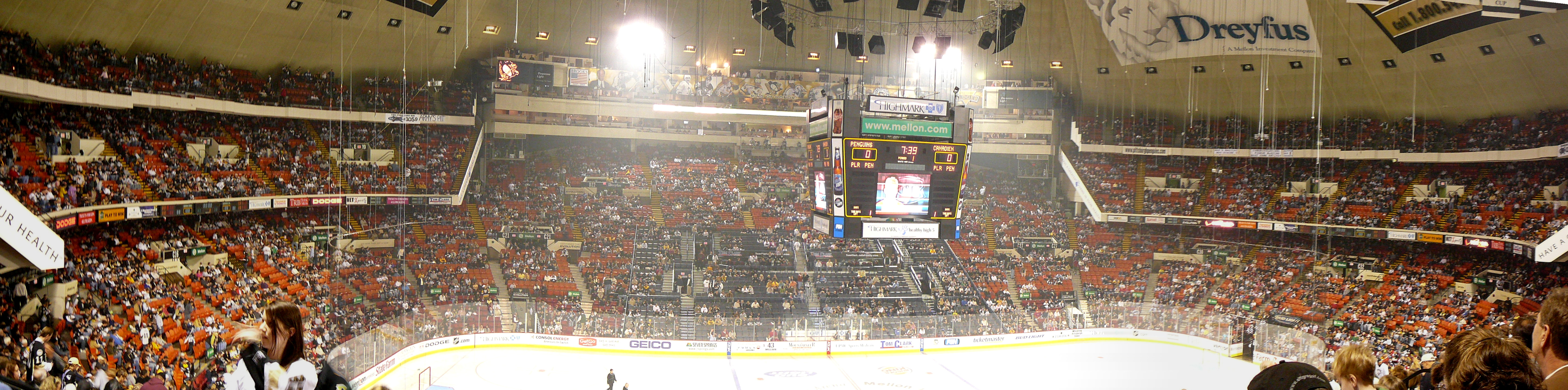
Panoramic view of the Civic Arena from D-Level in October 2007. The balconies on either end of this photo were not part of the original structure. The lower E-level balcony was added in 1975, and the upper F-level balcony was added in the 1993 season to expand seating capacity.

==== Seating capacity ====
The seating capacity of Civic Arena over time went as follows:

- 10,732 (1961–1967)
- 12,508 (1967–1968)
- 12,580 (1968–1972)
- 12,866 (1972–1973)
- 13,431 (1973–1974)
- 13,402 (1974–1975)
- 16,402 (1975–1976)
- 16,404 (1976–1977)
- 16,033 (1977–1987)
- 16,168 (1987–1988)
- 16,025 (1988–1990)
- 16,164 (1990–1993)
- 17,537 (1993–1994)
- 17,181 (1994–1997); 17,355 with standing room
- 16,958 (1997–2004); 17,148 with standing room
- 16,940 (2004–2010); 17,132 with standing room

=== Basketball ===
==== NCAA tournaments ====
The Civic Arena hosted the first and second round regional games of both the 1997 and 2002 NCAA men's tournament. The arena's successor Consol Energy Center also hosted them in 2012. It also hosted the women's first and second-round games in 2001.

==== Eastern Eight championships ====
For five seasons the arena hosted the Eastern 8 Conference men's basketball tournament every March. From 1978 to 1982 many of the current Big East Conference powers Atlantic 10 powers fought for their conference crown at the center. For the final season, the Mellon Arena hosted a record crowd of 16,056, the third-largest conference basketball championship crowd in the nation that year.

==== NBA regular season games ====
Between 1964 and 1973, the arena hosted 14 regular season NBA games, primarily as a satellite city for the Philadelphia 76ers. On February 24, 1967, at the arena, Wilt Chamberlain set the all-time record for consecutive NBA field goals as well as single NBA game field goal percentage, a record that still stands. On October 10, 1971, the world champion Milwaukee Bucks led by Kareem Abdul-Jabbar played the Condors at the arena. The arena also hosted dozens of pre-season NBA contests from the 1960s until 2009, many of them hosted by the nearby Cleveland Cavaliers, the closest NBA team to Pittsburgh.

==== ABA Pipers and Condors ====
The arena was the home of the American Basketball Association (ABA) Pittsburgh Pipers in 1967–68 and 1969–70 and the Pittsburgh Condors from 1970 to 1972. The team moved to Minneapolis for the 1968–69 season before returning. The team was disbanded following the 1971–72 season as the ABA struggled.

The Pipers were part of the inaugural season of the ABA in 1967–68, which quickly established a rivalry to the older National Basketball Association. On May 4, 1968, the Pipers, led by future Hall of Famer Connie Hawkins, claimed the ABA's first ever championship, defeating the New Orleans Buccaneers before a game seven sold-out crowd of 11,457 in the Civic Arena.

== Naming ==
In 1957, before the arena was opened, the under-construction building was officially known as the Civic Auditorium Amphitheater. By 1961, when it opened, Pittsburgh sign makers had decided that Civic Arena fit better on street signs, and the new, shorter name stuck. Still though, for the few years after it opened, it was sometimes referred to as the Civic Auditorium.

In the early days, The Pittsburgh Dome was also popular name choice, but nothing came of it.

In April 1988, city Councilman Mark Pollock proposed renaming it the Richard S. Caliguiri Arena, after the city's popular mayor who was diagnosed with amyloidosis. Caliguiri died a month later, and nothing came of this name, either.

Allegheny County Commissioner Pete Flaherty believed that officially renaming the arena The Igloo would bring marketing potential in 1992. Again, the Civic Arena name stayed.

In 1997, the Penguins sold naming rights to Allegheny Energy for $5 million, which would have renamed the arena Allegheny Energy Dome. However, the Penguins did not own the building nor its naming rights – the Sports Commission of Pittsburgh and Allegheny County did, and the deal fell through.

But, by 1999, this had changed. When Mario Lemieux bought the Penguins out of bankruptcy, the naming rights were also awarded to him. They then sold the rights to Mellon Financial for $18 million, and the arena was finally renamed Mellon Arena. The arena kept the name after Mellon merged with The Bank of New York to form The Bank of New York Mellon in 2007 and did not go through with the "BNY Mellon" rebranding like other buildings bearing the Bank of New York or Mellon name, such as One Mellon Center.

The Mellon Arena name was allowed to expire on August 1, 2010, with the building now vacant and the Penguins moving to the new Consol Energy Center (later renamed PPG Paints Arena) across the street. The closed building officially became the Civic Arena again.

== Replacement, debate, and demolition ==
At its closing in 2010, the Civic Arena was the oldest and third-smallest arena in the NHL by official capacity (the Islanders and Oilers arenas seated fewer). In later years, the arena's staff was forced to use space for multiple purposes never intended in the building's original design. The Penguins franchise agreed to a deal with city and state officials to fund a new home arena for the franchise in March 2007. The PPG Paints Arena is located across the street from the site of Civic Arena and has a higher seating capacity and a standard seating layout. The Penguins played their first game at PPG Paints Arena October 7, 2010.

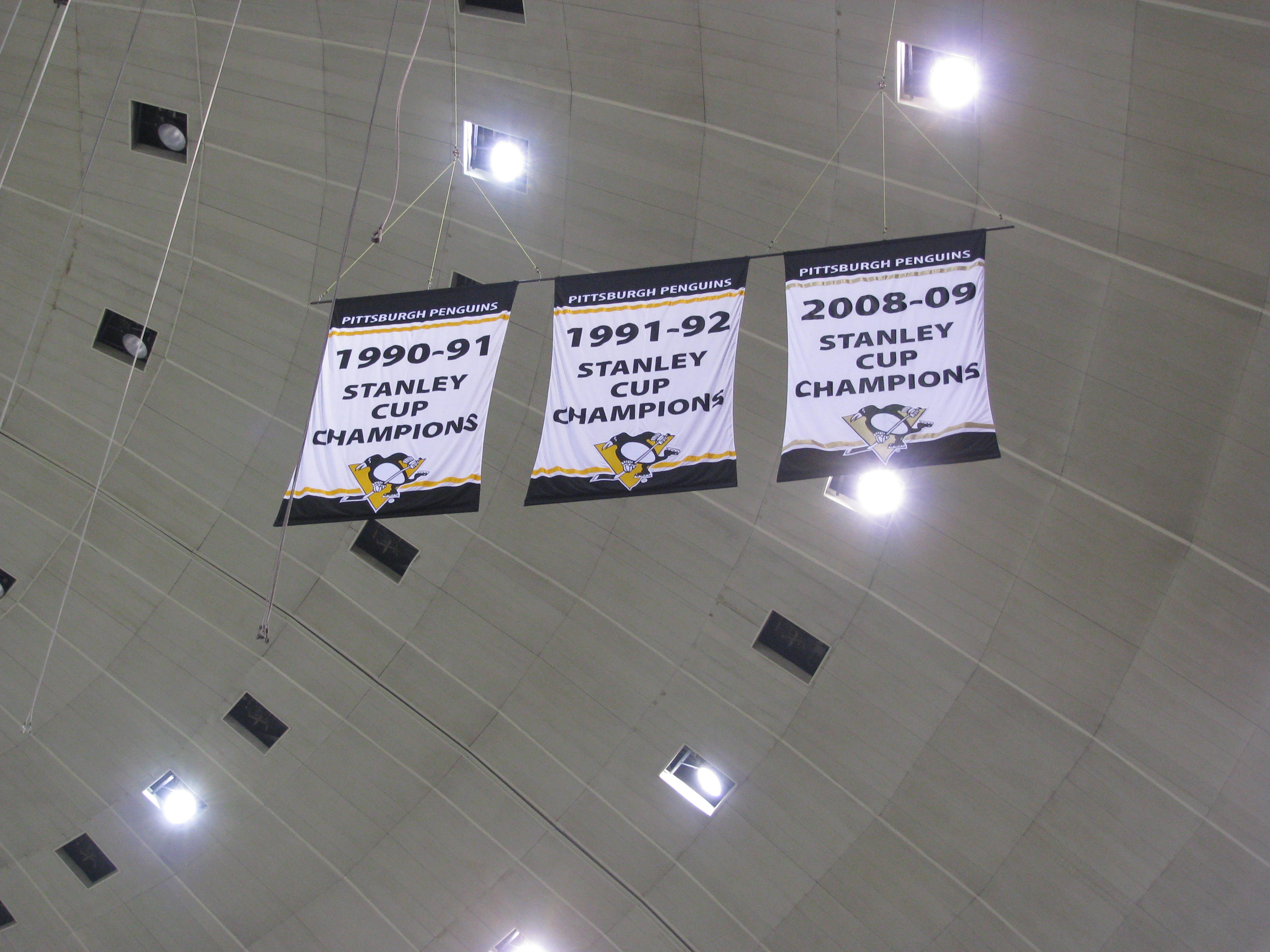
The Penguins' three Stanley Cup Championship Banners displayed at the arena in 2009–10

A March 2007 agreement between the SEA and the Penguins stated that Civic Arena would be demolished after completion of PPG Paints Arena in July 2010. During this time, SEA conducted a historic assessment of the arena. It was eligible to be considered for the National Register of Historic Places, mainly because of its unique, retractable dome. A private consultant to SEA was hired to conduct the survey. The consultant followed the state Historic and Museum Commission guidelines to determine whether demolishing the arena, or reusing it, would adversely affect historic structures or artifacts in the area. The recommendations of the consultant to SEA were scheduled to be delivered in June 2010.

The arena undergoing demolition in January 2012. At that time, all of the dome's stainless steel had been removed.

On September 16, 2010, the Allegheny County Sports and Exhibition Authority voted unanimously to demolish the Civic Arena. SEA Board chairman, State Senator Wayne Fontana, D–Brookline, said the board's decision will not be final unless someone comes forward with a better idea on the use of the arena. During the summer of 2010, workers removed asbestos from the building while a demolition plan was designed. The board also decided to sell assets (handled by the auction company Asset Auctions) from inside and would later award a demolition contract in February 2011. Proponents for retaining the building opposed the demolition decision in court, and attempted to seek landmark status.

On November 24, 2010, the building's demolition was delayed due to a last-minute nomination as a National Historic Landmark. Also, on January 5, 2011, the Pittsburgh Historic Review Commission voted 5–1 in favor for preliminary approval of the arena's historic nomination status. The vote paved the way for a formal hearing on the proposed designation on March 2. The HRC ultimately voted against landmark status on March 2. After also failing to get historic status approval from City Planning and City Council, Preservation Pittsburgh filed a federal lawsuit in another attempt to save the arena. The 3rd appeals court denied the lawsuit saying it had no jurisdiction in the matter, and demolition began Monday, September 26, 2011. The demolition was not a traditional type of demolition for sports arenas. In November 2011, the Penguins started selling Christmas ornaments crafted from the Civic Arena's steel roof. The team used the promotion to raise money for its charitable foundation. Grove City-based Wendell August Forge, the oldest and largest forge in the United States, created two types of ornaments: one with the arena and the Pittsburgh skyline and another with the arena with the Penguins' logo. The Penguins had originally planned to sell 6,000 ornaments, but due to demand, the team ended selling over 40,000 pieces. The arena was being disassembled over time, and originally expected to be complete in May 2012. However, demolition was finished early as the last panel of the retractable roof fell down on March 31, 2012. The site's footprint now serves as a surface lot for its successor arena, with the pre-1955 street grid re-established across the site as much as possible to allow future redevelopment.

== Use as a filming/recording location ==
Civic Arena has served as a filming location for several major Hollywood productions, including:

- The Fish That Saved Pittsburgh, a 1979 basketball film starring Flip Wilson, Stockard Channing, and Julius Erving as members of the fictional Pittsburgh Pisces NBA team
- Grateful Dead Download Series Volume 9, 1989
- Sudden Death, a 1995 film starring Jean-Claude Van Damme as a retired Pittsburgh firefighter who tries to save his children and the vice president from terrorists during the pivotal game seven of the Stanley Cup Final. In an intermission between the game's periods, the retractable-roof is opened for a fireworks show. It is opened again in the climax of the film by Van Damme's character.
- Rock Star, a 2001 film starring Mark Wahlberg as a musician heading to the Pittsburgh arena for a concert in 1987
- Zack and Miri Make a Porno, a 2008 Kevin Smith film; one of the final scenes is shot outside the arena.
- She's Out of My League, a 2010 romantic comedy; the arena and the Pittsburgh Penguins are featured as the backdrop to a date night.

The Russian movie Brother 2 was filmed at the arena. According to the script, the protagonist, Danila Borgov, arrived in the United States to help his friend's brother, Penguins player Dmitry Gromov (though events of the film take place in Chicago). Notable hockey players Aleksei Morozov, Jaromír Jágr and Darius Kasparaitis appeared in the movie.

The arena also served as the recording location for The Doors album Live in Pittsburgh 1970, and was a constant background representing the city and its sports franchises for its television stations, most prominently in the production card for national productions from PBS member station WQED.

Events and tenants
Preceded by Franchise created	Home of the Pittsburgh Penguins; 1967–2010	Succeeded by PPG Paints Arena
Preceded by Duquesne Gardens	Home of the Pittsburgh Hornets; 1961–1967	Succeeded by Franchise disbanded
Preceded by Fitzgerald Field House	Home of Duquesne University Men's Basketball; 1964–1988	Succeeded by Palumbo Center
Preceded by First arena	Home of the Pittsburgh Gladiators; 1987–1990	Succeeded by ThunderDome (Tampa Bay Storm)
Preceded by Inaugural event	Host of ArenaBowl; 1987	Succeeded by Rosemont Horizon
Preceded by Northlands Coliseum	Host of NHL All-Star Game; 1990	Succeeded by Chicago Stadium
Preceded by Kiel Center	Host of NHL entry draft 1997	Succeeded by Marine Midland Arena
Preceded by Charlotte Coliseum	Host of Bassmaster Classic; 2005	Succeeded by Silver Spurs Arena
Preceded by Colonial Life Arena	Host of Forrest Wood Cup; 2009	Succeeded by Arena at Gwinnett Center
Preceded by first	Host of WWE Bragging Rights; 2009	Succeeded by Target Center
