= Grateful Dead Download Series Volume 11 =

Live album by Grateful Dead
- Released: March 7, 2006
- Recorded: June 20, 1991
- Length: 215:30
- Label: Grateful Dead Productions

Grateful Dead chronology
Grateful Dead Download Series Volume 10 (2006)	Grateful Dead; Download Series Volume 11 (2006)	Grateful Dead Download Series Volume 12 (2006)

Download Series Volume 11 is a live album by the rock band Grateful Dead. It was released as a three-disc digital download on March 7, 2006. The album features the complete show performed by the band on June 20, 1991, at the Pine Knob Music Theatre in Clarkston, Michigan. Additionally, the first and third discs are supplemented by songs from the previous night's show at the same venue.

== Track listing ==
Disc one

First set:

1. "Touch of Grey" > (Garcia, Hunter) – 6:39
2. "Greatest Story Ever Told" (Weir, Hart, Hunter) – 4:44
3. "Peggy-O" (Trad. Arr. By Grateful Dead) – 7:47
4. "Mexicali Blues" > (Weir, Barlow) – 5:51
5. "Maggie's Farm" (Dylan) – 8:26
6. "Bird Song" (Garcia, Hunter) – 14:21

June 19, 1991 bonus tracks:

7. "Scarlet Begonias" > (Garcia, Hunter) – 14:16
8. "Fire on the Mountain" (Hart, Hunter) – 13:36

Disc two

Second set:

1. "Throwing Stones" > (Weir, Barlow) – 6:52
2. "Iko Iko" (Crawford, B. Hawkins, R. Hawkins, Johnson) – 9:51
3. "All Along the Watchtower" > (Dylan) – 7:40
4. "Standing on the Moon" > (Garcia, Hunter) – 10:36
5. "He's Gone" > (Garcia, Hunter) – 10:07
6. "Rhythm Devils" > (Hart, Kreutzmann) – 20:30
7. "Space" > (Garcia, Lesh, Weir) – 9:37

Disc three

1. "The Wheel" > (Garcia, Hunter) – 5:10
2. "I Need a Miracle" > (Weir, Barlow) – 5:04
3. "Wharf Rat" > (Garcia, Hunter) – 10:40
4. "Throwing Stones" > (Weir, Barlow) – 4:42
5. "Not Fade Away" (Petty, Hardin) – 11:02

Encore:

6. "Brokedown Palace" (Garcia, Hunter) – 5:08

June 19, 1991 bonus tracks:

7. "Stella Blue" > (Garcia, Hunter) – 10:08
8. "The Other One" > (Weir, Kreutzmann) – 7:51
9. "Johnny B. Goode" (Berry) – 4:52

== Personnel ==
Grateful Dead

- Jerry Garcia – lead guitar, vocals
- Mickey Hart – drums, percussion
- Bruce Hornsby – piano, accordion, vocals
- Bill Kreutzmann – drums, percussion
- Phil Lesh – electric bass
- Bob Weir – rhythm guitar, vocals
- Vince Welnick – keyboards, vocals
