= Grateful Dead Download Series Volume 8 =

Live album by Grateful Dead
- Released: December 6, 2005
- Recorded: December 10, 1973
- Length: 149:15
- Label: Grateful Dead Productions

Grateful Dead chronology
Fillmore West 1969 (2005)	Grateful Dead; Download Series Volume 8 (2005)	Grateful Dead Download Series: Family Dog at the Great Highway (2005)

Download Series Volume 8 is a live album by the rock band the Grateful Dead. It was released as a digital download on December 6, 2005, and features most of the concert performed by the band on December 10, 1973, at the Charlotte Coliseum in Charlotte, North Carolina.

The songs omitted from the album are "Jack Straw", "Tennessee Jed", "El Paso", and "Brown-Eyed Women" from the first set, and "Me and My Uncle" from the second set.

Volume 8 was mastered in HDCD format by Jeffrey Norman.

== Track listing ==
Disc one

First set:

1. "Bertha" (Garcia, Hunter) - 7:01
2. "Mexicali Blues" (Weir, Barlow) - 4:12
3. "Deal" (Garcia, Hunter) - 4:50
4. "Big River" (Cash) - 4:54
5. "Don't Ease Me In" (Trad. Arr. By Grateful Dead) - 4:03
6. "Playing in the Band" (Weir, Hart, Hunter) - 20:52

Second set:

7. "Promised Land" (Berry) - 3:40
8. "Peggy-O" (Trad. Arr. By Grateful Dead) - 6:03
9. "Row Jimmy" (Garcia, Hunter) - 9:49
10. "Me and Bobby McGee" (Kristofferson, Foster) - 5:59
11. "Big Railroad Blues" (Lewis, Arr. By Grateful Dead) - 4:26

Disc two

1. "Truckin' " > (Garcia, Lesh, Weir, Hunter) - 9:00
2. "Nobody's Fault But Mine" > (Johnson) - 5:07
3. "Eyes of the World" > (Garcia, Hunter) -13:20
4. "Brokedown Palace" (Garcia, Hunter) - 6:23
5. "China Cat Sunflower" > (Garcia, Hunter) - 5:16
6. "I Know You Rider" (Trad. Arr. By Grateful Dead) - 8:41
7. "Sugar Magnolia" > (Weir, Hunter) - 6:16
8. "Goin' Down the Road Feeling Bad" > (Trad. Arr. By Grateful Dead) - 8:46
9. "Sunshine Daydream" (Weir, Hunter) - 3:11

Encore:

10. "Casey Jones" (Garcia, Hunter) - 7:26

== Personnel ==
Grateful Dead

- Jerry Garcia – lead guitar, vocals
- Keith Godchaux – piano
- Bill Kreutzmann – drums
- Phil Lesh – electric bass
- Bob Weir – rhythm guitar, vocals

Production

- Kidd Candelario – recording
- Jeffrey Norman – mastering
