= Grateful Dead Download Series: Family Dog at the Great Highway =

Live album by Grateful Dead
- Released: December 6, 2005
- Recorded: February 4, 1970; October 5, 1970; December 31, 1970
- Venue: Family Dog at the Great Highway, San Francisco, CA; Winterland, San Francisco
- Length: 79:43
- Label: Grateful Dead Productions

Grateful Dead chronology
| Grateful Dead Download Series Volume 8 (2005) | Grateful Dead Download Series: Family Dog at the Great Highway (2005) | Grateful Dead Download Series Volume 9 (2006) |

Grateful Dead Download Series: Family Dog at the Great Highway is a live album by the rock band Grateful Dead. It was released as a digital download on December 6, 2005, alongside Grateful Dead Download Series Volume 8. The album was recorded on February 4, 1970, at the Family Dog at the Great Highway in San Francisco, California. Three of the songs (tracks 1,4, and 5) were broadcast on a NET television special at the time.

Three bonus tracks also date from 1970 in San Francisco. "Dancing in the Streets" is from October 5, 1970; "Monkey and the Engineer" and "Good Lovin'" are from December 31, 1970 (see The Closing of Winterland for another track from the latter concert).

Note that this album should not be confused with the similarly titled Family Dog at the Great Highway, San Francisco, CA 4/18/70, which was recorded the same year at the same venue.

== Track listing ==
1. "Hard to Handle" (Otis Redding, Allen Jones, Al Bell) – 6:43
2. "Black Peter" (Jerry Garcia, Robert Hunter) – 9:33
3. "Me and My Uncle" (John Phillips) – 3:29
4. "China Cat Sunflower" (Garcia, Hunter) – 5:04 →
5. "I Know You Rider" (traditional, arranged by Grateful Dead) – 4:53
6. "St. Stephen" (Garcia, Phil Lesh, Hunter) – 2:18 →
7. "Not Fade Away" (Charles Hardin, Norman Petty) – 6:58 →
8. "St. Stephen" (Garcia, Lesh, Hunter) – 2:22 →
9. "In the Midnight Hour" (Wilson Pickett, Steve Cropper) – 8:16

Bonus tracks

10. "Dancing in the Street" (Marvin Gaye, William "Mickey" Stevenson, Ivy Jo Hunter) – 12:14
  - October 5, 1970 at Winterland, San Francisco
11. "Monkey and the Engineer" (Jesse Fuller) – 2:45
12. "Good Lovin' " (Artie Resnick, Rudy Clark) – 15:08
  - December 31, 1970 at Winterland, San Francisco

== Personnel ==
Grateful Dead

- Jerry Garcia – lead guitar, vocals
- Mickey Hart – drums, percussion
- Bill Kreutzmann – drums
- Phil Lesh – bass, backing vocals
- Ron "Pigpen" McKernan – organ, percussion, harmonica, vocals
- Bob Weir – rhythm guitar, vocals

Production

- Jeffrey Norman – mastering
