= Dave's Picks Volume 5 =

Live album by Grateful Dead
- Released: February 1, 2013
- Recorded: November 17, 1973
- Venue: Pauley Pavilion
- Genre: Rock
- Label: Rhino
- Producer: Grateful Dead

Grateful Dead chronology
Winterland: May 30th 1971 (2012)	Dave's Picks Volume 5 (2013)	Dave's Picks Volume 6 (2013)

Dave's Picks Volume 5 is a three-CD live album by the rock band the Grateful Dead. It contains the complete concert recorded on November 17, 1973 at Pauley Pavilion, on the campus of UCLA in Los Angeles, California. It was released on February 1, 2013.

Dave's Picks Volume 5 is the fifth in the Dave's Picks series of Grateful Dead archival releases, the successor to the Road Trips series, and was produced as a limited edition of 13,000 numbered copies.

The album liner notes were written by former basketball player, sportscaster, and UCLA alumnus Bill Walton.

Dave's Picks Volume 5 was released as a five-disc LP on August 29, 2025.

== Critical reception ==
On All About Jazz, Doug Collette wrote, "Recorded at UCLA in November 1973, the Dead plays with uncommon poise and good humor, whether skipping lightly through succinct performances such as 'Me and My Uncle' or allowing itself to flow in and out of an extremely elongated circular passage including segues in and out of 'Playing in the Band', 'Uncle John's Band' and 'Morning Dew'. Indicative of sharp collective instincts, there's a light touch in the musicianship that guides the sextet through transitions like those in 'Here Comes Sunshine' with nary a stumble. Meanwhile, the overall dynamics here are exquisite."

On Allmusic, Fred Thomas said, "[Dave's Picks Volume 5] comes from a particularly strong period in the band's touring career, and this show itself is already legendary in certain Deadhead circles. While in their later days it would become increasingly rare for the Dead to tour in support of a new studio album, this show came not long after the release of Wake of the Flood, and saw the group going through extended versions of material from that album like 'Here Comes Sunshine' and 'Eyes of the World', the latter of which would grow to become a staple of the band's shows. Also included in the massive set list are spirited versions of classic Dead tracks like 'Stella Blue' and 'Uncle John's Band'."

== Track listing ==
=== Disc 1 ===
First set:

1. "Me and My Uncle" (John Phillips) – 3:18
2. "Here Comes Sunshine" (Jerry Garcia, Robert Hunter) – 11:53
3. "Looks Like Rain" (Bob Weir, John Perry Barlow) – 7:24
4. "Deal" (Garcia, Hunter) – 5:08
5. "Mexicali Blues" (Weir, Barlow) – 3:39
6. "Tennessee Jed" (Garcia, Hunter) – 7:58
7. "The Race Is On" (George Jones) – 3:27
8. "China Cat Sunflower" (Garcia, Hunter) > – 9:10
9. "I Know You Rider" (traditional, arranged by Grateful Dead) – 5:44
10. "Big River" (Johnny Cash) – 5:22
11. "Brown-Eyed Women" (Garcia, Hunter) – 5:27
12. "Around and Around" (Chuck Berry) – 5:10

=== Disc 2 ===
Second set:

1. "Row Jimmy" (Garcia, Hunter) – 9:39
2. "Jack Straw" (Weir, Hunter) – 5:18
3. "Ramble On Rose" (Garcia, Hunter) – 6:37
4. "Playing in the Band" > (Weir, Mickey Hart, Hunter) – 15:02
5. "Uncle John's Band" > (Garcia, Hunter) – 7:29
6. "Morning Dew" > (Bonnie Dobson, Tim Rose) – 13:54
7. "Uncle John's Band" > (Garcia, Hunter) – 1:44
8. "Playing in the Band" (Weir, Hart, Hunter) – 11:37

=== Disc 3 ===
1. "Stella Blue" (Garcia, Hunter) – 7:29
2. "El Paso" (Marty Robbins) – 4:29
3. "Eyes Of The World" > – 14:18
4. "Sugar Magnolia" (Weir, Hunter) – 9:52

Encore:

5. "Casey Jones" (Garcia, Hunter) – 6:54

== Personnel ==
=== Grateful Dead ===
- Jerry Garcia – lead guitar, vocals
- Donna Jean Godchaux – vocals
- Keith Godchaux – keyboards
- Bill Kreutzmann – drums
- Phil Lesh – electric bass, vocals
- Bob Weir – rhythm guitar, vocals

=== Production ===
- Produced by Grateful Dead
- Produced for release by David Lemieux
- Executive producer: Mark Pinkus
- Associate producer: Doran Tyson
- CD mastering: Jeffrey Norman
- Recording: Kidd Candelario
- Art direction and design: Steve Vance
- Cover art: Timothy Truman
- Tape research: Michael Wesley Johnson
- Archival research: Nicholas Meriwether
- Photos: Grant Gouldon, Larry Hulst, Bill Walton
- Liner notes essay "The Blue and Golden Road": Bill Walton
