= Grateful Dead Download Series Volume 10 =

Live album by Grateful Dead
- Released: February 7, 2006
- Recorded: July 21, 1972
- Length: 231:16
- Label: Grateful Dead Productions

Grateful Dead chronology
Grateful Dead Download Series Volume 9 (2006)	Grateful Dead; Download Series Volume 10 (2006)	Grateful Dead Download Series Volume 11 (2006)

Download Series Volume 10 is a live album by the rock band Grateful Dead. It was released as a three-disc digital download on February 7, 2006. The album features nearly the entire concert performed by the band on July 21, 1972, at the Paramount Northwest Theatre in Seattle, Washington.

The album is missing the opener, Chuck's Berry's "Promised Land". Additionally, the version of "Weather Report Suite: Prelude" that follows "Casey Jones" is truncated and contains errors. After their flawed performance, Bob Weir comments, "Well anyway, what we're going to do next is history." To supplement the third disc, two songs from the first set and three from the second set of the following night's show at the same venue are included. Volume 10 was mastered in HDCD format by Jeffrey Norman.

== Track listing ==
Disc one

First set:

1. "Sugaree" (Garcia, Hunter) - 7:57
2. "Black-Throated Wind" (Weir, Barlow) - 6:57
3. "Cumberland Blues" (Garcia, Lesh, Hunter) - 5:41
4. "Me and Bobby McGee" (Kristofferson, Foster) - 5:44
5. "Loser" (Garcia, Hunter) - 6:50
6. "Mexicali Blues" (Weir, Barlow) - 3:36
7. "China Cat Sunflower" > (Garcia, Hunter) - 5:01
8. "I Know You Rider" (Trad. Arr. By Grateful Dead) - 6:56
9. "Beat It On Down the Line" (Fuller) - 3:28
10. "Stella Blue" (Garcia, Hunter) - 7:43
11. "Playing In The Band" (Weir, Hart, Hunter) - 11:32
12. "Tennessee Jed" (Garcia, Hunter) - 8:09

Disc two

Second set:

1. "Casey Jones" (Garcia, Hunter) - 8:09
2. "Me and My Uncle" (Phillips) - 3:15
3. "Deal" (Garcia, Hunter) - 5:27
4. "Jack Straw" (Weir, Hunter) - 5:15
5. "He's Gone" > (Garcia, Hunter) - 9:16
6. "Truckin' " > (Garcia, Lesh, Weir, Hunter) - 10:31
7. "Drums" > (Kreutzmann) - 5:44
8. "The Other One" > (Weir, Kreutzmann) - 22:23
9. "Comes A Time" (Garcia, Hunter) - 7:28

Disc three

1. "Sugar Magnolia" (Weir, Hunter) - 6:58
2. "Ramble On Rose" (Garcia, Hunter) - 6:26
3. "Goin' Down The Road Feeling Bad" > (Trad. Arr. By Grateful Dead) - 5:21
4. "Not Fade Away" (Hardin, Petty) - 3:19

July 22, 1972 bonus tracks:

5. "You Win Again" (Williams) - 4:06
6. "Bird Song" (Garcia, Hunter) - 9:35
7. "Playing In The Band" (Weir, Hart, Hunter) - 13:47
8. "Morning Dew" (Dobson, Rose) - 12:04
9. "Uncle John's Band" (Garcia, Hunter) - 7:36
10. "One More Saturday Night" (Weir) - 5:02

== Personnel ==
Grateful Dead

- Jerry Garcia – lead guitar, vocals
- Donna Jean Godchaux – vocals
- Keith Godchaux – piano
- Bill Kreutzmann – drums
- Phil Lesh – electric bass
- Bob Weir – rhythm guitar, vocals

Production

- Jeffrey Norman – mastering
