= Grateful Dead Download Series Volume 12 =

Live album by Grateful Dead
- Released: April 4, 2006
- Recorded: April 17, 1969
- Length: 120:43
- Label: Grateful Dead Productions

Grateful Dead chronology
Grateful Dead Download Series Volume 11 (2006)	Grateful Dead; Download Series Volume 12 (2006)	Live at the Cow Palace (2007)

Grateful Dead Download Series Volume 12 is the twelfth installment in a series of live digital downloads of by Grateful Dead Productions. It was released by on April 4, 2006, and features a complete two-disc show performed by the Grateful Dead on April 17, 1969 at Washington University in St. Louis. The second disc includes two bonus tracks from a rehearsal at the Avalon Ballroom on January 23, 1969.

Volume 12 was mastered in HDCD by Jeffery Norman.

== Track listing ==
Disc one

1. "Hard To Handle" (Redding, Jones, Isbell) - 7:18
2. "Morning Dew" (Dobson, Tim Rose) - 10:21
3. "Good Morning Little Schoolgirl" (Sonny Boy Williamson) - 9:16
4. "Dark Star" > (Jerry Garcia, Mickey Hart, Bill Kreutzmann, Phil Lesh, Ron "Pigpen" McKernan, Bob Weir, Robert Hunter) - 21:35
5. "St. Stephen" > (Garcia, Lesh, Hunter) - 2:34
6. "I Know It's A Sin" > (J. & M. Reed) - 3:45
7. "St. Stephen" > (Garcia, Lesh, Hunter) - 3:01
8. "Turn On Your Lovelight" (Malone, Scott) - 19:13

Disc two

1. "That's It for the Other One" > (Garcia, Kreutzmann, Weir) - 22:44
2. "Caution (Do Not Stop On Tracks)" (Grateful Dead) - 1:53
3. "The Eleven" (Lesh, Hunter) - 13:57
4. "Dupree's Diamond Blues" (Garcia, Hunter) - 5:06

3 and 4 are bonus tracks from Avalon Ballroom, January 23, 1969 rehearsals.

== Personnel ==
Grateful Dead

- Tom Constanten - keyboards
- Jerry Garcia - lead guitar, vocals
- Mickey Hart - drums
- Bill Kreutzmann - drums
- Phil Lesh - electric bass
- Ron "Pigpen" McKernan - percussion, harmonica, vocals
- Bob Weir - rhythm guitar, vocals

Production

- Owsley "Bear" Stanley - recording
- Jeffrey Norman - mastering
