= Live at the Cow Palace =

Live album by Grateful Dead
- Released: January 19, 2007
- Recorded: December 31, 1976
- Genre: Rock
- Length: 190:25 bonus disc: 68:52
- Label: Rhino

Grateful Dead chronology
Grateful Dead Download Series Volume 12 (2006)	Live at the Cow Palace (2007)	Three from the Vault (2007)

Professional ratings
Review scores
Source	Rating
All About Jazz	(favorable)
Allmusic	3.5/5 stars
The Music Box	4/5 stars
NeuFutur	6/10 stars

Live at the Cow Palace is a live album by the American rock band the Grateful Dead. It was recorded at the Cow Palace in Daly City, California, on New Year's Eve, 1976. Released in 2007, it was the first Grateful Dead album produced under contract with Rhino Records. Pre-orders through the Grateful Dead Store received a bonus disc. The album was created by remixing and remastering the original 24-track concert soundboard tapes.

== Track listing ==
Disc one

First set:

1. "The Promised Land" (Chuck Berry) – 4:50
2. "Bertha" (Robert Hunter, Jerry Garcia) – 6:34
3. "Mama Tried" (Merle Haggard) – 3:01
4. "They Love Each Other" (Hunter, Garcia) – 7:15
5. "Looks Like Rain" (John Barlow, Bob Weir) – 7:41
6. "Deal" (Hunter, Garcia) – 5:34
7. "Playing In The Band" (Hunter, Mickey Hart, Weir) – 23:08

Disc two

Second set:

1. "Sugar Magnolia" > (Hunter, Weir) – 8:49
2. "Eyes of the World" > (Hunter, Garcia) – 12:26
3. "Wharf Rat" > (Hunter, Garcia) – 13:28
4. "Good Lovin'" > (Artie Resnick, Rudy Clark) – 5:11
5. "Samson and Delilah" (traditional, arr. Weir) – 9:48
6. "Scarlet Begonias" (Hunter, Garcia) – 11:55

Disc three

Second set, continued:

1. "Around and Around" (Berry) – 8:10
2. "Help On The Way" > (Hunter, Garcia) – 5:12
3. "Slipknot!" > (Garcia, Keith Godchaux, Bill Kreutzmann, Phil Lesh, Weir) – 8:51
4. "Drums" > (Hart, Kreutzmann) – 3:04
5. "Not Fade Away" > (Buddy Holly, Norman Petty) – 11:04
6. "Morning Dew" (Bonnie Dobson, Tim Rose) – 15:11

First encore:

7. "One More Saturday Night" (Weir) – 5:07

Second encore:

8. "Uncle John's Band" (Hunter, Garcia) – 8:18
9. "We Bid You Goodnight" (trad., arr. Grateful Dead) – 3:26

Spirit of '76: Live at the Cow Palace Bonus Disc

1. "The Music Never Stopped" (Weir/Barlow) – 5:49 – Boston Music Hall, Boston, MA 6/9/76
2. "Crazy Fingers" (Garcia/Hunter) – 11:18 – Boston Music Hall, Boston, MA 6/9/76
3. "Let It Grow" (Weir/Barlow) – 12:54 – Riverfront Coliseum, Cincinnati, OH 10/2/76
4. "Might As Well" (Garcia/Hunter) – 6:04 – Riverfront Coliseum, Cincinnati, OH 10/2/76
5. "Playing in the Band" > (Weir/Hart/Hunter) – 11:56 – College of William & Mary, Williamsburg, VA 9/24/76
6. "Supplication" > (Weir/Barlow) – 6:06 – College of William & Mary, Williamsburg, VA 9/24/76
7. "Playing in the Band" (Weir/Hart/Hunter) – 3:35 – College of William & Mary, Williamsburg, VA 9/24/76
8. "Scarlet Begonias" (Garcia/Hunter) – 11:09 – Mershon Auditorium, Columbus, OH 9/30/76

== Personnel ==
- Jerry Garcia – guitar, vocals
- Donna Godchaux – vocals
- Keith Godchaux – piano
- Mickey Hart – drums
- Bill Kreutzmann – drums
- Phil Lesh – electric bass
- Bob Weir – guitar, vocals
