= Winterland: May 30th 1971 =

Live album by Grateful Dead
- Released: November 23, 2012
- Recorded: May 30, 1971
- Genre: Rock
- Length: 68:29
- Label: Rhino
- Producer: Grateful Dead

Grateful Dead chronology
Dave's Picks Volume 4 (2012)	Winterland: May 30th 1971 (2012)	Dave's Picks Volume 5 (2013)

Winterland: May 30th 1971 is an album by the rock group the Grateful Dead. As the name suggests, it was recorded live at the Winterland Ballroom in San Francisco, California on May 30, 1971. The album includes most of the second set from that concert, as well as the encore. It was produced only as a two-disc vinyl LP, in a limited edition of 7,500 copies, and was released on November 23, 2012, in conjunction with Record Store Day.

== Track listing ==
Side one

1. "Sugar Magnolia" (Bob Weir, Robert Hunter) – 7:09
2. "Cumberland Blues" (Jerry Garcia, Phil Lesh, Hunter) – 5:38
3. "Big Boss Man" (Al Smith, Luther Dixon) – 6:01

Side two

1. "Me and My Uncle" (John Phillips) – 3:33
2. "Deal" (Garcia, Hunter) – 5:47
3. "Truckin'" (Garcia, Lesh, Weir, Hunter) – 8:28

Side three

1. "Turn On Your Lovelight" (Joseph Scott, Deadric Malone) – 15:32

Side four

1. "Uncle John's Band" (Garcia, Hunter) – 6:46
2. "Casey Jones" (Garcia, Hunter) – 5:26
3. "Johnny B. Goode" (Chuck Berry) – 4:09

== Personnel ==
Grateful Dead

- Jerry Garcia – lead guitar, vocals
- Bill Kreutzmann – drums
- Phil Lesh – electric bass, vocals
- Ron "Pigpen" McKernan – organ, harmonica, percussion, vocals
- Bob Weir – rhythm guitar, vocals

Production

- Produced by Grateful Dead
- Produced for release by David Lemieux and Mason Williams
- Executive producer: Mark Pinkus
- Mastering: Jeffrey Norman, Chris Bellman
- Art direction and design: Masaki Koike
- Liner notes essay "Let it Shine, Shine, Shine...": Blair Jackson

== Concert set list ==
According to DeadBase XI, the following is the set list for the May 30, 1971 concert at Winterland. This set list is presumed to be incomplete, as it does not include "Big Boss Man".

- First set: "Bertha", "Me and Bobby McGee", "The Rub", "Loser", "Playing in the Band", "Next Time You See Me", "Morning Dew", "Promised Land", "Good Lovin'"
- Second set: "China Cat Sunflower" > "I Know You Rider", "Sugar Magnolia"*, "Cumberland Blues"*, "Me and My Uncle"*, "Deal"*, "Truckin'"* > "Turn On Your Lovelight"*, "Uncle John's Band"*, "Casey Jones"*
- Encore: "Johnny B. Goode"*

* Included in Winterland: May 30th 1971
