= The Warner Bros. Studio Albums =

Box set by Grateful Dead
- Released: September 21, 2010
- Recorded: 1967–1970
- Genre: Rock
- Label: Rhino

Grateful Dead chronology
Formerly the Warlocks (2010)	The Warner Bros. Studio Albums (2010)	Road Trips Volume 4 Number 1 (2010)

The Warner Bros. Studio Albums is a box set of five vinyl LPs by the rock group the Grateful Dead. It is a reissue of their first five studio albums: The Grateful Dead (1967), Anthem of the Sun (1968), Aoxomoxoa (1969), Workingman's Dead (1970), and American Beauty (1970). The box set was released by Rhino Records on September 21, 2010.

The Warner Bros. Studio Albums features the original mixes for Anthem of the Sun and Aoxomoxoa. Anthem of the Sun was remixed and reissued in 1972. The original mix had been unavailable on vinyl since that time, although it was reissued on CD in 2001 for the Golden Road box set, and in 2003 as a stand-alone album. Aoxomoxoa was remixed and reissued in 1971, and the original mix had been unavailable on either vinyl or CD since then.

The box set contains new pressings of the five albums, which were intended to have audiophile-level sound quality. The records were produced on 180-gram vinyl using the original master recordings.

The Warner Bros. Studio Albums also contains a reissue of the "Dark Star"/"Born Cross-Eyed" seven-inch single. Additionally it includes an illustrated booklet, and a reproduction of a promotional poster for the first album.

== Track listing ==
The Grateful Dead
Side one

1. "The Golden Road (To Unlimited Devotion)" (Jerry Garcia, Bill Kreutzmann, Phil Lesh, Ron McKernan, Bob Weir)
2. "Beat It On Down the Line" (Jesse Fuller)
3. "Good Morning Little School Girl" (Sonny Boy Williamson)
4. "Cold Rain and Snow" (Garcia, Kreutzmann, Lesh, McKernan, Weir)
5. "Sittin' on Top of the World" (Walter Jacobs, Lonnie Carter)
6. "Cream Puff War" (Garcia)

Side two

7. "Morning Dew" (Bonnie Dobson, Tim Rose)
8. "New, New Minglewood Blues" (traditional, arranged by Garcia)
9. "Viola Lee Blues" (Noah Lewis)

Anthem of the Sun
Side one

1. "That's It for the Other One"
  - "Cryptical Envelopment" (Garcia)
  - "Quadlibet for Tenderfeet" (Garcia, Kreutzmann, Lesh, McKernan, Weir)
  - "The Faster We Go, the Rounder We Get" (Kreutzmann, Weir)
  - "We Leave the Castle" (Tom Constanten)
2. "New Potato Caboose" (Lesh, Robert Petersen)
3. "Born Cross-Eyed" (Weir)

Side two

4. "Alligator" (Lesh, McKernan, Robert Hunter)
5. "Caution (Do Not Stop on Tracks)" (Garcia, Kreutzmann, Lesh, McKernan, Weir)

Aoxomoxoa
Side one

1. "St. Stephen" (Garcia, Lesh, Hunter)
2. "Dupree's Diamond Blues" (Garcia, Hunter)
3. "Rosemary" (Garcia, Hunter)
4. "Doin' That Rag" (Garcia, Hunter)
5. "Mountains of the Moon" (Garcia, Hunter)

Side two

6. "China Cat Sunflower" (Garcia, Hunter)
7. "What's Become of the Baby" (Garcia, Hunter)
8. "Cosmic Charlie" (Garcia, Hunter)

Workingman's Dead
Side one

1. "Uncle John's Band" (Garcia, Hunter)
2. "High Time" (Garcia, Hunter)
3. "Dire Wolf" (Garcia, Hunter)
4. "New Speedway Boogie" (Garcia, Hunter)

Side two

5. "Cumberland Blues" (Garcia, Lesh, Hunter)
6. "Black Peter" (Garcia, Hunter)
7. "Easy Wind" (Hunter)
8. "Casey Jones" (Garcia, Hunter)

American Beauty
Side one

1. "Box of Rain" (Lesh, Hunter)
2. "Friend of the Devil" (Garcia, John Dawson, Hunter)
3. "Sugar Magnolia" (Weir, Hunter)
4. "Operator" (McKernan)
5. "Candyman" (Garcia, Hunter)

Side two

6. "Ripple" (Garcia, Hunter)
7. "Brokedown Palace" (Garcia, Hunter)
8. "Till the Morning Comes" (Garcia, Hunter)
9. "Attics of My Life" (Garcia, Hunter)
10. "Truckin'" (Garcia, Lesh, Weir, Hunter)

== Personnel ==
=== Grateful Dead ===
- Jerry Garcia – guitar, vocals
- Bob Weir – guitar, vocals
- Ron "Pigpen" McKernan – organ, harmonica, vocals
- Phil Lesh – bass, vocals
- Bill Kreutzmann – drums, percussion
- Mickey Hart – drums, percussion except The Grateful Dead
- Tom Constanten – prepared piano, piano, electronic tape on Anthem of the Sun and keyboards on Aoxomoxoa

=== Additional musicians ===
- David Nelson – acoustic guitar on "Cumberland Blues", electric guitar on "Box of Rain"
- Dave Torbert – bass on "Box of Rain"
- David Grisman – mandolin on "Friend of the Devil" and "Ripple"
- Howard Wales – organ on "Candyman" and "Truckin'", piano on "Brokedown Palace"
- Ned Lagin – piano on "Candyman"

=== Production ===
- Blair Jackson – liner notes
- David Glasser, Chris Bellman – mastering
- Jamie Howarth, Plangent Processes – restoration
