= The Golden Road (1965–1973) =

Box set by Grateful Dead
- Released: October 16, 2001
- Recorded: November 3, 1965 – 1972
- Genres: Jam band, folk rock, rock
- Label: Rhino Records

Grateful Dead chronology
| Dick's Picks Volume 23 (2001) | The Golden Road (1965–1973) (2001) | Dick's Picks Volume 24 (2002) |

Professional ratings
Review scores
| Source | Rating |
|---|---|
| AllMusic | 4.5/5 stars |
| Encyclopedia of Popular Music | 5/5 stars |

The Golden Road (1965–1973) is a twelve-CD box set of the Grateful Dead's studio and live albums released during their time with Warner Bros. Records, from 1965 to 1973. After 1973, the band went on to create its own label, Grateful Dead Records. Also included in the box set is a two-disc bonus album, Birth of the Dead, containing very early recordings of the band.

The Golden Road contains expanded and remastered versions of all of the albums released during the band's time on contract with Warner Bros. Also included are numerous studio outtakes and live tracks. In 2003 these bonus tracks were appended to the individual releases of the respective albums, and Birth of the Dead was also given independent release.

The albums included in the box set are Birth of the Dead, The Grateful Dead, Anthem of the Sun, Aoxomoxoa, Live/Dead, Workingman's Dead, American Beauty, Grateful Dead (also known as Skull and Roses), Europe '72, and History of the Grateful Dead, Volume One (Bear's Choice). Anthem of the Sun appears in its original 1968 mix, but the Aoxomoxoa in this set is the 1971 remix, not the original 1969 mix.

== Track listing ==
=== Disc one: Birth of the Dead, disc 1 ===
- Birth of the Dead: The Studio Sides
1. "Early Morning Rain" (Lightfoot) – 3:22
2. "I Know You Rider" (traditional) – 2:41
3. "Mindbender (Confusion's Prince)" (Garcia, Lesh) – 2:41
4. "The Only Time Is Now" (Grateful Dead) – 2:24
5. "Caution (Do Not Stop on Tracks)" (Grateful Dead) – 3:17
6. "Can't Come Down" (Grateful Dead) – 3:04
7. "Stealin' (instrumental)" (Cannon) – 2:40
8. "Stealin' (w/ vocals)" (Cannon) – 2:36
9. "Don't Ease Me In (instrumental)" (traditional) – 2:01
10. "Don't Ease Me In (w/ vocals)" (traditional) – 2:02
11. "You Don't Have to Ask" (Grateful Dead) – 3:35
12. "Tastebud (instrumental)" (McKernan) – 7:04
13. "Tastebud (w/ vocals" (McKernan) – 4:35
14. "I Know You Rider" (traditional) – 2:36
15. "Cold Rain and Snow" (instrumental) (traditional) – 3:15
16. "Cold Rain and Snow" (w/ vocals) (traditional) – 3:17
17. "Fire in the City" (Krug) – 3:19

=== Disc two: Birth of the Dead, disc 2 ===
- Birth of the Dead: The Live Sides
1. "Viola Lee Blues" (Lewis) – 9:39
2. "Don't Ease Me In" (traditional) – 2:43
3. "Pain in My Heart" (Neville) – 4:24
4. "Sitting on Top of the World" (Chatmon, Vinson) – 3:51
5. "It's All over Now, Baby Blue" (Dylan) – 5:12
6. "I'm a King Bee" (Moore) – 8:52
7. "Big Boss Man" (Dixon, Smith) – 5:11
8. "Standing on the Corner" (Grateful Dead) – 3:46
9. "In the Pines" (Bryant, McMichen) – 4:55
10. "Nobody's Fault But Mine" (Johnson) – 4:15
11. "Next Time You See Me" (Forest, Harvey) – 2:47
12. "One Kind Favor" (Hopkins, Taub) – 3:44
13. "He Was a Friend of Mine" (traditional) – 4:45
14. "Keep Rolling By" (traditional) – 7:57

=== Disc three: The Grateful Dead ===
- The Grateful Dead
1. "The Golden Road (To Unlimited Devotion)" (Grateful Dead) – 2:07
2. "Beat It on Down the Line" (Fuller) – 2:27
3. "Good Morning Little School Girl" (Williamson) – 6:32
4. "Cold Rain and Snow" (Grateful Dead) – 2:26
5. "Sitting on Top of the World" (Jacobs, Carter) – 2:43
6. "Cream Puff War" (Garcia) – 3:18
7. "(Walk Me Out in the) Morning Dew" (Dobson, Rose) – 5:16
8. "New, New Minglewood Blues" (traditional) – 2:40
9. "Viola Lee Blues" (Lewis) – 10:09
10. "Alice D. Millionaire" (Grateful Dead) – 2:22
11. "Overseas Stomp (The Lindy)" (Jones, Shade) – 2:24
12. "Tastebud" (McKernan) – 4:18
13. "Death Don't Have No Mercy" (Davis) – 5:20
14. "Viola Lee Blues" (edited version) (Lewis) – 3:00
15. "Viola Lee Blues" (live at DANCE HALL, Rio Nido, CA 9/3/67) (Lewis) – 23:13

=== Disc four: Anthem of the Sun ===
- Anthem of the Sun
1. "That's It For The Other One" – 7:40:
  1. "Cryptical Envelopment" (Garcia)
  2. "Quodlibet For Tenderfeet" (Garcia, Kreutzmann, Lesh, McKernan, Weir)
  3. "The Faster We Go, The Rounder We Get" (Kreutzmann, Weir)
  4. "We Leave The Castle" (Constanten)
2. "New Potato Caboose" (Lesh, Petersen) – 8:26
3. "Born Cross-Eyed" (Weir) – 2:04
4. "Alligator" (Lesh, McKernan, Hunter) – 11:20
5. "Caution (Do Not Stop On Tracks)" (Garcia, Kreutzmann, Lesh, McKernan, Weir) – 9:37
6. "Alligator" (live at SHRINE AUDITORIUM, Los Angeles, CA 8/23/68) (Lesh, McKernan, Hunter) – 18:43
7. "Caution (Do Not Stop On Tracks)" (live at SHRINE AUDITORIUM, Los Angeles, CA 8/23/68) (Garcia, Kreutzmann, Lesh, McKernan, Weir) – 11:38
8. "Feedback" (live at SHRINE AUDITORIUM, Los Angeles, CA 8/23/68) (Grateful Dead) – 4:01
9. "Born Cross-Eyed" (single version) (Weir) – 2:55

=== Disc five: Aoxomoxoa ===
- Aoxomoxoa
1. "St. Stephen" (Garcia, Hunter, Lesh) – 4:26
2. "Dupree's Diamond Blues" (Garcia, Hunter) – 3:32
3. "Rosemary" (Garcia, Hunter) – 1:58
4. "Doin' That Rag" (Garcia, Hunter) – 4:41
5. "Mountains Of The Moon" (Garcia, Hunter) – 4:02
6. "China Cat Sunflower" (Garcia, Hunter) – 3:40
7. "What's Become Of The Baby" (Garcia, Hunter) – 8:12
8. "Cosmic Charlie" (Garcia, Hunter) – 5:29
9. "Clementine Jam" (studio jam 8/13/68) (Grateful Dead) – 10:46
10. "Nobody's Spoonful Jam" (studio jam 8/13/68) (Grateful Dead) – 10:04
11. "The Eleven Jam" (studio jam 8/13/68) (Grateful Dead) – 15:00
12. "Cosmic Charlie" (live at AVALON BALLROOM, San Francisco, CA 1/25/69) – 6:47

=== Disc six: Live/Dead ===
- Live/Dead
1. "Dark Star" (live at FILLMORE WEST, San Francisco, CA 2/27/69) (Grateful Dead, Hunter) – 23:18
2. "St. Stephen" (live at FILLMORE WEST, San Francisco, CA 2/27/69) (Hunter, Garcia, Lesh) – 6:31
3. "The Eleven" (live at AVALON BALLROOM, San Francisco, CA 1/26/69) (Hunter, Lesh) – 9:18
4. "Turn On Your Lovelight" (live at AVALON BALLROOM, San Francisco, CA 1/26/69) (Scott, Malone) – 15:05
5. "Death Don't Have No Mercy" (live at FILLMORE WEST, San Francisco, CA 3/2/69) (Davis) – 10:28
6. "Feedback" (live at FILLMORE WEST, San Francisco, CA 3/2/69) (McGannahan Skjellyfetti) – 7:49
7. "And We Bid You Goodnight" (live at FILLMORE WEST, San Francisco, CA 3/2/69) (traditional-) – 0:37
8. "Dark Star" (single version)" – 2:44
9. "Hidden Track" (radio promo) – 1:00

=== Disc seven: Workingman's Dead ===
- Workingman's Dead
1. "Uncle John's Band" (Garcia, Hunter) – 4:45
2. "High Time" (Garcia, Hunter) – 5:14
3. "Dire Wolf" (Garcia, Hunter) – 3:14
4. "New Speedway Boogie" (Garcia, Hunter) – 4:06
5. "Cumberland Blues" (Garcia, Hunter, Lesh) – 3:16
6. "Black Peter" (Garcia, Hunter) – 5:43
7. "Easy Wind" (Hunter) – 4:58
8. "Casey Jones" (Garcia, Hunter) – 4:38
9. "New Speedway Boogie" (alternate mix) – 4:10
10. "Dire Wolf" (live at VETERANS MEMORIAL HALL, Santa Rosa, CA 6/27/69) – 2:31
11. "Black Peter" (live at GOLDEN HALL COMMUNITY CONCOURSE, San Diego, CA 1/10/70) – 9:07
12. "Easy Wind" (live at SPRINGER'S INN, Portland, OR 1/16/70) – 8:09
13. "Cumberland Blues" (live at OREGON STATE UNIVERSITY, Corvalis, OR 1/17/70) – 4:52
14. "Mason's Children" (live at CIVIC AUDITORIUM, Honolulu, HI 1/24/70) (Garcia, Hunter, Lesh, Weir) – 6:32
15. "Uncle John's Band" (live at WINTERLAND ARENA, San Francisco, CA 10/4/70) – 7:57

=== Disc eight: American Beauty ===
- American Beauty
1. "Box of Rain" (Hunter, Lesh) – 5:18
2. "Friend of the Devil" (Garcia, Dawson, Hunter) – 3:24
3. "Sugar Magnolia" (Weir, Hunter) – 3:19
4. "Operator" (Ron McKernan) – 2:25
5. "Candyman" (Garcia, Hunter) – 6:12
6. "Ripple" (Garcia, Hunter) – 4:09
7. "Brokedown Palace" (Garcia, Hunter) – 4:09
8. "Till the Morning Comes" (Garcia, Hunter) – 3:09
9. "Attics of My Life" (Garcia, Hunter) – 5:14
10. "Truckin'" (Garcia, Lesh, Weir, Hunter) – 5:17
11. "Truckin'" (single edit) – 3:17
12. "Friend of the Devil" (live at FILLMORE EAST, New York City, NY 5/15/70) – 4:21
13. "Candyman" (live at WINTERLAND ARENA, San Francisco, CA 4/15/70) – 5:18
14. "Till the Morning Comes" (live at WINTERLAND ARENA, San Francisco, CA 10/4/70) – 3:20
15. "Attics of My Life" (live at FILLMORE WEST, San Francisco, CA 6/6/70) – 6:31
16. "Truckin'" (live at LEGION STADIUM, El Monte, CA 12/26/70) – 10:10
17. "Ripple" (single mix) – 4:09 (hidden bonus track)
18. "American Beauty Radio Spot – 1:00 (hidden bonus track)

=== Disc nine: Skull and Roses ===
- Grateful Dead (Skull and Roses)
1. "Bertha" (live at FILLMORE EAST, New York City, NY 4/27/71) (Garcia, Hunter) – 5:43
2. "Mama Tried" (live at FILLMORE EAST, New York City, NY 4/26/71) (Haggard) – 2:43
3. "Big Railroad Blues" (live at MANHATTAN CENTER, New York City, NY 4/5/71) (Lewis) – 3:35
4. "Playing in the Band" (live at MANHATTAN CENTER, New York City, NY 4/6/71) (Hart, Hunter, Weir) – 4:40
5. "The Other One" (live at FILLMORE EAST, New York City, NY 4/28/71) (Kreutzmann, Weir) – 18:07
6. "Me and My Uncle" (live at FILLMORE EAST, New York City, NY 4/29/71) (John Phillips) – 3:04
7. "Big Boss Man" (live at FILLMORE EAST, New York City, NY 4/26/71) (Dixon, Smith) – 5:14
8. "Me and Bobby McGee" (live at FILLMORE EAST, New York City, NY 4/27/71) (Foster, Kristofferson) – 5:42
9. "Johnny B. Goode" (live at WINTERLAND ARENA, San Francisco, CA 3/24/71) (Berry) – 3:44
10. "Wharf Rat" (live at FILLMORE EAST, New York City, NY 4/26/71) (Garcia, Hunter) – 8:32
11. "Not Fade Away / Goin' Down the Road Feeling Bad" (live at MANHATTAN CENTER, New York City, NY 4/5/71) (Holly, Petty) – 9:26
12. "Oh, Boy!" (live at MANHATTAN CENTER, New York City, NY 4/6/71) (Petty, Tilghman, West) – 2:50
13. "I'm a Hog for You" (live at MANHATTAN CENTER, New York City, NY 4/6/71) (Leiber, Stoller) – 5:20
14. "Hidden track" (radio spot) – 1:00

=== Disc ten: Europe '72, disc 1 ===
- Europe '72
1. "Cumberland Blues" (live at WEMBLEY EMPIRE POOL, London, England 4/8/72) (Garcia, Hunter, Lesh) – 5:43
2. "He's Gone" (live at the CONCERTGEBOUW, Amsterdam, the Netherlands 5/10/72) (Garcia, Hunter) – 6:57
3. "One More Saturday Night" (live at the STRAND LYCEUM, London, England 5/24/72) (Weir) – 4:49
4. "Jack Straw" (live at L'OLYMPIA, Paris, France 5/3/72) (Hunter, Weir) – 4:49
5. "You Win Again" (live at the STRAND LYCEUM, London, England 5/24/72) (Williams) – 4:00
6. "China Cat Sunflower" (live at L'OLYMPIA, Paris, France 5/3/72) (Garcia, Hunter) – 5:32
7. "I Know You Rider" (live at L'OLYMPIA, Paris, France 5/3/72) (traditional) – 5:03
8. "Brown-Eyed Woman" (live at TIVOLI CONCERT HALL, Copenhagen, Denmark 4/14/72) (Garcia, Hunter) – 4:38
9. "It Hurts Me Too" (live at the STRAND LYCEUM, London, England 5/24/72) (James, Sehorn) – 7:20
10. "Ramble on Rose" (live at the STRAND LYCEUM, London, England 5/26/72) (Garcia, Hunter) – 6:04
11. "Sugar Magnolia" (live at L'OLYMPIA, Paris, France 5/4/72) (Hunter, Weir) – 7:10
12. "Mr. Charlie" (live at the STRAND LYCEUM, London, England 5/26/72) (Hunter, McKernan) – 3:39
13. "Tennessee Jed" (live at L'OLYMPIA, Paris, France 5/3/72) (Garcia, Hunter) – 7:18
14. "The Stranger (Two Souls in Communion)" (live at JAHRHUNDERT HALLE, Frankfurt, West Germany 4/26/72) (McKernan) – 6:50

=== Disc eleven: Europe '72, disc 2 ===
- Europe '72
1. "Truckin'" (live at the STRAND LYCEUM, London, England 5/26/72) (Garcia, Hunter, Lesh, Weir) – 13:06
2. "Epilogue" (live at the STRAND LYCEUM, London, England 5/26/72) (Grateful Dead) – 5:10
3. "Prelude" (live at the STRAND LYCEUM, London, England 5/26/72) (Grateful Dead) – 7:37
4. "Morning Dew" (live at the STRAND LYCEUM, London, England 5/26/72) (Dobson, Rose) – 11:41
5. "Looks Like Rain" (live at WEMBLEY EMPIRE POOL, London, England 4/8/72) (Barlow, Weir) – 7:42
6. "Good Lovin'" > (live at TIVOLI CONCERT HALL, Copenhagen, Denmark 4/14/72) (Clark, Resnick) – 18:30
7. "Caution (Do Not Stop on Tracks)" > (live at TIVOLI CONCERT HALL, Copenhagen, Denmark, 4/14/72)(Garcia, Kreutzmann, Lesh) – 4:39
8. "Who Do You Love?" > (live at TIVOLI CONCERT HALL, Copenhagen, Denmark 4/14/72) (Ellas McDaniel) – 0:22
9. "Caution (Do Not Stop on Tracks)" > (live at TIVOLI CONCERT HALL, Copenhagen, Denmark 4/14/72) (Garcia, Kreutzmann, Lesh) – 1:43
10. "Good Lovin'" (live at TIVOLI CONCERT HALL, Copenhagen, Denmark 4/14/72) (Clark, Resnick) – 5:59
11. "The Yellow Dog Story" (Hidden Track) (live at WEMBLEY EMPIRE POOL, London, England 4/8/72) (Grateful Dead) – 3:09

=== Disc twelve: Bear's Choice ===
- History of the Grateful Dead, Volume One (Bear's Choice)
1. "Katie Mae" (live at FILLMORE EAST, New York City, NY 2/13/70) (Hopkins) – 4:44
2. "Dark Hollow" (live at FILLMORE EAST, New York City, NY 2/14/70) (Browning) – 3:52
3. "I've Been All Around This World" (live at FILLMORE EAST, New York City, NY 2/14/70) (traditional) – 4:18
4. "Wake Up Little Susie" (live at FILLMORE EAST, New York City, NY 2/13/70) (Bryant, Bryant) – 2:31
5. "Black Peter" (live at FILLMORE EAST, New York City, NY 2/13/70) (Garcia, Hunter) – 7:27
6. "Smokestack Lightning" (live at FILLMORE EAST, New York City, NY 2/13/70) (Howlin' Wolf) – 17:59
7. "Hard to Handle" (live at FILLMORE EAST, New York City, NY 2/14/70) (Isbell, Jones, Redding) – 6:29
8. "Good Lovin'" (live at FILLMORE EAST, New York City, NY 2/13/70) (Clark, Resnick) – 8:56
9. "Big Boss Man" (live at FILLMORE WEST, San Francisco, CA 2/5/70) (Dixon, Smith) – 4:53
10. "Smokestack Lightning" (Version Two) (live at FILLMORE WEST, San Francisco, CA 2/8/70) (Howlin' Wolf) – 15:11
11. "Sitting on Top of the World" (live at FILLMORE WEST, San Francisco, CA 2/8/70) (Chatmon, Vinson) – 3:20

== Personnel ==
Grateful Dead:

- Jerry Garcia – lead guitar, acoustic guitar, pedal steel guitar, piano, kazoo, vibraslap, vocals
- Bob Weir – rhythm guitar, acoustic guitar, 12-string guitar, kazoo, vocals
- Ron "Pigpen" McKernan – keyboards, organ, celesta, acoustic guitar, harmonica, congas, claves, percussion, vocals
- Bill Kreutzmann – drums, percussion
- Phil Lesh – bass, guitar, piano, harpsichord, trumpet, kazoo, timpani, vocals
- Mickey Hart – drums, percussion
- Tom Constanten – keyboards, prepared piano, piano, electronic tape
- Keith Godchaux – piano
- Donna Jean Godchaux – vocals
- Robert Hunter – songwriter

Additional performers:

- for a comprehensive listing, see individual album pages

Production:

- James Austin, David Lemieux – producers
- Dennis McNally, Lou Tambakos – Birth Of The Dead concept & compilation
- Peter McQuaid – executive producer
- Michael Wesley Johnson – associate producer, research coordination
- Eileen Law – archival researcher, archivist
- Cassidy Law – coordinator
- Dennis McNally – consultant
- Jeffrey Norman – mixing
- Joe Gastwirt/Oceanview Digital, Jo Motta – mastering and production consultants
- Jimmy Edwards – product manager
- Gary Peterson – discographical annotation
- Shawn Amos – liner notes coordination
- Vanessa Atkins – editorial supervision
- Daniel Goldmark – editorial research
- Hugh Brown – reissue art director
- Malia Doss – business affairs at Rhino Records
- Mickey Hart – project assistant
- Bob Weir – project assistant
- Bill Kreutzmann – project assistant
- Bill Inglot – project assistant
- Steve Lang – project assistant
- Patrick Kraus – project assistant
- Jan Simmons – project assistant
- Blair Jackson – project assistant
- Steve Silberman – project assistant
- Hale Milgrim – project assistant
- David Gans – project assistant
- Owsley Stanley – project assistant
- Jeff Gold – project assistant
- Connie Mosley – project assistant
- Gary Lambert – project assistant
- Bill Belmont – project assistant
- Neil Ruttenberg – project assistant

== Charts ==
Billboard

| Year | Chart | Position |
|---|---|---|
| 2001 | Billboard 200 | 191 |

RIAA Certification

| Certification | Date |
|---|---|
| Gold | November 14, 2001 |
