= Day of the Dead (2016 album) =

2016 compilation album from the Red Hot AIDS Benefit Series

Compilation album for charity by Red Hot AIDS Benefit Series
- Released: May 20, 2016
- Recorded: 2011–2015
- Length: 325:53
- Label: 4AD (RAD 3624)
- Producers: Aaron and Bryce Dessner of The National, Josh Kaufman

Red Hot AIDS Benefit Series chronology
Red Hot + Bach (2014)	Day of the Dead (2016)

Singles from Day of the Dead
- 1. "Touch of Grey" Released: March 24, 2016; 2. "Sugaree" Released: March 24, 2016; 3. "Black Muddy River" Released: March 24, 2016; 4. "New Speedway Boogie" Released: March 24, 2016; 5. "Morning Dew" Released: March 24, 2016; 6. "Terrapin Station (Suite)" Released: April 11, 2016; 7. "Candyman" Released: April 27, 2016; 8. "Rubin and Cherise" Released: April 27, 2016; 9. "To Lay Me Down" Released: April 27, 2016; 10. "Cumberland Blues" Released: April 27, 2016; 11. "Shakedown Street" Released: April 27, 2016

Day of the Dead is the twenty-fifth compilation release benefiting the Red Hot Organization, an international charity dedicated to raising funds and awareness for HIV and AIDS. Featuring fifty-nine exclusive recordings of covers of Grateful Dead songs by a number of independent artists as a tribute to the band, the compilation was released on May 20, 2016, as five CDs, a limited edition vinyl LP box set, and as a digital download. John Carlin, the founder of the Red Hot Organization, was the executive producer for the album. The members of The National first performed with Bob Weir at his Bay Area studio in 2012 as part of the Headcount benefit The Bridge Session. The group's budding friendship with the Dead cofounder pushed them to record the massive Dead tribute.

It is the second compilation album produced by Aaron and Bryce Dessner of The National for Red Hot Organization, following 2009's Dark Was the Night, which has raised over $1.5 million for the organizations fighting AIDS to date.

A Day of the Dead live performance took place at the second annual Eaux Claires Festival on August 12–13, 2016. The performers, who all appear on the record, included Jenny Lewis, Matthew Houck (Phosphorescent), Lucius, Will Oldham, Moses Sumney, Sam Amidon, Richard Reed Parry, Matt Berninger, Justin Vernon, Josh Kaufman, Bruce Hornsby, Ruban Nielson, Aaron and Bryce Dessner and The National.

== Track listing ==
=== Digital sequence ===
"Thunder" (Vol.1)
No.	Title	Writer(s)	Performed by	Length
1.	"Touch of Grey"	Jerry Garcia; Robert Hunter	The War on Drugs	5:16
2.	"Sugaree"	Garcia; Hunter	Phosphorescent, Jenny Lewis & Friends	4:59
3.	"Candyman"	Garcia; Hunter	Jim James & Friends	5:34
4.	"Cassidy"	Bob Weir; John Perry Barlow	Moses Sumney, Jenny Lewis & Friends	3:13
5.	"Black Muddy River"	Garcia; Hunter	Bruce Hornsby and DeYarmond Edison	7:38
6.	"Loser"	Garcia; Hunter	Ed Droste, Binki Shapiro & Friends	5:15
7.	"Peggy-O"	traditional	The National	5:35
8.	"Box of Rain"	Phil Lesh; Hunter	Kurt Vile and the Violators (featuring J Mascis)	5:30
9.	"Rubin and Cherise"	Garcia; Hunter	Bonnie 'Prince' Billy & Friends	5:46
10.	"To Lay Me Down"	Garcia; Hunter	Perfume Genius, Sharon Van Etten & Friends	6:20
11.	"New Speedway Boogie"	Garcia; Hunter	Courtney Barnett	5:20
12.	"Friend of the Devil"	Garcia; John Dawson; Hunter	Mumford & Sons	4:31
13.	"Uncle John's Band"	Garcia; Hunter	Lucius	4:27
14.	"Me and My Uncle"	John Phillips	The Lone Bellow & Friends	3:04
15.	"Mountains of the Moon"	Garcia; Hunter	Lee Ranaldo, Lisa Hannigan & Friends	3:53
16.	"Black Peter"	Garcia; Hunter	Anohni and yMusic	2:25
17.	"Garcia Counterpoint"		Bryce Dessner	7:12
18.	"Terrapin Station (Suite)"	Garcia; Mickey Hart; Bill Kreutzmann; Hunter	Daniel Rossen, Christopher Bear and The National (featuring Josh Kaufman, Conrad Doucette, So Percussion and Brooklyn Youth Chorus)	16:50
19.	"Attics of My Life"	Garcia; Hunter	Angel Olsen	4:15
20.	"St. Stephen (live)"	Garcia; Lesh; Hunter	Wilco with Bob Weir	6:39
Total length:				113:42

"Lightning" (Vol. 2)
No.	Title	Writer(s)	Performed by	Length
1.	"If I Had the World to Give"	Garcia; Hunter	Bonnie 'Prince' Billy	2:36
2.	"Standing on the Moon"	Garcia; Hunter	Phosphorescent & Friends	5:33
3.	"Cumberland Blues"	Garcia; Lesh; Hunter	Charles Bradley and Menahan Street Band	3:16
4.	"Ship of Fools"	Garcia; Hunter	The Tallest Man on Earth & Friends	5:12
5.	"Bird Song"	Garcia; Hunter	Bonnie 'Prince' Billy & Friends	6:09
6.	"Morning Dew"	Bonnie Dobson; Tim Rose	The National	5:34
7.	"Truckin'"	Garcia; Lesh; Weir; Hunter	Marijuana Deathsquads	4:55
8.	"Dark Star"	Garcia; Hart; Kreutzmann; Lesh; Ron McKernan; Weir; Hunter	Cass McCombs, Joe Russo & Friends	3:57
9.	"Nightfall of Diamonds"		Nightfall of Diamonds	8:27
10.	"Transitive Refraction Axis for John Oswald"		Tim Hecker	3:59
11.	"Going Down The Road Feelin' Bad"	traditional	Lucinda Williams & Friends	4:04
12.	"Playing in the Band"	Weir; Hunter	Tunde Adebimpe, Lee Ranaldo & Friends	9:46
13.	"Stella Blue"	Garcia; Hunter	Local Natives	4:39
14.	"Eyes of the World"	Garcia; Hunter	Tal National	5:09
15.	"Help on the Way"	Garcia; Hunter	Béla Fleck with Oliver Wood, Zakir Hussain, Edgar Meyer, Abigail Washburn	7:38
16.	"Franklin's Tower"	Garcia; Kreutzmann; Hunter	Orchestra Baobab	6:29
17.	"Till the Morning Comes"	Garcia; Hunter	Luluc with Xylouris White	5:02
18.	"Ripple"	Garcia; Hunter	The Walkmen	4:25
19.	"Brokedown Palace"	Garcia; Hunter	Richard Reed Parry with Caroline Shaw and Little Scream (featuring Garth Hudson)	4:51
Total length:				101:41

"Sunshine" (Vol. 3)
No.	Title	Writer(s)	Performed by	Length
1.	"Here Comes Sunshine"	Garcia; Hunter	Real Estate	6:00
2.	"Shakedown Street"	Garcia; Hunter	Unknown Mortal Orchestra	3:28
3.	"Brown-Eyed Women"	Garcia; Hunter	Hiss Golden Messenger	4:48
4.	"Jack-A-Roe"	traditional	This Is the Kit	4:30
5.	"High Time"	Garcia; Hunter	Daniel Rossen and Christopher Bear	4:16
6.	"Dire Wolf"	Garcia; Hunter	The Lone Bellow & Friends	3:03
7.	"Althea"	Garcia; Hunter	Winston Marshall, Kodiak Blue and Shura	5:02
8.	"Clementine Jam"	Garcia; Hart; Kreutzmann; Lesh; McKernan; Weir	Orchestra Baobab	5:00
9.	"China Cat Sunflower -> I Know You Rider"	Garcia; Hunter; -> traditional	Stephen Malkmus and the Jicks	11:24
10.	"Easy Wind"	Hunter	Bill Callahan	5:38
11.	"Wharf Rat"	Garcia; Hunter	Ira Kaplan & Friends	10:08
12.	"Estimated Prophet"	Weir; Barlow	The Rileys	5:17
13.	"Drums -> Space"		Man Forever, So Percussion and Oneida	4:51
14.	"Cream Puff War"	Garcia	Fucked Up	6:17
15.	"Dark Star"	Garcia; Hart; Kreutzmann; Lesh; McKernan; Weir; Hunter	The Flaming Lips	6:13
16.	"What's Become of the Baby"	Garcia; Hunter	s t a r g a z e	6:35
17.	"King Solomon's Marbles"	Lesh	Vijay Iyer	4:34
18.	"Rosemary"	Garcia; Hunter	Mina Tindle & Friends	2:05
19.	"And We Bid You Goodnight"	traditional	Sam Amidon	2:43
20.	"I Know You Rider (live)"	traditional	The National with Bob Weir	8:38
Total length:				110:30

CD sequence

=== CD sequence ===
Disc 1

1. Touch of Grey
2. Sugaree
3. Candyman
4. Dire Wolf
5. New Speedway Boogie
6. Friend of the Devil
7. Black Muddy River
8. Morning Dew
9. Black Peter
10. Loser
11. To Lay Me Down

Disc 2

1. Box of Rain
2. Rubin and Cherise
3. Me and My Uncle
4. Cassidy
5. Uncle John's Band
6. Mountains of the Moon
7. Dark Star - (Cass McCombs, Joe Russo & Friends)
8. Nightfall of Diamonds
9. Transitive Refraction Axis for John Oswald
10. Playing in the Band
11. Brokedown Palace

Disc 3

1. Peggy-O
2. Garcia Counterpoint
3. Terrapin Station (Suite)
4. Clementine Jam
5. China Cat Sunflower -> I Know You Rider
6. Jack-A-Roe
7. Easy Wind
8. Wharf Rat
9. Going Down The Road Feelin' Bad
10. And We Bid You Goodnight

Disc 4

1. Ripple
2. Truckin'
3. Dark Star - (The Flaming Lips)
4. Stella Blue
5. Shakedown Street
6. Franklin's Tower
7. Eyes of the World
8. Help on the Way
9. Estimated Prophet
10. What's Become of the Baby
11. King Solomon's Marbles
12. If I Had the World to Give

Disc 5

1. Standing on the Moon
2. Ship of Fools
3. Bird Song
4. Brown-Eyed Women
5. Here Comes Sunshine
6. Cumberland Blues
7. Drums -> Space
8. Cream Puff War
9. Rosemary
10. High Time
11. Till the Morning Comes
12. Althea
13. Attics of My Life
14. St. Stephen (live)
15. I Know You Rider (live)

LP sequence

=== LP sequence ===
1. Touch of Grey
2. Shakedown Street
3. Loser
4. Jack-A-Roe
5. Peggy-O
6. Bird Song
7. Brown-Eyed Women
8. Sugaree
9. Help on the Way
10. Franklin's Tower
11. King Solomon's Marbles
12. Box of Rain
13. Friend of the Devil
14. Wharf Rat
15. Cassidy
16. Candyman
17. Clementine Jam
18. Playing in the Band
19. Eyes of the World
20. Terrapin Station (Suite)
21. Ship of Fools
22. Estimated Prophet
23. Morning Dew
24. Me and My Uncle
25. China Cat Sunflower -> I Know You Rider
26. If I Had the World to Give
27. Dark Star - (Cass McCombs, Joe Russo & Friends)
28. Nightfall of Diamonds
29. Dark Star - (The Flaming Lips)
30. Rubin and Cherise
31. Althea
32. Mountains of the Moon
33. Stella Blue
34. Standing on the Moon
35. To Lay Me Down
36. Uncle John's Band
37. High Time
38. Dire Wolf
39. New Speedway Boogie
40. Cumberland Blues
41. Black Peter
42. Easy Wind
43. Here Comes Sunshine
44. Rosemary
45. Drums -> Space
46. Transitive Refraction Axis for John Oswald
47. What's Become of the Baby
48. Garcia Counterpoint
49. Brokedown Palace
50. Till the Morning Comes
51. Attics of My Life
52. Cream Puff War
53. Truckin'
54. Going Down The Road Feelin' Bad
55. Black Muddy River
56. Ripple
57. And We Bid You Goodnight
58. St. Stephen (live)
59. I Know You Rider (live)

== Personnel ==
- Created and curated by Aaron Dessner, Bryce Dessner
- Produced by Aaron Dessner
- Co-producer: Bryce Dessner, Josh Kaufman
- Music direction: Josh Kaufman, Aaron Dessner
- Co-curators: Scott Devendorf, Bryan Devendorf, Conrad Doucette
- Project manager: Tom Wironen
- Co-executive producer: Dawn Barger
- Executive producer: John Carlin

== Charts ==
Chart (2016)	Peak position
Belgian Albums (Ultratop Flanders)	76
Belgian Albums (Ultratop Wallonia)	196
German Albums (Offizielle Top 100)	54
US Billboard 200	49
