= A Box of Rain =

Cover of the original edition

A Box of Rain is a 1990 book by Grateful Dead lyricist Robert Hunter, compiling his complete songbook, in and out of the Dead, from 1965 until 1990. A more-recent paperback edition has also been published, which includes lyrics up until 1993; the original edition was hardbound. The 1993 publication also includes a different introduction by the author.

The book's title comes from "Box of Rain", a song recorded and made famous on the Dead's 1970 studio classic, American Beauty.

== Sources ==
- Robert Hunter, A Box of Rain, Penguin (Non-Classics); (1993) ISBN 0-14-013451-4
