= Fare Thee Well: Celebrating 50 Years of the Grateful Dead =

Series of rock concerts in 2015

- Concert by Bob Weir, Phil Lesh, Bill Kreutzmann, Mickey Hart, Trey Anastasio, Bruce Hornsby, Jeff Chimenti
- Concert poster for the Chicago shows
- Location: Santa Clara, California; Chicago, Illinois
- Start date: June 27, 2015
- End date: July 5, 2015
- Legs: 2
- No. of shows: 5
- Box office: $52,232,413

Fare Thee Well: Celebrating 50 Years of the Grateful Dead was a series of concerts that were performed by most of the surviving members of the Grateful Dead – Bob Weir, Phil Lesh, Bill Kreutzmann and Mickey Hart – joined by Trey Anastasio, Bruce Hornsby and Jeff Chimenti, to celebrate the 50th anniversary of the Grateful Dead. The performances took place at Santa Clara's Levi Stadium on June 27 and 28, 2015 and Chicago's Soldier Field on July 3, 4 and 5, 2015. The concerts were the first time that the four had played together since the Dead's 2009 tour. In the leadup to the shows, they were publicized as the final time that Weir, Lesh, Kreutzmann, and Hart would perform together, which in fact proved to be the case.

== Tickets ==
The three shows in Chicago were initially announced on January 16, 2015, as the only three Fare Thee Well performances. Tickets were first made available through the Grateful Dead's GDSTOO mail order system. Deadheads mailed in more than 60,000 envelopes, requesting a total of more than 360,000 tickets. As a result, only about one in ten requests was fulfilled. On February 28, 2015, when tickets became available on Ticketmaster, over 500,000 people logged on to purchase tickets, which set a new Ticketmaster record for ticket demand for a concert. Following the initial sellout of these concerts, seats were made available behind the stage, and prices on secondary ticket sites such as StubHub averaged $2,000 each.

Due to the high demand for the Chicago concerts, concert promoter Peter Shapiro announced two more concerts in Santa Clara, California on June 27 and 28, 2015. To help prevent scalpers from obtaining tickets for resale to these concerts, tickets were only made available through an online lottery. Tickets to the Santa Clara shows were initially sold at very high prices on StubHub but ended up dropping as low as $19 by the week before the concerts. Prices for the Chicago concerts also fell in the weeks prior to the shows but were still averaging about $200.

The first show in Chicago drew an attendance of 70,764 fans, setting an attendance record at Soldier Field.

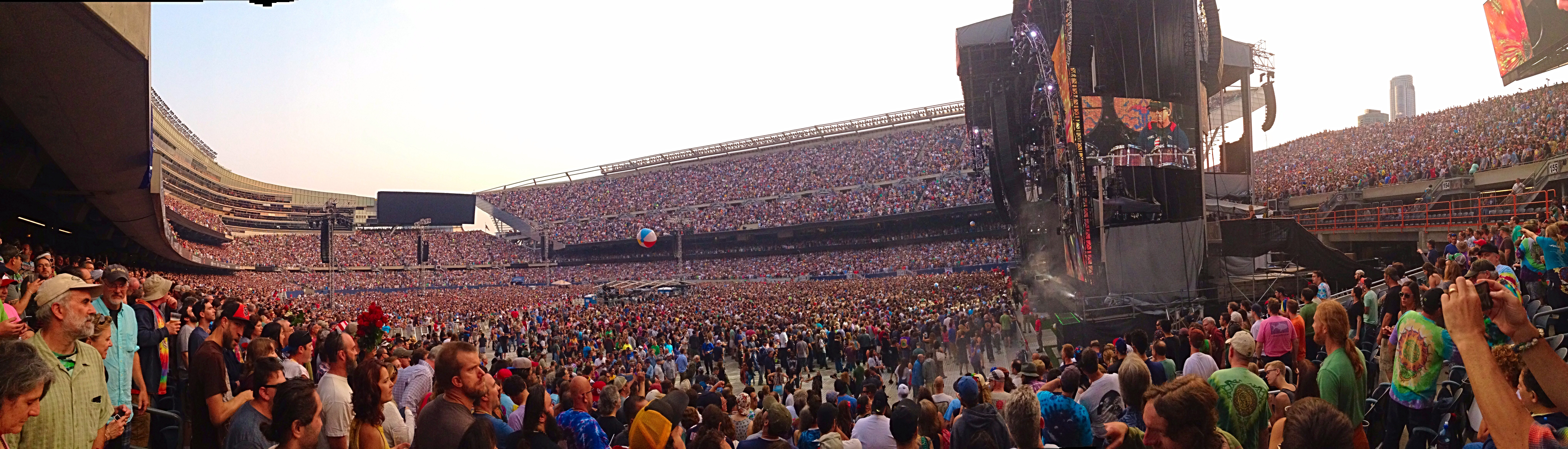
Panorama of the Fare Thee Well performance at Soldier Field, Chicago on July 03, 2015

== Shows ==
List of concerts, showing date, city, country, venue, tickets sold, number of available tickets and amount of gross revenue
Date	City	Country	Venue	Attendance	Revenue
June 27, 2015	Santa Clara, California	United States	Levi's Stadium	151,650 / 151,650	$21,549,139
June 28, 2015	Santa Clara, California	United States	Levi's Stadium	151,650 / 151,650	$21,549,139
July 3, 2015	Chicago, Illinois	United States	Soldier Field	210,283 / 210,283	$30,683,274
July 4, 2015	Chicago, Illinois	United States	Soldier Field	210,283 / 210,283	$30,683,274
July 5, 2015	Chicago, Illinois	United States	Soldier Field	210,283 / 210,283	$30,683,274
Total				361,933 / 361,933 (100%)	$52,232,413

== Personnel ==
- Mickey Hart – drums, percussion
- Bill Kreutzmann – drums, percussion
- Phil Lesh – bass guitar, vocals
- Bob Weir – guitar, vocals

with

- Trey Anastasio – guitar, vocals
- Jeff Chimenti – keyboards, vocals
- Bruce Hornsby – piano, vocals

== Simulcasts ==
Due to the high demand for tickets to these concerts they were simulcast on large screens at multiple movie theaters and concert venues in the United States as well as made available live, for a fee, on YouTube and various pay per view services. Satellite radio service Sirius played the concerts, with a slight delay, on their Grateful Dead channel. The concerts were also simulcasted at movie theaters in the United States. The pay-per-view set a new record for a music event with more than 400,000 subscriptions, surpassing a 1999 simulcast by the Backstreet Boys which drew 160,000 subscriptions.

== Message from President Obama ==
US President Barack Obama acknowledged the band in a special message that appeared in the official program for the event on July 3, 2015.

Here's to fifty years of the Grateful Dead, an iconic American band that embodies the creativity, passion, and ability to bring people together that makes American music so great. Enjoy this weekend's celebration of your fans and legacy. And as Jerry would say, "Let there be songs to fill the air."

Weir, Lesh, Kreutzmann and Hart (as The Dead) had previously reunited to perform a concert at Penn State University called Change Rocks on October 12, 2008, in support of Obama's campaign. They later played two sets at the Mid-Atlantic Inaugural ball on January 20, 2009.

== Use of the "Grateful Dead" name ==
Since the initial announcement of these three (and later five) concerts, there has been much debate among fans as to the name of the band playing these concerts. Most media outlets, including Rolling Stone, and Ticketmaster have referred to these concerts as being performed by the Grateful Dead. However, the event's website and band member Bob Weir have only referred to the event as "Fare Thee Well: Celebrating 50 Years of the Grateful Dead" (this is also the name printed on the tickets). This means that the band technically had no name, although it could be considered another version of The Dead, which is the name Weir, Lesh, Kreutzmann and Hart had sporadically performed with since the Grateful Dead's 1995 disbandment. It is also referred to as The Dead on the taper's archive site Relisten. The band has also been called simply "Fare Thee Well", e.g. on The Grateful Dead Channel and music trading site etree.

== Set lists ==
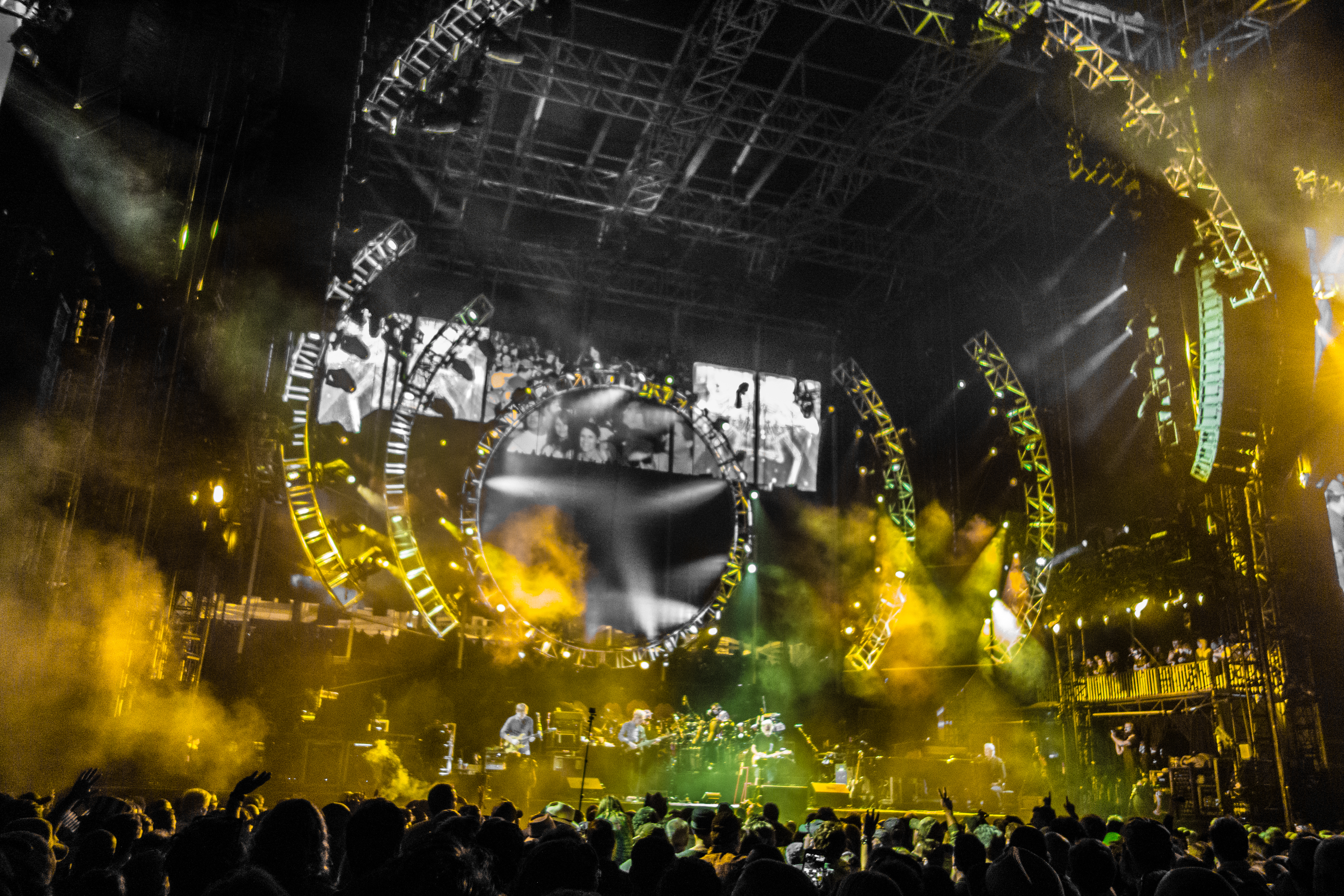
The band performing at the June 28, 2015 concert in Santa Clara, California

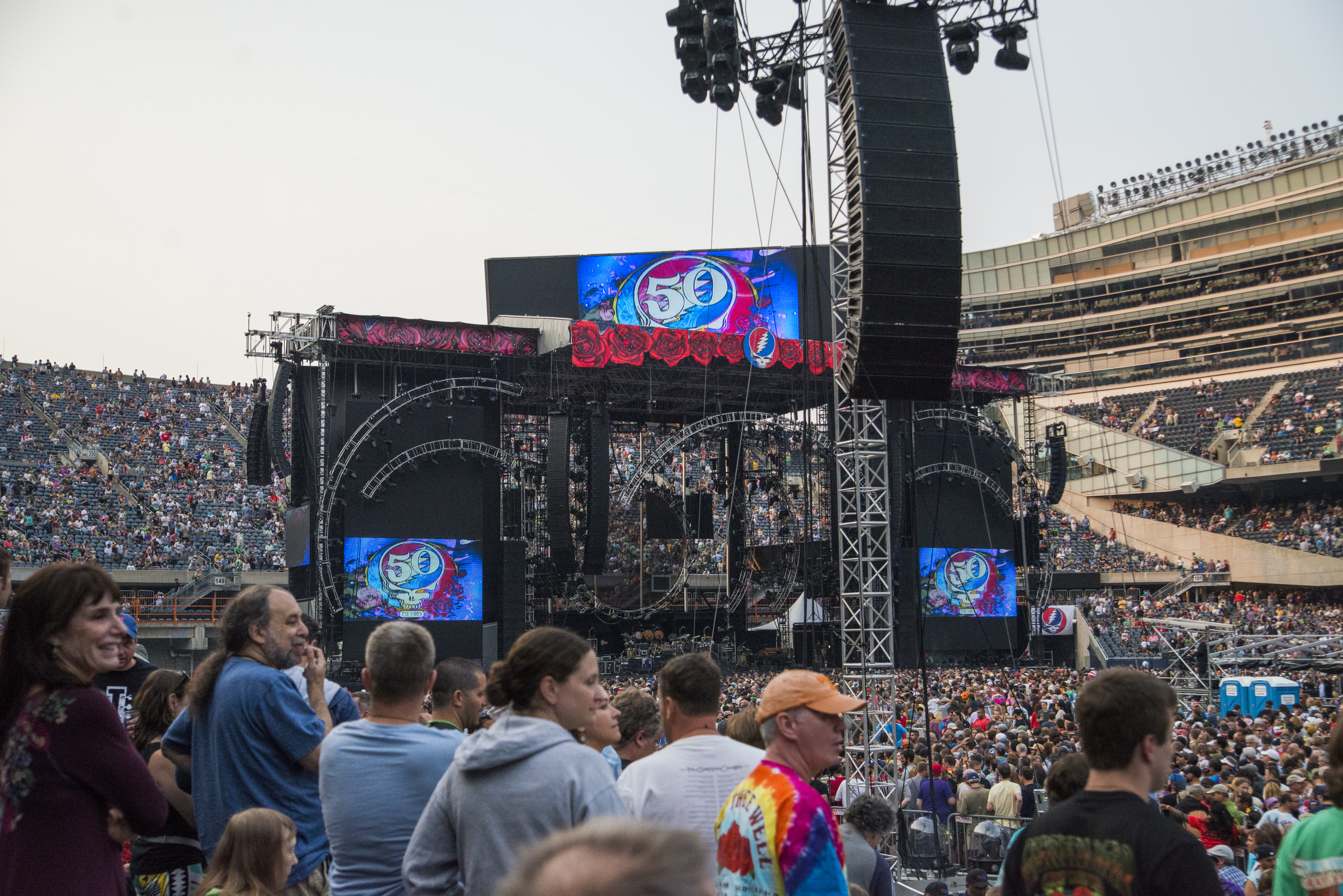
The band playing on July 3, 2015, at Soldier Field, Chicago, Illinois

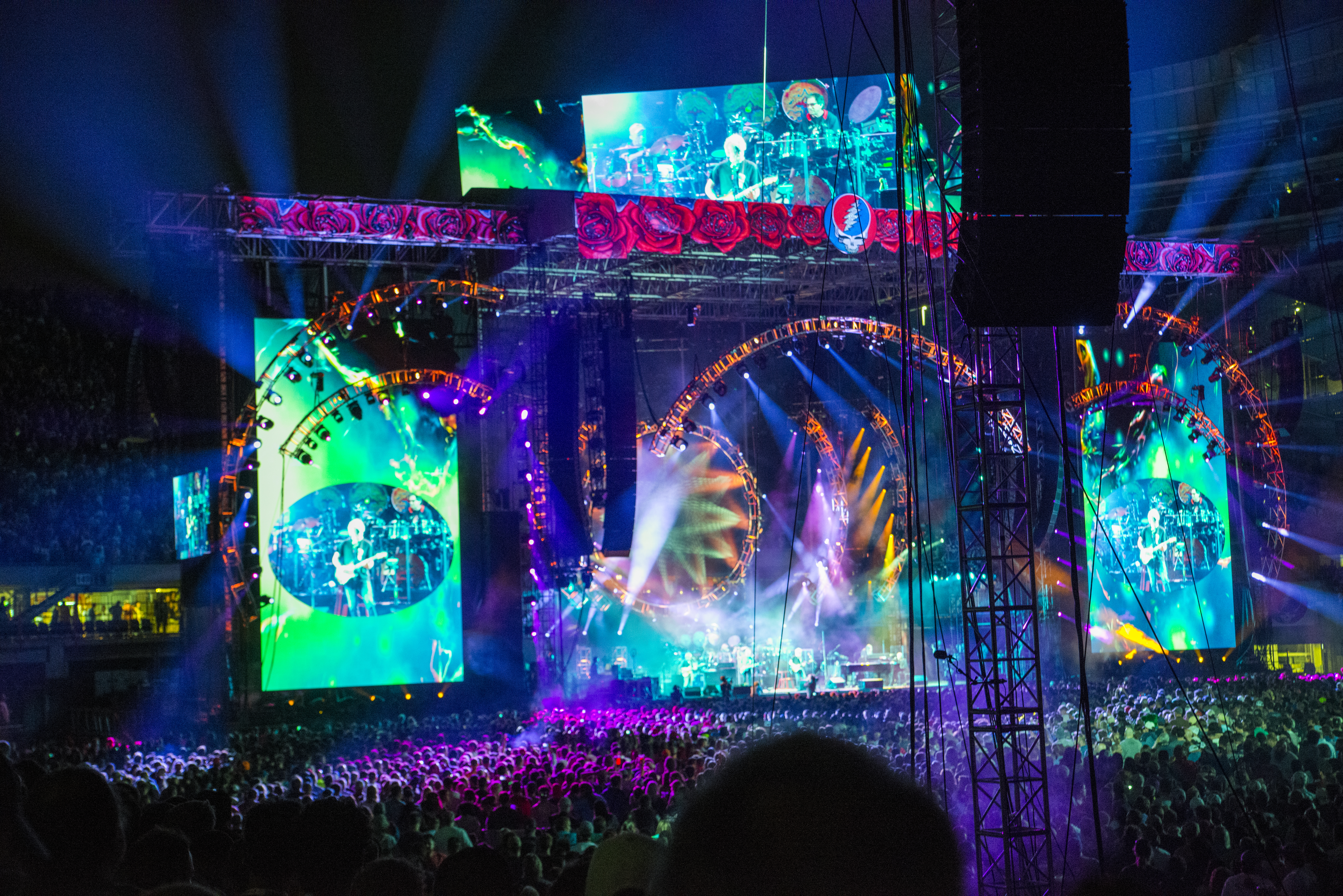
Another view of the July 3, 2015 concert in Chicago

Over the course of the five shows 81 different songs were performed, not including "Drums" and "Space," which were played all five nights. Only two other songs, "Truckin'" and "Cumberland Blues," were repeated.

June 27 – Santa Clara, California

- First set: "Truckin'", "Uncle John's Band", "Alligator" → "Cumberland Blues", "Born Cross-Eyed" → "Cream Puff War", "Viola Lee Blues"
- Second set: "Cryptical Envelopment" → "Dark Star" → "St. Stephen" → "The Eleven" → "Turn On Your Love Light" → "Drums" → "Space" → "What's Become of the Baby" → "The Other One" → "Morning Dew"
- Encore: "Casey Jones"

June 28 – Santa Clara, California

- First set: "Feel Like a Stranger", "New Minglewood Blues", "Brown-Eyed Women", "Loose Lucy", "Loser", "Row Jimmy", "Alabama Getaway", "Black Peter", "Hell in a Bucket"
- Second set: "Mississippi Half-Step Uptown Toodeloo" → "Wharf Rat" → "Eyes of the World" → "He's Gone" → "Drums" → "Space" → "I Need a Miracle" → "Death Don't Have No Mercy" → "Sugar Magnolia"
- Encore: "Brokedown Palace"

July 3 – Chicago, Illinois

- First set: "Box of Rain", "Jack Straw", "Bertha" → "Passenger", "The Wheel" → "Crazy Fingers" → "The Music Never Stopped"
- Second set: "Mason's Children" → "Scarlet Begonias" → "Fire on the Mountain" → "Drums" → "Space" → "New Potato Caboose" → "Playing in the Band" → "Let It Grow" → "Help on the Way" → "Slipknot!" → "Franklin's Tower"
- Encore: "Ripple"

July 4 – Chicago, Illinois

- First set: "Shakedown Street", "Liberty", "Standing on the Moon", "Me and My Uncle", "Tennessee Jed", "Cumberland Blues", "Little Red Rooster", "Friend of the Devil", "Deal"
- Second set: "Bird Song", "The Golden Road (To Unlimited Devotion)", "Lost Sailor" → "Saint of Circumstance", "West L.A. Fadeaway", "Foolish Heart", "Drums" → "Space" → "Stella Blue" → "One More Saturday Night"
- Encore: "U.S. Blues"

July 5 – Chicago, Illinois

- First set: "China Cat Sunflower" → "I Know You Rider", "Estimated Prophet", "Built to Last", "Samson and Delilah", "Mountains of the Moon" → "Throwing Stones"
- Second set: "Truckin'", "Cassidy", "Althea", "Terrapin Station" → "Drums" → "Space" → "Unbroken Chain", "Days Between" → "Not Fade Away"
- Encore: "Touch of Grey", "Attics of My Life"

== Album ==
The Chicago "Fare Thee Well" concerts were released as a live album on November 20, 2015. There are three different versions of the recording:

- Fare Thee Well: Complete Box Set, a 12-CD and seven-DVD or Blu-ray box set that includes the complete audio and video of all three Chicago concerts. This is a limited edition of 20,000 numbered copies, and includes a bonus disc of behind-the-scenes footage directed by Justin Kreutzmann, the son of drummer Bill Kreutzmann. This set also includes three CDs consisting of the intermission music from each concert, performed by the band Circles Around the Sun, led by guitarist Neal Casal. Known as Interludes for the Dead, this music also was released separately as a two-disc album on November 27, 2015.
- Fare Thee Well: July 5, 2015, a three-CD and two-DVD or Blu-ray album of the audio and video of the July 5 concert.
- The Best of Fare Thee Well, a two-CD album of audio selections from the three Chicago concerts.

== Gallery ==
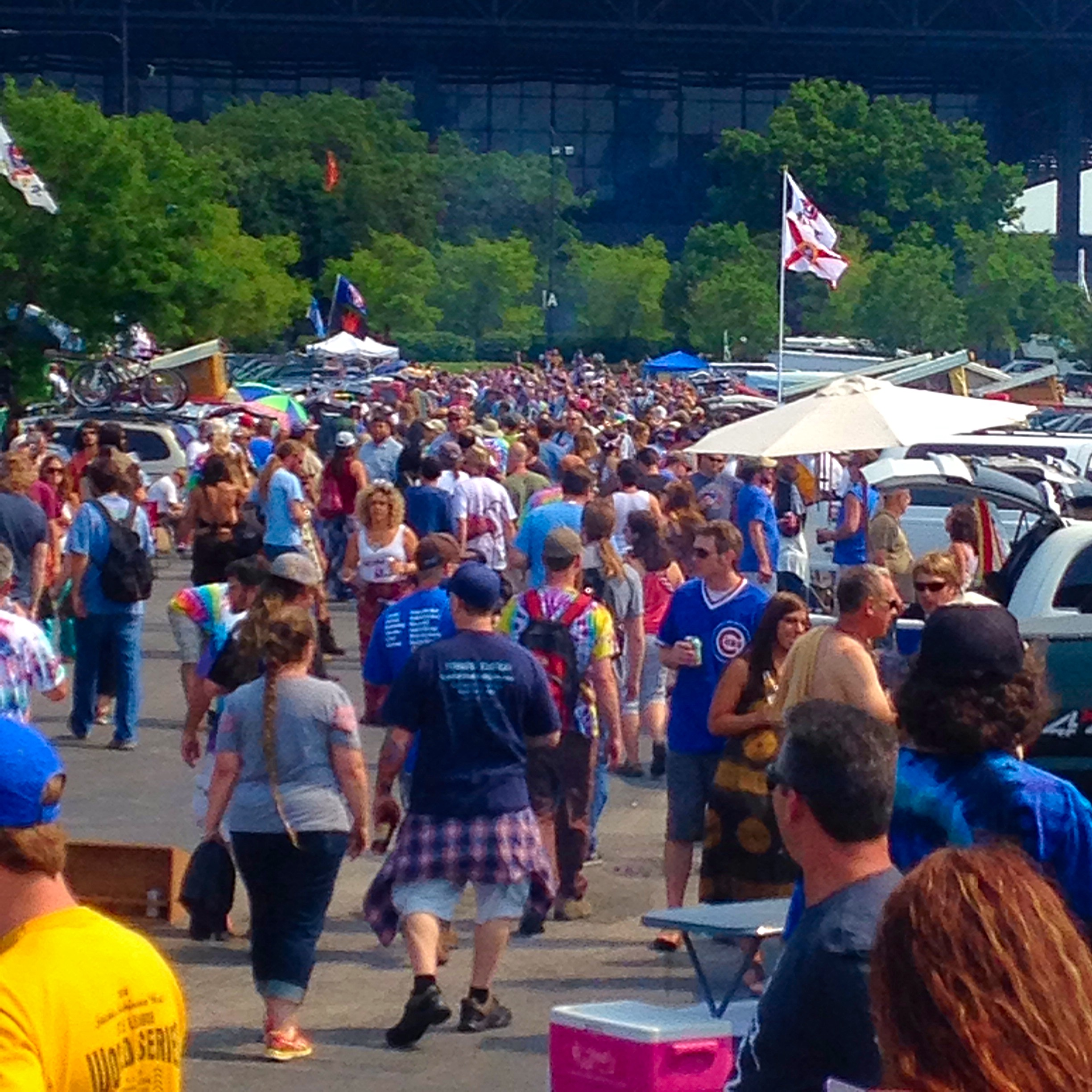
Deadheads at the July 3, 2015 show at Soldier Field, Chicago, Illinois

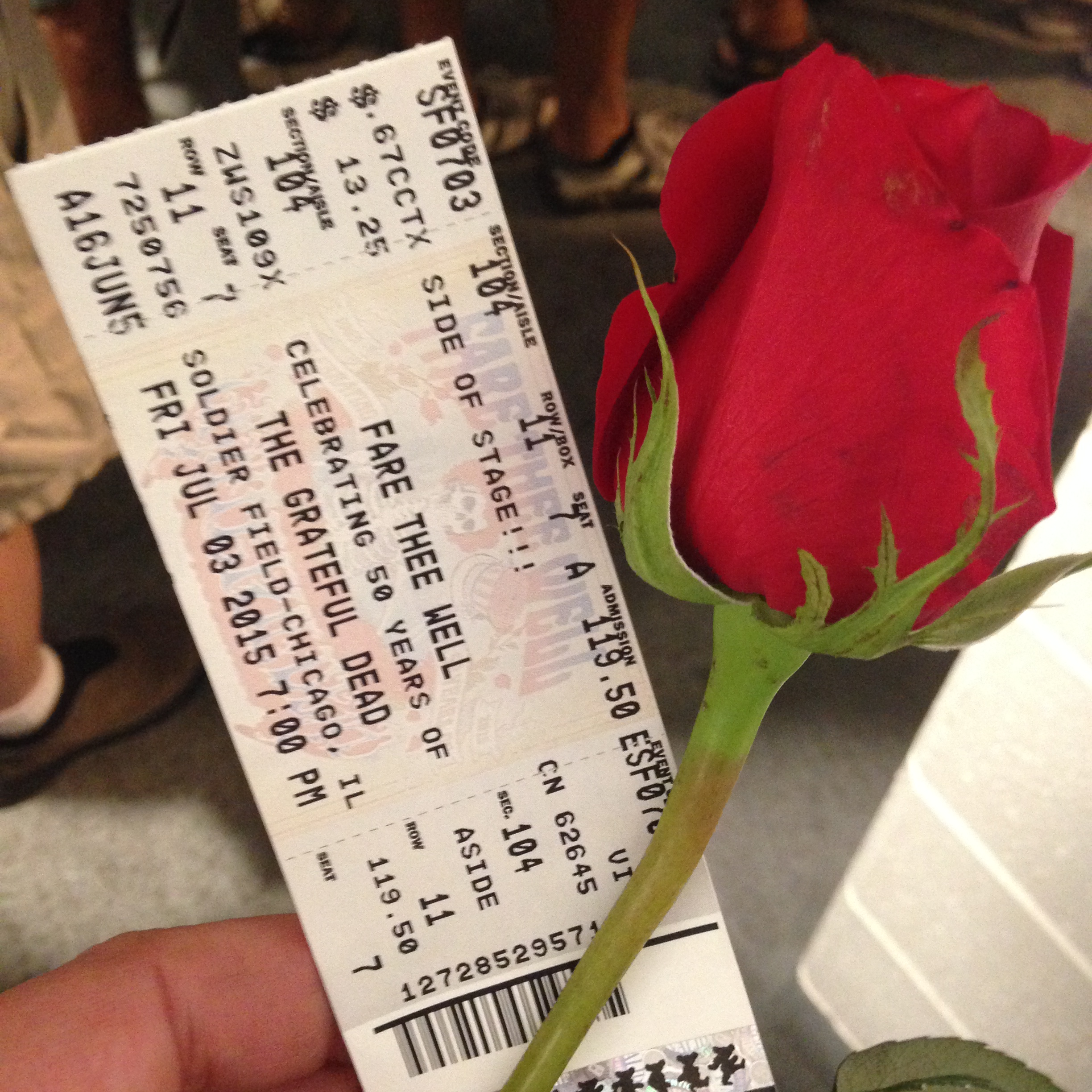
A concert ticket for the July 3, 2015 Chicago show

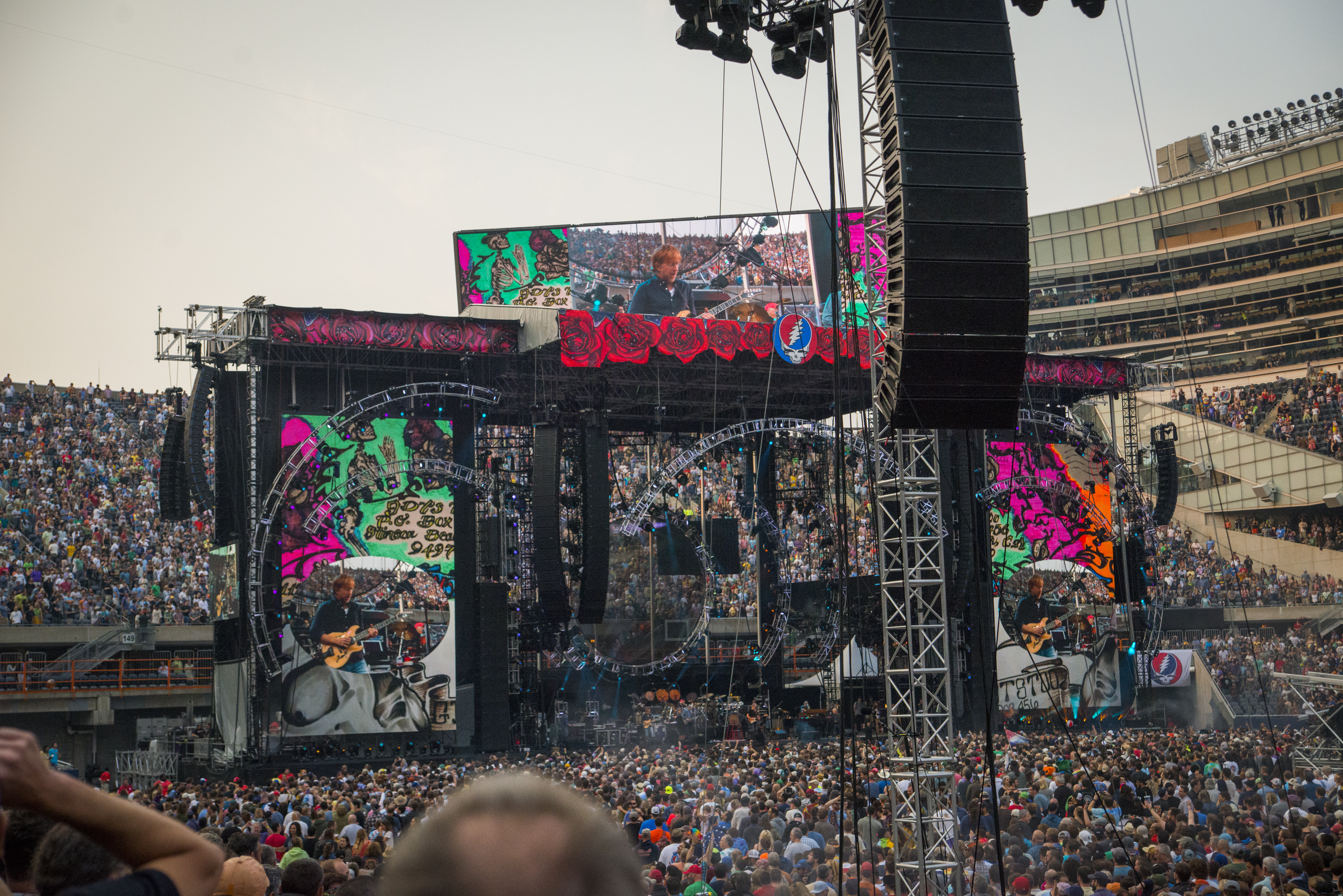
The band playing on July 3, 2015

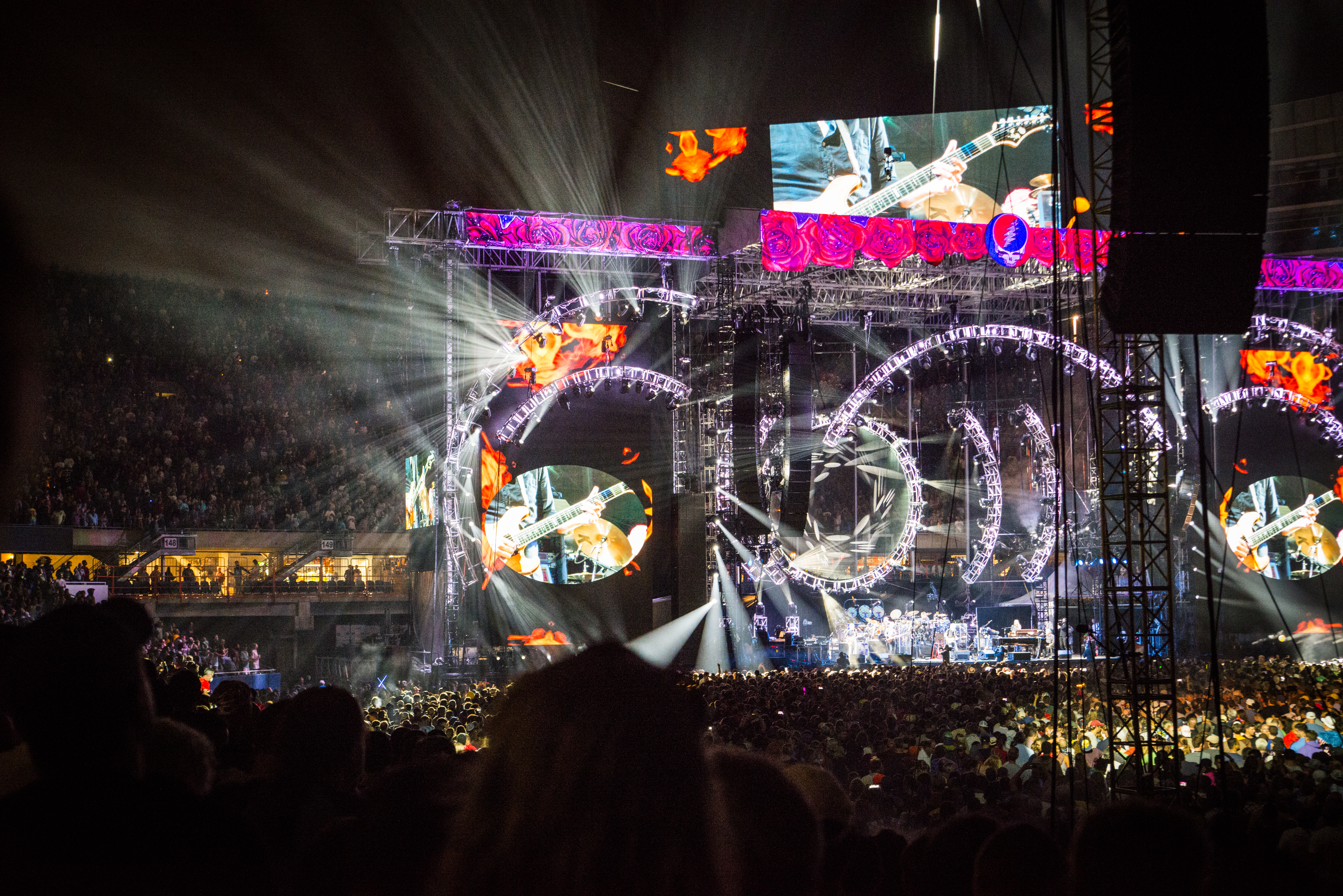
Lighting effects at the July 3, 2015 show

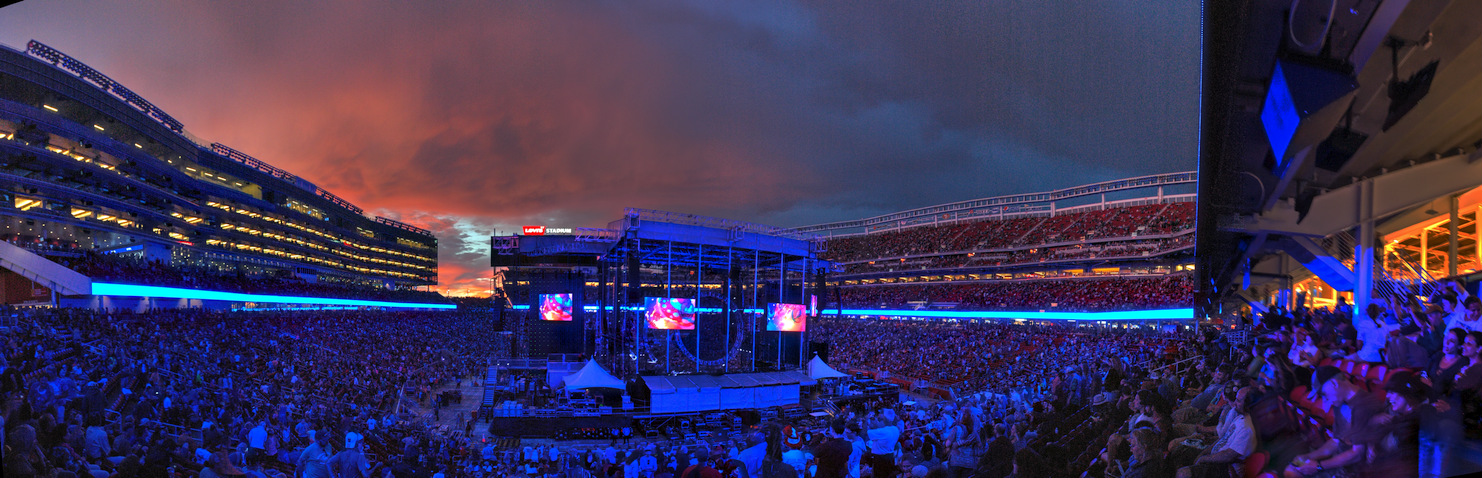
Behind the stage at Fare Thee Well on June 27, 2015, at Levi's Stadium, Santa Clara, California

== See also ==
- Dead & Company
- Reunions of the Grateful Dead
