= Attics of My Life =

Song by Grateful Dead

from the album American Beauty
- Released: November 1970
- Length: 5:12
- Label: Warner Bros.
- Composer: Jerry Garcia
- Lyricist: Robert Hunter
- Producers: Grateful Dead; Steve Barncard

"Attics of My Life" is a song by American rock band the Grateful Dead. It was released as the ninth track on the band's fourth studio album American Beauty (1970). Written by guitarist and vocalist Jerry Garcia with lyricist Robert Hunter, the song features group harmony vocals by Garcia, Bob Weir and Phil Lesh.

Despite never being a mainstay in the band's live sets, "Attics of My Life" has garnered a positive reception from writers and critics. Retrospectively, it has been included on lists of the band's best songs. It was the final encore at the Fare Thee Well: Celebrating 50 Years of the Grateful Dead series of concerts in 2015.

== Overview ==
Oliver Trager describes "Attics of My Life" as a "somber, melancholic ballad". However, its lyrics are "imbued with hopeful introspection". In a column for the band's official website, David Dodd suggests that it is not a "story song"; rather, it is an autobiographical track "about being a songwriter, and about the songwriter's relationship to something greater than him- or herself". Allison Rapp of Ultimate Classic Rock notes the influence of gospel music in the track. Shirley Halperin of Rolling Stone considers it to be a "secular hymn" and a "fitting segue from the Sixties to 1970", where "when hippie dreams collided with events like Atlamont and the Manson killings". According to the Los Angeles Times, Hunter himself informed a fan that it is "not a song about being stoned. It's a song about the soul [with] an affirmation on the concept of grace."

The song was not a frequent inclusion in the band's setlists. Trager notes its presence in "about fifteen" shows in 1970, in addition to a single performance in 1972, after which the song was shelved until 1989. It was the final encore for the Fare Thee Well: Celebrating 50 Years of the Grateful Dead run of shows in 2015, and was also performed by Grahame Lesh & Friends at Unbroken Chain: A Celebration of the Life & Music of Phil Lesh in 2026.

== Reception ==
"Attics of My Life" has been ranked as one of the band's greatest songs. Rolling Stone ranked it as the band's 39th-best, with Halperin praising its "reflection, grace, and quiet resignation", summarizing the song as "an acoustic masterpiece of complex harmonies and delicate interweaving guitars". The Los Angeles Times included it on their list of Hunter's 10 best Grateful Dead songs, praising the band's "angelic harmonizing" and likening its lyrics to Sufi poetry.
