= American Beauty (album) =

1970 studio album by Grateful Dead

Studio album by Grateful Dead
- Released: November 1, 1970
- Recorded: August–September 1970
- Studios: Wally Heider, San Francisco
- Genres: Folk rock; country rock; psychedelic rock
- Length: 42:21
- Label: Warner Bros.
- Producers: Grateful Dead; Steve Barncard

Grateful Dead chronology
| Vintage Dead (1970) | American Beauty (1970) | Historic Dead (1971) |

Singles from American Beauty
- 1. "Truckin'"/"Ripple" Released: January 1971

American Beauty is the fifth studio album (and sixth overall) by American rock band the Grateful Dead. Released on November 1, 1970, by Warner Bros. Records, the album continued the folk rock and country music style of their previous album Workingman's Dead, released earlier in the year.

Upon release, American Beauty entered the Billboard 200 chart, ultimately peaking at number 30 during a nineteen-week stay in January 1971. On July 11, 1974, the album was certified Gold by the Recording Industry Association of America (RIAA), and it later achieved Platinum and double Platinum certification in 1986 and 2001, respectively. In 2003, the album was ranked number 258 on Rolling Stone magazine's list of the "500 Greatest Albums of All Time", 261 in a 2012 revised list, and 215 in a 2020 revised list.

== Recording ==
American Beauty was the result of a prolific period of the songwriting partnership of Jerry Garcia and Robert Hunter – one that yielded two studio albums in one year for the Grateful Dead. This was the only time the band would return to the studio so quickly. However, unlike the previous effort, where almost all the songs were written solely by the pair, the album saw more input from the rest of the band. Included are Phil Lesh's "Box of Rain" and Bob Weir's "Sugar Magnolia", both written with Hunter, and "Operator", Ron "Pigpen" McKernan's only singing-songwriting effort on a Grateful Dead studio album.

The album was produced after the discovery that the band's manager, Lenny Hart (father of drummer Mickey Hart), had renewed their contract with Warner Brothers Records without their knowledge, and then skipped town with a sizable chunk of the band's wealth. In between near-constant touring and gigging, recording began only a few months after the release of Workingman's Dead – without their regular sound crew, who were out on the road as part of the Medicine Ball Caravan tour (which the Dead were originally scheduled to join). Instead, studio staff engineer Stephen Barncard replaced Bob Matthews as producer – "a move that irks Matthews to this day" (Matthews had co-produced the band's two previous albums). Barncard also mused "I had heard bad stories about engineers' interactions with the Dead but what I found were a bunch of hardworking guys".

Both Workingman's Dead and American Beauty were innovative at the time for their fusion of bluegrass, rock and roll, folk, and, especially, country music. Lyricist Hunter commented "We went back into American folk tradition but, being experimenters, nothing would do but that we try to reinvent that." Compared to Workingman's Dead, American Beauty had even less lead guitar work from Jerry Garcia, who increasingly filled the void with pedal steel guitar. It was also during the recording of this album that Garcia first collaborated with mandolinist David Grisman, a friend who had recently relocated to California following the dissolution of Earth Opera. "I just bumped into Jerry at a baseball game in Fairfax, and he said, 'Hey, you wanna play on this record we're doing?'" commented Grisman, whose playing is heard on "Friend of the Devil" and especially "Ripple". Howard Wales, another musician from outside of the band, added keyboards to three songs. Drummer Bill Kreutzmann commented, "Wales came to us through Jerry, who played with him in side projects. [He] had done session work with James Brown and the Four Tops before we brought him in for American Beauty." MIT student Ned Lagin, a jazz pianist who had corresponded with the band after attending their 1969 New Year's Eve concert at the Boston Tea Party, also contributed piano to "Candyman". Lagin subsequently sat in with the band on occasion from 1970 to 1975.

Phil Lesh, in his autobiography Searching for the Sound, commented "the magnetism of the scene at Wally Heider's recording studio made it a lot easier for me to deal with [the loss of my father] and my new responsibilities. Some of the best musicians around were hanging there during that period; with Paul Kantner and Grace Slick from Jefferson Airplane, the Dead, Santana, Crosby, Nash, and Neil Young working there, the studio became jammer heaven. Thank the Lord for music; it's a healing force beyond words to describe."

It was a surprise to us – as it was to everybody else: this machine-eating, monster-psychedelic band is suddenly putting out sweet, listenable material

— Robert Hunter

Though both albums focused on Americana songcraft, Workingman's Dead mixed the grittier Bakersfield sound with the band's psychedelic roots, whereas the mostly-acoustic American Beauty focused more on major-key melodies and folk harmonies, evincing the influence of Dylan and studio neighbors/friends Crosby, Stills, Nash, & Young. Kreutzmann later explained, "The singers in our band really learned a lot about harmonizing [from] Crosby, Stills, Nash & Young, who had just released their seminal album Déjà Vu. Jerry played pedal steel... on that record. Stephen Stills lived at Mickey's ranch... and David Crosby enjoyed partying as much as we did. So our circles overlapped."

Crosby has demurred on this point: "Sometimes they have given us credit for teaching them how to sing and that's not true. They knew how to sing; they had their own style and they had the most important quality of it down already, which is tale-telling". However, he has also stated "The idea is – when you hang out with other musicians – to sort of cross-pollinate your idea streams, and that naturally happened between us on a level that was very rare. We would listen to what they were doing with time signatures and with breaking the rules, and it appealed to us a lot."

== Release ==
American Beauty was released just over four months after Workingman's Dead. The title of the album has a double meaning, referring both to the musical focus on Americana and to the rose that is depicted on the front cover. Around the rose, the album title is scripted as a text ambigram that can also be read "American Reality". The back cover features a photograph by George Conger of a diorama containing ferns, roses, a bust, shadowboxes and other curios. To each side of the photo are illustrated panels with a vaguely-shaped guitar, whose strings are also rose stems. The cover artwork was produced by Kelley–Mouse Studios.

"Truckin' ", a blues/boogie-based rock tune with a shuffle rhythm, was also released as a single (backed with "Ripple"), and the songs "Box of Rain", "Sugar Magnolia", and "Friend of the Devil" also received radio airplay. The single version of "Truckin'" is a completely different mix, with extra lead guitar fills throughout, reverb on Weir's vocals, fewer verses, and without Wales's organ part. The autobiographical song became the one most associated with the band, and their track most commonly played on FM radio classic rock formats. In his book on Garcia, Blair Jackson noted that "if you liked rock'n'roll in 1970 but didn't like the Dead, you were out of luck, because they were inescapable that summer and fall".

American Beauty peaked at No. 30 on Billboard's Pop Albums chart, while the single, "Truckin'", peaked at No. 64 on the Pop Singles chart. It was the final album with Mickey Hart until his return to the band four years later, in 1975. Eight of the album's ten songs would remain in live setlists throughout the band's history.

The album was remixed for 5.1 surround in 2001 by Mickey Hart. This version is heavy in reverb and bass drum, and received mixed reviews, with one reviewer calling it "musically and sonically goofy".

It was remastered and expanded with eight bonus tracks as part of the box set The Golden Road (1965–1973) in 2001. This version was released separately in 2003.

A 50th Anniversary Deluxe Edition of American Beauty was released as a three-disc CD on October 30, 2020. Disc one is a newly remastered version of the album. Discs two and three are a live concert by the band, recorded on February 18, 1971, at the Capitol Theater in Port Chester, New York.

== Reception ==
Professional ratings
Review scores
| Source | Rating |
|---|---|
| AllMusic | 5/5 stars |
| Christgau's Record Guide | A− |
| The Encyclopedia of Popular Music | 5/5 stars |
| Pitchfork | 10/10 |
| Rolling Stone | 5/5 stars |

Andy Zwerling of Rolling Stone felt that the album was a continuation of Workingman's Dead, though there was more care and contentment in the singing, as well as the instrument playing being rich. Robert Christgau also compared the album to Workingman's Dead, feeling it was "sweeter vocally and more direct instrumentally". The Washington Post writer Tom Zito felt that the album showed "wisdom of age" when compared to their earlier works, while maintaining an "exuberance of youth." Jason Ankeny at AllMusic feels that the album is the Dead's "studio masterpiece", and in comparing it to Workingman's Dead, it is "more representative of the group as a collective unit".

In 2003, the album was ranked number 258 on Rolling Stone's list of the 500 greatest albums of all time. The American National Association of Recording Merchandisers placed the album at number 20 in its 2007 list of "definitive 200 albums". The album is included in the book 1001 Albums You Must Hear Before You Die and in 1991 Rolling Stone ranked American Beauty's album cover as the 63rd best of all time. It was voted number 103 in Colin Larkin's All Time Top 1000 Albums 3rd Edition (2000).

== Track listing ==
Side one
| No. | Title | Writer(s) | Lead vocals | Length |
|---|---|---|---|---|
| 1. | "Box of Rain" | Phil Lesh; Robert Hunter | Lesh | 5:18 |
| 2. | "Friend of the Devil" | Jerry Garcia; John Dawson; Hunter | Garcia | 3:24 |
| 3. | "Sugar Magnolia" | Bob Weir; Hunter | Weir | 3:19 |
| 4. | "Operator" | Ron McKernan | McKernan | 2:25 |
| 5. | "Candyman" | Garcia; Hunter | Garcia | 6:14 |
| Total length: | | | | 20:40 |

Side two
| No. | Title | Writer(s) | Lead vocals | Length |
|---|---|---|---|---|
| 1. | "Ripple" | Garcia; Hunter | Garcia | 4:09 |
| 2. | "Brokedown Palace" | Garcia; Hunter | Garcia | 4:09 |
| 3. | "Till the Morning Comes" | Garcia; Hunter | Garcia; Weir; Lesh | 3:08 |
| 4. | "Attics of My Life" | Garcia; Hunter | Garcia; Weir; Lesh | 5:12 |
| 5. | "Truckin'" | Garcia; Lesh; Weir; Hunter | Weir | 5:03 |
| Total length: | | | | 21:41 |

- Sides one and two were combined as tracks 1–10 on CD reissues.

2001/2003 reissue bonus tracks
| No. | Title | Writer(s) | Length |
|---|---|---|---|
| 11. | "Truckin'" (Single Version) | Garcia, Lesh, Weir, Hunter | 3:17 |
| 12. | "Friend of the Devil" (Live – May 15, 1970, at Fillmore East in New York City (Note: Later released with more selections from this date on Road Trips Volume 3 Number 3)) | Garcia, Dawson, Hunter | 4:21 |
| 13. | "Candyman" (Live – April 15, 1970, at Winterland Ballroom in San Francisco (Note: Later released with entire concert performance on 30 Trips Around the Sun)) | | 5:18 |
| 14. | "Till the Morning Comes" (Live – October 4, 1970, at Winterland Ballroom in San Francisco (Note: Another track from this date is a bonus on Workingman's Dead)) | | 3:20 |
| 15. | "Attics of My Life" (Live – June 6, 1970, at Fillmore West in San Francisco) | | 6:31 |
| 16. | "Truckin'" (Live – December 26, 1970, at Legion Stadium in El Monte, California) | Garcia, Lesh, Weir, Hunter | 10:10 |
| 17. | "Ripple" (Single Edit) | | 3:02 |
| 18. | "American Beauty radio promo" | | 1:11 |
| Total length: | | | 37:10 79:31 |

Notes

The final two tracks are unlisted

=== 50th Anniversary Deluxe Edition ===
Disc two - February 18, 1971 (Set 1) – Capitol Theatre, Port Chester, New York
| No. | Title | Writer(s) | Length |
|---|---|---|---|
| 1. | "Bertha" (Single Version) | Garcia, Hunter | 6:20 |
| 2. | "Truckin'" | | 9:14 |
| 3. | "It Hurts Me Too" | Elmore James, Tampa Red | 5:56 |
| 4. | "Loser" | Garcia, Hunter | 6:55 |
| 5. | "Greatest Story Ever Told" | Weir, Hunter | 3:48 |
| 6. | "Johnny B. Goode" | Chuck Berry | 3:08 |
| 7. | "Mama Tried" | Merle Haggard | 3:22 |
| 8. | "Hard to Handle" | Alvertis Isbell, Allen Jones, Otis Redding | 9:14 |
| 9. | "Dark Star" | Hunter, Garcia, Mickey Hart, Kreutzmann, Lesh, McKernan, Weir | 7:02 |
| 10. | "Wharf Rat" | Garcia, Hunter | 7:24 |
| 11. | "Dark Star" | | 7:21 |
| 12. | "Me and My Uncle" | John Phillips | 4:13 |
| Total length: | | | 73:57 116:18 |

Disc three - February 18, 1971 (Set 2) – Capitol Theatre, Port Chester, New York
| No. | Title | Writer(s) | Length |
|---|---|---|---|
| 1. | "Casey Jones" | Garcia, Hunter | 7:38 |
| 2. | "Playing in the Band" | Weir, Hart, Hunter | 6:11 |
| 3. | "Me and Bobby McGee" | Kris Kristofferson, Fred Foster | 6:35 |
| 4. | "Candyman" | | 7:59 |
| 5. | "Big Boss Man" | Luther Dixon, Al Smith | 5:42 |
| 6. | "Sugar Magnolia" | | 7:12 |
| 7. | "St. Stephen" | Hunter, Garcia, Lesh | 6:26 |
| 8. | "Not Fade Away" | Buddy Holly, Norman Petty | 4:31 |
| 9. | "Goin' Down the Road Feeling Bad" | traditional, arranged by Grateful Dead | 5:03 |
| 10. | "Not Fade Away" | | 4:00 |
| 11. | "Uncle John's Band" | Garcia, Hunter | 6:39 |
| Total length: | | | 67:56 184:14 |

== American Beauty: The Angel's Share ==
American Beauty: The Angel's Share

Studio album by Grateful Dead
- Released: October 15, 2020
- Recorded: August–September 1970
- Studio: Wally Heider Studios
- Label: Rhino

Grateful Dead chronology
| Dave's Picks Volume 35 (2020) | American Beauty: The Angel's Share (2020) | Dave's Picks Volume 36 (2020) |

On October 15, 2020, a collection of demos and outtakes from the American Beauty recording sessions entitled American Beauty: The Angel's Share was released in streaming and digital download formats.

=== Track listing ===
American Beauty: The Angel's Share
| No. | Title | Length |
|---|---|---|
| 1. | "Friend Of The Devil (Demo)" | 3:29 |
| 2. | "Sugar Magnolia (Demo)" | 3:25 |
| 3. | "Candyman (Demo)" | 5:42 |
| 4. | "To Lay Me Down (Demo)" | 5:49 |
| 5. | "Truckin’ (Demo)" | 4:14 |
| 6. | "Hand Me Down (Ripple) [Demo]" | 4:07 |
| 7. | "Brokedown Palace (Demo)" | 3:56 |
| 8. | "Til The Morning Comes In (Demo)" | 4:03 |
| 9. | "Attics Of My Life (Demo)" | 4:58 |
| 10. | "Operator (Demo)" | 2:24 |
| 11. | "Box Of Rain (Acoustic Mix)" | 5:24 |
| 12. | "Candyman (Alternate Take)" | 7:45 |
| 13. | "Truckin’ (Alternate Mix)" | 5:41 |
| 14. | "Operator (Take 1) [Slated]" | 3:07 |
| 15. | "Operator (Take 2 Breakdown) [Slated]" | 0:24 |
| 16. | "Operator (Take 3) [Slated]" | 2:48 |
| 17. | "Operator (Take 4 Breakdown) [Slated]" | 0:24 |
| 18. | "Operator (Take 5) [Misnamed as Take 6] [Slated]" | 2:53 |
| 19. | "Operator (Take 6 Breakdown) [Slated]" | 0:14 |
| 20. | "Operator (Take 7 Breakdown) [Slated]" | 0:12 |
| 21. | "Operator (Take 8) [Slated]" | 2:44 |
| 22. | "Friend Of The Devil (Take 1 Breakdown) [Slated]" | 0:21 |
| 23. | "Friend Of The Devil (Take 2 Breakdown) [Slated]" | 0:50 |
| 24. | "Friend Of The Devil (Take 3 Breakdown) [Slated]" | 0:33 |
| 25. | "Friend Of The Devil (Take 4 Breakdown) [Slated]" | 0:33 |
| 26. | "Friend Of The Devil (Take 5) [Slated]" | 3:37 |
| 27. | "Friend Of The Devil (Take 6) [Slated]" | 3:32 |
| 28. | "Friend Of The Devil (Take 7) [Slated]" | 3:42 |
| 29. | "Friend Of The Devil (Arranging Take 1) [Not Slated]" | 2:18 |
| 30. | "Friend Of The Devil (Arranging Take 2) [Not Slated]" | 1:30 |
| 31. | "Friend Of The Devil (Arranging Take 3) [Not Slated]" | 1:05 |
| 32. | "Friend Of The Devil (Take 9 Breakdown) [Slated]" | 0:16 |
| 33. | "Friend Of The Devil (Take 10 Breakdown) [Slated]" | 0:27 |
| 34. | "Friend Of The Devil (Take 11) [Slated]" | 0:35 |
| 35. | "Friend Of The Devil (Take 12 Breakdown) [Slated]" | 0:08 |
| 36. | "Friend Of The Devil (Take 13) [Not Slated]" | 3:29 |
| 37. | "Friend Of The Devil (Take 14 Breakdown) [Slated]" | 0:17 |
| 38. | "Friend Of The Devil (Take 15) [Slated]" | 3:32 |
| 39. | "Friend Of The Devil (Take 16) [Slated]" | 3:35 |
| 40. | "Friend Of The Devil (Take 17) [Slated]" | 3:48 |
| 41. | "Friend Of The Devil (Take 18) [Slated]" | 0:39 |
| 42. | "Friend Of The Devil (Take 19) [Not Slated]" | 3:35 |
| 43. | "Friend Of The Devil (Take 20) [Slated]" | 3:39 |
| 44. | "Attics Of My Life (Take 1) [Slated]" | 5:54 |
| 45. | "Attics Of My Life (Take 2 Breakdown) [Slated]" | 0:23 |
| 46. | "Attics Of My Life (Take 3 Breakdown) [Slated]" | 2:53 |
| 47. | "Attics Of My Life (Take 4 Breakdown) [Slated]" | 0:46 |
| 48. | "Attics Of My Life (Take 5) [Slated]" | 5:39 |
| 49. | "Attics Of My Life (Solo Version)" | 5:14 |
| 50. | "Hand Me Down (Ripple) [Take 1 Breakdown] [Slated]" | 1:12 |
| 51. | "Hand Me Down (Ripple) [Take 2 with Vocals] [Slated]" | 3:37 |
| 52. | "Hand Me Down (Ripple) [Take 3] [Slated]" | 3:43 |
| 53. | "Hand Me Down (Ripple) [Take 4] [Slated]" | 3:46 |
| 54. | "Hand Me Down (Ripple) [Take 5 Breakdown] [Slated]" | 1:33 |
| 55. | "Hand Me Down (Ripple) [Take 6 Breakdown] [Slated]" | 0:42 |
| 56. | "Hand Me Down (Ripple) [Take 7] [Slated]" | 3:36 |

== Personnel ==
Grateful Dead

- Jerry Garcia – guitar, pedal steel, piano, vocals
- Mickey Hart – percussion
- Robert Hunter – lyrics
- Bill Kreutzmann – drums
- Phil Lesh – bass guitar, guitar, piano, vocals
- Pigpen (Ron McKernan) – harmonica, vocals, lyrics on "Operator"
- Bob Weir – guitar, vocals

Additional musicians

- David Grisman – mandolin on "Friend of the Devil", "Ripple"
- David Nelson – electric guitar on "Box of Rain"
- Ned Lagin – piano on "Candyman"
- Dave Torbert – bass guitar on "Box of Rain"
- Howard Wales – organ on "Candyman", "Truckin'"; piano on "Brokedown Palace"

Technical personnel

- Produced by Grateful Dead
- Co-producer, audio: Stephen Barncard
- Dave Collins – pre-mastering assistance
- Artwork: Kelley/Mouse Studios
- Rear photo: George Conger

Reissue personnel

- James Austin – producer
- David Lemieux – producer
- Peter McQuaid – executive producer
- Michael Wesley Johnson – associate producer, research coordinator
- Eileen Law – archival research
- Cassidy Law – project coordinator
- Eric Doney – business affairs
- Nancy Mallonee – business affairs
- Malia Doss – business affairs
- Dennis McNally – Grateful mentor
- Jeffrey Norman – additional mixing
- Joe Gastwirt – mastering, production consultant
- Jimmy Edwards – project manager
- Joe Motta – project coordinator
- Gary Peterson – discography annotation
- Shawn Amos – liner notes coordinator
- Vanessa Atkins – editorial supervision
- Daniel Goldmark – editorial research
- Hugh Brown – reissue art direction
- Greg Allen – reissue art direction
- Rachel Gutek – reissue art direction
- Design: Rachel Gutek – design
- Greg Allen – design

== Charts ==
=== Weekly charts ===
| Chart (1970–1971) | Peak position |
|---|---|
| Australian Kent Music Report | 34 |
| Canadian RPM 100 Albums | 43 |
| UK Albums Chart | 27 |
| US Billboard Top LP's | 30 |
| US Cash Box Top 100 Albums | 24 |
| US Record World Album Chart | 15 |

| Chart (2020–2023) | Peak position |
|---|---|
| Hungarian Albums (MAHASZ) | 29 |
| US Billboard 200 | 19 |
| US Top Rock Albums (Billboard) | 3 |

== Certifications ==
| Region | Certification | Certified units/sales |
|---|---|---|
| United States (RIAA) | 2× Platinum | 2,000,000^{^} |
^{^} Shipments figures based on certification alone.

== Release history ==
The album has been released in a multitude of ways since its original release. In 2001, the CD version was remastered and expanded with live tracks and singles for The Golden Road (1965–1973) 12-CD box set. This version was given individual release in 2003. Additionally in 2001, a standalone DVD-Audio version was released including a 5.1 Surround Sound mix. On October 24, 2004, the album was released as a DualDisc recording, including a DVD side with interviews with Mickey Hart and Bob Weir, a photo gallery, and lyrics to all songs. In 2006 it was released in a CD replica of the original vinyl edition, with period labels and inner sleeve.

| Region | Date | Label | Format | Catalog |
|---|---|---|---|---|
| United States | 1970-11-01 | Warner Bros. | LP | WS 1893 |
| United States | 1978 | Mobile Fidelity Sound Lab | LP | MFS-1-014 |
| Worldwide | 1987 | Warner Bros. | Compact Disc | 1893-2 |
| Worldwide | 1987 | Warner Bros. | Cassette tape | M5-1893 |
| Worldwide | 1990 | Warner Bros. | LP | 1893 |
| United States | 2001 | Rhino | DVD-Audio | 74385 |
| United States | 2003 | Rhino | CD | 74397† |
| United States | 2003 | Rhino | LP | 74397† |
| United States | 2004-10-24 | Warner Bros./Rhino | DualDisc | 74385 |
| United States | 2007 | Grateful Dead | CD | 74794 |
| Worldwide | 2007 | Rhino | CD | 1893 |
| Worldwide | 2007 | WEA/Rhino | LP | 8122736821 |

† Re-mastered edition with bonus tracks

== See also ==
- Anthem to Beauty – a 1997 documentary on the making of American Beauty and Anthem of the Sun
- So Many Roads (1965–1995) – a 1999 box set that includes the outtake "To Lay Me Down"
- The Warner Bros. Studio Albums – a 2010 box set which includes this album
