= The Grateful Dead Channel =

- Broadcast area: United States; Canada
- Frequencies: Sirius XM Radio 23; Dish Network 6023

Programming
- Format: The Grateful Dead

Ownership
- Owner: Sirius XM Radio

History
- First air date: September 7, 2007

Technical information
- Class: Satellite Radio Station

Links
- Website: The Grateful Dead Channel

The Grateful Dead Channel is a Sirius XM Radio channel playing music spanning American rock band The Grateful Dead's entire career including unreleased concert recordings.

It also has featured original shows hosted by band members Bob Weir, Mickey Hart, Phil Lesh, and Bill Kreutzmann. Rare archival interviews with Jerry Garcia are also featured. Another prime feature is Today in Grateful Dead History, in which the Dead's official archivist, David Lemieux, plays a selection from the Dead's touring past that took place on or near that date, together with his personal remembrances of particular venues and interpretations of what stretches were or were not artistically successful for the group. The Channel also broadcast live the band's 2015 Fare Thee Well shows.

This channel was originally on Sirius Satellite Radio. It airs on Sirius XM Radio channel 23 and on Dish Network channel 6023.
