= Tales of the Great Rum Runners =

Studio album by Robert Hunter
- Released: 1974
- Studio: Rolling Thunder Studio
- Length: 40:47
- Label: Round Records
- Producer: Mickey Hart

Robert Hunter chronology
Tales of the Great Rum Runners (1974)	Tiger Rose (1975)

Singles from Tales of the Great Rum Runners
- 1. "Rum Runners" b/w "It Must Have Been the Roses" Released: 1974

Tales of the Great Rum Runners is the debut solo album by the American musician and lyricist Robert Hunter, released in 1974 by Round Records.

== Release and reception ==
Professional ratings
Review scores
Source	Rating
AllMusic	3/5 stars

AllMusic writer William Ruhlmann wrote in his review of the album that Hunter "demonstrated the musical and lyrical approach that had made his co-compositions with Jerry Garcia the best of the Dead's original material", noting that "Hunter's poetic language was redolent with a rustic Americana of roads, rivers, roses, and rain, and if his melodies lacked Garcia's grace and the backup lacked the Dead's cohesion, nevertheless this was identifiably music in the Dead vein", concluding that "Hunter demonstrated he was more than just a lyricist" on the album. In a Billboard review, the writers wrote Hunter has "come up with a fine set of his own", noting that "he has come up with a set that should receive immediate and strong FM play". Writing for Record World, the writers wrote Hunter "steps into the limelight with this flavorsome first release", noting that "That Train" and "Standing at Your Door" highlight the country-oriented set." Cashbox wrote in their review that it was "one of the better we've heard so far this year," noting that it "Looks like another star's emerging"

Four tracks on the album were included on the 1982 compilation album Promontory Rider: A Retrospective Collection.

In 1993, Rykodisc rereleased the album on compact disc with no bonus tracks.

On June 7, 2024, a 2CD reissue of the album was released by Rhino Entertainment.

== Track listing ==
Side one
No.	Title	Length
1.	"Lady Simplicity"	0:20
2.	"That Train"	4:33
3.	"Dry Dusty Road"	2:18
4.	"I Heard You Singing"	3:36
5.	"Rum Runners"	3:01
6.	"Children's Lament"	4:15
7.	"Maybe She's a Bluebird"	1:57

Side two
No.	Title	Length
1.	"Boys in the Barroom"	1:09
2.	"It Must Have Been the Roses"	3:30
3.	"Arizona Lightning"	3:32
4.	"Standing at Your Door"	4:31
5.	"Mad"	4:12
6.	"Keys to the Rain"	4:15
Total length:		40:47

== Personnel ==
According to the album's liner notes:

- Robert Hunter – guitar, vocals
- Peter Albin – bass
- Rodney Albin – vocals, fiddle
- Maureen Aylett – vocals, spoons
- T. Will Claire – vocals
- Hadi El Sadoon – trumpet
- Snooky Flowers – saxophone
- David Freiberg – bass
- Jerry Garcia – guitar
- Donna Godchaux – vocals
- Keith Godchaux – keyboards
- Mickey Hart – drums
- Barry Melton – guitar
- Jamie Paris – harp
- Steve Schuster – saxophone
- Markee Shubb – mandolin
- Rick Shubb – banjo
- Robbie Stokes – guitar
