= New Speedway Boogie =

Song by Grateful Dead

from the album Workingman's Dead
- A-side: "Uncle John's Band"
- Released: June 14, 1970
- Length: 4:05
- Label: Warner Bros.
- Composer: Jerry Garcia
- Lyricist: Robert Hunter
- Producers: Bob Matthews; Betty Cantor; Grateful Dead

"New Speedway Boogie" is a song by the American rock band Grateful Dead, released as the fourth track on their fourth studio album Workingman's Dead (1970).

== Background ==
"New Speedway Boogie" is about the disastrous Altamont Free Concert, where the Grateful Dead were supposed to perform before the Rolling Stones. Being more specific, Robert Hunter said in his book A Box of Rain that the song was "written as a reply to an indictment of the Altamont affair by pioneering rock critic Ralph J. Gleason".

== Release and reception ==
In a review for AllMusic, Matthew Greenwald called it "One of the heavier songs on the Workingman's Dead album", noting that "The lyrics are slightly impressionistic, yet the point about the Stones (and particularly Mick Jagger) had obviously bit off more than they could chew out of the counterculture apple" concluding by adding "Musically, the band sounds more relaxed in a rock/blues setting than they ever have, and the loose, blues-boogie is a perfect vehicle for the band." Author Buzz Poole believed it could be "the best known and one of the few explicitly topical songs the Dead ever recorded." American Songwriter critic Jim Beviglia writes that it "introduces a touch of R&B shimmy to the proceedings, even as Hunter’s lyrics deliver hip, cosmic wisdom." Classic Rock writer Max Bell states that Ron McKernan's "throaty interjection brought to mind the danger associated with biker gangs who attached themselves to hippie rock groups." Rolling Stone Australia placed it number 49 in their list of Jerry Garcia's 50 greatest songs, calling it "Hunter’s indictment of journalist Ralph Gleason’s take on the festival."

== Cover versions ==
Australian musician Courtney Barnett performed a cover of the song on The Tonight Show Starring Jimmy Fallon on June 27, 2016 when she was the show's music guest for that episode. Other covers include many live covers by Dead & Company, and Marc Cohn, whose version was released on his album Listening Booth: 1970.
