= Lenny Hart =

American drummer (1919–1975)

Leonard Hart (September 19, 1919 – February 2, 1975) was an American drummer who owned and operated Hart Music, selling drums and musical instruments in San Carlos, California. He was the father of Mickey Hart, one of the percussionists for the Grateful Dead. Lenny Hart was also the Grateful Dead's original money manager. In March, 1970, he disappeared along with approximately US$155,000 of the group's profits.

Hart was located by a private detective and arrested in San Diego on July 26, 1971, while baptizing people and using the name "Rev. Lenny B. Hart". He was convicted of criminal embezzlement and sentenced to six months in jail.

The Grateful Dead song "He's Gone" is based on Lenny Hart's embezzlement of band money and subsequent disappearance. As a result of the fiasco, Mickey Hart, feeling ashamed of his father's actions, left the band in February 1971, not returning to the group on a full-time basis until 1975.

Lenny Hart died of natural causes on February 2, 1975. He had been teaching music in Mill Valley since his release from prison. According to Dennis McNally, "Mickey went to the funeral home, cleared the room, took out the snakewood sticks that had been his inheritance, played a traditional rudimental drum piece, "The Downfall of Paris" on Lenny's coffin, and split."
