= Ripple (song) =

1970 single by Grateful Dead

Single by Grateful Dead

from the album American Beauty
- A-side: "Truckin'"
- Released: November 1, 1970
- Recorded: September 1970
- Genre: Folk rock
- Length: 4:09
- Label: Warner Bros.
- Songwriters: Jerry Garcia; Robert Hunter
- Producers: Grateful Dead; Steve Barncard

Grateful Dead singles chronology
""Uncle John's Band" /"New Speedway Boogie"" (1970)	"Ripple" (1970)	""Johnny B. Goode"/"So Fine"" (1972)

"Ripple" is the sixth song on the Grateful Dead album American Beauty. It was released as the B-side to the single "Truckin'".

== Background ==
Robert Hunter reportedly wrote “Brokedown Palace” and “To Lay Me Down” and “Ripple” on one day in early 1970 inspired by “a bottle of Retsina and a beautiful London day”.

Jerry Garcia set “Ripple” to music that summer, during another iconic moment: when The Grateful Dead were on the famous Canadian train tour known as the Festival Express, alongside Janis Joplin, the Band, Flying Burrito Brothers, among others. Garcia reportedly wrote the melody during sunrise, creating the blissfully uplifting centerpiece of American Beauty that remains one of the most beloved songs in the Grateful Dead catalog. The song debuted 18 August 1970 at Fillmore West in San Francisco.

"Ripple" has a similar melody to the gospel hymn "Because He Lives," which was published a year later. Both songs are similar to "Any Dream Will Do" from the Andrew Lloyd Webber–Tim Rice musical Joseph and the Amazing Technicolor Dreamcoat, which was first performed in 1968, and recorded in 1969.

Let it be known there is a fountain
That was not made by the hands of men

That’s pretty much my favorite line I ever wrote - that’s ever popped into my head...

— Robert Hunter

== In popular culture ==
A number of essays have been written analyzing and annotating this song.

The 1985 drama film Mask, with Cher and Eric Stoltz, features this song.

The song is played during the last scene of the television series Freaks and Geeks.

== Reception ==
In 2024, Rolling Stone ranked the song at number 334 in their updated list of the 500 Greatest Songs of All Time.

In August 2026, Rolling Stone ranked "Ripple" as the third-best Grateful Dead song of all time.
