= Friend of the Devil =

Song by Grateful Dead

from the album American Beauty
- Released: November 1970
- Genre: Folk rock, progressive bluegrass
- Label: Warner Bros.
- Composers: Jerry Garcia and John Dawson
- Lyricist: Robert Hunter
- Producers: Grateful Dead, Steve Barncard

"Friend of the Devil" is a song by the Grateful Dead and recorded as the second track of the Dead's 1970 album American Beauty. The music was written by Jerry Garcia and John Dawson and the lyrics are by Robert Hunter. Like most of American Beauty, the song is largely acoustic. It opens with Garcia playing a descending G major scale (G F# E D C B A G) in the bass register.

== Lyrics and narrative ==
The song follows an unnamed person on the run from his wives, a sheriff, twenty hounds, and the Devil. His journey begins in Reno, Nevada, there are mentions of wives in the California towns of Chino and Cherokee, and spending a night in a cave in Utah, as the person attempts to return home to rest. In the end, their fate remains unresolved.

== Performances and variations ==
The song was introduced in concert on March 20, 1970, at the Capitol Theatre in Port Chester, New York.

Following the group's October 1974–June 1976 touring hiatus, the song was performed in a significantly slower arrangement with extended guitar and keyboard solos. In more recent history, Phil Lesh and Friends have performed a more uptempo version similar to the original.

== Other versions and lyrics ==
Hunter plays a slightly different version on his album (released only in LP format) Jack O'Roses. He adds a final verse:

"You can borrow from the Devil/ You can borrow from a friend/ But the Devil'll give you twenty/ When your friend got only ten"

== Covers ==
- New Riders of the Purple Sage, which featured John Dawson, who along with Jerry Garcia wrote the music, recorded this on their twelfth studio album Keep On Keepin' On in 1989.
- Chris Smither originally released it on his 1972 album Don't It Drag On and covered the song on his live studio album Another Way to Find You, recorded in 1989 and released in 1991.
- During their 1994 Bridge School Benefit set Ministry played the song. A live recording from the show can be found on the 1997 compilation The Bridge School Concerts, Vol. 1.
- Tony Rice, Larry Rice, Chris Hillman and Herb Pedersen covered the song on their 1999 album, Rice, Rice, Hillman & Pedersen.
- Loggins and Messina, whose version of the song was slowed down.
- Bob Dylan and Tom Petty also both have covered the song in concert, including Petty's 1997 rendition of the track available on his album The Live Anthology and his live performance at 2013's Hangout Festival. A live version of Dylan's was released on Stolen Roses (Songs Of The Grateful Dead).
- In 2002, Norway's top country-rock band, Hellbillies covered the song on their live album Cool Tur (Cool Tour). The song was performed with Norwegian lyrics by Arne Moslåtten and is known as "Hinnmann og eg" ("The devil and I" in English).
- In 2003, Counting Crows included a slower-tempo cover of the song on their compilation album Films About Ghosts. While reproducing the acoustic riff, the Counting Crows version also adds electric keyboard and guitar instrumentation at about midway through the song. The band covered the song again on their 2013 live album Echoes of the Outlaw Roadshow.
- Elvis Costello and Keller Williams have also covered this song in concert.
- In 2008, the song was used in the introduction to an episode of Adult Swim's Lucy, the Daughter of the Devil, sung by the Devil (Lucy's father) and Terry, the Devil's sentient teratoma.
- A version by Lyle Lovett exists on his compilation Here I Am — The Lyle Lovett Collection and on the album Deadicated: A Tribute to the Grateful Dead. Both were released in 1991.
- In 2011, Cosmo Jarvis covered the song Video on YouTube for TheMusic in Australia.
- In 2013, Tom Petty and the Heartbreakers covered this song at both the 2013 Hangout Music Festival and the 2013 Bonnaroo Music Festival. A version from 1997 can be found on his Live at the Fillmore 1997 album.
- John Mayer covered this song on his 2013 Born and Raised World Tour
- Ramblin' Jack Elliott recorded a cover version for his album Friends of Mine in 1998
- Dave Matthews Band (with guest Béla Fleck) covered this song at Saratoga Performing Arts Center on July 4, 2015 to commemorate the Grateful Dead's remaining members' final performances together, which were taking place the same weekend at Soldier Field in Chicago.
- Mumford & Sons covered this song in 2016 as part of the Day of the Dead collaboration project.
- Jamey Johnson covered this song alongside Brent Cobb and Margo Price on his 2017 tour.
- In 2023, the Finnish country band Juippi & Juippi made a Finnish version of this song.
- Zach Bryan and John Mayer, Ann Arbor, Michigan at Michigan Stadium (2025)
