= Box of Rain =

1970 song by the Grateful Dead

Song by Grateful Dead

from the album American Beauty
- Released: November 1, 1970
- Recorded: August–September 1970
- Studio: Wally Heider (San Francisco)
- Genre: Folk rock, Americana
- Length: 5:18
- Label: Warner Bros.
- Songwriters: Phil Lesh, Robert Hunter
- Producers: Grateful Dead and Steve Barncard

"Box of Rain" is a song by the Grateful Dead, from their 1970 album American Beauty. The song was composed by bassist Phil Lesh and lyricist Robert Hunter, and sung by Lesh.

== The song ==
- Key: G
- Time signature: 4/4 (with an occasional 2/4 measure)
- Chords used: A, Bm7/A, A4, D, Am, Em, C, G, Bm

"Box of Rain" is drawn from American folk and country musical roots. This is true of many Grateful Dead tunes, including most of the songs on American Beauty and their other 1970 release, Workingman's Dead. As the first song on American Beauty, it was also the first Grateful Dead song released on record to feature Phil Lesh as the lead vocalist.

The song also featured two musicians who are not in the band. Dave Torbert played bass, while Lesh played acoustic guitar. David Nelson (of New Riders of the Purple Sage) plays the lead guitar with a Fender Telecaster, while Jerry Garcia plays the piano. Bob Weir sings harmony with Lesh and Garcia.

== Lyrics ==
According to lyricist Hunter, Lesh "wanted a song to sing to his dying father and had composed a piece complete with every vocal nuance but the words. If ever a lyric 'wrote itself,' this did—as fast as the pen would pull." Lesh practiced the song driving to the nursing home where his father lay with terminal cancer.

In an interview, Steve Silberman asked Hunter, "The song 'Box of Rain' began as a rough vocal outline from Phil Lesh. How does that process work?" Hunter replied, "Scat singing: Dum-dum dum, da-da-da-da, bump-dum-dum-dum-dum, dee-dee-dee. I'm able to translate people's scat. I hear English in it, almost as though I write down what I hear underneath that. I hear the intention. It's a talent like the Rubik's Cube, or something like that, and it comes easily to me. Which might be why I like language poetry. I can tell from the rhythms, or lack of rhythms, from the disjunctures and the end stoppages, what they're avoiding saying—the meaning that they would like to not be stating there, comes rushing through to me. I understand dogs. I can talk to babies." According to Hunter: "By 'box of rain,' I meant the world we live on, but 'ball' of rain didn't have the right ring to my ear, so box it became, and 'I don't know who put it there.'"

== Performance history ==
"Box of Rain" debuted on September 17, 1970, at the Fillmore East in New York City during the acoustic portion of the show. That performance was its sole appearance for nearly two years. The Grateful Dead reintroduced it in the fall of 1972 and played it on and off for the rest of the year and 1973 before dropping it again.

Between 1976 and 1985, Lesh seldom sang with the group (confining his contributions to harmony vocals on "Truckin'") due to vocal cord damage from improper singing. Over 750 concerts after its last performance, "Box of Rain" was revived on March 20, 1986, at the Coliseum in Hampton, Virginia. After that, the song was frequently played in response to chants from the audience. Before Jerry Garcia's death on August 9, 1995, "Box of Rain" was the last song ever performed live at a Grateful Dead concert, during the final encore at Soldier Field in Chicago on July 9, 1995. It was the first song played at the first Fare Thee Well show at Soldier Field on July 3, 2015.

Hunter recorded the song on his 1980 album Jack O'Roses.

The Dead-inspired jam band Phish opened its October 25, 2024, concert in Albany, New York, with "Box of Rain" in tribute to Lesh, who had died earlier that day.

== Reception ==
In 2024, Rolling Stone ranked the song 364th on its updated list of the 500 Greatest Songs of All Time.

In August 2026, Rolling Stone ranked "Box of Rain" as the second-best Grateful Dead song of all time.
