= Robert Hunter (lyricist) =

Lyricist and member of the Grateful Dead (1941–2019)

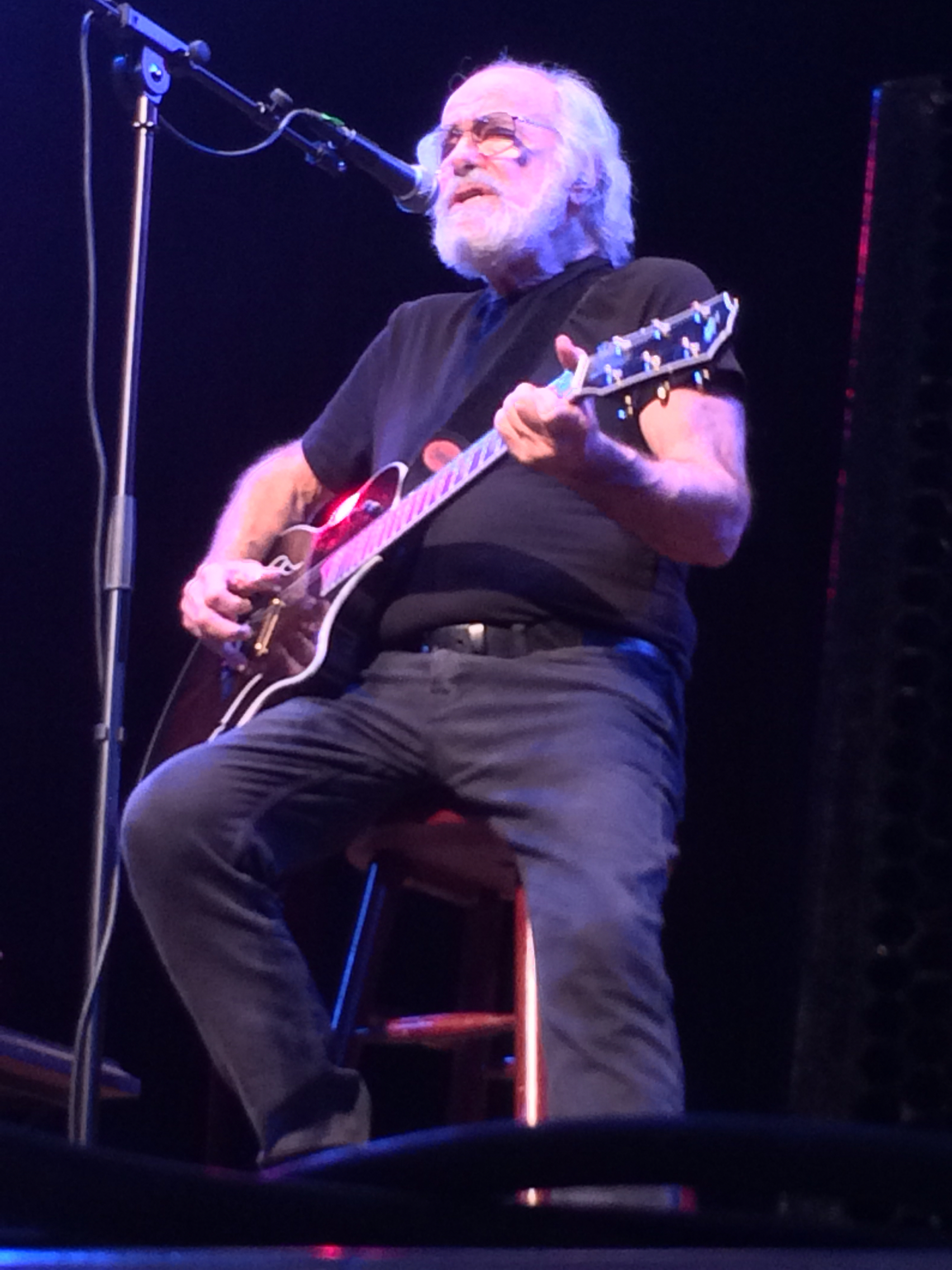
- Hunter in 2013

Background information
- Born: Robert Burns; June 23, 1941; Arroyo Grande, California, U.S.
- Died: September 23, 2019 (aged 78) San Rafael, California, U.S.
- Genres: Folk; bluegrass; country; rock and roll; psychedelia; blues
- Occupations: Musician; singer; songwriter; poet; translator
- Instruments: Guitar; vocals; mandolin
- Years active: 1961–2019
- Labels: Relix Records; Dark Star Records; Round Records
- Formerly of: Grateful Dead
- Website: www.dead.net/band/robert-hunter

Robert C. Christie Hunter (born Robert Burns; June 23, 1941 – September 23, 2019) was an American lyricist, singer-songwriter, translator and poet, best known for his work with the Grateful Dead. Born near San Luis Obispo, California, Hunter spent some time during his childhood in foster homes as a result of his father abandoning his family, and took refuge in reading and writing. He attended the University of Connecticut for a year before returning to Palo Alto, where he became friends with musician Jerry Garcia. Hunter and Garcia began a collaboration that lasted through the remainder of Garcia's life.

Garcia and others formed the Grateful Dead in 1965, and later began working with lyrics from Hunter, whom Garcia invited to join the band as a lyricist. Hunter contributed substantially to many of their albums, beginning with Aoxomoxoa in 1969. He wrote lyrics to a number of the band's signature songs, including "Dark Star", "Ripple", "Truckin' ", "China Cat Sunflower", and "Terrapin Station". Hunter was inducted into the Rock and Roll Hall of Fame with the Grateful Dead in 1994, and is the only non-performer to be inducted as a member of a band. Upon his death, Rolling Stone described him as "one of rock's most ambitious and dazzling lyricists".

== Early life ==
Hunter was born Robert Burns on June 23, 1941, in Arroyo Grande, California, near San Luis Obispo. Hunter's father was an alcoholic and deserted the family when Hunter was seven, according to Grateful Dead chronicler Dennis McNally. Hunter spent the next few years in foster homes before returning to live with his mother. These experiences drove him to seek refuge in books, and he wrote a 50-page fairy tale before he was 11. His mother married again, to Norman Hunter, whose last name Robert took. The elder Hunter was a publisher, who gave Robert lessons in writing. Hunter attended high school in Palo Alto, learning to play several instruments as a teenager. His family moved to Connecticut, where he attended the University of Connecticut. He played trumpet in a band called the Crescents. Hunter left the university after a year, and returned to Palo Alto. He enlisted in the National Guard, and spent six months training, before serving a six-month tour of duty.

Upon his return to Palo Alto, in 1961 he was introduced to Jerry Garcia by Garcia's then-girlfriend, who had previously been in a relationship with Hunter. Garcia was 18 and Hunter 19. The duo began to perform together, spending their time in "what passed for Palo Alto's 1961 bohemian community", including Kepler's Books, a bookstore founded by peace activist Roy Kepler. They formed a short-lived duo called "Bob and Jerry" that debuted at the graduation ceremony of the Quaker Peninsula School on May 5, 1961. According to McNally, the group did not last because of "Hunter's limits as a guitarist and Garcia's ravenous drive to get better," but the two remained friendly. Garcia became involved with bluegrass groups in the area such as the Thunder Mountain Tub Thumpers and the Wildwood Boys; Hunter sometimes played the mandolin with these groups, but was more interested in writing. By 1962, he had written a book, The Silver Snarling Trumpet, described by McNally as a roman à clef. McNally writes that it shows Hunter's "skill at storytelling and his fantastic ear for dialogue". Recordings of folk and bluegrass bands that included Hunter and Garcia were later released on two albums – Folk Time (2016) and Before the Dead (2018).

Let it be known there is a fountain
That was not made by the hands of men

That’s pretty much my favorite line I ever wrote - that’s ever popped into my head...

— Robert Hunter on Ripple

Around 1962, Hunter volunteered for psychedelic chemical experiments at Stanford University, research covertly sponsored by the CIA in its MKULTRA program: other participants included Ken Kesey and Allen Ginsberg. He was paid to take LSD, psilocybin, and mescaline, and then report on his experiences, which were creatively formative for him. After a friend attempted to dissuade him, he said, "It'll be fun! I'll take my typewriter and no telling what'll come out." This incident was the first substantial experience any of the Grateful Dead had with psychedelic drugs, and the creative surge he experienced would prove influential on their collective outlook. Around this time, Hunter was briefly involved with Scientology, and also struggled with addiction to methamphetamine and speed, which drove him to move briefly to Los Angeles and then to New Mexico. Some of his hallucinations later inspired his lyrics, such as those to "China Cat Sunflower".

== Grateful Dead ==
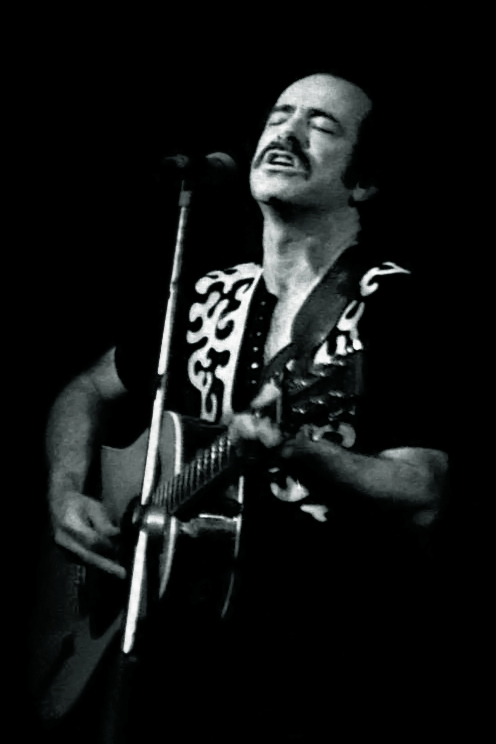
Hunter performing in the early 1980s

While Hunter was in New Mexico, he wrote lyrics for three songs. Later recorded, these songs—"China Cat Sunflower", "St. Stephen", and "Alligator"—would become concert staples for the Grateful Dead. In 1965, Garcia, Ron McKernan, Bob Weir, Phil Lesh and Bill Kreutzmann formed a band, initially called the Warlocks, but soon renamed the Grateful Dead. They covered songs from other artists but soon began to form their own sound. They recorded and released their first album, which included only two original songs, but soon afterward began to develop more of their own, and started work on "Alligator", using Hunter's lyrics. As a result, they invited Hunter to join them in San Francisco to be their lyricist. He joined the Grateful Dead at a concert in Rio Nido, California, where he wrote the lyrics that later became "Dark Star".

Hunter played a minimal role in the Grateful Dead's next album, Anthem of the Sun, but he and Garcia worked together to write every song on Aoxomoxoa, which came after it. Although their musical style was developing, the album produced several popular songs, including "China Cat Sunflower", which became an enduring part of the Grateful Dead's repertoire. A few months before Aoxomoxoa was released, Hunter and his then-partner Christie Bourne began sharing a house with Garcia, his wife, and his step-daughter. Living in close proximity gave additional impetus to their collaborative songwriting. Hunter's relationship with the band grew until he was officially a non-performing band member. The band's reputation also grew; in 1970, a group led by Miles Davis opened a concert for the band.

After Aoxomoxoa, the band shifted from an experimentalist approach toward Americana and country music, featured in their albums American Beauty and Workingman's Dead. This period produced some of their most successful songs, including "Cumberland Blues", "Box of Rain", and "Sugar Magnolia". Many of these pieces were written by Hunter and would go on to become enduring folk songs; according to McNally, pieces such as "Ripple" grew to be "part of the American canon." Hunter reportedly wrote "Brokedown Palace" and "To Lay Me Down" and "Ripple" on one day in 1970 inspired by "a bottle of Retsina and a beautiful London day".

The band's composition methods were varied. Hunter sometimes wrote lyrics the others composed music around; sometimes, he wrote lyrics to music; and sometimes, the group worked together to create music and lyrics simultaneously. Their musical improvisation was often inspired by psychedelic experiences under the influence of LSD, and by other hallucinatory experiences: Hunter wrote "Dire Wolf" inspired by a dream after watching a film adaptation of The Hound of the Baskervilles.

Hunter's participation in the Grateful Dead was dominated by his collaboration with Garcia, based on, according to McNally, "friendship, common experience, Hunter's extraordinary capacity for empathy, and his sterling ability to translate that into lyrics." He also worked with other band members; on Workingman's Dead he worked with McKernan on "Easy Wind", and on American Beauty, with Lesh on "Box of Rain", and Weir on "Sugar Magnolia". He eventually decided he could only work with Garcia, and the duo wrote numerous songs together over the next 25 years. Their relationship was often challenged by Garcia's difficulties with drug addiction; in 2015, Hunter said he was unhappy with the extent of cocaine use among band members in the mid-1970s. Hunter was described as a "proudly irascible" presence in the band, who would often veto attempts to use the band's songs for commercial purposes. This collaboration ended after Garcia's August 1995 death from a heart attack while he was an inpatient at a drug rehabilitation clinic.

== Collaborations ==
Following the dissolution of the Grateful Dead, Hunter successfully continued his writing career, working on new songs with Jim Lauderdale, Elvis Costello, Cesar Rosas, and Bruce Hornsby, among others. He was seen occasionally playing solo acoustic guitar and performing his classic works, as well as newer songs. In 2004 he opened most of the summer tour of the Dead (a group made up of former Grateful Dead members). He also co-wrote, with David Nelson, many of the songs on the New Riders of the Purple Sage albums Where I Come From (2009) and 17 Pine Avenue (2012). Hunter wrote "Cyclone" for Bruce Hornsby and the Noisemakers' Levitate album, released in 2009. Asked in a 2009 interview about some of the song's more "philosophical" lyrics, such as the line "I've got no answers of my own, and none have been provided", Hornsby said, "You know those are Robert Hunter's lyrics with a couple of additions from me." Hornsby commented on his work for Levitate ("Cyclone"), saying, "Well, I've always loved [Robert Hunter's] writing. I've loved so many of the Garcia/Hunter songs. They're just timeless sounding to me, could have been written hundreds of years ago. I had this song that had the same feeling as, say, 'Brokedown Palace'."

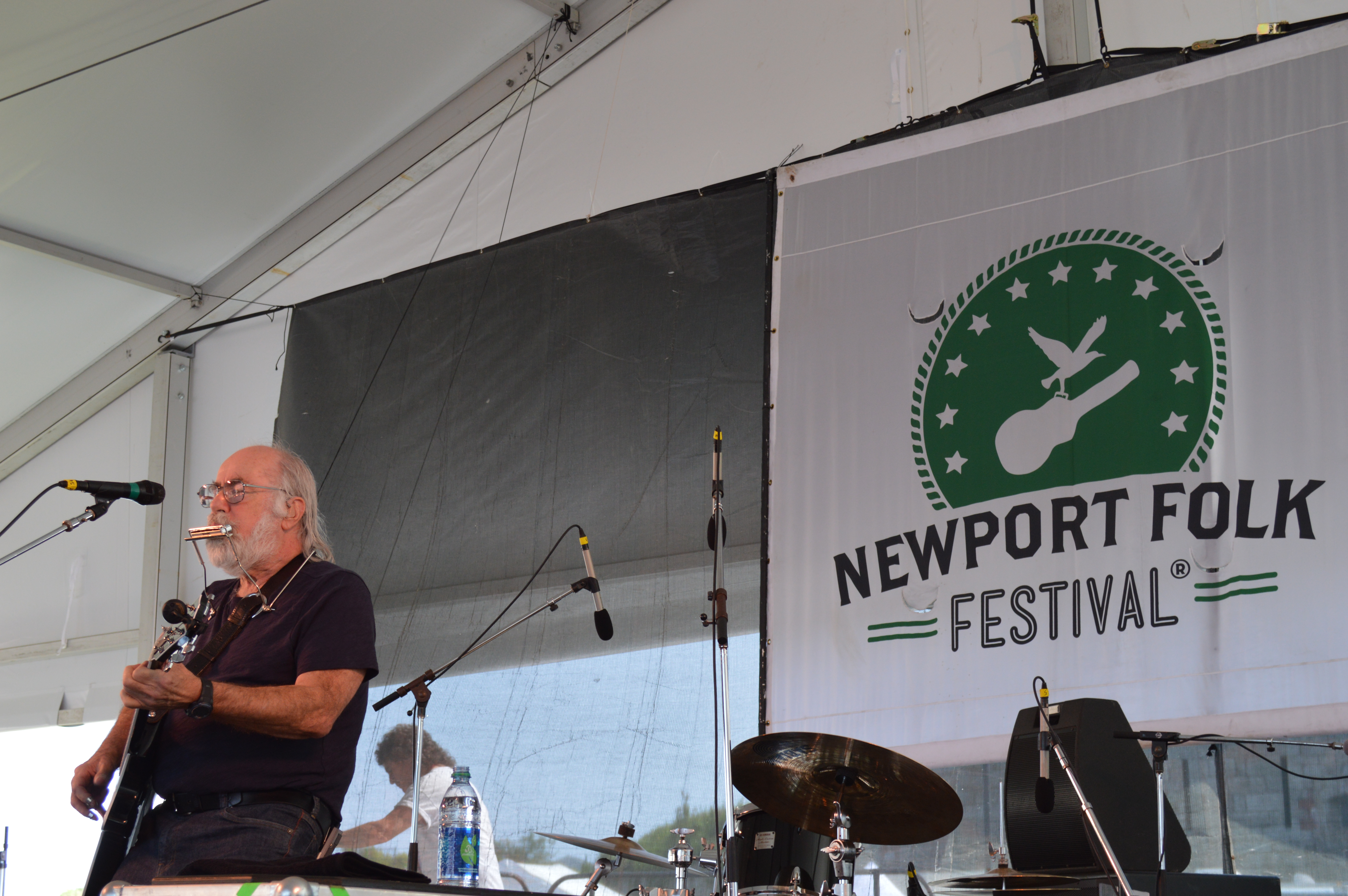
Hunter at the Newport Folk Festival, 2014

Hunter collaborated with Bob Dylan on multiple occasions; he co-wrote two songs on Dylan's 1988 album Down in the Groove, all but one of the songs on Dylan's 2009 album Together Through Life, and "Duquesne Whistle" from Dylan's 2012 album Tempest. "We could probably write a hundred songs together if we thought it was important or the right reasons were there," Dylan said of working with him in 2009. Hunter co-wrote the songs for three Jim Lauderdale albums – Headed For The Hills (2004), Patchwork River (2010) and Carolina Moonrise (2012). Hunter later said that working with Lauderdale was a productive experience, as they both liked working quickly, and wrote an album in a couple of days. Also in 2010 Hunter co-wrote the song "All My Bridges Burning" with Cesar Rosas for the Los Lobos' album Tin Can Trust. In the same year, Hunter wrote lyrics for 7 Walkers' debut album, including "Louisiana Rain", "Chingo", and "Sue From Bogalusa". In 2012, Hunter co-wrote lyrics for the Mickey Hart Band's albums Mysterium Tremendum and the follow-up Superorganism. In an interview with American Songwriter, Hart categorized Hunter's lyrics compared to other great lyricists saying, "When you're in a situation in the future and you can't explain it, very often a Hunter line or two or three will explain something that's unexplainable." Also in 2012, Hunter co-wrote four songs on Little Feat's album Rooster Rag.

== Awards and legacy ==
When the Grateful Dead were inducted into the Rock and Roll Hall of Fame in 1994, Hunter was included as a band member, the only non-performer to ever be so honored. In 2013, Hunter received the Lifetime Achievement Award from the Americana Music Association. He performed "Ripple" from the Grateful Dead's album American Beauty. In 2015, Hunter and Garcia were inducted into the Songwriters Hall of Fame. Hunter accepted the award along with Garcia's daughter, Trixie Garcia, accepting on behalf of her father. Hunter once again performed "Ripple". Hunter said his "pretty much" favorite line he wrote was in "Ripple": Let it be known there is a fountain that was not made by the hands of men. "And I believe it, you know?" he told Rolling Stone in 2015.

According to the New York Times, Hunter's lyrics "helped define the Grateful Dead as a counterculture touchstone". Analyzing his lyrics became a popular exercise among the band's fans, something Hunter took pride in. His approach to songwriting is described as "deeply literary", and responsible for differentiating the music of the Grateful Dead from mainstream popular music. The Los Angeles Times compared his lyrical aesthetic to that of Bob Dylan and Randy Newman, and wrote he was one of the few lyricists who "delved into the unique characteristics of the American psyche". Hunter was the only writer to collaborate extensively with Dylan. During the 2000s, Dylan said Hunter had "a way with words", and "we both write a different type of song than what passes today for songwriting." Hunter was famously averse to explaining his lyrics and avoided interviews, once responding to a question with "If I could explain it in prose, I wouldn't have had to write the song."

Dennis McNally, author of a history of the Grateful Dead, said the band only "developed their potential for greatness" after they made Hunter their main lyricist. McNally writes that while Garcia was one of the "outstanding guitar players and songwriters of his generation", his lyrical abilities were minor. Many of the Grateful Dead's early lyrics were "superficial" and simple. From Hunter and Garcia's collaboration came many of the songs McNally calls the band's masterpieces, including "Ripple", "Brokedown Palace", and "Attics of My Life". According to Rolling Stone, "[considered] one of rock's most ambitious and dazzling lyricists, Hunter was the literary counterpoint to the band's musical experimentation", and his lyrics were "as much a part of the band as Jerry Garcia's singing and guitar."

After his death, his widow, Maureen, discovered a manuscript that details the Grateful Dead's history to Hunter’s first encounter with guitarist Jerry Garcia in Palo Alto in 1961. This manuscript will be published posthumously.

== Personal life and death ==
Hunter married artist Maureen Hunter in 1982, and they had three children. Their initial meeting in London was the inspiration for the song Scarlet Begonias.

One of these children, a son, died in the late 80s. His youngest child was born in 1991. Although an early member of the Church of Scientology, by 1999, Hunter no longer belonged to the organization. In 2013, he was compelled to go on a solo tour as a result of medical bills, after surviving a spinal cord abscess in the previous year.

Hunter died at his home in San Rafael, California on September 23, 2019. He had had recent surgery before his death. Upon hearing news of his demise, tributes and remembrances were shared from his former bandmates Bob Weir, Mickey Hart, Bill Kreutzmann, and Phil Lesh, alongside other musicians Jim Lauderdale, Trey Anastasio, John Mayer, Oteil Burbridge and Warren Haynes.

== Bibliography ==
- The Silver Snarling Trumpet (1962, published 2024)
- Duino Elegies by Rainer Maria Rilke, translator (1987). ISBN 0-938493-04-3
- Sonnets to Orpheus by Rainer Marie Rilke, translator (1993). ISBN 0-938493-21-3
- A Box of Rain (1990). ISBN 978-0-670-83412-9
- Night Cadre (1991). ISBN 0-670-83413-0
- Idiot's Delight (1992). ISBN 0-937815-49-7
- Sentinel (1993). ISBN 0-14-058698-9
- Infinity Minus Eleven: Poems (1993). ISBN 978-1885089113
- Dog Moon (1996). ISBN 1-56389-237-5
- Glass Lunch (1997). ISBN 0-14-058777-2
- The Complete Annotated Grateful Dead Lyrics (2005); foreword by Robert Hunter. ISBN 978-0-7432-7747-1

== Solo discography ==
Albums that Robert Hunter recorded as a solo artist:

- Tales of the Great Rum Runners (1974 – Round Records)
- Tiger Rose (1975 – Round Records)
- Jack O'Roses (1980 – Dark Star Records)
- Promontory Rider: A Retrospective Collection (1982 – Relix Records)
- Amagamalin St. (1984 – Relix Records)
- Live '85 (1985 – Relix Records)
- Flight of the Marie Helena (1985 – Relix Records)
- Rock Columbia (1986 – Relix Records)
- Liberty (1987 – Relix Records)
- Rilke: Duino Elegies (1988 – Hulogosi)
- A Box of Rain (1991 – Rykodisc)
- Sentinel [spoken word] (1993 – Rykodisc)
- Alligator Moon (2026 – Rhino) – recorded with the band Comfort in 1976

== Partial list of compositions ==
- "45th of November"
- "Alligator"
- "Althea"
- "The Ballad of Ronnie Drew"
- "Beyond Here Lies Nothin' "
- "Black Muddy River"
- "Box of Rain"
- "Brokedown Palace"
- "Casey Jones"
- "China Cat Sunflower"
- "China Doll"
- "Dark Star"
- "Days Between"
- "Dire Wolf"
- "Eyes of the World"
- "Franklin's Tower"
- "Friend of the Devil"
- "Greatest Story Ever Told"
- "It Must Have Been the Roses"
- "Jack Straw"
- "Fire on the Mountain"
- "Playing in the Band"
- "Ripple"
- "Rubin and Cherise"
- "Scarlet Begonias"
- "Shakedown Street"
- "Silvio"
- "St. Stephen"
- "Sugaree"
- "Sugar Magnolia"
- "Terrapin Station"
- "Touch of Grey"
- "Truckin' "
- "Uncle John's Band"

== See also ==
- Long Strange Trip, a 2017 documentary about the Grateful Dead
