= Brokedown Palace (song) =

Song by Grateful Dead

from the album American Beauty
- Released: November 1970
- Genre: Gospel; blues
- Length: 4:09
- Label: Warner Bros
- Composer: Jerry Garcia
- Lyricist: Robert Hunter
- Producers: Grateful Dead; Steve Barncard

Official audio
- "Brokedown Palace" on YouTube

"Brokedown Palace" is a song by the American rock band Grateful Dead, released as the seventh track on the band's fifth studio album American Beauty (1970).

== Background ==
Robert Hunter, the band's lyricist wrote the lyrics for "Brokedown Palace" alongside "Ripple" and "To Lay Me Down" in a single afternoon during his first trip to London England in early 1970. As he later recalled: "I sat there with a case of retsina and I opened up a bottle of that stuff", he continued by saying that "for some reason this creative energy started racing through me and I could do no wrong".

== Composition and lyrics ==
The music of "Brokedown Palace" has been described as a "simple, slow gospel-inspired blues melody" by Matthew Greenwald. Lyrically, it takes inspiration from the experiences Hunter had around the time of the album, with a hope for the future.

== Release and reception ==
Although considered for Workingman's Dead, it did not make the final tracklisting. Instead it was included as the second track on the second side of the American Beauty record.

"Brokedown Palace" is seen as a highlight on the album as well as one of the band's best songs and ballads. When ranking the 20 best Grateful Dead songs for Paste magazine, Matt Mitchell placed it at number 18, calling it "sublime and gentle", while noting that "it’s saccharine in a way that the band just never gets hit in the same way ever again." he concludes by saying that he personally prefers the track as a "tender, solemn moment of farewell and of soul’s set adrift."

When ranking every song on American Beauty for Screen Rant, Chris Hedden placed it at number 6, stating that it "latches on to just the right echo of an aching sigh to make the lyrics jump even higher and more profoundly off the page."

In 2020 Rolling Stone placed it at 46 in a ranking of Jerry Garcia's 50 greatest songs, Stating that "Garcia paired Hunter’s lyrics about letting go with a dollop of Southern gospel, heightened by the Dead’s woodsy harmonies" In 2026 Rolling Stone ranked it as 12 / 100 Best Grateful Dead Songs

Writing for Pitchfork Andy Cush called the demo an "uncomfortably intimate window on their process, which hardly anyone needs to hear more than once."

In August 2026, Rolling Stone ranked "Brokedown Palace" as the 12th-best Grateful Dead song of all time.

== Personnel ==
Grateful Dead

- Jerry Garcia – lead vocals, electric guitar
- Bill Kreutzmann – drums
- Bob Weir – rhythm guitar
- Phil Lesh – bass
- Mickey Hart – percussion

Other musicians

- Howard Wales – piano
