= Truckin' =

- German cover

Single by Grateful Dead

from the album American Beauty
- B-side: "Ripple"
- Released: November 1, 1970
- Recorded: September 1970
- Genre: Blues rock; country rock; roots rock; psychedelic rock
- Length: 5:09 (album version); 3:13 (single version)
- Label: Warner Bros.
- Composers: Jerry Garcia; Bob Weir; Phil Lesh
- Lyricist: Robert Hunter
- Producers: Grateful Dead; Steve Barncard

Grateful Dead singles singles chronology
"Uncle John's Band" (1970)	"Truckin'" (1970)	"Johnny B. Goode" (1972)

"Truckin'" is a song by the Grateful Dead, which first appeared on their 1970 album American Beauty. It was recognized by the United States Library of Congress in 1997 as a national treasure. In June 2026, CBS News included the song in its list of the 250 essential American songs of the past 250 years.

== Lyrics ==
"Truckin'" was written by band members Jerry Garcia, Bob Weir, Phil Lesh, and lyricist Robert Hunter. It molds classic Grateful Dead rhythms and instrumentation, and is emblematic of the Grateful Dead sound that earned them four albums in the Rolling Stone 500 greatest albums list, all within the 1968-1970 period.

The lyrics refer to a drug raid of the band's rooms in a New Orleans hotel during a concert tour earlier in 1970:

Busted, down on Bourbon Street
Set up, like a bowling pin
Knocked down, it gets to wearing thin
They just won't let you be

The song's climactic refrain, "What a long, strange trip it's been", has achieved widespread cultural use in the years since the song's release.

== Composition ==
"Truckin'" was considered a "catchy shuffle" by the band members, and is associated with the blues and other early 20th-century forms of folk music. Garcia commented that "the early stuff we wrote that we tried to set to music was stiff because it wasn't really meant to be sung ... the result of [lyricist Robert Hunter getting into our touring world], the better he could write ... and the better we could create music around it." The communal, shared-group-experience feel of the song is brought home by the participation of all four of the group's chief songwriters (Garcia, Weir, Lesh, and Hunter), since, in Phil Lesh's words, "we took our experiences on the road and made it poetry," lyrically and musically. He goes on to say that "the last chorus defines the band itself." Weir credited the band's 1967 experience in backing vocalese singer Jon Hendricks for helping Weir to enunciate the tongue-twister lyrics in Truckin's verses.

== Release ==
The single version of "Truckin'" as a B-side to "Johnny B. Goode" from 1972.

The song was taken from the American Beauty album and edited down in length from five to three minutes for release as a single. In addition to being shorter, the single version had some audible differences compared to the album version: it featured sections of lead guitar in places where it's faded down on the album version, a heavy processed effect on Bob Weir's lead vocals in the verses, a different vocal track for the "Sometimes the lights..." portion, and is missing the album version's organ part.

The single reached number 64 on December 25, 1971, on the U.S. Pop Singles chart and stayed on the chart for eight weeks. "Truckin'" was the highest-charting pop single the group would have until the surprise top-ten performance of "Touch of Grey" sixteen years later. Moreover, the album track was heavily played on progressive rock and album oriented rock radio stations and accordingly helped popularize the group among general rock audiences.

== Live performances ==
"Truckin'" debuted as the first song on the first set on August 18, 1970, at the Fillmore West in San Francisco, the same performance where many of American Beauty's songs premiered.

A longer rendition, that turns into a jam, was included on the popular 1972 live album Europe '72, segueing into "Epilogue", followed by "Prelude".

Over the band's long concert career "Truckin'" was performed 520 times, making it the eighth-most performed Dead song.

== Charts ==
1971–1972 singles charts
Chart	Peak
US Billboard Hot 100	64
US Cash Box Top 100	64
US Record World Singles Chart	68

== Personnel ==
- Bob Weir – rhythm guitar, lead vocals
- Jerry Garcia – lead guitar, backing vocals
- Phil Lesh – bass, backing vocals
- Bill Kreutzmann – drums
- Mickey Hart – drums
- Howard Wales – organ
