= List of songs recorded by Grateful Dead =

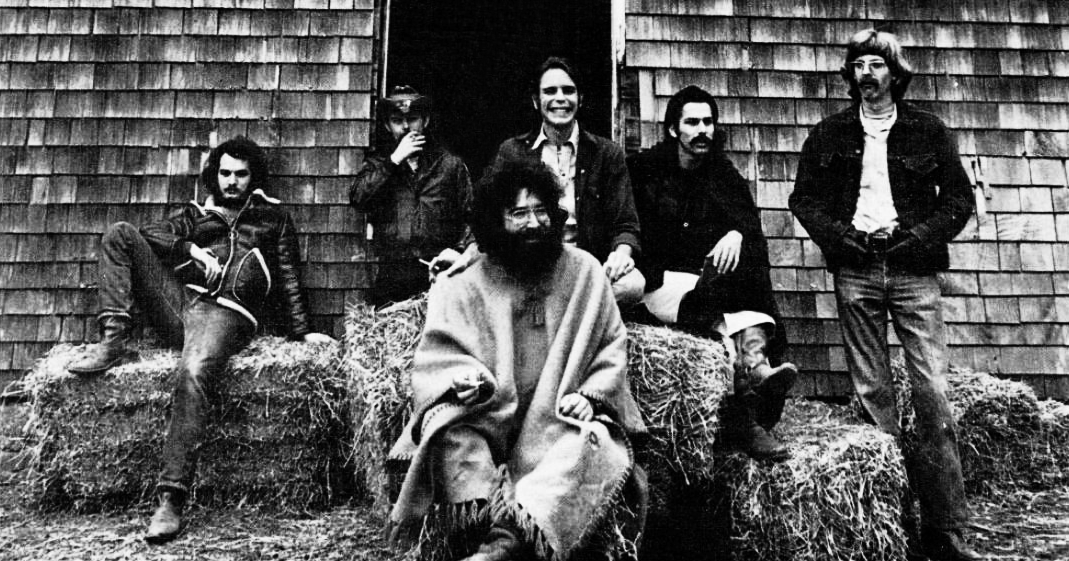
The Grateful Dead in 1970

This is a list of songs recorded by the Grateful Dead, an American rock band active from 1965 to 1995. The table includes each song's title, writer(s), the album or release on which it first appeared, and the year of that release.

Name of song, writer(s), original release, and year of release
Song	Writer(s)	Original release	Year	Ref.
"A to E Flat Jam"	Jerry Garcia; Keith Godchaux; Mickey Hart; Bill Kreutzmann; Phil Lesh; Bob Weir	Blues for Allah (Beyond Description reissue bonus track)	2004	
"Alabama Getaway"	Garcia; Robert Hunter	Go to Heaven	1980	
"Alice D. Millionaire"	Grateful Dead	The Grateful Dead (The Golden Road reissue bonus track)	2001	
"All Along the Watchtower"	Bob Dylan	Dylan & the Dead	1989	
"Alligator"	Lesh; Ron "Pigpen" McKernan; Hunter	Anthem of the Sun	1968	
"Althea"	Garcia; Hunter	Go to Heaven	1980	
"And"	Bob Bralove; Hart; Kreutzmann	Terrapin Station (Limited Edition)	1997	
"Antwerp's Placebo (The Plumber)"	Hart; Kreutzmann	Go to Heaven	1980	
"Apollo at the Ritz"	Garcia; Hart; Kreutzmann; Lesh; Branford Marsalis; Brent Mydland; Weir	Infrared Roses	1991	
"The Ascent"	Grateful Dead	Terrapin Station (Beyond Description reissue bonus track)	2004	
"Attics of My Life"	Garcia; Hunter	American Beauty	1970	
"Beautiful Jam"	Grateful Dead	So Many Roads (1965–1995)	1999	
"Believe It or Not"	Garcia; Hunter	So Many Roads (1965–1995)	1999	
"Bertha"	Garcia; Hunter	Grateful Dead	1971	
"Bird Song"	Garcia; Hunter	Reckoning	1981	
"Black Muddy River"	Garcia; Hunter	In the Dark	1987	
"Black Peter"	Garcia; Hunter	Workingman's Dead	1970	
"Black-Throated Wind"	Weir; John Perry Barlow	Steal Your Face	1976	
"Blow Away"	Mydland; Barlow	Built to Last	1989	
"Blues for Allah"	Garcia; Hunter	Blues for Allah	1975	
"Born Cross-Eyed"	Weir	Anthem of the Sun	1968	
"Boston Clam Jam"	Grateful Dead	Dick's Picks Volume 17	2000	
"Box of Rain"	Lesh; Hunter	American Beauty	1970	
"Brokedown Palace"	Garcia; Hunter	American Beauty	1970	
"Brown-Eyed Women"	Garcia; Hunter	Europe '72	1972	
"Built to Last"	Garcia; Hunter	Built to Last	1989	
"Can She Type?"	Grateful Dead; Merle Saunders	The Twilight Zone – Volume One (Original Soundtrack Recording)	1998	
"Can't Come Down"	Grateful Dead	So Many Roads (1965–1995)	1999	
"Candyman"	Garcia; Hunter	American Beauty	1970	
"Cardboard Cowboy"	Lesh	30 Trips Around the Sun	2015	
"Casey Jones"	Garcia; Hunter	Workingman's Dead	1970	
"Cassidy"	Weir; Barlow	Reckoning	1981	
"Catfish John"	Bob McDill; Allen Reynolds	Terrapin Station (Beyond Description reissue bonus track)	2004	
"Caution (Do Not Stop on Tracks)"	Grateful Dead	Anthem of the Sun	1968	
"Childhood's End"	Lesh	Enjoying the Ride	2025	
"Children's Zoo"	Grateful Dead; Merle Saunders	The Twilight Zone – Volume One (Original Soundtrack Recording)	1998	
"China Cat Sunflower"	Garcia; Hunter	Aoxomoxoa	1969	
"China Doll"	Garcia; Hunter	From the Mars Hotel	1974	
"Chinatown Shuffle"	McKernan	So Many Roads (1965–1995)	1999	
"Clementine"	Lesh; Hunter	So Many Roads (1965–1995)	1999	
"Cold Rain and Snow"	Obray Ramsey	The Grateful Dead	1967	
"Comes a Time"	Garcia; Hunter	Hundred Year Hall	1995	
"Corrina"	Hart; Weir; Hunter	Road Trips Volume 2 Number 4	2009	
"Cosmic Charlie"	Garcia; Hunter	Aoxomoxoa	1969	
"Crazy Fingers"	Garcia; Hunter	Blues for Allah	1975	
"Cream Puff War"	Garcia	The Grateful Dead	1967	
"Crowd Sculpture"	Bralove	Infrared Roses	1991	
"Cryptical Envelopment"	Garcia	Dick's Picks Volume 8	1997	
"Cumberland Blues"	Garcia; Lesh; Hunter	Workingman's Dead	1970	
"Dancin' in the Streets"	Marvin Gaye; William "Mickey" Stevenson; Ivy Jo Hunter	Terrapin Station	1977	
"Dark Hollow"	Bill Browning	History of the Grateful Dead, Volume One (Bear's Choice)	1973	
"Dark Star"	Garcia; Hunter (Note: Sometimes credited to the entire band)	non-album single	1968	
"Days Between"	Garcia; Hunter	So Many Roads (1965–1995)	1999	
"Deal"	Garcia; Hunter	Dead Set	1981	
"Dear Mr. Fantasy"	Jim Capaldi; Steve Winwood; Chris Wood	Without a Net	1990	
"Death Don't Have No Mercy"	Reverend Gary Davis	Live/Dead	1969	
"Deep Elem Blues"	Traditional	Reckoning	1981	
"Dire Wolf"	Garcia; Hunter	Workingman's Dead	1970	
"Distorto"	Garcia	Blues for Allah (Beyond Description reissue bonus track)	2004	
"Doin' That Rag"	Garcia; Hunter	Aoxomoxoa	1969	
"Don't Ease Me In"	Traditional	Re-recorded version appears on Go to Heaven	1966	
"Don't Need Love"	Mydland	30 Trips Around the Sun	2015	
"Drums" (Note: Sometimes entitled "Rhythm Devils")	Hart; Kreutzmann (Note: Performances during Hart's absence from the band are credited solely to Kreutzmann)	Dead Set	1981	
"Dupree's Diamond Blues"	Garcia; Hunter	Aoxomoxoa	1969	
"Early Mornin' Rain"	Gordon Lightfoot	So Many Roads (1965–1995)	1999	
"Easy Answers"	Hunter; Bralove; Weir; Vince Welnick; Rob Wasserman	Ready or Not	2019	
"Easy to Love You"	Mydland; Barlow	Go to Heaven	1980	
"Easy Wind"	Hunter	Workingman's Dead	1970	
"El Paso"	Marty Robbins	Steal Your Face	1976	
"The Eleven"	Lesh; Hunter	Live/Dead	1969	
"Empty Pages"	McKernan	Dick's Picks Volume 35	2005	
"Epilog"	Grateful Dead	Europe '72	1972	
"Equinox"	Lesh	Terrapin Station (Beyond Description reissue bonus track)	2004	
"Estimated Prophet"	Weir; Barlow	Terrapin Station	1977	
"Eternity"	Weir; Wasserman; Willie Dixon	So Many Roads (1965–1995)	1999	
"Eyes of the World"	Garcia; Hunter	Wake of the Flood	1973	
"Far from Me"	Mydland	Go to Heaven	1980	
"Feedback"	McGannahan Skjellyfetti	Live/Dead	1969	
"Feel Like a Stranger"	Weir; Barlow	Go to Heaven	1980	
"Fire in the City"	Peter Krug	non-album single (Note: Jon Hendricks backed by the Grateful Dead)	1967	
"Fire on the Mountain"	Hart; Hunter	Shakedown Street	1978	
"Foolish Heart"	Garcia; Hunter	Built to Last	1989	
"France"	Hart; Weir; Hunter	Shakedown Street	1978	
"Franklin's Tower"	Garcia; Kreutzmann; Hunter	Blues for Allah	1975	
"Friend of the Devil"	Garcia; John Dawson; Hunter	American Beauty	1970	
"From the Heart of Me"	Donna Godchaux	Shakedown Street	1978	
"Gentlemen Start Your Engines"	Mydland; Barlow	So Many Roads (1965–1995)	1999	
"Goin' Down the Road Feeling Bad"	Traditional	Grateful Dead	1971	
"The Golden Road (To Unlimited Devotion)"	McGannahan Skjellyfetti	The Grateful Dead	1967	
"Good Lovin'"	Rudy Clark; Arthur Resnick	Shakedown Street	1978	
"Good Morning Little Schoolgirl"	Sonny Boy Williamson I	The Grateful Dead	1967	
"Gotta Serve Somebody"	Dylan	Dylan & the Dead	1989	
"Greatest Story Ever Told"	Hart; Weir; Hunter	Dead Set	1981	
"Groove #1"	Garcia; K. Godchaux; Hart; Kreutzmann; Lesh; Weir	Blues for Allah (Beyond Description reissue bonus track)	2004	
"Groove #2"	Garcia; K. Godchaux; Hart; Kreutzmann; Lesh; Weir	Blues for Allah (Beyond Description reissue bonus track)	2004	
"Hard to Handle"	Otis Redding	History of the Grateful Dead, Volume One (Bear's Choice)	1973	
"He's Gone"	Garcia; Hunter	Europe '72	1972	
"Heaven Help the Fool"	Weir; Barlow	Reckoning (Beyond Description reissue bonus track)	2004	
"Hell in a Bucket"	Weir; Mydland; Barlow	In the Dark	1987	
"Help on the Way"	Garcia; Hunter	Blues for Allah	1975	
"Here Comes Sunshine"	Garcia; Hunter	Wake of the Flood	1973	
"High Time"	Garcia; Hunter	Workingman's Dead	1970	
"Hollywood Cantata" (Note: Early version of "The Music Never Stopped")	Weir; Hunter	Blues for Allah (Beyond Description reissue bonus track)	2004	
"I Know You Rider"	Traditional	Europe '72	1972	
"I Need a Miracle"	Weir; Barlow	Shakedown Street	1978	
"I of Newton"	Grateful Dead; Merle Saunders	The Twilight Zone – Volume One (Original Soundtrack Recording)	1998	
"I Want You"	Dylan	Dylan & the Dead	1989	
"I Will Take You Home"	Mydland; Barlow	Built to Last	1989	
"I'm a Hog for You"	Jerry Leiber; Mike Stoller	Grateful Dead (The Golden Road reissue bonus track)	2001	
"I've Been All Around This World"	Traditional	History of the Grateful Dead, Volume One (Bear's Choice)	1973	
"If I Had the World to Give"	Garcia; Hunter	Shakedown Street	1978	
"If the Shoe Fits"	Lesh; Andrew Charles	Unreleased	—	
"Infrared Roses"	Garcia; Lesh; Mydland; Weir; Bralove	Infrared Roses	1991	
"Hurts Me Too"	Unknown	Europe '72	1972	
"It Must Have Been the Roses"	Hunter	Steal Your Face	1976	
"Jack-A-Roe"	Traditional	Reckoning	1981	
"Jack Straw"	Weir; Hunter	Europe '72	1972	
"Jam"	Grateful Dead	Dick's Picks Volume 1	1993	
"Joey"	Dylan	Dylan & the Dead	1989	
"Johnny B. Goode"	Chuck Berry	Grateful Dead	1971	
"Just a Little Light"	Mydland; Barlow	Built to Last	1989	
"Katie Mae"	Lightnin' Hopkins	History of the Grateful Dead, Volume One (Bear's Choice)	1973	
"Keep Your Day Job"	Garcia; Hunter	Dick's Picks Volume 6	1996	
"Kentucky Rye – Part 1"	Grateful Dead; Merle Saunders	The Twilight Zone – Volume One (Original Soundtrack Recording)	1998	
"Kentucky Rye – Part 2"	Grateful Dead; Merle Saunders	The Twilight Zone – Volume One (Original Soundtrack Recording)	1998	
"Kentucky Rye – Part 3"	Grateful Dead; Merle Saunders	The Twilight Zone – Volume One (Original Soundtrack Recording)	1998	
"King Solomon's Marbles"	Lesh	Blues for Allah	1975	
"Knockin' on Heaven's Door"	Dylan	Dylan & the Dead	1989	
"KY Jam"	Grateful Dead	View from the Vault, Volume One	2000	
"Lazy Lightnin'"	Weir; Barlow	Dick's Picks Volume 3	1995	
"Lazy River Road"	Garcia; Hunter	So Many Roads (1965–1995)	1999	
"Let It Grow" (Note: "Let It Grow" is Part II of "Weather Report Suite")	Weir; Barlow	Without a Net	1990	
"Let It Rock"	Berry	From the Mars Hotel (Beyond Description reissue bonus track)	2004	
"Let Me Sing Your Blues Away"	K. Godchaux; Hunter	Wake of the Flood	1973	
"Liberty"	Garcia; Hunter	So Many Roads (1965–1995)	1999	
"Little Nemo in Nightland"	Garcia; Lesh; Weir; Bralove	Infrared Roses	1991	
"Little Red Rooster"	Willie Dixon	Dead Set	1981	
"Little Star" (Note: Also known as "Bob Star")	Weir	Dave's Picks Volume 39	2021	
"Looks Like Rain"	Weir; Barlow	Without a Net	1990	
"Loose Lucy"	Garcia; Hunter	From the Mars Hotel	1974	
"Loser"	Garcia; Hunter	Dead Set	1981	
"Lost Sailor"	Weir; Barlow	Go to Heaven	1980	
"Lunatic Preserve"	Grateful Dead	Dick's Picks Volume 9	1997	
"Magnesium Night Light"	Garcia; Lesh; Mydland; Weir	Infrared Roses	1991	
"The Main Ten"	Weir; Hart; Hunter	Dick's Picks Volume 16	2000	
"Mama Tried"	Merle Haggard	Grateful Dead	1971	
"Mason's Children"	Garcia; Lesh; Weir; Hunter	Dick's Picks Volume 4	1996	
"Maybe You Know"	Mydland	Dave's Picks Volume 39	2021	
"Me and Bobby McGee"	Kris Kristofferson	Grateful Dead	1971	
"Me and My Uncle"	John Phillips	Grateful Dead	1971	
"Mexicali Blues"	Weir; Barlow	Skeletons from the Closet: The Best of Grateful Dead	1974	
"Might as Well"	Garcia; Hunter	Dick's Picks Volume 33	2004	
"Mind Left Body Jam"	Grateful Dead	Dick's Picks Volume 19	2000	
"Mindbender (Confusion's Prince)"	Garcia; Lesh	Birth of the Dead	2001	
"Mission in the Rain"	Garcia; Hunter	Grateful Dead Download Series Volume 4	2005	
"Mississippi Half-Step Uptown Toodeloo"	Garcia; Hunter	Wake of the Flood	1973	
"Mock Turtle Jam"	Grateful Dead	Terrapin Station (Limited Edition)	1997	
"Money Money"	Weir; Barlow	From the Mars Hotel	1974	
"Monkey and the Engineer"	Jesse Fuller	Reckoning	1981	
"Morning Dew"	Bonnie Dobson	The Grateful Dead	1967	
"Mountains of the Moon"	Garcia; Hunter	Aoxomoxoa	1969	
"Mr. Charlie"	McKernan; Hunter	Europe '72	1972	
"The Music Never Stopped"	Weir; Barlow	Blues for Allah	1975	
"My Brother Esau"	Weir; Barlow	B-side to "Touch of Grey"	1987	
"Never Trust a Woman"	Mydland	Dozin' at the Knick	1996	
"New New Minglewood Blues" (Note: Sometimes entitled "New Minglewood Blues" or "All New Minglewood Blues")	Noah Lewis	The Grateful Dead (Note: Re-recorded version appears on Shakedown Street)	1967	
"New Potato Caboose"	Lesh; Robert Petersen	Anthem of the Sun	1968	
"New Speedway Boogie"	Garcia; Hunter	Workingman's Dead	1970	
"No MSG Jam"	Grateful Dead	Dick's Picks Volume 9	1997	
"Not Fade Away"	Charles Hardin; Norman Petty	Grateful Dead	1971	
"Oh Babe It Ain't No Lie"	Elizabeth Cotten	Reckoning	1981	
"Oh Boy!"	Sonny West; Bill Tilghman; Petty	Grateful Dead (The Golden Road reissue bonus track)	2001	
"On the Road Again"	Traditional	Reckoning	1981	
"One More Saturday Night"	Weir	Europe '72	1972	
"Only a Fool"	Mydland	30 Days of Dead 2013	2013	
"Operator"	McKernan	American Beauty	1970	
"Orange Tango Jam"	Grateful Dead	Dick's Picks Volume 20	2001	
"The Other One"	Weir; Kreutzmann	Grateful Dead	1971	
"Overseas Stomp (The Lindy)"	Traditional	Historic Dead	1971	
"Parallelogram"	Hart; Kreutzmann	Infrared Roses	1991	
"Passenger"	Lesh; Peter Monk	Terrapin Station	1977	
"Peggy-O"	Traditional	Dick's Picks Volume 15	1999	
"Phil Solo"	Lesh	Dick's Picks Volume 34	2005	
"Picasso Moon"	Weir; Barlow; Bralove	Built to Last	1989	
"Playing in the Band"	Hart; Weir; Hunter	Grateful Dead	1971	
"Post-Modern Highrise Table Top Stomp"	Grateful Dead; Willie Green III	Infrared Roses	1991	
"Prelude"	Grateful Dead	Europe '72	1972	
"Pride of Cucamonga"	Lesh; Petersen	From the Mars Hotel	1974	
"Promised Land"	Berry	Steal Your Face	1976	
"Proto 18 Proper"	Garcia; K. Godchaux; Hart; Kreutzmann; Lesh; Weir	Blues for Allah (Beyond Description reissue bonus track)	2004	
"Queen Jane Approximately"	Dylan	Dylan & the Dead	1989	
"The Race Is On"	Don Rollins	Reckoning	1981	
"Ramble on Rose"	Garcia; Hunter	Europe '72	1972	
"Revolutionary Hamstrung Blues"	Lesh; Mydland; Petersen	Unreleased	—	
"Ripple"	Garcia; Hunter	American Beauty	1970	
"River of Nine Sorrows"	Hart; Kreutzmann; Bralove	Infrared Roses	1991	
"Riverside Rhapsody"	Grateful Dead	Infrared Roses	1991	
"Rosalie McFall"	Charlie Monroe	Reckoning	1981	
"Rosemary"	Garcia; Hunter	Aoxomoxoa	1969	
"Row Jimmy"	Garcia; Hunter	Wake of the Flood	1973	
"Sage & Spirit"	Weir	Blues for Allah	1975	
"Saint of Circumstance"	Weir; Barlow	Go to Heaven	1980	
"St. Stephen"	Garcia; Lesh; Hunter	Aoxomoxoa	1969	
"Salt Lake City"	Weir; Barlow	30 Trips Around the Sun	2015	
"Samba in the Rain"	Welnick; Hunter	30 Trips Around the Sun	2015	
"Samson & Delilah"	Traditional	Terrapin Station	1977	
"Sand Castles & Glass Camels"	Garcia; K. Godchaux; Hart; Kreutzmann; Lesh; Weir	Blues for Allah	1975	
"Scarlet Begonias"	Garcia; Hunter	From the Mars Hotel	1974	
"Serengetti"	Hart; Kreutzmann	Shakedown Street	1978	
"Shakedown Street"	Garcia; Hunter	Shakedown Street	1978	
"Ship of Fools"	Garcia; Hunter	From the Mars Hotel	1974	
"Silver Apples of the Moon"	Bruce Hornsby; Welnick	Infrared Roses	1991	
"Sitting on Top of the World"	Walter Vinson; Lonnie Chatmon	The Grateful Dead	1967	
"Slipknot!"	Garcia; K. Godchaux; Hart; Kreutzmann; Lesh; Weir	Blues for Allah	1975	
"Slow Train"	Dylan	Dylan & the Dead	1989	
"Smokestack Lightnin'	Chester Burnett	History of the Grateful Dead, Volume One (Bear's Choice)	1973	
"So Many Roads"	Garcia; Hunter	So Many Roads (1965–1995)	1999	
"Space"	Lesh; Mydland; Hart; Kreutzmann (Note: Writing credits change based on band lineup and appearing musicians)	Dead Set	1981	
"Spam Jam"	Grateful Dead	Dick's Picks Volume 7	1997	
"Spanish Jam"	Grateful Dead	Dick's Picks Volume 6	1996	
"Sparrow Hawk Row"	Garcia; Hart; Dan Healy; Kreutzmann; Lesh; Mydland; Weir; Bralove	Infrared Roses	1991	
"Speaking in Swords"	Hart; Kreutzmann; Bralove	Infrared Roses	1991	
"Stagger Lee"	Garcia; Hunter	Shakedown Street	1978	
"Standing on the Corner"	Grateful Dead	Birth of the Dead	2001	
"Standing on the Moon"	Garcia; Hunter	Built to Last	1989	
"Stealin'	Traditional	non-album single	1966	
"Stella Blue"	Garcia; Hunter	Wake of the Flood	1973	
"The Stranger (Two Souls in Communion)"	McKernan	Europe '72 (The Golden Road reissue bonus track)	2001	
"Stronger Than Dirt or Milkin' the Turkey"	Hart; Kreutzmann; Lesh	Blues for Allah	1975	
"Sugar Magnolia"	Weir; Hunter	American Beauty	1970	
"Sugaree"	Garcia; Hunter	Steal Your Face	1976	
"Suite from 'Nightcrawlers'"	Grateful Dead; Merle Saunders	The Twilight Zone – Volume One (Original Soundtrack Recording)	1998	
"Suite from 'The Misfortune Cookie'"	Grateful Dead; Merle Saunders	The Twilight Zone – Volume One (Original Soundtrack Recording)	1998	
"Suite from 'The Shadow Man'"	Grateful Dead; Merle Saunders	The Twilight Zone – Volume One (Original Soundtrack Recording)	1998	
"Sunrise"	D. Godchaux	Terrapin Station	1977	
"Sunshine Daydream"	Weir; Hunter	Dick's Picks Volume 12	1974	
"Supplication"	Weir; Barlow	Dick's Picks Volume 3	1995	
"Take a Step Back"	Grateful Dead	Dick's Picks Volume 34	2005	
"Tastebud"	McKernan	The Grateful Dead (The Golden Road reissue bonus track)	2001	
Tennessee Jed	Garcia; Hunter	Europe '72	1972	
"Terrapin Part 1" (Note: Also known as "Terrapin Station")	Garcia; Hart; Kreutzmann; Hunter	Terrapin Station	1977	
"That's It for the Other One"	Grateful Dead	Anthem of the Sun	1968	
"They Love Each Other"	Garcia; Hunter	Dick's Picks Volume 6	1996	
"Throwing Stones"	Weir; Barlow	In the Dark	1987	
"'Till the Morning Comes"	Garcia; Hunter	American Beauty	1970	
"To Lay Me Down"	Garcia; Hunter	Reckoning	1981	
"Tons of Steel"	Mydland	In the Dark	1987	
"Touch of Grey"	Garcia; Hunter	In the Dark	1987	
"Truckin'	Garcia; Lesh; Weir; Hunter	American Beauty	1970	
"Turn on Your Lovelight"	Joseph Wade Scott; Deadric Malone	Live/Dead	1969	
"The Twilight Zone '85 End Credits"	Grateful Dead; Merle Saunders	The Twilight Zone – Volume One (Original Soundtrack Recording)	1998	
"The Twilight Zone '85 Main Title"	Grateful Dead; Merle Saunders	The Twilight Zone – Volume One (Original Soundtrack Recording)	1998	
"Uncle John's Band"	Garcia; Hunter	Workingman's Dead	1970	
"Unbroken Chain"	Lesh; Petersen	From the Mars Hotel	1974	
"Unusual Occurrences in the Desert"	Garcia; Hunter	Blues for Allah	1975	
"U.S. Blues"	Garcia; Hunter	From the Mars Hotel	1974	
"Victim or the Crime"	Weir; Gerrit Graham	Built to Last	1989	
"Viola Lee Blues"	Lewis	The Grateful Dead	1967	
"Wake Up Little Susie"	Felice Bryant; Boudleaux Bryant	History of the Grateful Dead, Volume One (Bear's Choice)	1973	
"Walkin' Blues"	Robert Johnson	Without a Net	1990	
"Wave That Flag" (Note: Early version of "U.S. Blues")	Garcia; Hunter	From the Mars Hotel (Beyond Description reissue bonus track)	2004	
"Wave to the Wind"	Lesh; Hunter	Unreleased	—	
"Way to Go Home"	Welnick; Hunter; Bralove	So Many Roads (1965–1995)	1999	
"We Bid You Goodnight"	Traditional	Live/Dead	1969	
"We Can Run"	Mydland; Barlow	Built to Last	1989	
"Weather Report Suite"	Weir; Eric Andersen; Barlow	Wake of the Flood	1973	
"West L.A. Fadeaway"	Garcia; Hunter	In the Dark	1987	
"Wharf Rat"	Garcia; Hunter	Grateful Dead	1971	
"What'll You Raise"	Garcia; Hunter	Go to Heaven (Beyond Description reissue bonus track)	1980	
"What's Become of the Baby"	Garcia; Hunter	Aoxomoxoa	1969	
"The Wheel"	Garcia; Kreutzmann; Hunter	Dozin' at the Knick	1996	
"When Push Comes to Shove"	Garcia; Hunter	In the Dark	1987	
"Wood Green Jam"	Grateful Dead	Dick's Picks Volume 7	1997	
"The Yellow Dog Story"	Weir	Europe '72 (The Golden Road reissue bonus track)	2001	
"You Don't Have to Ask"	Grateful Dead	So Many Roads (1965–1995)	1999	
"You Win Again"	Hank Williams	Europe '72	1972	

== See also ==
- List of Grateful Dead cover versions
