= Dick's Picks Volume 14 =

Live album by Grateful Dead
- Released: June 18, 1999
- Recorded: November 30, 1973; December 2, 1973
- Venue: Boston Music Hall
- Genres: Rock, jam
- Length: 279:00
- Label: Grateful Dead

Grateful Dead chronology
Dick's Picks Volume 13 (1999)	Dick's Picks Volume 14 (1999)	Dick's Picks Volume 15 (1999)

Professional ratings
Review scores
Source	Rating
Allmusic	3/5 stars
The Music Box	5/5 stars
Rolling Stone	2/5 stars

Dick's Picks Volume 14 is a three-CD live album by the rock band the Grateful Dead. It was recorded on November 30 and December 2, 1973, at the Boston Music Hall in Boston, Massachusetts. It was released on June 18, 1999.

Volume 14 was the last of the Dick's Picks series to be released during the lifetime of the series' namesake, tape archivist Dick Latvala.

As on Dick's Picks Volume 1, Donna Godchaux does not appear on this recording, as she had taken a break from touring with the band due to pregnancy.

== Enclosure and liner notes ==
Included with the release is a single sheet folded into thirds, yielding a six-page enclosure. The front duplicates the CD's cover and the back contains a photograph of the venue's marquee that weekend, stating that the band played there three nights and the shows were "sol out [sic]". Inside are three pages of liner notes interspersed with black-and-white photographs of each of the band members and a single page listing the contents of and credits for the release.

=== Liner notes ===
The liner notes were written by "Michael J. Sanditen aka Tulsa" and are entitled "Baked in Beantown".

In the notes for the 11/30/73 show, Michael tells of how the band was late and "The curtain opened to an empty stage and a room full of jaws dropping to the floor." After a few hours, once the mic stands were in place, bassist Phil Lesh appeared and apologized to the crowd, saying "You see, we thought we were supposed to be here tomorrow night." Their first song, "Morning Dew", was "more or less a sound check." The author writes that there were "no hard feelings over being late" and it "turned out to be a really cool scene". He finishes this first part of the notes by stating that when the band finished he and his friends left and ventured "out into the snowy rain at 2 am."

In the notes for the 12/02/73 show, Sanditen writes that "the music was seamless" and the "second set had no break in it." He asserts that "from start to finish this was one fine performance with little if any miscues." In the last paragraph, he writes that for the next 23 years he and his friends traveled the country, "from Telluride to Santa Fe and New York to San Francisco," trying to "once more give ourselves the opportunity of reliving our youth".

Tulsa closes his article by writing "We are all linked together by a desire to take a ride like that just one more time."

== Track listing ==
Disc 1

1. "Morning Dew" (Bonnie Dobson, Tim Rose) – 14:29
2. "Mexicali Blues" (Bob Weir, John Perry Barlow) – 3:46
3. "Dire Wolf" (Jerry Garcia, Robert Hunter) – 5:09
4. "Black-Throated Wind" (Weir, Barlow) – 7:01
5. "Don't Ease Me In" (traditional, arranged by Grateful Dead) – 4:44
6. "Big River" (Johnny Cash) – 5:30
7. "They Love Each Other" (Garcia, Hunter) – 6:01
8. "Playing in the Band" (Weir, Mickey Hart, Hunter) – 23:18

Disc 2

1. "Here Comes Sunshine" (Garcia, Hunter) – 11:54
2. "Weather Report Suite" – 14:44 →

- "Prelude" (Weir)
- "Part 1" (Weir, Eric Andersen)
- "Part 2: Let It Grow" (Weir, Barlow)

3. "Dark Star Jam" (Garcia, Bill Kreutzmann, Phil Lesh, Ron McKernan, Weir, Hunter) – 9:18 →
4. "Eyes of the World" (Garcia, Hunter) – 19:26 →
5. "Sugar Magnolia" (Hunter, Weir) – 10:16

Disc 3

1. "Cold Rain and Snow" (traditional) – 7:21
2. "Beat It On Down the Line" (Jesse Fuller) – 3:40
3. "Brown-Eyed Women" (Garcia, Hunter) – 7:48

- "The Merry-Go-Round Broke Down" (Cliff Friend, Dave Franklin)
- "Beer Barrel Polka" (Vašek Zeman, Jaromír Vejvoda, Wladimir Timm, Lew Brown)

4. "Jack Straw" (Hunter, Weir) – 5:21
5. "Ramble On Rose" (Garcia, Hunter) – 8:04
6. "Weather Report Suite" (Anderson, Barlow, Weir) – 15:54

- "Prelude" (Weir)
- "Part 1" (Weir, Andersen)
- "Part 2: Let It Grow" (Weir, Barlow)

7. "Wharf Rat" (Garcia, Hunter) – 10:38 →
8. "Mississippi Half-Step Uptown Toodleloo" (Garcia, Hunter) – 8:03 →

Disc 4

1. "Playing in the Band" (Weir, Hart, Hunter) – 12:09 →
2. "Jam" (Grateful Dead) – 15:39 →
3. "He's Gone" (Garcia, Hunter) – 10:27 →
4. "Truckin' " (Garcia, Lesh, Weir, Hunter) – 13:34 →
5. "Stella Blue" (Garcia, Hunter) – 10:15
6. "Morning Dew" (Dobson, Rose) – 14:31

Recording dates

- November 30, 1973 – Discs 1 and 2
- December 2, 1973 – Discs 3 and 4

== Personnel ==
Grateful Dead:

- Jerry Garcia – lead guitar, vocals
- Keith Godchaux – keyboards
- Bill Kreutzmann – drums
- Phil Lesh – electric bass, vocals
- Bob Weir – rhythm guitar, vocals

Production:

- Bill Candelario – recording
- Dick Latvala – tape archivist
- Jeffrey Norman – CD mastering
- John Cutler – ferromagnetist
- Gecko Graphics – design
- Michael J. Sanditen – photography

== Concert set lists ==
The set lists for the 1973 concerts at Boston Music Hall were:

Friday, November 30:

First set: "Morning Dew" (Note: Included on Dick's Picks Volume 14) · "Mexicali Blues" · "Dire Wolf" · "Beat It On Down the Line" · "Brown-Eyed Women" · "Black-Throated Wind" · "Don't Ease Me In" · "El Paso" · "They Love Each Other" · "Big River" · "Loser" · "Playing in the Band"

Second set: "Bertha" · "Promised Land" · "Row Jimmy" · "Jack Straw" · "Here Comes Sunshine" · "Weather Report Suite" · "Dark Star Jam" · "Eyes of the World" · "Sugar Magnolia"

Saturday, December 1:

First set: "Promised Land" · "Sugaree" · "Mexicali Blues" · "Tennessee Jed" · "Looks Like Rain" · "China Cat Sunflower" · "I Know You Rider" · "Big River" · "Brokedown Palace" · "Weather Report Suite" · "Casey Jones"

Second set: "Around and Around" · "They Love Each Other" · "Me and My Uncle" · "Don't Ease Me In" · "Me and Bobby McGee" · "Mississippi Half-Step Uptown Toodeloo" · "Playing in the Band" · "Uncle John's Band" · "Playing in the Band" · "Row Jimmy" · "Greatest Story Ever Told" · "Not Fade Away" · "Goin' Down the Road Feeling Bad" · "One More Saturday Night"

Sunday, December 2:

First set: "Cold Rain and Snow" · "Beat It On Down the Line" · "Dire Wolf" · "The Race Is On" · "Brown-Eyed Women" · "Jack Straw" · "Ramble On Rose" · "El Paso" · "Row Jimmy" · "Big River" · "Deal" · "Weather Report Suite"

Second set: "Wharf Rat" · "Mississippi Half-Step Uptown Toodeloo" · "Playing in the Band" · "Jam" · "He's Gone" · "Truckin' " · "Stella Blue" · "Sugar Magnolia"

Encore: "Morning Dew"
