= Dick's Picks Volume 7 =

Live album by Grateful Dead
- Released: March 4, 1997
- Recorded: September 9–11, 1974
- Venue: Alexandra Palace
- Genres: Rock, jam, psychedelic rock
- Length: 212:57
- Label: Grateful Dead

Grateful Dead chronology
Selections from the Arista Years (1997)	Dick's Picks Volume 7 (1997)	Fallout from the Phil Zone (1997)

Professional ratings
Review scores
Source	Rating
Allmusic	3/5 stars
The Music Box	5/5 stars
Rolling Stone	4/5 stars

Dick's Picks Volume 7 is a three-CD live album by the rock band the Grateful Dead. It was recorded on September 9, 10, and 11, 1974 at Alexandra Palace in London, England. It was released on March 4, 1997.

== Enclosure ==
Included with the release is a single sheet folded in half, yielding a four-page enclosure. The front duplicates the cover of the CD and the back contains a drawing of a dragon eating its tail against a background of clouds that merge with the clouds on the cover.

The two pages inside contain a wide black-and-white drawing of the venue by Alfred Meeson. Above this drawing, in the clouds, are lists of the contents of and credits for the release.

== Track listing ==
Disc 1
No.	Title	Writer(s)	Recording date	Length
1.	"Scarlet Begonias"	Jerry Garcia, Robert Hunter	September 9, 1974	9:29
2.	"Mexicali Blues"	Bob Weir, John Perry Barlow	September 9, 1974	3:36
3.	"Row Jimmy"	Garcia, Hunter	September 9, 1974	8:21
4.	"Black-Throated Wind"	Weir, Barlow	September 10, 1974	7:20
5.	"Mississippi Half-Step Uptown Toodleloo"	Garcia, Hunter	September 10, 1974	8:48
6.	"Beat It On Down the Line"	Jesse Fuller	September 11, 1974	3:30
7.	"Tennessee Jed"	Garcia, Hunter	September 11, 1974	7:59
8.	"Playing in the Band"	Weir, Mickey Hart, Hunter	September 11, 1974	23:30

Disc 2
No.	Title	Writer(s)	Recording date	Length
1.	"Weather Report Suite"	Weir, Eric Andersen, Barlow	September 10, 1974	18:18
2.	"Stella Blue"	Garcia, Hunter	September 10, 1974	8:32
3.	"Jack Straw"	Weir, Hunter	September 11, 1974	5:19
4.	"Brown-Eyed Women"	Garcia, Hunter	September 11, 1974	5:07
5.	"Big River"	Johnny Cash	September 11, 1974	5:14
6.	"Truckin'"	Garcia, Phil Lesh, Weir, Hunter	September 9, 1974	10:31
7.	"Wood Green Jam"	Grateful Dead	September 9, 1974	5:56
8.	"Wharf Rat"	Garcia, Hunter	September 9, 1974	11:13

Disc 3
No.	Title	Writer(s)	Recording date	Length
1.	"Me and My Uncle"	John Phillips	September 10, 1974	3:30
2.	"Not Fade Away"	Charles Hardin, Norman Petty	September 10, 1974	16:27
3.	"Dark Star""	Garcia, Hart, Bill Kreutzmann, Lesh, Ron McKernan, Weir, Hunter	September 10, 1974	24:08
4.	"Spam Jam"	Grateful Dead	September 10, 1974	7:13
5.	"Morning Dew"	Bonnie Dobson, Tim Rose)	September 10, 1974	13:15
6.	"U.S. Blues"	Garcia, Hunter	September 10, 1974	5:41

== Personnel ==
Grateful Dead

- Jerry Garcia – guitar, vocals
- Bob Weir – guitar, vocals
- Keith Godchaux – keyboards
- Donna Jean Godchaux – vocals
- Phil Lesh – bass, vocals
- Bill Kreutzmann – drums

Production

- Recording: Bill Candelario
- Tape archivist: Dick Latvala
- CD mastering: Jeffrey Norman
- Magnetic scrutinizer: John Cutler
- Design: Gecko Graphics
- Architectural rendering: Alfred Meeson

== Concert set lists ==
The set list for the September 9, 1974 concert was:

Note: Single set due to late start: "Bertha" · "Promised Land" · "It Must Have Been the Roses" · "Jack Straw" · "Scarlet Begonias" (Note: Included on Dick's Picks Volume 7) · "Mexicali Blues" · "Row Jimmy" · "Playing in the Band" · "Deal" · "El Paso" · "Ship of Fools" · "Tennessee Jed" · "Truckin' " · "Jam" · "Wharf Rat" · "Uncle John's Band" · "Johnny B. Goode"

Encore: "U.S. Blues" · "One More Saturday Night"

The set list for the September 10, 1974 concert was:

First set: "Around and Around" · "Mississippi Half-Step Uptown Toodeloo" · "Beat It On Down the Line" · "Peggy-O" · "Tennessee Jed" · "Black-Throated Wind" · "China Cat Sunflower" · "I Know You Rider" · "Loser" · "Black Peter" · "Weather Report Suite" · "Stella Blue"

Interlude: "Seastones"

Second set: "Me and My Uncle" · "Dire Wolf" · "Not Fade Away" · "Ramble On Rose" · "Big River" · "Dark Star" · "Jam" · "Morning Dew" · "Sugar Magnolia"

Encore: "U.S. Blues"

The set list for the September 11, 1974 concert was:

First set: "Scarlet Begonias" · "Mexicali Blues" · "Brown-Eyed Women" · "Beat It On Down the Line" · "Sugaree" · "Jack Straw" · "Row Jimmy" · "Me and Bobby McGee" · "Tennessee Jed" · "Big River" · "It Must Have Been the Roses" · "Playing in the Band

Second set: "Seastones" · "Eyes of the World" · "Space" · "Wharf Rat" · "Space"

Third set: "Around and Around" · "Ship of Fools" · "Goin' Down the Road Feeling Bad" · "Sugar Magnolia"

Encore: "U.S. Blues"
