= Dave's Picks Volume 61 =

Live album by Grateful Dead
- Released: January 29, 2027
- Recorded: May 25, 1974
- Venue: UCSB Campus Stadium
- Label: Rhino

Grateful Dead chronology
Carousel Ballroom, San Francisco, CA, 2/14/68 (2026)	Dave's Picks Volume 61 (2027)

Dave's Picks Volume 61 is an upcoming live album by the American rock band the Grateful Dead. It contains the complete concert recorded on May 25, 1974, at the Campus Stadium at the University of California in Santa Barbara. It is scheduled to be released on January 29, 2027, in a limited edition of 25,000 copies.

== Concert set list ==
According to the following sources:

Set 1

1. "U.S. Blues"
2. "Mexicali Blues"
3. "Deal"
4. "Jack Straw"
5. "Scarlet Begonias"
6. "Beat It On Down the Line"
7. "Brown-Eyed Women"
8. "Me and My Uncle"
9. "Sugaree"
10. "El Paso"
11. "China Cat Sunflower" >
12. "I Know You Rider"
13. "Around and Around"

Set 2

1. "Promised Land"
2. "Ship of Fools"
3. "Big River"
4. "Tennessee Jed"
5. "Truckin'" >
6. "Jam" >
7. "Let It Grow" >
8. "Wharf Rat"
9. "Sugar Magnolia" >
10. "Goin' Down the Road Feeling Bad" >
11. "One More Saturday Night"

Encore

1. "Casey Jones"

== Personnel ==
Grateful Dead

- Jerry Garcia – guitar, vocals
- Bob Weir – guitar, vocals
- Keith Godchaux – keyboards
- Donna Jean Godchaux – vocals
- Phil Lesh – bass, vocals
- Bill Kreutzmann – drums

Production

- Produced for release by David Lemieux
