= Dick's Picks Volume 12 =

Live album by Grateful Dead
- Released: October 15, 1998
- Recorded: June 26 & 28, 1974
- Venues: Providence Civic Center; Boston Garden
- Genres: Roots rock, jam band
- Length: 204:51
- Label: Grateful Dead

Grateful Dead chronology
Dick's Picks Volume 11 (1998)	Dick's Picks Volume 12 (1998)	Dick's Picks Volume 13 (1999)

Professional ratings
Review scores
Source	Rating
All About Jazz	4.5/5 stars
AllMusic	4/5 stars
The Music Box	4.5/5 stars
Rolling Stone	3/5 stars

Dick's Picks Volume 12 is a three-CD live album by the rock band the Grateful Dead. It was recorded on June 26, 1974, at the Providence Civic Center in Providence, Rhode Island and on June 28, 1974 at the Boston Garden in Boston, Massachusetts. The album includes most of the second set of the Providence concert and all of the second set of the Boston concert. It was released on October 15, 1998.

== Enclosure ==
Included with the release is a single sheet folded in half, yielding a four-page enclosure. The front duplicates the cover of the CD and the back contains an oval-shaped photograph, tinted in purple and green, of the sound system. Credited to Mary Ann Mayer, surrounding the photo is a background of clouds that flows seamlessly into the clouds on the cover.

The two pages inside contain a series of black-and-white photographs of the band members on stage. Above this series of photos are lists of the contents of and credits for the release.

== Track listing ==
Disc one

June 26, 1974, Providence Civic Center — second set:

1. "Jam" (Grateful Dead) – 2:29 →
2. "China Cat Sunflower" (Jerry Garcia, Robert Hunter) – 11:24 →
3. "Mind Left Body Jam" (Grateful Dead) – 1:39 →
4. "I Know You Rider" (traditional, arranged by Grateful Dead) – 6:12
5. "Beer Barrel Polka" (Jaromír Vejvoda, Lew Brown, Wladimir Timm, Vašek Zeman) – 1:08
6. "Truckin' " (Garcia, Bob Weir, Phil Lesh, Hunter) – 11:06 →
7. "Other One Jam" (Grateful Dead) – 3:06 →
8. "Spanish Jam" (Grateful Dead) – 15:13 →
9. "Wharf Rat" (Garcia, Hunter) – 9:50 →
10. "Sugar Magnolia" (Weir, Hunter) – 9:52

Disc two

June 26, 1974, Providence Civic Center - encore:

1. "Eyes of the World" (Garcia, Hunter) – 11:41

June 28, 1974, Boston Garden — interlude between sets:

2. "Seastones" (Lesh, Ned Lagin) – 4:52

June 28, 1974, Boston Garden — second set:

3. "Sugar Magnolia" (Weir, Hunter) – 6:12 →
4. "Scarlet Begonias" (Garcia, Hunter) – 9:31
5. "Big River" (Johnny Cash) – 5:43
6. "To Lay Me Down" (Garcia, Hunter) – 8:24
7. "Me and My Uncle" (John Phillips) – 3:17
8. "Row Jimmy" (Garcia, Hunter) – 8:16

Disc three

June 28, 1974, Boston Garden — second set, continued:

1. "Weather Report Suite" – 14:35 →
  - "Prelude" (Weir) – 1:11
  - "Part 1" (Weir, Eric Andersen) – 4:16
  - "Let It Grow" (Weir, John Perry Barlow) – 9:08
2. "Jam" (Grateful Dead) – 27:54 →
3. "U.S. Blues" (Garcia, Hunter) – 9:40
4. "Promised Land" (Chuck Berry) – 3:01 →
5. "Goin' Down the Road Feeling Bad" (traditional, arranged by Grateful Dead) – 8:23 →
6. "Sunshine Daydream" (Weir, Hunter) – 4:45

June 28, 1974, Boston Garden – encore:

7. "Ship of Fools" (Garcia, Hunter) – 6:38

== Personnel ==
Grateful Dead:

- Jerry Garcia – guitar, vocals
- Bob Weir – guitar, vocals
- Keith Godchaux – keyboards
- Donna Jean Godchaux – vocals
- Phil Lesh – bass, vocals
- Bill Kreutzmann – drums

Additional musicians

- Ned Lagin – synthesizer and electronic keyboards on "Seastones"

Production:

- Recording: Bill Candelario
- Tape archivist: Dick Latvala
- CD mastering: Jeffrey Norman
- Ferromagnetist: John Cutler
- Design: Gecko Graphics
- Photography: Jim Anderson, Mary Ann Mayer, Bruce Polonsky

== Concert set lists ==
The set list for the June 26, 1974 concert at the Providence Civic Center was:

First set: "Big River" · "Brown-Eyed Women" · "Beat It On Down the Line" · "Scarlet Begonias" · "Black-Throated Wind" · "Row Jimmy" · "Mexicali Blues" · "Deal" · "The Race Is On" · "Mississippi Half-Step Uptown Toodeloo" · "El Paso" · "Ship of Fools" · "Weather Report Suite" · "It Must Have Been the Roses"

Interlude: "Seastones"

Second set: "U.S. Blues" · "Me and My Uncle" · "Jam" (Note: Included on Dick's Picks Volume 12) · "China Cat Sunflower" · "Mind Left Body Jam" · "I Know You Rider" · "Beer Barrel Polka" · "Truckin' " · "Other One Jam" · "Spanish Jam" · "Wharf Rat" · "Sugar Magnolia"

Encore: "Eyes of the World"

The set list for the June 28, 1974 concert at the Boston Garden was:

First set: "Mississippi Half-Step Uptown Toodeloo" · "It Must Have Been the Roses" · "Jack Straw" · "Beat It On Down the Line" · "Deal" · "Mexicali Blues" · "Tennessee Jed" · "Me and Bobby McGee" · "Loose Lucy" · "El Paso" · "Sugaree" · "Around and Around"

Interlude: "Seastones"

Second set: "Sugar Magnolia" · "Scarlet Begonias" · "Big River" · "To Lay Me Down" · "Me and My Uncle" · "Row Jimmy" · "Weather Report Suite" · "Jam" · "U.S. Blues" · "Promised Land" · "Goin' Down the Road Feeling Bad" · "Sunshine Daydream"

Encore: "Ship of Fools"
