= Dick's Picks Volume 1 =

Live album by Grateful Dead
- Released: October 31, 1993
- Recorded: December 19, 1973
- Genres: Rock, psychedelic rock, jam
- Length: 125:03
- Label: Grateful Dead GDCD4018
- Producer: Kidd Candelario

Grateful Dead chronology
Two from the Vault (1992)	Dick's Picks Volume 1 (1993)	Grayfolded (1994)

Professional ratings
Review scores
Source	Rating
Allmusic	4/5 stars
Rolling Stone	2/5 stars
Entertainment Weekly	A

Dick's Picks Volume 1 is the first album in the Dick's Picks series of live releases by the Grateful Dead. It was recorded on December 19, 1973, at Curtis Hixon Hall in Tampa, Florida, and contains a rare recording of the band playing the blues standard "Nobody's Fault but Mine".

Dick's Picks were created using stereo (two-track) concert recordings. This made possible the release of many more Dead shows that exist in the band's extensive tape vault. The series was named for Grateful Dead tape archivist Dick Latvala.

== Track listing ==
Disc one

1. "Here Comes Sunshine" (Jerry Garcia, Robert Hunter) – 14:13
2. "Big River" (Johnny Cash) – 5:23
3. "Mississippi Half-Step Uptown Toodeloo" (Garcia, Hunter) – 7:29
4. "Weather Report Suite" (Bob Weir, Eric Andersen, John Perry Barlow) - 15:56
5. "Big Railroad Blues" (Noah Lewis) – 4:06
6. "Playing in the Band" (Weir, Mickey Hart, Hunter) – 21:11

Disc two

1. "He's Gone" (Garcia, Hunter) – 10:48 →
2. "Truckin' " (Garcia, Phil Lesh, Weir, Hunter) – 9:18 →
3. "Nobody's Fault but Mine" (Joseph "Blind Willie" Johnson) – 5:53 →
4. "Jam" (Garcia, Keith Godchaux, Bill Kreutzmann, Lesh, Weir) – 8:11 →
5. "The Other One" (Weir, Kreutzmann) – 1:57 →
6. "Jam" (Garcia, Godchaux, Kreutzmann, Lesh, Weir) – 6:12 →
7. "Stella Blue" (Garcia, Hunter) – 8:45
8. "Around and Around" (Chuck Berry) – 5:37

== Personnel ==
Grateful Dead

- Jerry Garcia — lead guitar, vocals
- Keith Godchaux — keyboards
- Bill Kreutzmann — drums
- Phil Lesh — bass, vocals
- Bob Weir — rhythm guitar, vocals

In the CD liner notes, Donna Jean Godchaux is listed in the band lineup and credited as "giving birth"; she had temporarily stopped touring with the band as she was about to have her first son, Zion.

Production

- Kidd Candelario — producer, recording
- Dick Latvala — tape archivist
- Bruce Polonsky — photography
- Gekko Graphics — design

== Concert set list ==
The set list for the December 19, 1973 concert at Curtis Hixon Hall was:

First set: "Promised Land" · "Sugaree" · "Mexicali Blues" · "Dire Wolf" · "Black-Throated Wind" · "Candyman" · "Jack Straw" · "Big Railroad Blues" (Note: Included on Dick's Picks Volume 1) · "Big River" · "Here Comes Sunshine" · "El Paso" · "Ramble On Rose" · "Playing in the Band"

Second set: "Mississippi Half-Step Uptown Toodeloo" · "Me and Bobby McGee" · "Row Jimmy" · "Weather Report Suite" · "He's Gone" · "Truckin' " · "Nobody's Fault but Mine" · "Jam" · "The Other One" · "Jam" · "Stella Blue" · "Around and Around"

Encore: "Casey Jones"
