= Dave's Picks Volume 13 =

Live album by Grateful Dead
- Released: February 1, 2015
- Recorded: February 24, 1974
- Genre: Rock
- Length: 213:30
- Label: Rhino
- Producer: Grateful Dead

Grateful Dead chronology
Houston, Texas 11-18-1972 (2014)	Dave's Picks Volume 13 (2015)	The Best of the Grateful Dead (2015)

Dave's Picks Volume 13 is a three-CD live album by the rock band the Grateful Dead. It contains the complete concert recorded on February 24, 1974, at the Winterland Arena in San Francisco, California. It was produced as a limited edition of 16,500 numbered copies, and was released by Rhino Records on February 1, 2015.

== Critical reception ==
On AllMusic, Fred Thomas wrote, "This date finds the band in fantastic form, using a sound system that predated their famous "wall of sound" amplifier system by just a month, and spinning their cosmic wheels through a spirited first set of rockers... before relaxing into more wide-reaching territory in the second and third sets on extensive jams.... The sound is exceptional... and the vibe is more energetic and bright than usual, resulting in one of the more lively Dave's Picks to focus on the early–'70s era Dead."

== Track listing ==
Disc 1
First set:

1. "U.S. Blues" (Jerry Garcia, Robert Hunter) – 6:22
2. "Mexicali Blues" (Bob Weir, John Barlow) – 3:45
3. "Brown-Eyed Women" (Garcia, Hunter) – 5:26
4. "Beat It On Down the Line" (Jesse Fuller) – 4:04
5. "Candyman" (Garcia, Hunter) – 7:19
6. "Jack Straw" (Weir, Hunter) – 5:07
7. "China Cat Sunflower" → (Garcia, Hunter) – 9:54
8. "I Know You Rider" (traditional, arranged by Grateful Dead) – 6:07
9. "El Paso" (Marty Robbins) – 4:52
10. "Loser" (Garcia, Hunter) – 6:44
11. "Playing in the Band" (Weir, Mickey Hart, Hunter) – 18:27

Disc 2
Second set:

1. "Cumberland Blues" (Garcia, Hunter) – 6:57
2. "It Must Have Been the Roses" (Hunter) – 5:38
3. "Big River" (Johnny Cash) – 5:25
4. "Bertha" (Garcia, Hunter) – 6:40
5. "Weather Report Suite" → – 15:34
  - "Prelude" (Weir)
  - "Part I" (Weir, Eric Andersen)
  - "Part II (Let It Grow)" (Weir, Barlow)
6. "Row Jimmy" (Garcia, Hunter) – 10:03
7. "Ship of Fools" (Garcia, Hunter) – 6:08
8. "Promised Land" (Chuck Berry) – 3:33

Disc 3

1. "Dark Star" → (Garcia, Hart, Bill Kreutzmann, Phil Lesh, Ron McKernan, Weir, Hunter) – 29:08
2. "Morning Dew" (Bonnie Dobson, Tim Rose) – 13:54
3. "Sugar Magnolia" → (Weir, Hunter) – 8:54
4. "Not Fade Away" → (Norman Petty, Charles Hardin) – 4:49
5. "Goin' Down the Road Feeling Bad" → (traditional, arranged by Grateful Dead) – 7:23
6. "Not Fade Away" (Petty, Hardin) – 4:29

Encore:

7. "It's All Over Now, Baby Blue" (Bob Dylan) – 6:32

Note: The transition from "China Cat Sunflower" to "I Know You Rider" on disc 1 contains a version of the "Feelin' Groovy Jam".

== Personnel ==
Grateful Dead

- Jerry Garcia – guitar, vocals
- Donna Jean Godchaux – vocals
- Keith Godchaux – keyboards
- Bill Kreutzmann – drums
- Phil Lesh – bass, vocals
- Bob Weir – guitar, vocals

Production

- Produced by Grateful Dead
- Produced for release by David Lemieux
- CD mastering: Jeffrey Norman
- Recording: Kidd Candelario
- Executive producer: Mark Pinkus
- Associate producers: Doran Tyson, Ivette Ramos
- Art direction, design: Steve Vance
- Illustrations: Micah Nelson
- Photos: Steve Caraway, Richie Pechner
- Tape research: Michael Wesley Johnson
- Archival research: Nicholas Meriwether
- Concert notes: Dick Latvala
