= List of Grateful Dead cover versions =

The Grateful Dead was an American rock band known for their extensive touring and constantly varying set lists, including many cover songs from various musical genres.

Grateful Dead covers
Song	Original Artist
"All Along the Watchtower"	Bob Dylan
"Are You Lonely for Me Baby"	Freddie Scott
"Around and Around"	Chuck Berry
"Baba O'Riley"	The Who
"Bad Moon Rising"	Creedence Clearwater Revival
"Ballad of a Thin Man"	Bob Dylan
"Beat It On Down the Line"	Jesse Fuller
"Big Boss Man"	Jimmy Reed
"Big Boy Pete"	The Olympics
"Big Railroad Blues"	Cannon's Jug Stompers
"Big River"	Johnny Cash
"Blackbird"	The Beatles
"Broken Arrow"	Robbie Robertson
"C.C. Rider"	Ma Rainey
"California Earthquake"	The Seldom Scene
"Dancing in the Street"	Martha & the Vandellas
"Dark Hollow"	Bill Browning
"Day Tripper"	The Beatles
"Dear Mr. Fantasy"	Traffic
"Dear Prudence"	The Beatles
"Death Don't Have No Mercy"	Reverend Gary Davis
"Death Letter Blues"	Son House
"Deep Elm Blues"	Traditional
"Desolation Row"	Bob Dylan
"Devil with a Blue Dress On"	Mitch Ryder
"Don't Ease Me In"	Henry Thomas
"Early Morning Rain"	Gordon Lightfoot
"El Paso"	Marty Robbins
"Gimme Some Lovin'"	Spencer Davis Group
"Gloria"	Van Morrison
"Good Lovin'"	The Young Rascals
"Good Morning Little School Girl"	Sonny Boy Williamson
"Good Times"	Sam Cooke
"Green Green Grass Of Home"	Porter Wagoner
"Goin' Down the Road Feeling Bad"	Henry Whitter
"Hard to Handle"	Otis Redding
"Hey Bo Diddley"	Bo Diddley
"Hey Jude"	The Beatles
"Hey Pocky Way"	The Meters
"Hully Gully"	The Olympics
"(I Can't Get No) Satisfaction"	Rolling Stones
"I Fought the Law"	The Crickets
"I Just Wanna Make Love to You"	Muddy Waters
"I Know It's a Sin"	Jimmy Reed
"I Second That Emotion"	Smokey Robinson & the Miracles
"I'm a Hog for You"	The Coasters
"I'm a King Bee"	Slim Harpo
"Iko Iko"	Sugar Boy and His Cane Cutters
"In the Midnight Hour"	Wilson Pickett
"It Hurts Me Too"	Elmore James
"It Takes a Lot to Laugh, It Takes a Train to Cry"	Bob Dylan
"It's a Man's Man's Man's World"	James Brown
"It's All Over Now"	Bobby Womack
"It's All Over Now, Baby Blue"	Bob Dylan
"It's All Too Much"	The Beatles
"It's Nobody's Fault but Mine"	Blind Willie Johnson
"I Washed My Hands in Muddy Water"	Stonewall Jackson
"Johnny B. Goode"	Chuck Berry
"Just Like Tom Thumb's Blues"	Bob Dylan
"Kansas City"	Leiber and Stoller
"Keep On Growing"	Derek and the Dominos
"Knockin' on Heaven's Door"	Bob Dylan
"La Bamba"	Ritchie Valens
"The Last Time"	Rolling Stones
"Little Red Rooster"	Howlin' Wolf
"Long Black Limousine"	Vern Stovall
"Lucy in the Sky With Diamonds"	The Beatles
"Maggie's Farm"	Bob Dylan
"Man Smart (Woman Smarter)"	King Radio
"Mama Tried"	Merle Haggard
"Me and Bobby McGee"	Kris Kristofferson
"Me and My Uncle"	John Phillips
"Mona (I Need You Baby)"	Bo Diddley
"The Monkey and the Engineer"	Jesse Fuller
"Morning Dew"	Bonnie Dobson
"Mystery Train"	Little Junior Parker
"New Minglewood Blues"	Cannon's Jug Stompers
"New Orleans"	Gary U.S. Bonds
"Next Time You See Me"	Little Junior Parker
"Not Fade Away"	Buddy Holly
"Oh Babe, It Ain't No Lie"	Elizabeth Cotten
"One Kind Favor"	Blind Lemon Jefferson
"Pain In My Heart"	Otis Redding
"Promised Land"	Chuck Berry
"Queen Jane Approximately"	Bob Dylan
"Quinn the Eskimo (The Mighty Quinn)"	Bob Dylan
"The Race Is On"	George Jones
"Rain"	The Beatles
"Revolution"	The Beatles
"Rockin' Pneumonia and the Boogie Woogie Flu"	Huey "Piano" Smith
"The Same Thing"	Muddy Waters
"Samson and Delilah"	Reverend Gary Davis
"She Belongs to Me"	Bob Dylan
"Silver Threads and Golden Needles"	The Springfields
"Sing Me Back Home"	Merle Haggard
"Smokestack Lightning"	Howlin' Wolf
"So What"	Miles Davis
"Stir It Up"	Bob Marley
"Stuck Inside of Mobile with the Memphis Blues Again"	Bob Dylan
"Take Me to the River"	Al Green
"Tangled Up in Blue"	Bob Dylan
"That Would Be Something"	Paul McCartney
"Tomorrow Is Forever"	Dolly Parton
"Tomorrow Never Knows"	The Beatles
"Turn on Your Love Light"	Bobby Bland
"Valley Road"	Bruce Hornsby and the Range
"Viola Lee Blues"	Cannon's Jug Stompers
"Visions of Johanna"	Bob Dylan
"Wake Up Little Susie"	The Everly Brothers
"Walking the Dog"	Rufus Thomas
"Wang Dang Doodle"	Willie Dixon
"The Weight"	The Band
"Werewolves of London"	Warren Zevon
"When I Paint My Masterpiece"	Bob Dylan
"Who Do You Love?"	Bo Diddley
"Why Don't We Do It in the Road?"	The Beatles
"Willie and the Hand Jive"	Johnny Otis
"You Ain't Woman Enough"	Loretta Lynn
"You Don't Love Me"	Bo Diddley
"You Win Again"	Hank Williams

== See also ==
- List of songs recorded by Grateful Dead
