= Dick's Picks Volume 13 =

Live album by Grateful Dead
- Released: March 5, 1999
- Recorded: May 6, 1981
- Venue: Nassau Veterans Memorial Coliseum in Uniondale, New York
- Genres: Rock, jam
- Length: 206:55
- Label: Grateful Dead

Grateful Dead chronology
Dick's Picks Volume 12 (1998)	Dick's Picks Volume 13 (1999)	Dick's Picks Volume 14 (1999)

Professional ratings
Review scores
Source	Rating
Allmusic	4/5 stars
The Music Box	4/5 stars
Rolling Stone	3/5 stars

Dick's Picks Volume 13 is a live album by American rock band the Grateful Dead. It contains the complete show recorded on May 6, 1981, at Nassau Veterans Memorial Coliseum in Uniondale, New York.

Bob Weir dedicated "He's Gone" to Bobby Sands, a member of the Provisional Irish Republican Army (IRA) who died on a hunger strike while imprisoned in HM Prison Maze on May 5, 1981.

== Enclosure ==
Included with the release is a single sheet folded in half, yielding a four-page enclosure. The front duplicates the cover of the CD, and the back is mostly black, with a white stripe across the bottom above a circular grey outline of a skull with the number 13 inside.

Inside the enclosure, the page on the left contains a single black-and-white photograph of the band on stage, taken looking down on them from an elevated position. The page on the right lists the contents of and credits for the release.

== Caveat emptor ==
Each volume of Dick's Picks has its own "caveat emptor" label, advising the listener of the sound quality of the recording. The one for Volume 13 reads:

"This release was digitally remastered directly from the original cassette tapes. It is a snapshot of history, not a modern professional recording, and may therefore exhibit some minor technical anomalies and the unavoidable effects of the ravages of time."

== Track listing ==
Disc one
First set:

1. "Alabama Getaway" (Jerry Garcia, Robert Hunter) – 5:01
2. "Greatest Story Ever Told (Mickey Hart, Hunter, Bob Weir) – 4:25
3. "They Love Each Other" (Garcia, Hunter) – 7:08
4. "Cassidy" (John Barlow, Weir) – 5:17
5. "Jack-A-Roe" (traditional) – 4:55
6. "Little Red Rooster" (Willie Dixon) – 9:32
7. "Dire Wolf" (Garcia, Hunter) – 3:26
8. "Looks Like Rain" (Barlow, Weir) – 9:05
9. "Big Railroad Blues" (Noah Lewis) – 3:54
10. "Let It Grow" (Barlow, Weir) – 10:07
11. "Deal" (Garcia, Hunter) – 7:33

Disc two
Second set:

1. "New Minglewood Blues" (traditional) – 7:15
2. "High Time" (Garcia, Hunter) – 9:48
3. "Lost Sailor" (Barlow, Weir) – 6:14 →
4. "Saint of Circumstance" (Barlow, Weir) – 6:35

Hidden tracks recorded November 1, 1979:

- "Scarlet Begonias" (Garcia, Hunter) – 18:30 →
- "Fire on the Mountain" (Hart, Hunter) – 16:42

Disc three

Second set, continued:

1. "He's Gone" (Garcia, Hunter) – 11:53 →
2. "Caution / Spanish Jam" (Grateful Dead) – 15:24 →
3. "Drums" (Hart, Kreutzmann) – 7:23 →
4. "Jam" (Grateful Dead) – 3:42 →
5. "The Other One" (Grateful Dead) – 6:04 →
6. "Goin' Down the Road Feeling Bad" (traditional) – 5:32 →
7. "Wharf Rat" (Garcia, Hunter) – 9:18 →
8. "Good Lovin' " (Rudy Clark, Arthur Resnick) – 7:45

Encore:

9. "Don't Ease Me In" (traditional) – 3:27

== Personnel ==
Grateful Dead:

- Jerry Garcia – lead guitar, vocals
- Bill Kreutzmann – percussion
- Phil Lesh – bass, vocals
- Bob Weir – guitar, vocals
- Mickey Hart – drums
- Brent Mydland – keyboards, vocals

Production:

- Dick Latvala – tape archivist
- Gecko Graphics – design
- Dan Healy – recording
- Jeffrey Norman – CD mastering
- John Cutler – magnetic scrutinizer
- Jim Anderson – photography
