= Heads: A Biography of Psychedelic America =

2016 non-fiction book by Jesse Jarnow

- Language: English
- Subject: Grateful Dead, Deadheads (Music Fans), Rock music, Hallucinogenic Drugs, LSD, Counterculture
- Published: 2016 (Da Capo Press)
- Publication place: United States
- Pages: 480 pages (1st edition, hardcover)
- ISBN: 978-0-306-82255-1 (1st edition, hardcover)

Heads: A Biography of Psychedelic America is a 2016 non-fiction book by rock journalist Jesse Jarnow. The book describes American psychedelics counterculture in the second half of the twentieth century.

== Background ==
Jarnow is a rock journalist whose writing has been published by Rolling Stone, Pitchfork, Wired, and the Village Voice. He began his career writing about the Grateful Dead for Dupree's Diamond News. Jarnow spent nearly a decade researching Heads: A Biography of Psychedelic America. Some of the book's material was published in earlier articles for magazines like Wired and Relix.

Heads relies heavily on firsthand interviews. Interview subjects include sociologist Rebecca Adams, photographer Jay Blakesberg, musician and journalist David Gans, Karen Horning, journalist Blair Jackson, musician Ned Lagin, Carol Latvala (wife of Dick Latvala), LSD chemist Sarah Matzar, LSD historian Mark McCloud, Grateful Dead publicist Dennis McNally, artist Jim Pollock, taper Doug Oade, Earth and Fire of Erowid, musician Lee Ranaldo, LSD chemist Tim Scully, concert promoter Peter Shapiro, Rhoney Stanley (wife of Owsley Stanley), and many more.

== Synopsis ==
Heads offers an analysis of American psychedelic counterculture and its effects on mainstream American society. Jarnow describes the Grateful Dead and their concerts as a kind of loosely organized infrastructure for American counterculture, detailing how the band and their fans were inextricably linked to LSD distribution from the 1960s through the 1990s.

In addition to the Grateful Dead's longstanding connection LSD chemist and sound engineer Owsley Stanley, Jarnow describes how Grateful Dead concerts served as a meeting point and social network for high level LSD dealers like Karen Horning and chemists like Sarah Matzer and William Leonard Pickard. The book also discusses how the U.S. Drug Enforcement Administration targeted LSD-trafficking Deadheads in the 1980s and 1990s.

The book also examines the influence of LSD and other psychedelics on diverse fields of American culture, especially technology and Silicon Valley. Jarnow describes the psychedelic use of Apple Computer founders Steve Jobs and Steve Wozniak, and how early Internet technology like ARPANET was used for countercultural purposes.

Heads also examines how LSD and the Grateful Dead impacted the art world, influencing the New York graffiti clique Rolling Thunder Writers and artist Keith Haring. Jarnow reports that Keith Haring's first commercially available work was a T-shirt Haring designed to sell in the parking lot of Grateful Dead shows.

Heads also offers a history of the Grateful Dead's fans, known as Deadheads. The book presents biographic information about the band's archivist Dick Latvala, the network of Grateful Dead tape trading, and the history of concert promoter Johnny Dwork and the Hampshire College Grateful Dead Historical Society.

In its attempt to cover a range of central narrative within American counterculture and the hippie scene, the book presents histories of the Bread and Puppet Theater, the American jamband Phish, Wetlands Preserve, John Perry Barlow and the Electronic Freedom Foundation, psychedelic pioneer Terence McKenna, and Humbead's Revised Map of the World.

== Reception ==
Heads: A Biography of Psychedelic America received significant mainstream coverage and generally favorable reviews.

Hua Hsu of The New Yorker described the book as "meticulously researched" and praised Jarnow for his "attempt to complicate and extend the history of psychoactive drugs in this country."

Writing for SFGate, Steve Silberman praised the book for its novel approach to psychedelic counterculture: "rather than giving more screen time to overhyped blowhards such as [Timothy] Leary, Jarnow refreshingly focuses on the overlooked foot-soldiers of the lysergic revolution." Silberman described "most regrettable oversight" as "Jarnow’s failure to explore the Afrofuturist movement and other aspects of non-white psychedelia."

Kirkus Reviews commended book's depth of research: "Jarnow has a bloodhound’s sense of the marrow of an argument and the meat of historic fact." Kirkus questioned some of Jarnow's conclusions about the influence of psychedelic culture, while reiterating the book's writing style and entertaining history: "Though Jarnow is sometimes unduly celebratory and sometimes begs credulity—is the fact that we use emoji on our mobile phones really evidence that the psychedelic revolution carried the day?—his book is a lot of fun to read, and it absorbs its own weight in excess reality."

== See also ==
- Grateful Dead
- Deadhead
- Owsley Stanley
- LSD
