= Ace (Bob Weir album) =

1972 debut studio album by Bob Weir

Studio album by Bob Weir
- Released: May 1, 1972
- Recorded: January–March 1972
- Studio: Wally Heider Studios, San Francisco; mixed at Alembic Studios, San Francisco
- Genre: Rock, country rock, folk rock, psychedelic rock
- Length: 37:45
- Label: Warner Bros., Grateful Dead
- Producer: "Everyone involved"

Bob Weir chronology
Ace (1972)	Kingfish (1976)

Ace is the debut album by Grateful Dead singer and guitarist Bob Weir, released in 1972. Weir's bandmates in the Grateful Dead back him on the album, and all but one of the songs became staples of the band's live shows.

== Recording and release ==
The album's origins were an offer by the Dead's Warner Bros. Records label to have band members cut their own solo records, and it came out the same year as Jerry Garcia's Garcia and Mickey Hart's Rolling Thunder. However, in the case of Ace, Weir's backing band was the Dead itself (minus Ron "Pigpen" McKernan), and all songs except "Walk in the Sunshine" became concert staples of the Dead.

The album is essentially a Grateful Dead recording in everything but name. However, it was the first album in which Weir wrote the music for a majority of the songs. "Mexicali Blues" later appeared on the Grateful Dead album Skeletons from the Closet, and "One More Saturday Night" was first issued as a European single, in the guise of "Grateful Dead with Bobby Ace", to promote the band's then-imminent Europe '72 tour. Likewise, a live version of "Playing in the Band" had been released the previous year on Grateful Dead, having already been added to the band's repertoire. Dead bassist Phil Lesh explained "One by one we sidled into the studio, saying things like 'Bob, I really like that tune – got a bass player for it yet?' or 'Hey Bob, need some keyboards on that ballad?' Drawn in by the new songs, we eventually assembled the whole band (minus Pig, who was still trying to regain his health) at Wally Heider’s [studio] and finished the album in a burst of enthusiasm. Bob’s songwriting had taken a great leap forward".

Versions of "Greatest Story Ever Told" and "Playing in the Band" also appear on percussionist Mickey Hart's Rolling Thunder, as "The Pump Song" and "The Main Ten", respectively, both of which were also sung by Weir. The album initiated Weir's writing partnership with his old schoolmate from Wyoming, John Barlow, as lyricist.

== Critical reception ==
Professional ratings
Review scores
Source	Rating
AllMusic	4.5/5 stars
Christgau's Record Guide	A−
Encyclopedia of Popular Music	4/5 stars
Pitchfork	7.6/10
Rolling Stone	(mostly positive)

Reviewing in Christgau's Record Guide: Rock Albums of the Seventies (1981), Robert Christgau wrote: "Weir can be preachy and screechy, but Robert Hunter's homiletics ('Playing in the Band') make up for John Barlow's post-hippie know-nothingisms ('Walk in the Sunshine'), and 'One More Saturday Night' isn't any less a rockabilly epiphany because it strains Bobby's vocal chords—that just adds a note of authenticity. With Barlow redeeming himself on the elegiac pre-hippie fable 'Cassidy' and Keith Godchaux sounding like a cross between Chick Corea and Little Richard, this is the third in a series that began with Workingman's Dead and American Beauty."

== Track listing ==
Side one
No.	Title	Writer(s)	Length
1.	"Greatest Story Ever Told"	Bob Weir, Mickey Hart, Robert Hunter	3:43
2.	"Black-Throated Wind"	Weir, John Perry Barlow	5:42
3.	"Walk in the Sunshine"	Weir, Barlow	3:05
4.	"Playing in the Band"	Weir, Hart, Hunter	7:38

Side two
No.	Title	Writer(s)	Length
5.	"Looks Like Rain"	Weir, Barlow	6:12
6.	"Mexicali Blues"	Weir, Barlow	3:28
7.	"One More Saturday Night"	Weir	4:31
8.	"Cassidy"	Weir, Barlow	3:41
Total length:			37:45

== Personnel ==
Musicians

- Bob Weir – acoustic and electric guitars, vocals
- Bill Kreutzmann – drums
- Phil Lesh – bass; backing vocals on "Mexicali Blues"
- Jerry Garcia – electric guitar; pedal steel guitar on "Looks Like Rain"
- Keith Godchaux – piano
- Donna Godchaux – backing vocals
- Ed Bogus – String arrangement on "Looks Like Rain"
- Dave Torbert – bass on "Greatest Story Ever Told"
- Special thanks to Luis Gasca, Hadley "Snooky" Flowers, the Space Rangers

Production

- "Produced by everybody involved"
- Recording: Bob and Betty
- Mixing: Jerry Garcia and friends
- Cover art: Kelly/Mouse Studios
- Photography: Ron Rakow (LP), Mary Ann Mayer (CD)
- Mastering: Joe Gastwirt (CD)

== Charts ==
Chart (1972)	Peak position
Canadian RPM 100 Albums	67
US Billboard Top LP's & Tape	68
US Cash Box Top 100 Albums	49
US Record World Album Chart	67
