= Skeletons from the Closet: The Best of Grateful Dead =

- Cover art by John Van Hamersveld

Greatest hits album by Grateful Dead
- Released: February 1974 (LP); October 1988 (CD)
- Recorded: 1967–1972
- Genre: Roots rock; jam rock
- Length: 44:53
- Label: Warner Bros. WS 2764
- Producer: Stephen Barncard; Betty Cantor; David Hassinger; Grateful Dead; Bob Matthews

Grateful Dead chronology
| Wake of the Flood (1973) | Skeletons from the Closet: The Best of Grateful Dead (1974) | From the Mars Hotel (1974) |

Professional ratings
Review scores
| Source | Rating |
|---|---|
| AllMusic | 3.5/5 stars |
| Rolling Stone | Mixed |

Skeletons from the Closet: The Best of Grateful Dead is the first compilation album from rock band the Grateful Dead, released in February 1974. As with other such packages, the album was a way for Warner Bros. Records to capitalize on the Dead's back catalog after the band had left the label. It was followed three years later by a second compilation, What a Long Strange Trip It's Been.

== Content ==
Upon fulfilling their contract with Warner Bros. Records, the Grateful Dead left the label and started their own production and publishing arm for the release of their albums and other projects. After Wake of the Flood was successfully released on the independent Grateful Dead Records, Warner Bros. compiled Skeletons from the Closet as a "best-of" package, with tracks representing six of the band's nine albums on their label (along with a track from Bob Weir's solo album, Ace).

Eight of the tracks are from Dead studio recordings, and two are from live albums. However "Turn On Your Love Light" is an edited version that first appeared on the Warner/Reprise Loss Leaders album The Big Ball, rather than the complete version from Live/Dead. "One More Saturday Night" is a live version from Europe '72. Though "Mexicali Blues" is from Weir's solo album, he is backed by the Grateful Dead. Nothing is presented from Anthem of the Sun, Grateful Dead or Bear's Choice, nor versions from singles.

== Title, cover art & release ==
The album title is a pun, referring both to the idiom and to the fact that these are Grateful Dead tracks from Warner Bros.' "closet" (and skeletons being iconography associated with the band). The artwork for the front and back covers of the album was created by John Van Hamersveld. With no input from the band, it only vaguely represents the imagery associated with the Grateful Dead, and is not in keeping with the tone of previous releases.

The front cover shows a somewhat demonic, red-toned man (with flames reflected in his sunglasses), Botticelli's Venus holding a rose (presumably a reference to American Beauty, the album most-heavily represented), and a smoking skeleton spindling a prescient gold record on its extended middle finger. The stem of the rose touches the record, as a stylus. The back cover depicts three men seated around a diner table playing cards, with a globe trophy in the center. A book of matches bears the ecology symbol. Outside in the background, a flying saucer (from The Day the Earth Stood Still) hovers over a futuristic Dymaxion car whose designer, Buckminster Fuller, sits in the driver's seat. The structure in the distance depicts the Johnson Wax Administration Building, designed by Frank Lloyd Wright. The three men depict Marlon Brando from The Wild One, a portrayal of Jesus in academic dress, and Cesar Romero as The Cisco Kid.

Skeletons from the Closet was certified as a Gold Album in 1980, thereafter becoming the best-selling release by the band. It remains so despite the abrupt mix of styles presented (due to the band's stylistic evolution while signed with Warner Bros.), and despite a paucity of live performances, for which the band was more highly regarded by fans and critics.

The album was first released on CD in 1988.

== Track listing ==
Side one
| No. | Title | Writer(s) | Original Album | Length |
|---|---|---|---|---|
| 1. | "The Golden Road (To Unlimited Devotion)" | Jerry Garcia; Bill Kreutzmann; Phil Lesh; Ron "Pigpen" McKernan; Bob Weir | The Grateful Dead | 2:07 |
| 2. | "Truckin'" | Garcia; Lesh; Weir; Robert Hunter | American Beauty | 5:09 |
| 3. | "Rosemary" | Garcia; Hunter | Aoxomoxoa | 1:58 |
| 4. | "Sugar Magnolia" | Weir; Hunter | American Beauty | 3:15 |
| 5. | "St. Stephen" | Garcia; Lesh; Hunter | Aoxomoxoa | 4:26 |
| 6. | "Uncle John's Band" | Garcia; Hunter | Workingman's Dead | 4:42 |

Side two
| No. | Title | Writer(s) | Original Album | Length |
|---|---|---|---|---|
| 1. | "Casey Jones" | Garcia; Hunter | Workingman's Dead | 4:24 |
| 2. | "Mexicali Blues" | Weir; John Perry Barlow | Ace by Bob Weir | 3:24 |
| 3. | "Turn On Your Love Light" (live, January 26, 1969 at Avalon Ballroom) | Deadric Malone; Joseph Scott | The Big Ball compilation | 6:30 |
| 4. | "One More Saturday Night" (live, May 26, 1972 at Lyceum Theatre, London) | Weir | Europe '72 | 4:45 |
| 5. | "Friend of the Devil" | Garcia; John Dawson; Hunter | American Beauty | 3:20 |

== Personnel ==
Grateful Dead

- Jerry Garcia – lead guitar, vocals; pedal steel guitar on "Sugar Magnolia"
- Bob Weir – rhythm guitar, vocals; lead vocals on "Truckin'", "Sugar Magnolia", "Mexicali Blues"
- Ron "Pigpen" McKernan – organ, harmonica, vocals; lead vocals and conga on "Turn On Your Love Light"
- Phil Lesh – bass guitar, vocals; backup vocals on "Mexicali Blues"
- Bill Kreutzmann – drums, percussion except "Rosemary"
- Mickey Hart – drums, percussion on "Truckin'", "Sugar Magnolia", "St. Stephen", "Uncle John's Band", "Casey Jones", "Turn On Your Love Light", "Friend of the Devil"
- Tom Constanten – keyboards on "Rosemary", "St. Stephen", "Turn On Your Love Light"
- Keith Godchaux – piano on "Mexicali Blues", "One More Saturday Night"
- Donna Jean Godchaux – backing vocals on "One More Saturday Night"

Additional performers

- John "Marmaduke" Dawson, Debbie, Peter Grant, Mouse, David Nelson, Wendy on "Rosemary" and "St. Stephen"
- David Grisman – mandolin on "Friend of the Devil"
- Howard Wales – organ on "Truckin'"
- Snooky Flowers – horns on "Mexicali Blues"
- Luis Gasca – horns on "Mexicali Blues"
- The Space Rangers – horns on "Mexicali Blues"

Technical personnel

- Alembic – engineering, mixing on "Casey Jones" and "Uncle John's Band"
- Stephen Barncard – compilation production; production on "Friend of the Devil", "Sugar Magnolia", and "Truckin'"
- Dick Bogert – engineering on "The Golden Road (To Unlimited Devotion)"
- Betty Cantor – production, engineering on "Casey Jones", "Rosemary", "St. Stephen", "Turn On Your Love Light", and "Uncle John's Band"
- Bob Cassidy – engineering on "The Golden Road (To Unlimited Devotion)"
- Dave Collins – digital remastering assistance; pre-mastering assistance on "Friend of the Devil", "Sugar Magnolia", and "Truckin'"
- Tom Flye – engineering, mixing on "Casey Jones", "Friend of the Devil", "Sugar Magnolia", "Truckin'", and "Uncle John's Band"; mastering supervision on "Friend of the Devil", "Sugar Magnolia", and "Truckin'"
- Joe Gastwirt – remixing, production; pre-mastering assistance on "Friend of the Devil", "Sugar Magnolia", and "Truckin'"
- David Hassinger – compilation production; production on "The Golden Road (To Unlimited Devotion)"
- Dan Healy – consulting engineering on "Rosemary" and "St. Stephen"
- Scott Heard – equipment technician on "Casey Jones" and "Uncle John's Band"
- Robin Hurley – audio production on "Casey Jones", "Friend of the Devil", "Sugar Magnolia", "Truckin'", and "Uncle John's Band"
- Bob Matthews – production, engineering on "Casey Jones", "Rosemary", "St. Stephen", "Turn On Your Love Light", and "Uncle John's Band"
- Andrew McPherson – authoring on "Casey Jones" and "Uncle John's Band"
- David McLees – executive production on "Friend of the Devil", "Sugar Magnolia", and "Truckin'"
- Jeffrey Norman – engineering, mixing on "Casey Jones" and "Uncle John's Band"; engineering on "Friend of the Devil", "Sugar Magnolia", and "Truckin'"
- Fred Ordower – engineering on "Friend of the Devil", "Sugar Magnolia", and "Truckin'"
- Ramrod – equipment technician on "Casey Jones" and "Uncle John's Band"
- Bob Seidemann – art direction
- Rudson Shurtliff – engineering, mixing on "Casey Jones" and "Uncle John's Band"; engineering on "Friend of the Devil", "Sugar Magnolia", and "Truckin'"
- Owsley Stanley – consulting engineering on "Rosemary" and "St. Stephen"
- John Van Hamersveld – artwork
- Ron Wickersham – consulting engineering on "Rosemary" and "St. Stephen"
- Bill Wolf – editing

== Charts ==
Billboard
| Chart | Position |
|---|---|
| Pop Albums | 75 |

== Certifications ==
| Region | Certification | Certified units/sales |
|---|---|---|
| United States (RIAA) | 4× Platinum | 4,000,000^{‡} |
^{‡} Sales+streaming figures based on certification alone.
