= Wake of the Flood =

1973 album by the Grateful Dead

Studio album by Grateful Dead
- Released: October 15, 1973
- Recorded: August 4–15, 1973
- Studios: The Record Plant, Sausalito
- Genres: Jazz-rock; Americana
- Length: 45:34
- Label: Grateful Dead
- Producer: Grateful Dead

Grateful Dead chronology
History of the Grateful Dead, Volume One (Bear's Choice) (1973)	Wake of the Flood (1973)	Skeletons from the Closet: The Best of Grateful Dead (1974)

Singles from Wake of the Flood
- 1. "Let Me Sing Your Blues Away" Released: October 1973; 2. "Eyes of the World" Released: January 1974

Professional ratings
Review scores
Source	Rating
AllMusic	4/5 stars
Christgau's Record Guide	B−
Entertainment Weekly	A−
Rolling Stone	(not rated)
The Rolling Stone Album Guide	3/5 stars

Wake of the Flood is the sixth studio album (and tenth album overall) by the rock band the Grateful Dead. Released on October 15, 1973, it was the first album on the band's own Grateful Dead Records label. Their first studio album in nearly three years, it was also the first without founding member Ron "Pigpen" McKernan, who had recently died. His absence and keyboardist Keith Godchaux's penchants for bebop and modal jazz (rather than McKernan's tendencies toward the blues and rhythm and blues) contributed to the band's musical evolution. Godchaux's wife, vocalist Donna Jean Godchaux, also joined the group and appears on the album.

The release fared better on the pop charts than their previous studio album (1970's American Beauty), reaching No. 18. An expanded version was released in 2004.

== Recording ==
After three live albums in a row, the Grateful Dead wanted to record studio versions of songs written since Keith Godchaux had joined the band. At the time of recording, five of the songs on the album (and part of a 6th) had been in live rotation for up to a year and a half, as arrangements were road-tested and finalized. Referring to this period, bassist Phil Lesh explained, "We'd learned to break in the material at shows (under fire, as it were), rather than try to work it out at rehearsals, or in the studio at tremendous expense."

The new compositions drew on many of the band's influences, blending genres from country folk and R&B to ragtime and jazz rock, the latter being more prominent than previously. As had become routine, Robert Hunter and Jerry Garcia wrote the majority of the songs; Bob Weir contributed the epic "Weather Report Suite" with lyrics by John Perry Barlow. The "Prelude" section of this piece had been developed onstage, but the "Part 1" and "Part 2 (Let it Grow)" debuted after the album's recording. "Let Me Sing Your Blues Away" is the band's only singing-songwriting contribution from Keith Godchaux. It was performed live just six times, in September 1973, between the recording and release of the album.

Describing Godchaux's influence, drummer Bill Kreutzmann characterized the album as "Keith's coming out party." Remarking on the evolution in style, he remembered:

Jerry brought "Row Jimmy" into us one day, and it was really difficult to get a grip on it at first. It has a slow tempo, which makes it seem like it would be easy, but it calls for a slight reggae groove layered over a ballad. Rhythmically, the lengths aren't traditional. They're not just twos and fours. It's deceiving. Basically, you have to play the song in half-time with a double-time bounce on top. It's trickier than it sounds. But once I locked into it, "Row Jimmy" became one of the best songs in our repertoire.

The band chose to record at the recently built Record Plant between August 4–15, 1973. It was in Sausalito, near their San Rafael home base, and had been used by cohorts New Riders of the Purple Sage for their successful album The Adventures of Panama Red (which featured input from Hunter and Donna Godchaux). Staff engineer Tom Flye, assistant engineer Tom Anderson, and Dead soundman Dan Healy recorded and mixed on 24-track, bringing the mixdown to Lacquer Channel in Sausalito for mastering. The initial vinyl runs were pressed by Monarch Record Mfg., in Los Angeles.

== Release ==
The album title comes from the opening stanza of "Here Comes Sunshine":

Wake of the flood, laughing water, '49
Get out the pans, don't just stand there dreaming, get out the way,

a poetic reference to the historic flood in Vanport, Oregon (a site where the Dead would play in 1995). Though lyrically the songs continued Hunter's Americana themes, a thread of Earth, seasons and life cycles connects the material, particularly with Weir and Barlow's culminating suite. This is represented in the album cover artwork, designed by San Francisco counterculture artist and band associate Rick Griffin. It has an Earth tone and simple graphics including a woodcut-derived figure of a harvest-reaping man with a wheat bundle and scythe, and a field crow which was extracted from the card game Rook (and never credited). Reflecting the cycles of nature is an image, hidden in a cloud, of a hooded skull. Griffin said that the artwork was inspired by a quote from Revelation – "And the sea gave up the dead that were in it and death and Hell gave up the dead that were in them, and they were judged, every man according to their works." (Revelation 20:13) He added that the image was designed "to show an alternative to that. I wanted to juxtapose that Scripture with a loving image, an image of loving harvest." (The list of song titles on the back cover is missing from some early pressings.)

After completing their extended contract and extracting themselves from Warner Bros., the Dead were left without a record label for production and distribution of their albums. The decision was made to start an independent label, in order to retain complete control of their recordings and allow for side-projects. Lesh explained, "We already owned our own sound system. Booking and travel were in-house. It seemed as if being our own record company would be worth a try. No one could see a downside." Though pressing their own records was foreseeable, setting up a distribution network to compete with existing channels was formidable and ultimately short-lived. Lesh continued, "How would we distribute the records? [Manager Ron] Rakow's original scam was to sell the records from ice-cream trucks...seriously impractical. In the end, we settled on a more traditional model: the Dead would finance and produce the recordings, and United Artists Records would manufacture and distribute."

"Perhaps the studio vibe was too comfortable – the performances on the record fell far short of the intensity we could bring to the music in live performances. Still, the album, Wake of the Flood, did fairly well commercially."

— Phil Lesh

Two singles were released: "Let Me Sing Your Blues Away (b/w "Here Comes Sunshine"), followed by single edits of "Eyes of the World" (b/w "Weather Report Part I"). Neither charted. The Dead's ex-label responded to the loss of the band by compiling "best-of" and archive albums, beginning with Skeletons from the Closet, just months after the release of Wake of the Flood.

All of the songs but "Let Me Sing Your Blues Away" and the first parts of "Weather Report Suite" remained in setlists throughout the existence of the band (though "Here Comes Sunshine" was absent from 2/23/74 to December 1992). Weir had played the finger-picked "Prelude" for months before attaching it to "Weather Report Suite", ultimately dropping all but the "Let it Grow" section after 1974. Though the album's version is concise, "Eyes of the World" in particular had already become an extended-jam set piece and would remain so.

With the collapse of the band's label in 1976, Wake of the Flood was in and out of print for many years. Exercising an active contract, United Artists made a one-off pressing on their Liberty label in 1979. The album went back into publication when it was released on CD in 1988, again on the Grateful Dead Records imprint. It was remastered and expanded for inclusion in the Beyond Description box set in October 2004. The expanded version was released separately in 2006.

A 50th Anniversary Deluxe Edition of Wake of the Flood, remastered from the original recording, was released on September 29, 2023. The CD version includes two bonus tracks – demo recordings of "Eyes of the World" and "Wake of the Flood" – and a bonus disc recorded live at McGaw Hall in Evanston, Illinois on November 1, 1973. The digital download version, in ALAC or FLAC format, has the same tracks as the two-disc CD. The LP version, on black or colored vinyl or as a picture disc, has the same tracks as the original album.

== Track listing ==
Side one
No.	Title	Writer(s)	Lead vocals	Length
1.	"Mississippi Half-Step Uptown Toodeloo"	Jerry Garcia; Robert Hunter	Garcia	5:42
2.	"Let Me Sing Your Blues Away"	Keith Godchaux; Hunter	K. Godchaux	3:15
3.	"Row Jimmy"	Garcia; Hunter	Garcia	7:11
4.	"Stella Blue"	Garcia; Hunter	Garcia	6:22
Total length:				22:30

Side two
No.	Title	Writer(s)	Lead vocals	Length
1.	"Here Comes Sunshine"	Garcia; Hunter	Garcia	4:37
2.	"Eyes of the World"	Garcia; Hunter	Garcia	5:16
3.	"Weather Report Suite": "Prelude" / "Part I" (5:36); "Part II (Let It Grow)" (7:05)	Bob Weir; Eric Andersen; John Perry Barlow	Weir	12:41
Total length:				22:34

Beyond Description (1973–1989) reissue bonus tracks
No.	Title	Writer(s)	Lead vocals	Length
8.	"Eyes of the World" (live on September 7, 1973 at Nassau Coliseum, Uniondale, NY)	Garcia; Hunter	Garcia	17:02
9.	"Weather Report Suite" (acoustic demo)	Weir; Andersen; Barlow	Weir	12:36
10.	"China Doll" (studio outtake)	Garcia; Hunter	Garcia	4:02
Total length:				78:44

Notes:

- The live version of "Eyes of the World" is an edited version of the performance.
- "China Doll" has a coda of "The Merry-Go-Round Broke Down", written by Cliff Friend and Dave Franklin.

=== 50th Anniversary Edition ===
Bonus tracks
No.	Title	Writer(s)	Lead vocals	Length
8.	"Eyes of the World" (demo)	Garcia; Hunter	Garcia	5:42
9.	"Here Comes Sunshine" (demo)	Garcia; Hunter	Garcia	7:34

Disc two – November 1, 1973, McGaw Hall, Evanston, Illinois
No.	Title	Writer(s)	Lead vocals	Length
1.	"Weather Report Suite"	Weir; Andersen; Barlow	Weir	16:50
2.	"Morning Dew"	Bonnie Dobson; Tim Rose	Garcia	13:22
3.	"Playing in the Band"	Weir; Mickey Hart; Hunter	Weir	14:52
4.	"Uncle John's Band"	Garcia; Hunter	Garcia	11:38
5.	"Playing in the Band"	Weir; Hart; Hunter	Weir	3:31
6.	"Mississippi Half-Step Uptown Toodeloo"	Garcia; Hunter	Garcia	8:04

== Wake of the Flood: The Angel's Share ==
Wake of the Flood: The Angel's Share

Studio album by Grateful Dead
- Released: August 18, 2023
- Recorded: August 6–17, 1973
- Studio: Record Plant (Sausalito)
- Length: 2h 28m
- Labels: Grateful Dead; Rhino

Grateful Dead chronology
Dave's Picks Volume 47 (2023)	Wake of the Flood: The Angel's Share (2023)	Dave's Picks Volume 48 (2023)

On August 18, 2023, a collection of demos and outtakes from the Wake of the Flood recording sessions entitled Wake of the Flood: The Angel's Share was released in streaming and digital download formats. This is the third release in the Angel's Share series, following similar collections pertaining to the sessions for Workingman's Dead and American Beauty.

=== Track listing ===
No.	Title	Recording date	Length
1.	"Mississippi Half-Step Uptown Toodeloo" (take 9, not slated)	August 6	7:35
2.	"Mississippi Half-Step Uptown Toodeloo" (take 10, slated)	August 6	1:23
3.	"Mississippi Half-Step Uptown Toodeloo" (take 11, slated)	August 6	7:43
4.	"Mississippi Half-Step Uptown Toodeloo" (take 16, slated)	August 6	7:45
5.	"Stella Blue" (take 1, not slated)	August 7	1:32
6.	"Stella Blue" (take 2, not slated)	August 7	7:20
7.	"Stella Blue" (take 4, slated)	August 7	0:59
8.	"Stella Blue" (take 5, not slated)	August 7	7:23
9.	"I Am the Rain (Weather Report Suite)" (take 2, slated)	August 7	0:38
10.	"I Am the Rain (Weather Report Suite)" (take 23, slated)	August 7	1:37
11.	"I Am the Rain (Weather Report Suite)" (take 4, slated)	August 7	6:15
12.	"Pistol Shot (China Doll)" (take 1, slated)	August 8	3:56
13.	"Pistol Shot (China Doll)" (take 2, slated)	August 8	4:34
14.	"Pistol Shot (China Doll)" (take 3, slated)	August 8	1:37
15.	"Pistol Shot (China Doll)" (take 4, slated)	August 8	3:52
16.	"Row Jimmy" (take 1, not slated)	August 10	1:49
17.	"Eyes of the World" (run-through, not slated)	August 10	0:40
18.	"Eyes of the World" (take 1, slated)	August 10	1:03
19.	"Eyes of the World" (take 6, not slated)	August 10	6:08
20.	"Eyes of the World" (take 15, not slated)	August 10	0:34
21.	"Eyes of the World" (take 16, not slated)	August 10	6:18
22.	"Let Me Sing Your Blues Away" (take 1, not slated)	August 15	0:53
23.	"Let Me Sing Your Blues Away" (take 2, slated)	August 15	11:03
24.	"Let Me Sing Your Blues Away" (take 3, slated)	August 15	4:29
25.	"Let Me Sing Your Blues Away" (take 4, slated)	August 15	4:36
26.	"Let Me Sing Your Blues Away" (take 13, not slated)	August 15	3:20
27.	"Phil's Song (Unbroken Chain)" (take 1, not slated)	August 16	1:28
28.	"Phil's Song (Unbroken Chain)" (take 2, not slated)	August 16	0:47
29.	"Phil's Song (Unbroken Chain)" (take 3, slated)	August 16	2:02
30.	"Phil's Song (Unbroken Chain)" (take 4, not slated)	August 16	1:36
31.	"Phil's Song (Unbroken Chain)" (take 5, not slated)	August 16	0:31
32.	"Phil's Song (Unbroken Chain)" (take 6, not slated)	August 16	2:35
33.	"Phil's Song (Unbroken Chain)" (take 7, slated)	August 16	2:49
34.	"Phil's Song (Unbroken Chain)" (take 8, slated)	August 16	5:30
35.	"Weather Report Suite" (take 10, not slated)	August 16	2:48
36.	"Weather Report Suite" (take 11, not slated)	August 16	5:39
37.	"Weather Report Suite" (take 16, not slated)	August 16	4:47
38.	"Weather Report Suite" (take 8, slated)	August 17	13:16

== Personnel ==
Grateful Dead

- Jerry Garcia – guitar, pedal steel guitar, vocals
- Donna Jean Godchaux – vocals
- Keith Godchaux – keyboards, vocals
- Bill Kreutzmann – drums
- Phil Lesh – bass guitar
- Bob Weir – guitar, vocals

Additional musicians

- Bill Atwood – trumpet
- Vassar Clements – violin
- Joe Ellis – trumpet
- Martín Fierro – saxophone (alto, tenor)
- Sarah Fulcher – vocals
- Matthew Kelly – harmonica
- Frank Morin – saxophone (tenor)
- Pat O'Hara – trombone
- Doug Sahm – bajo sexto
- Benny Velarde – timbales

Reissue personnel

- Tom Anderson – engineering, liner notes
- James Austin – production
- Hugh Brown – design, art direction
- Reggie Collins – annotation
- Peter Coyote – liner notes
- Jimmy Edwards – associate production
- Sheryl Farber – editorial supervision
- Tom Flye – mixing
- Joe Gastwirt – mastering, production consultancy
- Dan Healy – engineering
- Robin Hurley – associate production
- David Lemieux – production
- Hale Milgrim – associate production
- Scott Pascucci – associate production
- Ed Perlstein – photography
- Bruce Polonsky – photography
- Michael Putland – photography
- Cameron Sears – executive production
- Steve Vance – design, art direction

== Charts ==
Chart (1973–1974)	Peak position
Canadian RPM 100 Albums	30
US Billboard Top LP's & Tape	18
US Cash Box Top 100 Albums	13
US Record World Album Chart	21

Chart (2023)	Peak position
Hungarian Physical Albums (MAHASZ)	7
