= Stella Blue =

Song by Grateful Dead

from the album Wake of the Flood
- Released: October 15, 1973
- Length: 6:22
- Label: Grateful Dead
- Composer: Jerry Garcia
- Lyricist: Robert Hunter
- Producer: Grateful Dead

"Stella Blue" is a song by the American rock band Grateful Dead, released as the fourth track on the band's sixth studio album Wake of the Flood (1973).

== Overview ==
According to Robert Hunter in his book A Box of Rain: Lyrics 1965–1993, he wrote the song's lyrics at the Chelsea Hotel in 1970. It was first performed in June 1972 and was performed regularly through July 1995. David Dodd specified the first performance was on June 17, 1972 at the Hollywood Bowl, while the last performance was at the Riverport Amphitheatre on July 6, 1995. "Stella" is latin for "star" and reportedly has a connection with guitars and guitar players. According to David Dodd, the song seems to "constitute the apex of their joint songwriting partnership", noting that "As seems to be always the case in Hunter’s songs, this one is character-driven, with the narrator portrayed as someone who is down and out, and who may have been so for quite some time.", adding "The narration is ambiguous—it seems to me that the singer is encouraging himself to dust off the strings, after saying that he has stayed in all those cheap hotels.", concluding that "It occurs to me to wonder, is Stella a name many Deadheads have used for their own daughters? It’s a beautiful name—certainly right up there with Cassidy." In an interview with Guitar Player magazine, Jerry Garcia called it a "mood piece", while noting it to be "lovely and unique [in that] it's not like any other song", adding that "when [Robert] Hunter gave me the lyrics, I sat on 'em and sat on 'em. Then we were sitting in Germany; I sat down with an acoustic [guitar] early in the morning, and the song just fell together".

== Release and reception ==
"Stella Blue" was released on Wake of the Flood on October 15, 1973, and was generally well received, with critics such as Lindsay Planer calling it a "hauntingly beautiful ballad", adding that "Right from the opening lines, there is a glimpse into Hunter’s intricate literacy", opining that "Although delicate, the melody is perfectly suited for the Grateful Dead[, while t]he openly arranged instrumental passages allow the band to take advantage their unique ability for real-time spontaneous collaborations." noting that "Rather than becoming an anathema, age and maturity only deified the ballad." Oliver Trager called it a "somber, graceful ballad about time's passage and ravages", adding it to be a "an extremely enigmatic song which has been interpreted as everything from a meditation on lost love to an ode to a guitar". In a ranking of Jerry Garcia's 50 greatest songs for Rolling Stone magazine, the writers placed it at number 12, calling it a "come-down ballad". In a ranking on the 10 best Grateful Dead songs for the Guardian, Chris Hardman placed it at number 8 and wrote that "Even if it is about a model of old blues guitar, it’s still brimming with emotion and sad truth[.]" adding that "Stella[ Blue"] is one of several sad, slow songs that the band used to flow into at the end of a second-set extended jam, just to calm everyone down and put everything into perspective after the chaos."

== Cover versions ==
The American indie rock band Local Natives performed a cover of the song for the 2016 tribute album Day of the Dead. In 2023, the American musician Bob Dylan covered the song throughout the 2023 part of his Rough and Rowdy Ways World Wide Tour.
