= Sugar Magnolia =

- cover art for 2018 reissue

Song by Grateful Dead

from the album American Beauty
- Released: November 1970
- Genre: Country rock
- Length: 3:19
- Label: Warner Bros. Records
- Composers: Bob Weir; Robert Hunter
- Producers: Grateful Dead, Steve Barncard

"Sugar Magnolia" is a song by the Grateful Dead, written by Robert Hunter and Bob Weir. First released on the 1970 album American Beauty, "Sugar Magnolia" made its live debut on June 7, 1970, at the Fillmore West in San Francisco. When performed live, the song was often divided into two different entities: "Sugar Magnolia" proper and the "Sunshine Daydream" coda. The break between the two could be a few beats, a set, or even a few concerts. On one occasion, the week of long-time friend of the band Bill Graham's death, the coda was held off for an entire week.

A single edit of the live performance included on Europe '72 (1972) was the group's third Billboard Top 100 hit, peaking at #91 in 1973.

According to Deadbase X, "Sugar Magnolia" was the Dead's second-most played in concert song of their career, with 596 performances, trailing only "Me and My Uncle".

It has been said that the song was written about Bob Weir's girlfriend, Frankie Weir (née Azzara), who lived with him for many years. The song's line "she don't come and I won't follow" echoes the folk song, "Sourwood Mountain", which includes the line "she won't come and I won't call 'er."

A previously unreleased version of the song was included in Duane Allman's box set Skydog: The Duane Allman Retrospective. Scott Schinder wrote in his liner notes that "He (Duane Allman) also sat with the Grateful Dead on multiple occasions, an association that's represented here by an exhilarating, previously unreleased performance of the Dead's 'Sugar Magnolia', on which Duane memorably trades licks with Jerry Garcia".

In August 2026, Rolling Stone ranked this song as the 15th best Grateful Dead song of all time.

== Appears on ==
- American Beauty (1970)
- Looney Tunes & Merrie Melodies (Warner Bros. sampler) (1970)
- Europe '72 (1972)
- Skeletons from the Closet: The Best of Grateful Dead (1974)
- Dick's Picks Volume 2 (1995)
- Hundred Year Hall (1995)
- Dick's Picks Volume 6 (1996)
- Dick's Picks Volume 10 (1998)
- Dick's Picks Volume 12 (1998)
- Dick's Picks Volume 14 (1999)
- Dick's Picks Volume 20 (2000)
- The Closing of Winterland (2003)
- Dick's Picks Volume 36 (2005)
- Winterland 1973: The Complete Recordings (2008)
- Ladies and Gentlemen... the Grateful Dead (2000)
- Skydog, the Duane Allman Retrospective (2013)
- Sunshine Daydream (2013)
- Houston, Texas 11-18-1972 (2014)
- Dave's Picks Volume 13 (2015)
- Saint of Circumstance (2019)

== Charts ==
1972–1973 singles charts
Chart	Peak
US Billboard Hot 100	91
US Record World Singles Chart	104
