= Wharf Rat (song) =

Song by Grateful Dead

from the album Grateful Dead
- Released: September 24, 1971
- Recorded: April 26, 1971
- Venue: Fillmore East, New York, NY
- Length: 8:31
- Label: Warner Bros.
- Composer: Jerry Garcia
- Lyricist: Robert Hunter
- Producer: Grateful Dead

"Wharf Rat" is a song by the American rock band Grateful Dead, released as the tenth track on the live album Grateful Dead (1971), performed on April 26, 1971 at the Fillmore East in New York City.

== Background and composition ==
"Wharf Rat" is a narrative song based on a suspended chord with contrasting a middle section that calls back to the band's early influences of blues with gospel influences during the song's bridge. The narrator recounts finding an old man "blind and dirty" down by the docks of the city. When the man asks for a dime for a cup of coffee, the narrator replies he has no dime but has the time to hear his story. What follows is a story of the blind man's descent into alcoholism, feeling rejected by society and even "my maker" and ending up in prison, yet still hanging on to the hope of his love, Pearlie. In the middle section, he says he'll get on his feet some day and live the life he should. For this part, the music changes from drone to a hymn. The music resuming the drone but with an increased pace, the narrator reassures the old man that he's sure Pearlie's been true to him, then continues his walk, with "nowhere to go just a-hangin' round". He says he too has a girl who he knows has been true to him, thus drawing a firm parallel between the old man and himself.

The song features Merl Saunders on organ, as well as an uncredited piano which AllMusic writer Matthew Greenwald believes could be Ron "Pigpen" McKernan. Greenwald also notes the second half of the song's bridge could act as a musical suite. Grateful Dead historian Oliver Trager summarized it as "an encounter with a down-on-his-luck street person with a story to tell.", noting that "The narrator of “Wharf Rat,” who has patiently listened to the poignant tale, isn’t as sure but is nonetheless uplifted by West’s hopeful spirit."

== Release and reception ==
In his review of "Wharf Rat" for AllMusic, Matthew Greenwald concludes that "Lyrically, it is one of Robert Hunter's finest works and paints a fabulous portrait of a down and out character who hangs around the San Francisco docks. Evocative, beautiful, and disturbing all at the same time, it is a minor classic." In a list of Jerry Garcia's 50 greatest songs for Rolling Stone, it was placed at number 7 by its writers, calling it a "hard-luck dirge about hanging out by the docks and meeting a blind old boozer who asks you for a dime.", noting that "Although the old man swears he’ll get back on his feet someday, Garcia’s winter-is-coming guitar solo suggested harder times lie ahead — and by the end of the song, the singer realized he has way too much in common with the Rat."

== Live performance history ==
The first performance of "Wharf Rat" was done on February 18, 1971. The performance included on the Grateful Dead live album was done on April 26, 1971, at the FIllmore East in New York City and lasted for a total of 8:31. Wharf Rats are concert-goers that have chosen to live sober that arose around the environment of Deadheads, and the nickname for the groups were taken from the song.
