= Eyes of the World (Grateful Dead song) =

Single by Grateful Dead

from the album Wake of the Flood
- B-side: "Weather Report Part I"
- Released: January 1974
- Genre: Rock; jazz
- Length: 5:16
- Label: Grateful Dead
- Composer: Jerry Garcia
- Lyricist: Robert Hunter
- Producer: Grateful Dead

Grateful Dead singles chronology
"Let Me Sing Your Blues Away" (1973)	"Eyes of the World" (1974)	"U.S. Blues" (1974)

"Eyes of the World" is a song by the American rock band the Grateful Dead, released as the second single from the band's 1973 album Wake of the Flood.

== Background ==
The Dead recorded a demo of "Eyes of the World" in early 1973, with the demo being more laid back than the final version. As lyricist Robert Hunter states: "'Eyes of the World' was quite mystical and, I think, a very right song for the late sixties and early seventies. Looking back on it now, it's kind of dated[.]"

== Composition and lyrics ==
Hunter stated the song was about compassion and viewing things from another person's view. The song is a rock and jazz track that runs for a total of five minutes and sixteen seconds.

== Release and reception ==
"Eyes of the World" was issued as a 7-inch single in January 1974 by Grateful Dead Records, the Dead's own label. The song was well received, with Matt Mitchell placing it at number 5, stating that "Jerry and Robert Hunter deliver such beautiful musings on the wonders of the nature around us.", noting that it "Featur[es] dueling (but complimentary) guitar-playing from Jerry and Bob, I particularly love how Keith and Donna’s harmonies shine so brightly midway through." Lindsay Planer wrote that "The liberated tempo and autonomically catchy tune are seasoned with Jerry Garcia's compact solos which weave between the lines to create a sense of lyrical and melodic unity. Robert Hunter's images are exceedingly pastoral with the final verse delving into the band’s extended and rural family life" Soon after its release, it became a fan favorite and a staple in their live concerts. In 2019, the single was reissued as a part of a series of reissue singles.

In August 2026, Rolling Stone ranked this song as the 8th best Grateful Dead song of all time.

== Personnel ==
According to the Grateful Dead Family Discography:

- Jerry Garcia – lead guitar, vocals
- Bob Weir – guitar, vocals
- Phil Lesh – bass, vocals
- Keith Godchaux – keyboards, vocals
- Donna Jean Godchaux – vocals
- Bill Kreutzmann – drums
