= Dick Latvala =

American music archivist (1943–1999)

Richard Allan Latvala (26 July 1943 – 6 August 1999) was an American tape archivist for the Grateful Dead. He started the CD series Dick's Picks, a series that selects live music from Grateful Dead concerts. The first volume of Dick's Picks was released in 1993. The series continued after Latvala's death in 1999 until 2005, with later volumes being selected by David Lemieux. In 2012, the series inspired a spin-off officially known as Dave's Picks.

== Personal life ==
As a senior studying psychology at San Francisco State University, Dick Latvala wrote a brief autobiography in 1965, apparently in preparation for his first time ingesting LSD. The autobiography details Latvala's basic philosophy and understanding of himself, his growing up, and his relationship with his parents and two sisters. Latvala described how he felt more comfortable having black friends rather than white friends, and became interested in the racial struggles of the United States. According to Steve Silberman, upon Latvala hearing the Grateful Dead in 1965 "it was the first music from white people he heard that approached the power of gospel." Latvala was known for his strong opinions, passionate conversations, and love of the Grateful Dead.

Jesse Jarnow's Heads: A Biography of Psychedelic America details much of Dick's personal and professional life as an adult. Dick grew up in the San Francisco-Bay Area, where he lived until moving to Hilo, Hawaii in 1974. Prior to Hawaii, Dick, his wife Carol, and their son Richie lived at one of Victor Baranco's Morehouse communes. Carol Latvala described Morehouse's philosophy and practices as "a combination of Sexual Freedom League material, [and] things they'd learned from witches, Scientology, and Buddhism."

In Hilo, Dick Latvala worked as a zookeeper. Hawaii is where Latvala began to collect recordings of Grateful Dead concerts, often mailing other tapers marijuana in exchange for tapes. Latvala would exchange long letters with tapers on the mainland and extend an invitation to visit Hawaii, to smoke pot and listen to the Grateful Dead at high volumes. Dick and Carol moved back to California in the early 1980s, and although divorced they remained friends and even next-door neighbors, both working for the Grateful Dead at their Front Street office in San Rafael. While Carol worked in the Dead's ticket office, Dick initially performed menial tasks as well as managing the band's music archives.

Throughout his life, Dick Latvala was an avid consumer of psychoactive substances, "a constant acid consumer, a bong hit taker, a coffee drinker, a cigarette smoker, a drinker." At one point, the Grateful Dead paid for Latvala to enter rehab for alcohol. The autobiography he wrote in 1965 begins "I consider any form of psychotherapy desireable [sic?]. I prefer LSD for a number of reasons."

As Latvala recalled in 1993 to David Gans about his first LSD experience: "A major turning point occurred on June 28, 1965. I took LSD in a research project in 1965 in Menlo Park, in which I actually paid $500 to go through this experience, which was, perhaps, the most powerful single experience I ever went through... something happened that changed me forever."

Beyond his love of the Grateful Dead, Latvala enjoyed gospel music, the musician Henry Kaiser, Fats Domino, Little Richard, Lead Belly, and Robert Johnson.

== Work with the Grateful Dead ==
While living in Hawaii, Latvala became very active in tape trading. In addition to amassing a large collection of live recordings, in the 1970s Latvala began maintaining personal notebooks filled with commentary about particular Grateful Dead shows. As described by Grateful Dead archivist Nicholas Meriwether, Latvala "catalog[ed] his tapes in a series of notebooks, detailing their origin and provenance—who taped it and with what equipment—as well as when, where, what they played. He usually noted especially strong renditions as well as his impressions, which he would often revisit later, critiquing his critiques."

In the early 1980s Latvala began working at the Grateful Dead's Front Street office in San Rafael, where he did various odd jobs. Prior to Latvala's arrival, the band did not actively maintain an archive of their recorded concerts. It was Latvala who convinced the band about the importance of maintaining such an archive. Latvala eventually became the curator of Dick's Picks, a series of commercially released recordings of live Grateful Dead performances. Until Dick's Picks, the Grateful Dead typically released live albums that were specially recorded on multitrack source tapes, then professionally mixed. Dick's Picks however, tapped into the band's vast 2-track audio collection, spanning thousands of hours of concerts.

During the early years of Dick's Picks until Latvala's death, 1993–1999, Latvala routinely posted on chat rooms at the band's web site, www.dead.net, and conversed with fans regarding his opinions of Grateful Dead recordings and what should be released next. Latvala was known for his outspoken and sometimes wild opinions about particular Grateful Dead recordings.

Latvala received a mixed response from the larger Grateful Dead organization. As journalist Steve Silberman recalls, Latvala "was used to people ignoring him or thinking of him as low status in the scene... but I actually thought of him as one of the secret buddhas that protected the music... He was completely aware in Zen fashion that his work was the ultimate gift and the ultimate curse. He had to suffer because the collective ethos of the backstage scene was very bruising and masculine. He was in part a stand-in for all Deadheads, for whom [the band's roadies] had contempt."

Latvala was known for lending friends tapes from the official Grateful Dead vault. Nicholas Meriwether noted how many of tapes in the Grateful Dead Archive are labeled "'Courtesy of Dick Latvala. Do not circulate!'" In Heads: A Biography of Psychedelic America, Jesse Jarnow highlights the ambiguous stance Latvala took about these tapes being re-circulated. While refusing to speak to one friend for two years after learning that he re-circulated tapes, Latvala also "loves the Grateful Dead too much and wants the word of their music to travel into every ear and mind possible." Jarnow even claims that Latvala gave taper and future Dark Star Orchestra guitarist Rob Eaton a "near-complete copy of the vault."

== Death and legacy ==
Dick Latvala died following a heart attack at age 56, on August 6, 1999. David Gans dedicated the August 11, 1999 Grateful Dead Hour to the memory of Dick Latvala.

After his sudden death, the Grateful Dead continued the Dick's Picks series. In memory of Dick's known wishes, the Grateful Dead released Dick's Picks Vols. 15 and 16, 9-3-77 and 11-8-69, respectively, which were two of Dick's favorite and most-discussed candidates for future release in his series. In many Dick's Picks albums, the name "LATVALA" can be seen somewhere in the album artwork, often carefully hidden. This was apparently done to commemorate Latvala after his death. The Dick's Picks series gradually came under the creative direction of David Lemieux. Lemieux now releases live concerts under a spin-off series, Dave's Picks.

Dick Latvala's collection of Grateful Dead material was donated by Dick's wife, Carol, to the Grateful Dead Archive. As described by archivist Nicholas Meriwether "Latvala’s collection is divided into two major sections... his personal collection of tapes, more than 500 seven-inch and ten-inch reels, and his papers, which comprise more than a dozen linear feet of notebooks, correspondence, and other materials."

Noting Latvala's shift from dedicated fan to actual archivist, Nicholas Meriwether highlighted the three major themes reflected by Dick Latvala's story and his collection: the "porous boundary between band and fan in the Grateful Dead phenomenon... how participation in the Dead phenomenon instilled a sense of historicity in fans... Most of all, the collection Latvala built demonstrates that it is impossible to tell the story of the Dead without discussing their fans. Deadheads are not only an inextricable part of the phenomenon, they are a vital part of the Archive. That connection goes to the heart of what Latvala’s collection also says about the phenomenon, for Latvala made the transition from amateur to professional, from fan to insider, eventually earning a living from his passion for the band."

In an obituary published by the Chicago Tribune, Grateful Dead drummer Mickey Hart said his strongest memory of Latvala was the image of him blaring Grateful Dead music at high volumes: "The neighbors would complain, the cops might call, he wouldn't care... In those moments, he was communing with God."
