= Dire Wolf (song) =

Song by Grateful Dead

from the album Workingman's Dead
- Released: June 14, 1970
- Recorded: February 1970
- Genre: Country folk
- Length: 3:14
- Label: Warner Bros.
- Composer: Jerry Garcia
- Lyricist: Robert Hunter
- Producers: Bob Matthews; Betty Cantor; Grateful Dead

"Dire Wolf" is a ballad by the Grateful Dead, released as the third track on their 1970 album Workingman's Dead. The lyrics were written by Robert Hunter after watching a film adaptation of The Hound of the Baskervilles. The music, containing elements of country and folk music, was composed by Jerry Garcia on the same day. The song tells the story of a man who plays cards with a dire wolf on a cold winter's night in "Fennario"; the lyrics have been variously interpreted. The piece became a staple of the Grateful Dead's performances, and was played more than two hundred times between 1969 and 1995.

== Background and composition ==
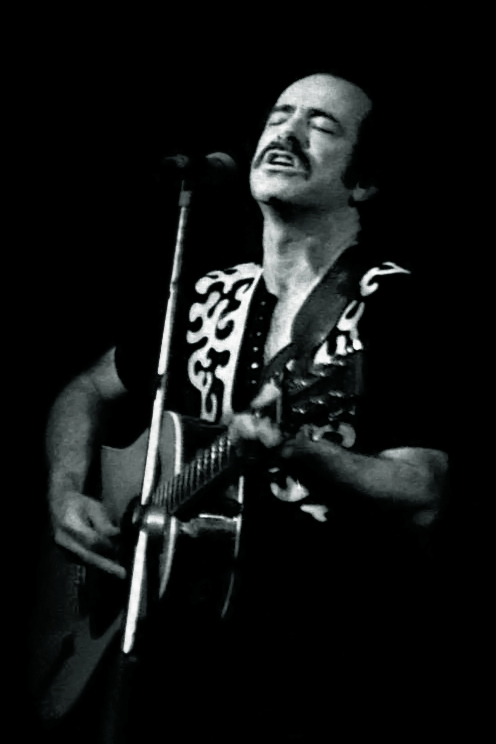
Robert Hunter performing in the early 1980s

A few months before the release of their album Aoxomoxoa in 1969, Grateful Dead lyricist Robert Hunter and his then-partner Christie Bourne began sharing a house with the band's guitarist Jerry Garcia, his wife, and his step-daughter. Living in close proximity gave an impetus to their collaborative song-writing: Hunter and Garcia wrote every song on Aoxomoxoa. Some time later, Hunter and Carolyn Garcia spent an evening watching a film adaptation of The Hound of the Baskervilles. According to Grateful Dead historian Dennis McNally, Carolyn later remarked that the hound was a "dire wolf". However, according to Hunter himself, as quoted in the Annotated Grateful Dead Lyrics, he and Garcia were speculating about the identity of the hound in the story, and came up with the idea that it may have been a dire wolf. Hunter wrote the lyrics the next morning, based on images that the phrase conjured for him, and Garcia wrote the music to them later that day.

== Lyrics and music ==
"Dire Wolf" is a ballad, with influences from country and folk music. Its style was described in an AllMusic review as "impressionistic", and as being similar to the writing of Bob Dylan. It is narrated by a character common to Grateful Dead songs, a "workingman", who is "an underdog without pretense or slick-ness, part of the old gritty America". The narrative is "deceptively simple": the story tells of the man sitting down to dinner on a cold winter's day in "Fennario", after which the listener never sees him again. The narrator says that he wakes in the middle of the night to find a dire wolf outside his window. The wolf is invited in for a game of cards, and despite the frequent refrain "don't murder me", he eventually "collects his due".

The location named "Fennario" appears in the folk song "The Bonnie Lass o' Fyvie", including in the Grateful Dead's version of that song. It refers to a fictional location; a friend of the band members commented in an interview that it was the perfect name for a generic place, because it was evocative, and had four syllables. In contrast, music writer Buzz Poole speculated that the name may be derived from Fenrir, a mythical Nordic wolf who was chained up by the gods. The phrase "don't murder me", repeated in the chorus, was a reference by Garcia to his experiences driving around the San Francisco Bay Area at the time that the Zodiac Killer was active.

The lyrics have been interpreted to suggest that the man's difficulties were self-inflicted, perhaps as the result of a profligate lifestyle. This theme, of whether humans are victims of forces outside of them or creators of their own destinies, is a recurring one in the band's music. Poole comments that the lyrics intentionally hearken back to an earlier period of United States history, and of the "calculated risks of Manifest Destiny". The "red whiskey" referred to American Bourbon, whereas the now-extinct dire wolf was also exclusively from the Americas. According to McNally, the wolf in the lyrics symbolizes the devil, who, in their "postmodern, post-Christian cosmology", they invited in to their homes for a game of cards, and tried to have a good time with.

== Release and performances ==
The studio recording of the song was released as the third piece on the album Workingman's Dead in May 1970. Its first known performance was at San Francisco's California Hall, on June 7, 1969. The song became a staple of the Grateful Dead's live performances; the electric version of the song was typically featured on the band's first set. According to The Grateful Dead's 100 Essential Songs, "Dire Wolf" was played 226 times between 1969 and 1995, and was played every year, except for 1975. Sixty-three of these performances were in the first two years after the song was written. In later years, the acoustic version of the piece became more common. The structure and pace of the song did not change much over the years. It was sung most often by Garcia, although an early version featured Bob Weir on vocals, with Garcia playing the pedal steel guitar instead. An AllMusic review of this version praised Garcia's "sweet" guitar playing as a "great feature" of the song. Its lyrics have led to it being described as an essential Grateful Dead song by commentators.
