= One More Saturday Night (song) =

- cover art for single released by Grateful Dead

Single by Bob Weir

from the album Ace
- B-side: "Bertha"
- Released: May 1972
- Recorded: 1972
- Genre: Rock and roll
- Length: 4:20
- Label: Warner Bros. Records, Grateful Dead Records
- Songwriter: Bob Weir
- Producer: Bob Weir

"One More Saturday Night" is a song written by Bob Weir and performed by the Grateful Dead, of which he was a member. The song had been performed in concert by the Grateful Dead starting in 1971, but it first appeared on record on Weir's debut solo album Ace in 1972. It subsequently appeared on several Grateful Dead live albums.

== Composition ==
Weir is credited with writing "One More Saturday Night", although there is evidence that the song was originally written with Robert Hunter, with different lyrics. Weir wanted to call his version "US Blues", but Hunter did not agree and disavowed himself of the song. Hunter later wrote a song with that title for the Dead's 1974 album From the Mars Hotel.

Although the studio version of "One More Saturday Night" featured on Ace is credited as a Bob Weir solo recording, the song – like the entire album – featured the other members of the Dead acting as Weir's backing group.

== Performances ==
The song was first performed on October 19, 1971, by the Grateful Dead. Aside from Ace, it also appeared on the Dead's Europe '72 live album. After 1972, it became a regular part of the Dead's repertoire, and as might be expected, was frequently heard on Saturday shows; with its short, compact form and energetic crescendoes, it was a popular break from some of the Dead's more challenging pieces. It has continued to be regularly performed by post-Grateful Dead collaboratives, including The Other Ones, Phil Lesh & Friends, The Dead, Furthur, RatDog, Dead & Company, and various solo Weir projects.

U. S. Senator (D-MN), comedian, and political commentator Al Franken, a Grateful Dead fan who used the group's music on his radio show, named his 1986 comedy film One More Saturday Night after the song. Basketball player and Deadhead Bill Walton's 2000s Sirius satellite radio show is named after the song.

== Single release ==
The Ace version song was issued as a single, credited to "The Grateful Dead with Bobby Ace", to promote the band's 1972 European tour. The single did not chart.

== Cover versions ==
- In 2008, Keller Williams released a bluegrass version of the song on the album Rex (Live at the Fillmore).
