= Beat It On Down the Line =

Song performed by the Grateful Dead

"Beat It Down the Line" is a country-blues song written by Jesse Fuller and first recorded in 1961. The lyrics mention "Joe Brown's Coal Mine", which refer to Joseph E. Brown, four times governor of Georgia and president of the Dade Coal Company who ran numerous coal mines in the state.

The song was covered by the Grateful Dead and was one of the first songs the band played live, even being performed in their pre-Dead jug band incarnation as Mother McCree's Uptown Jug Champions in 1964 and appeared on their first album. It remained in the band's sets throughout their career, being performed at least 323 times between 3/12/66 and 10/3/94, every year except 1976 and 1995. The Grateful Dead version featured Bob Weir on lead vocals.
