= Black-Throated Wind =

Song by Bob Weir

from the album Ace
- Released: May 1972
- Recorded: January–March 1972
- Genre: Rock
- Length: 5:42
- Label: Grateful Dead Records
- Composer: Bob Weir
- Lyricist: John Perry Barlow

"Black-Throated Wind" is the second song from Grateful Dead member Bob Weir's solo debut, Ace. The song was written by Weir and lyricist John Perry Barlow about the experiences Barlow had on a road trip from New York City to San Francisco in 1971. Barlow has said that the experience was "right out of Easy Rider", in that he was accosted by locals in the American South for having long hair.

The song was performed by the Grateful Dead frequently in 1972, as heard on the live Europe '72 Volume 2, Steppin' Out with the Grateful Dead: England '72, Dick's Picks Volume 24, and Dick's Picks Volume 30. It also appears twice on Winterland 1973: The Complete Recordings. In addition, as part of the band's set at Winterland in October 1974, it appears on the Grateful Dead's fifth live album, Steal Your Face, released in 1976. The song was dropped from the setlist after 1974, and then was played occasionally after 1990. Featured on 30 Trips Around the Sun September 10, 1991 live from Madison Square Garden.

Upon the above-noted return on March 16, 1990, Weir sang an alternate set of lyrics that drastically changed the arrangement from what had been performed in the early-1970s. The new lyrics were sung by Bobby again on March 26, 1990, when the Dead performed a show at the Knickerbocker Arena in Albany, New York. The new lyrics featured a different vibe ("Oh, I'm drowning in you, You've done better by me than I've done by you" vs. "Oh I'm off and flying with you.. I know I'll only go onward with you"). The song was not played again by the Grateful Dead until September 14, 1990, when they performed at Madison Square Garden in New York City. That performance saw Weir go back to the original 1972 lyrics, with the alternate verses seemingly gone for good, perhaps even forgotten altogether. “If I came up with some new lyrics, I can’t remember what they were,” Weir told Jesse Jarnow on the Good Ol’ Grateful Deadcast podcast. “I’m gonna have to look into that. You’ve piqued my curiosity.” Jarnow also cited a 1989 interview Weir did with Blair Jackson in which Bobby discussed “Black-Throated Wind” prior to debuting the short-lived alternative lyrics. Lamenting that the lyrics needed “some adjusting” Weir revealed: “The character in that particular tale is not somebody I can get behind. It’s always been a poor fit for me. There’s stuff in there I just didn’t want to be singing; that seem like words to fill out a melody rather than something I really cared about, and that finally got in the way.”

The song got a revival, as Dead & Co., who formed in October 2015, put the song in their rotation, and was last played June 17, 2023.
