= Going Down the Road Feeling Bad =

Traditional American folk song

"Going Down The Road Feeling Bad" (also known as the "Lonesome Road Blues") is a traditional American folk song, "a white blues of universal appeal and uncertain origin". The song is catalogued in the Roud Folk Song Index as No.4958.

== Recording history ==
The song was recorded by many artists through the years. The first known recording is from 1923 by Henry Whitter, an Appalachian singer, as "Lonesome Road Blues". The earliest versions of the lyrics are from the perspective of an inmate in prison with the refrain, "I'm down in that jail on my knees" and a reference to eating "corn bread and beans." The song has been recorded by many artists such as Woody Guthrie, Doc Watson, Bob Dylan, Skeeter Davis, Elizabeth Cotten, and the Grateful Dead, with Grateful Dead performing it 294 times live in concert. The song is featured in To Bonnie from Delaney, "Mountain Jam", Born and Raised World Tour, The Grapes of Wrath, and Lucky Stars.

Others who recorded it include Cliff Carlisle (also as "Down in the Jail on My Knees"), Woody Guthrie (also as "Blowin' Down This Road" or "I Ain't Gonna Be Treated This Way"), Bill Monroe, Earl Scruggs, Roy Hall, Elizabeth Cotten and the Grateful Dead, Delaney and Bonnie, Canned Heat and Dillard Chandler.

== Lyrics and chords ==
Goin' Down The Road Feelin' Bad, 1953 (instrumental version by Roy Hall)

=== Lyrics ===
There are many versions of the song's words. The following are the lyrics sung by Bill Monroe. They are nearly the same as in the 1933's version of Cliff Carlisle with string bass and harmonica.

1. I'm going down this road feeling bad
I'm going down this road feeling bad
I'm going down this road feeling bad, lord, lord
And I ain't a-gonna be treated this a-way

2. I'm down in the jailhouse on my knees
Down in the jailhouse on my knees
Down in the jailhouse on my knees, lord, lord
And I ain't a-gonna be treated this a-way

3. They feed me on corn bread and beans
They feed me on corn bread and beans
They feed me on corn bread and beans, lord, lord
And I ain't a-gonna be treated this a-way

4. Got two dollar shoes on my feet
Got two dollar shoes on my feet
Two dollar shoes they hurt my feet, lord, lord
And I ain't a-gonna be treated this a-way

5. It takes a ten dollar shoe to fit my foot
It takes a ten dollar shoe to fit my foot
It takes a ten dollar shoe to fit my foot, Great God
And I ain't a-gonna be treated this a-way

6. I'm going where the weather fits my clothes
I'm going where the weather fits my clothes
I'm going where the weather fits my clothes, lord lord
And I ain't a-gonna be treated this a-way

The following are the lyrics as performed by The Grateful Dead:

Goin' down the road feelin' bad.
Goin' down the road feelin' bad.
Goin' down the road feelin' bad.
I don't want to be treated this away.

Goin' where the climate suits my clothes.
Goin' where the climate suits my clothes.
Goin' where the climate suits my clothes.
I don't want to be treated this away.

Goin' down the road feelin' bad.
Goin' down the road feelin' bad.
Goin' down the road feelin' bad.
I don't want to be treated this away.

Goin' where the water tastes like wine.
Goin' where the water tastes like wine.
Goin' where the water tastes like wine.
I don't want to be treated this away.

Goin' down the road feelin' bad.
Goin' down the road feelin' bad.
Goin' down the road feelin' bad.
I don't want to be treated this away.

Goin' where the chilly winds don't blow.
Goin' where the chilly winds don't blow.
Goin' where those chilly winds don't blow.
I don't want to be treated this away.

== Notable covers and mentions ==
One line of this song is quoted verbatim in the song "Everybody's Talkin'", written by Fred Neil and popularized by Harry Nilsson:

Going where the weather suits my clothes

=== Skeeter Davis version ===
"Goin' Down the Road (Feelin' Bad)"

Single by Skeeter Davis

from the album My Heart's in the Country
- B-side: "I Can't Stand the Sight of You"
- Released: September 1966
- Recorded: June 1966
- Studio: RCA Studio B, Nashville
- Genre: Traditional country
- Length: 2:02
- Label: RCA Victor
- Songwriter: Traditional
- Producer: Chet Atkins

Skeeter Davis singles chronology
| "If I Had Wheels" (1966) | "Goin' Down the Road (Feelin' Bad)" (1966) | "Fuel to the Flame" (1967) |

American country artist, Skeeter Davis, notably covered the track under the title "Goin' Down the Road (Feelin' Bad)". At the time of its recording, Davis had reached her commercial peak recording country pop crossover singles, most significantly with 1963's "The End of the World".

Davis took a more traditional approach to recording for her 1966 album My Heart's in the Country, which included "Goin' Down the Road (Feelin' Bad)". The track was cut at the RCA Victor Studios located in Nashville, Tennessee in June 1966. The session was produced by Chet Atkins. Davis herself was credited on the single's release for arranging the song's recording.

"Goin' Down the Road (Feelin' Bad)" was released as a single by RCA Victor in September 1966. The song peaked at number 36 on the American Billboard Hot Country Songs chart in late 1966. It was her first top 40 entry on the chart as a solo artist since mid 1965. The song was included on Davis's 1966 studio album called My Heart's in the Country.

Track listing (7" vinyl single)

- "Goin' Down the Road (Feelin' Bad)" – 2:02
- "I Can't Stand the Sight of You" – 2:23

Chart performance

| Chart (1966) | Peak position |
|---|---|
| US Hot Country Songs (Billboard) | 36 |

== Usage in Media ==
Cliff Carlisle's cover of the song is featured in the 2017 video game Getting Over It with Bennett Foddy as the first song to play when the player loses significant amounts of progress. During the credits that play upon completion of the game, a cover of the song is also sung by the titular developer of the game, Bennett Foddy.

== Sources ==
- Waltz, Robert B; David G. Engle. "Going Down This Road Feeling Bad ". The Traditional Ballad Index: An Annotated Bibliography of the Folk Songs of the English-Speaking World. Hosted by California State University, Fresno, Folklore, 2007.
- Erbsen, Wayne (2003). "Lonesome Road Blues". Rural Roots of Bluegrass: Songs, Stories and History. Pacific, Missouri: Mel Bay Publications. ISBN 0786671378.
- Bluegrass Lyrics for the song's words
- Ultimate Guitar for the guitar chords
