= Mexicali Blues (song) =

Song by Bob Weir

from the album Ace
- Released: May 1972
- Recorded: January–March 1972
- Studio: Wally Heider, San Francisco, California
- Genre: Country rock, honky-tonk
- Length: 3:24
- Label: Warner Bros.
- Composer: Bob Weir
- Lyricist: John Perry Barlow

"Mexicali Blues" is a song from Bob Weir's 1972 Ace solo album that, like the rest of the material on that record, was de facto by the Grateful Dead. Indeed, it appears on the 1974 Skeletons from the Closet: The Best of Grateful Dead compilation.

"Mexicali Blues" was written by Bob Weir and lyricist John Perry Barlow. This was the first songwriting collaboration for Weir and Barlow. Barlow has noted that Weir had an idea for a "cowboy song" and asked Barlow to write the lyrics after Robert Hunter declined. Weir would soon switch to using Barlow rather than Hunter for the bulk of his songwriting.

The song concerns a man who had recently ridden to Mexicali, Mexico from Bakersfield, California. There over a bottle of booze, he thinks back upon his meeting a fourteen-year-old girl named "Billie Jean" and falling under her spell; she later appeals to the narrator to shoot a stranger when she tells him that unless he uses his gun to prevent it, the stranger will take her away. He does shoot and kill the stranger (who never even drew his gun), and then flees to the desert rather than face hanging for his crime.

The song echos "El Paso" by Marty Robbins, in which a cowboy shoots a man in a jealous rage over a Mexican girl and then flees to avoid hanging. Phil Lesh provides the harmony vocal. When performed live, the harmony vocals evolved over time.

During the early 1970s, Phil Lesh provided harmony vocals. After the band's 1975 hiatus, lead guitarist Jerry Garcia took over the harmonizing vocals (Phil Lesh stopped most of his singing during this time due to vocal strain). When the band restructured in 1979 with the departure of Keith and Donna Godchaux and the welcoming of Brent Mydland at keyboards, which would define the sound of the band throughout the 1980s, Mydland took over harmonizing vocals from Garcia, enabling Garcia to play lead guitar during the song's refrain. Additionally, the second instrumental break in the song was extended, allowing for more improvisation.
