= Playing in the Band =

1971 song by the Grateful Dead

Song by Grateful Dead

from the album Grateful Dead
- Released: October 1971
- Recorded: April 6, 1971
- Venue: Hammerstein Ballroom, New York City
- Genre: Rock, jam, psychedelic rock
- Length: 4:39
- Label: Warner Bros.
- Composer: Bob Weir
- Lyricist: Robert Hunter
- Producer: Grateful Dead

"Playing in the Band" is a song by the Grateful Dead. The lyrics were written by Robert Hunter and rhythm guitarist Bob Weir composed the music, with some assistance from percussionist Mickey Hart. The song first emerged in embryonic form on the self-titled 1971 live album Grateful Dead. It then appeared in a more polished form on Ace, Weir's first solo album (which included every Grateful Dead member except Hart and Ron "Pigpen" McKernan).

In August 2026, Rolling Stone ranked this song as the 13th of 100 best Grateful Dead song of all time.

== Origins ==
The instrumental break of "Playing in the Band" was introduced as early as the February 19, 1969 "Celestial Synapse" show at the Fillmore West, in which it appears somewhat indistinct from the preceding and following jams. The completed song debuted (along with five others) on February 18, 1971, at the Capitol Theatre in Port Chester, New York. It was also included on Mickey Hart's 1972 solo album Rolling Thunder within "The Main Ten", making reference to the song's time signature of 10/4. "The Main Ten" appears on Dick's Picks Volume 16, from their performance at the Fillmore West on November 8, 1969. On that set, it appears in the middle of "Caution (Do Not Stop On Tracks)".

During a Bob Weir and Wolf Bros concert livestream on February 12, 2021, Weir credited David Crosby with the composition of the main riff. Weir stated, "David Crosby came up with the seminal lick... and then he left. We were out at Mickey's barn. So Mickey said, 'Make a song out of that'. Next day, I had it."

== Live performances ==
The song has become one of the best-known Grateful Dead numbers and a standard part of their repertoire. According to Deadbase X, it ranks fourth on the list of songs played most often in concert by the band with 581 performances.

In the Grateful Dead's live repertoire, all songs featured musical improvisation and many featured extended instrumental solos; but certain key songs were used as starting points for collective musical improvisation by the whole group. In this regard "Playing in the Band" was of major importance; the band played the opening versus and choruses, then improvised as a band, sometimes for twenty minutes or more, before ending with a final chorus. Sometimes during these extended "jams", the band would even perform other entire songs, before at last coming back around to the final chorus from "Playing in the Band".

Its performance on 21 May 1974 at the Hec Edmundson Pavilion in Seattle has been cited as the longest uninterrupted performance of a single song in the Grateful Dead's history, clocking in at 46 minutes and 32 seconds. It was released in 2018 on the boxset Pacific Northwest '73–'74: The Complete Recordings and as its own LP.
