= Weather Report Suite =

Song by Grateful Dead

from the album Wake of the Flood
- Released: October 15, 1973
- Studio: The Record Plant (Sausalito)
- Genre: Progressive rock; folk rock
- Length: 12:41
- Label: Grateful Dead
- Songwriters: Bob Weir; Eric Andersen; John Perry Barlow
- Producer: Grateful Dead

"Weather Report Suite" is a song by American rock band the Grateful Dead. It was released on October 15, 1973, as the seventh and final track on the band's sixth studio album Wake of the Flood. A three-part suite, it was written by rhythm guitarist and vocalist Bob Weir with lyrics contributed by Eric Andersen and John Perry Barlow.

"Weather Report Suite" has received positive reviews from critics, being praised as one of Weir's greatest compositions. Despite this, the full suite did not appear in the band's setlists after 1974, though its final part, "Let It Grow", remained a live staple. An edit of the song's first half was released as the B-side to "Eyes of the World".

== Overview ==
"Weather Report Suite" is the longest track on Wake of the Flood, running over twelve minutes and constituting more than half of the album's second side. The song has been described as a progressive rock suite also containing elements of folk rock, orchestral rock and pop. In This Is All a Dream We Dreamed: An Oral History of the Grateful Dead, writer David Gans cites the song, alongside "Eyes of the World", as evidence of the band's "transition out of the good-time country stuff into a different direction", being more harmonically and rhythmically experimental. David Fricke describes the suite as "a meditation on changing seasons and the miracle of birth in serial tides of bracing chorale, like a Marin County twist on the Beach Boys' 'Heroes and Villains'."

The different sections of "Weather Report Suite" were debuted in concert over a period of months, starting with the "Prelude" section which was first performed in November 1972. The entire suite was performed for the first time on September 8, 1973 at the Nassau Coliseum in Uniondale, New York. "Prelude" is an instrumental which Lindsay Planer of AllMusic describes as a "simple earthy acoustic melody". Part I contains lyrics written by singer-songwriter Eric Andersen, which Planer characterizes as "poignant" and "lovelorn". Writing for the band's official website, David Dodd notes the use of the changing seasons as a metaphor for the "singer's state of mind as he reflects on the coming of love, and maybe its going, too". Andrew Sacher of BrooklynVegan describes this section as "gentle folk rock that isn't miles away from Workingman's Dead/American Beauty", utilizing instrumentation including organ and pedal steel as well as "angelic harmonies". Oliver Trager notes the track's "earthy, naturalistic bent", highlighted by "sweet" harmonies.

=== "Let It Grow" ===
While the "Prelude" and "Part 1" sections were dropped from the band's setlists after 1974 (a decision which has been variously attributed to the band's struggle to execute its vocal harmonies as well as the overall complexity of the suite), "Let It Grow" remained a concert staple for the entirety of the band's existence, being played a total of 276 times. Featuring lyrics written by Barlow, "Let It Grow" contrasts what Planer calls the "leisurely pace" of the suite's first half with "renewed spirit". The song, initially entitled "I Am the Rain", was mainly composed in the studio, and marked a rare occasion of Weir's music and Barlow's lyrics being written simultaneously. Characteristics of the song include the use of a horn section, as well as "howling, call-and-response choruses". In Dodd's interpretation of the lyrics, Barlow "invokes the earthly elements of water, earth, air, and fire", while also utilizing biblical references and the "invocation of several major doctrinal issues" relating to spirituality and religion, such as "the name of the divine".

== Reception ==
"Weather Report Suite" has received a positive reception from critics. Ultimate Classic Rock deemed the composition to be a "progressive masterwork", while noting that its studio rendition "merely hints at the dimension it would eventually take in concert". Cash Box highlighted Part II as "diverse and compelling", while Planer praised its "tasteful incorporation of an otherwise rarely used horn section". Phish bassist Mike Gordon chose the song for his list of "Five Songs That Transported Me". Both the entirety of "Weather Report Suite" and "Let It Grow" separately were included on Rolling Stone's list of the 100 best Grateful Dead songs, with the suite placing at number 83 and "Let It Grow" at number 61.

Upon Weir's death in 2026, many publications listed "Weather Report Suite" as one of his greatest compositions. David Fricke chose the song for Mojo's list of Weir's greatest songs, noting its placement as the "closing apex" of Wake of the Flood. BrooklynVegan named the track as Weir's best song, praising it as an "orchestral rock song cycle that rivaled Tommy and side B of Abbey Road, both in ambition and in how fun it is to listen to". Live for Live Music declared the song to be Weir's "compositional magnum opus". Stereogum chose the "Let It Grow" portion as Weir's fourth-best song, calling it a "live behemoth", highlighting the ending climax and "almost intimidating" energy of the track.
