= El Paso (song) =

1959 Marty Robbins country-western song

- El Paso by Marty Robbins

Single by Marty Robbins

from the album Gunfighter Ballads and Trail Songs
- B-side: "Running Gun"
- Released: October 26, 1959
- Recorded: April 7, 1959
- Studio: Bradley Studios, Nashville, Tennessee
- Genre: Country, Western, Tex-Mex
- Length: 4:38
- Label: Columbia
- Songwriter: Marty Robbins
- Producer: Don Law

Marty Robbins singles chronology
"Cap and Gown" (1959)	"El Paso" (1959)	"Big Iron" (1960)

"El Paso" is a western ballad written and originally recorded by Marty Robbins, and first released on Gunfighter Ballads and Trail Songs in September 1959. It was released as a single the following month, and became a major hit on both the country and pop music charts, becoming the first No. 1 hit of the 1960s on both. It won the Grammy Award for Best Country & Western Recording in 1961. It is widely considered a genre classic for its gripping narrative which ends in the death of its protagonist, its shift from past to present tense, haunting harmonies by vocalists Bobby Sykes and Jim Glaser (of the Glaser Brothers) and the eloquent and varied Spanish guitar accompaniment by Grady Martin that lends the recording a distinctive Tex-Mex feel. The name of the character Feleena was based upon a schoolmate of Robbins in the fifth grade, Fidelina Martinez.

Members of the Western Writers of America chose "El Paso" as one of the Top 100 Western songs of all time.

In 1998, the 1959 recording of "El Paso" on Columbia Records by Marty Robbins was inducted into the Grammy Hall of Fame.

== Storyline ==
The song is a first-person narrative told by a cowboy in El Paso, Texas, in the days of the Wild West. The singer recalls how he frequented "Rosa's Cantina", where he became smitten with a young Mexican dancer named Feleena. When the singer notices another cowboy sharing a drink with "wicked Feleena," out of jealousy he challenges the newcomer to a gunfight. The singer kills the newcomer, then flees. In the act of escaping, the singer commits the additional hanging offense of horse theft. Departing the town, the singer hides out in the "badlands of New Mexico."

The song then fast-forwards to an undisclosed time later – the lyrics at this point change from past to present tense – when the singer describes the yearning for Feleena that drives him to return, without regard for his own life, to El Paso. He states that his "love is stronger than [his] fear of death." Upon arriving, the singer races for the cantina, but is chased and fatally wounded by a posse. Feleena rushes to his side, and he dies in her arms after "one little kiss."

== Chart performance ==
=== Weekly charts ===
Chart (1959–1960)	Peak position
Canada (CHUM)	1
Italy (Musica e dischi)	13
South Africa (Springbok)	1
UK Singles (OCC)	19
US Billboard Hot 100	1
US Hot Country Songs (Billboard)	1
US Cash Box Top Singles	2
West Germany (GfK)	38

=== Year-end charts ===
Chart (1960)	Position
South Africa (Top 40)	4
US Billboard Hot 100	15
US Cash Box Top Singles	17

=== All-time charts ===
Chart (1958–2018)	Position
US Billboard Hot 100	417

== Versions ==
There have been three versions of Robbins' original recording of "El Paso": the original full-length version, the edited version, and the abbreviated version, which is an alternate take in stereo that can be found on the Gunfighter Ballads album. The original version, released on a 45 single record, is in mono and is around 4 minutes and 38 seconds in duration, far longer than most contemporary singles at the time, especially in the country genre. Robbins' longtime record company, Columbia Records, was unsure whether radio stations would play such a long song, so it released two versions of the song on a promo 45: the full-length version on one side, and an edited version on the other which was nearer to the three-minute mark. This version omitted a verse describing the cowboy's remorse over the "foul evil deed [he] had done" before his flight from El Paso. The record-buying public, as well as most disc jockeys, overwhelmingly preferred the full-length version.

=== Cover versions ===
"El Paso" frequently was performed by the Grateful Dead in concert. The song entered the band's repertoire in 1969, and remained there until the band parted ways after Garcia's passing in 1995; in total, it was performed 389 times. It was sung by rhythm guitarist Bob Weir, with Jerry Garcia contributing harmony vocals. On the album Ladies and Gentlemen... the Grateful Dead, Bob Weir introduces the song as the Dead's "most requested number". Later post-Garcia groups such as Furthur, The Other Ones, and Dead & Company also performed the song, though not as often.

Grady Martin released an instrumental version in 1965 on his Instrumentally Yours album.

A parody version, "El Pizza" by H.B. Barnum (under the pseudonym "Dudley") was issued in February 1960. It moved the action to Azusa, California, where Rosa's Cantina became a pizza place where Feleena worked as a waitress.

Homer and Jethro also parodied the song in their "El Paso - Numero Dos". When the singer asks for directions to Rosa's Cantina, a cab driver tells him to "ask Marty Robbins, 'cause he's the hombre who made up the song". The singer encounters a woman named "Velveeta" and asks her where she had been all his life; "she answered, 'Most of it I wasn't born'".

In the late 1980s a version for marching band (called "El Paso" (Miners Fight)) became the official fight song of the University of Texas at El Paso Miners.

Old 97's did a cover for the King of the Hill soundtrack.

Country music singer Keith Urban covered the song on the television special George Strait: ACM Artist of the Decade All Star Concert.

== Sequels ==
Robbins wrote two songs that are explicit sequels to "El Paso", one in 1966, one in 1976.

=== Feleena (From El Paso) ===
In 1966, Robbins recorded "Feleena (From El Paso)", telling the life story of Feleena, the "Mexican girl" from "El Paso", in a third-person narrative. This track was over eight minutes long. Robbins wrote most of it in Phoenix, Arizona, but went to El Paso seeking inspiration for the conclusion.

Born in a desert shack in New Mexico during a thunderstorm, Feleena runs away from home at 17, living off her charms for a year in Santa Fe, New Mexico, before moving to the brighter lights of El Paso to become a paid dancer. After another year, the narrator of "El Paso" arrives, the first man she did not have contempt for. He spends six weeks romancing her and then, in a retelling of the key moment in the original song, beset by "insane jealousy", he shoots another man with whom she was flirting.

Her lover's return to El Paso comes only a day after his flight (the original song suggests a longer time frame before his return) and as she goes to run to him, the cowboy motions to her to stay out of the line of fire and is shot; immediately after his dying kiss, Feleena shoots herself with his gun. Their ghosts are heard to this day in the wind blowing around El Paso: "It's only the young cowboy showing Feleena the town".

=== El Paso City ===
In 1976 Robbins released another reworking, "El Paso City", in which the present-day singer is a passenger on a flight over El Paso, which reminds him of a song he had heard "long ago", proceeding to summarize the original "El Paso" story. "I don't recall who sang the song," he sings, but he feels a supernatural connection to the story: "Could it be that I could be the cowboy in this mystery...," he asks, suggesting a past life. This song reached No. 1 on the country charts. The arrangement includes riffs and themes from the previous two El Paso songs. Robbins wrote it while flying over El Paso in, he reported, the same amount of time it takes to sing—four minutes and 14 seconds. It was only the second time that ever happened to him; the first time was when he composed the original "El Paso" as fast as he could write it down. Robbins intended to do one more sequel, “The Mystery of Old El Paso", but he died in late 1982 before he could finish the final song.

== In popular culture ==
The song was featured in the series finale of Breaking Bad entitled "Felina" after the character in the song. The different spelling was an anagram for "finale".

== General references ==
- Liner notes by Rich Keinzle, July 1991, to The Essential Marty Robbins: 1951-1982 Columbia Records 468909-2
