= Road Trips Volume 3 Number 3 =

Live album by Grateful Dead
- Released: June 14, 2010
- Recorded: May 15, 1970
- Genre: Rock
- Length: 230:29 bonus disc: 78:38
- Label: Grateful Dead
- Producer: Grateful Dead

Grateful Dead chronology
Crimson White & Indigo (2010)	Road Trips Volume 3 Number 3 (2010)	Road Trips Volume 3 Number 4 (2010)

Alternative cover
- Road Trips Volume 3 Number 3 Bonus Disc

Professional ratings
Review scores
Source	Rating
The Music Box	4/5 stars

Road Trips Volume 3 Number 3 is a live album by the American rock band the Grateful Dead. Recorded on May 15, 1970, and released on June 14, 2010, it was the 11th of the "Road Trips" series of albums, and the first to contain three discs instead of two.

== Recording ==
Road Trips Volume 3 Number 3 was billed as a 40th anniversary celebration of the album Workingman's Dead. It includes several versions, some acoustic and some electric, of seven of the eight songs that appear on that album, omitting only "High Time". The album contains material from two concerts — the early show and the late show — performed on May 15, 1970, at the Fillmore East in New York City. Like many early 1970 Grateful Dead shows, these concerts featured both acoustic and electric sets. The New Riders of the Purple Sage (NRPS), with whom Jerry Garcia was playing pedal steel guitar, also performed at these concerts, between the Dead's acoustic and electric sets. The NRPS sets are not included on this release.

Bill Graham is heard introducing the band at the early show, identifying them as "Pigpen on organ"; "from Atherton, California, this is Mr. Robert Weir"; "from Marin Junior College, Mr. Philip Lesh" (to which Bob Weir responds, "That's a lie!" followed by Garcia remarking, "That ain't Philip Lesh"); "from 710 Ashbury Street, Mr. Jerry Garcia"; and "on drums, the son of Lenny Hart, Mickey Hart." Hart's father was the Grateful Dead's original money manager and had disappeared with approximately $155,000 of the group's profits only two months before.

A fourth, "bonus" disc was included with early shipments of the album. The bonus disc contains additional material from the same concerts as well as four songs from the concert held the previous evening, May 14, 1970, at Meramec Community College in Kirkwood, Missouri. The version of "Easy Wind" from May 15 was previously released on the album Fallout from the Phil Zone. Including the material from the bonus disc, this release includes both May 15, 1970 Fillmore East Shows in their entirety except for the acoustic performance of "Candyman" from the late show.

Another live Grateful Dead album recorded during this same month is Dick's Picks Volume 8, which also includes both acoustic and electric sets.

== Sound quality ==
The album was released in HDCD format. This provides enhanced sound quality when played on CD players with HDCD capability, and is fully compatible with regular CD players.

== Track listing ==
=== Disc One ===
May 15, 1970: Fillmore East, New York, NY
Early Show: Acoustic:

1. "Don't Ease Me In" (traditional) – 4:24
2. "I Know You Rider" (traditional) – 8:39
3. "Ain't It Crazy (The Rub)" (Lightnin' Hopkins) – 3:56
4. "Long Black Limousine" (Vern Stovall, Bobby George) – 4:54
5. "New Speedway Boogie" (Jerry Garcia, Robert Hunter) – 6:23

Early Show: Electric:

6. "Casey Jones" (Hunter, Garcia) – 5:02
7. "St. Stephen" > (Garcia, Phil Lesh, Hunter) – 5:47
8. "That's It for the Other One" > (Garcia, Bill Kreutzmann, Lesh, Ron McKernan, Bob Weir) – 24:29
  - I. Cryptical Envelopment
  - II. Drums
  - III. The Other One
  - IV. Cryptical Envelopment
9. "Cosmic Charlie" (Garcia, Hunter) – 7:59

Early Show: Encore: Electric:

10. "New Minglewood Blues" (Noah Lewis) – 3:36

=== Disc Two ===
May 15, 1970: Fillmore East, New York, NY
Late Show: Acoustic:

1. "Deep Elem Blues" (traditional) – 5:42
2. "The Ballad of Casey Jones" (traditional) – 4:49
3. "Silver Threads and Golden Needles" (Jack Rhodes, Dick Reynolds) – 3:49
4. "Black Peter" (Garcia, Hunter) – 7:23
5. "Friend of the Devil" (Garcia, John Dawson, Hunter) – 4:06 (Note: Previously released as a bonus track on reissues of American Beauty)
6. "Uncle John's Band" (Garcia, Hunter) – 7:01
7. "She's Mine" (Hopkins) – 2:54
8. "Katie Mae" (Hopkins) – 4:38
9. "A Voice from On High" (Bill Monroe) – 2:52

Late Show: Electric:

10. "China Cat Sunflower" > (Garcia, Hunter) – 4:58
11. "I Know You Rider" (traditional) – 4:39
12. "Cumberland Blues" (Garcia, Lesh, Hunter) – 5:14
13. "Hard to Handle" (Alvertis Isbell, Allen Jones, Otis Redding) – 5:51
14. "Morning Dew" (Bonnie Dobson, Tim Rose) – 10:53
15. "Dire Wolf" (Garcia, Hunter) – 3:54

=== Disc Three ===
May 15, 1970: Fillmore East, New York, NY
Late Show: Electric:

1. "Good Lovin' " (Rudy Clark, Arthur Resnick) – 13:45
2. "Dark Star" > (Garcia, Mickey Hart, Kreutzmann, Lesh, McKernan, Weir, Hunter) – 19:40
3. "St. Stephen" > (Garcia, Lesh, Hunter) – 6:04
4. "Not Fade Away" > (Buddy Holly, Norman Petty) – 6:53
5. "Turn On Your Love Light" (Joseph Scott, Deadric Malone) – 27:45

Late Show: Encore: Acoustic:

6. "Cold Jordan" (traditional) – 2:33

=== Bonus Disc ===
May 15, 1970: Fillmore East, New York, NY
Early Show: Acoustic:

1. "Friend Of The Devil" (Garcia, Dawson, Hunter) – 4:02
2. "Candyman" (Garcia, Hunter) – 6:11
3. "Cumberland Blues" (Garcia, Lesh, Hunter) – 4:52
4. "Cold Jordan" (traditional) – 2:30

Early Show: Electric:

5. "Easy Wind" (Hunter) – 8:17 (Note: Previously released on Fallout from the Phil Zone)
6. "Attics of My Life" (Garcia, Hunter) – 5:46

Late Show: Electric:

7. "Beat It on Down the Line" (Jesse Fuller) – 3:17 (listed as 3:08 on CD)
8. "Next Time You See Me" (Frank Forest, William G. Harvey) – 3:32

May 14, 1970: Meramec Community College, Kirkwood, Missouri

9. "New Speedway Boogie" > (Garcia, Hunter) – 9:25
10. "St. Stephen" > (Garcia, Lesh, Hunter) – 6:30
11. "Not Fade Away" > (Holly, Petty) – 9:44 (listed as 6:37 on CD)
12. "Turn On Your Lovelight" (Scott, Malone) – 17:38

== Personnel ==
=== Grateful Dead ===
- Jerry Garcia – Electric and Acoustic Lead Guitar, Vocals
- Mickey Hart – Drums
- Bill Kreutzmann – Drums
- Phil Lesh – Electric Bass, Vocals
- Ron "Pigpen" McKernan – Vocals, Organ, Percussion, Harmonica, Acoustic Guitar
- Bob Weir – Electric and Acoustic Rhythm Guitar, Vocals

=== Additional musicians ===
- John Dawson – harmony vocals on "A Voice from On High" and "Cold Jordan"
- David Nelson – mandolin on "A Voice from On High" and "Cold Jordan"

=== Production ===
- Produced by Grateful Dead
- Compilation Produced by David Lemieux & Blair Jackson
- Recorded by Bob Matthews
- CD Mastering by Jeffrey Norman at Mockingbird Mastering, Petaluma, CA
- Cover Art by Scott McDougall
- Interior Photos by Amalie Rothschild and Peter Simon
- Historical Essay by Blair Jackson
- Package Design by Steve Vance

== Full Set Lists ==
Following are the full set lists for the concerts included in Road Trips Volume 3 Number 3:

=== May 14, 1970 - Meramec Community College, Kirkwood, Missouri ===
- Acoustic Grateful Dead "Don't Ease Me In", "Friend of the Devil", "Deep Elem Blues", "Silver Threads and Golden Needles", "Candyman"
- New Riders of the Purple Sage "Six Days on the Road", "Whatcha Gonna Do", "Brown-Eyed Handsome Man", "I Don't Know You", "Cecilia", "Can't Pay the Price", "Henry (interrupted)", "Henry", "Garden of Eden", "Fair Chance to Know", "Last Lonely Eagle", "Lodi", "Honkytonk Woman", "The Weight"
- Electric Grateful Dead "Casey Jones", "China Cat Sunflower" > "I Know You Rider", "Mama Tried" > "High Time", "Drums" > "Good Lovin' " > "Drums" > "Good Lovin' ", "Good Morning Little Schoolgirl", "Me & My Uncle", "Dire Wolf", "Cold, Rain & Snow", "Attics of My Life", "Cumberland Blues", "New Speedway Boogie"** > "Nobody's Fault But Mine Jam"** > "New Speedway Boogie"** > "St. Stephen"** > "Not Fade Away"** > "Turn On Your Lovelight"**
- Encore: "Cold Jordan"

=== May 15, 1970, Early Show - Fillmore East, New York, New York ===
- Acoustic Grateful Dead "Don't Ease Me In"*, "I Know You Rider"*, "Ain't It Crazy (The Rub)"*, "Friend of the Devil"**, "Long Black Limousine"*, "Candyman"**, "Cumberland Blues"**, "New Speedway Boogie"*, "Cold Jordan"** (with New Riders)
- New Riders of the Purple Sage "Six Days on the Road", "Whatcha Gonna Do", "I Don't Know You", "Henry", "Portland Woman", "Fair Chance to Know", "Last Lonely Eagle"
- Electric Grateful Dead' "Casey Jones"*, "Easy Wind"**, "Attics of My Life"**, "St. Stephen"* > "Cryptical Envelopment"* > "Drums"* > "The Other One"* > "Cryptical Envelopment"* > "Cosmic Charlie"*
- Encore: "New Minglewood Blues"*

=== May 15, 1970, Late Show - Fillmore East, New York, New York ===
- Acoustic Grateful Dead "Deep Elem Blues"*, "The Ballad of Casey Jones"*, "Silver Threads and Golden Needles"*, "Black Peter"*, "Friend of the Devil"*, "Uncle John's Band"*, "Candyman", "She's Mine"*, "Katie Mae"*, "A Voice From On High"*
- New Riders of the Purple Sage "Brown-Eyed Handsome Man", "Louisiana Lady", "Can't Pay the Price", "Truck Drivin' Man", "All I Ever Wanted", "Workingman's Blues", "Henry", "I Don't Know You", "Lodi", "Last Lonely Eagle", "Mama Tried"@,"Sawmill"@, "Me & My Uncle"@, "Connection"@ (@ with Bob Weir)
- Electric Grateful Dead' "China Cat Sunflower"* > "I Know You Rider"*, "Cumberland Blues"*, "Hard to Handle"*, "Beat It On Down The Line"**, "Morning Dew"*, "Good Lovin' "*, "Dire Wolf"*, "Next Time You See Me"**, "Dark Star"* > "St. Stephen"* > "Not Fade Away"* > "Turn On Your Lovelight"*
- Encore: "Cold Jordan"* (with New Riders)

*Included in the Road Trips Volume 3 Number 3

**Included in the Road Trips Volume 3 Number 3 bonus disc
