= Crimson White & Indigo =

Live album by Grateful Dead
- Released: April 20, 2010
- Recorded: July 7, 1989
- Genre: Rock
- Length: 174:58
- Label: Grateful Dead Records
- Producer: Grateful Dead

Grateful Dead chronology
Road Trips Volume 3 Number 2 (2010)	Crimson White & Indigo (2010)	Road Trips Volume 3 Number 3 (2010)

Professional ratings
Review scores
Source	Rating
Allmusic	3.5/5 stars
All About Jazz	(favorable)
The Music Box	4.5/5 stars

Crimson White & Indigo is a live album by the American rock band the Grateful Dead. It contains the complete concert recorded at John F. Kennedy Stadium in Philadelphia on July 7, 1989. The album consists of three CDs, plus a video recording of the same show on one DVD. It was released on April 20, 2010. The video was produced and directed by Len Dell'Amico.

This concert was the last event held at JFK Stadium, which was condemned by the city six days later and would be demolished in 1992. One track from this concert, "Blow Away", had been previously released as a bonus track on the expanded version of the Grateful Dead's last studio album, Built To Last.

The previous concert in this tour, performed at Rich Stadium in Buffalo, New York, on July 4, 1989, was released in 2005 as the album Truckin' Up to Buffalo. That title also was produced on both CD and DVD, but separately rather than together in the same package.

The name Crimson White & Indigo is taken from the lyrics of the song "Standing on the Moon", which the Dead first performed earlier in 1989. The version of this song featured in this release is considered an exceptional performance by fans, with an extended ending improvisation.

== Track listing ==
=== Disc one ===
First set:

1. "Hell In A Bucket" (Bob Weir, John Barlow) – 6:49
2. "Iko Iko" (James "Sugar Boy" Crawford) – 7:46
3. "Little Red Rooster" (Willie Dixon) – 9:32
4. "Ramble On Rose" (Jerry Garcia, Robert Hunter) – 7:35
5. "Stuck Inside of Mobile with the Memphis Blues Again" (Bob Dylan) – 9:17
6. "Loser" > (Garcia, Hunter) – 7:15
7. "Let It Grow" > (Weir, Barlow) – 12:42
8. "Blow Away" (Brent Mydland, Barlow) – 12:28

=== Disc two ===
Second set:

1. "Box of Rain" (Phil Lesh, Hunter) – 4:46
2. "Scarlet Begonias" > (Garcia, Hunter) – 9:58
3. "Fire on the Mountain" (Mickey Hart, Hunter) – 13:42
4. "Estimated Prophet" > (Weir, Barlow) – 9:12
5. "Standing on the Moon" > (Garcia, Hunter) – 8:19
6. "Rhythm Devils" > (Hart, Bill Kreutzmann) – 10:08

=== Disc three ===
1. "Space" > (Garcia, Lesh, Weir) – 10:09
2. "The Other One" > (Weir, Kreutzmann) – 7:47
3. "Wharf Rat" > (Garcia, Hunter) – 10:32
4. "Turn On Your Love Light" (Joseph Scott, Deadric Malone) – 8:20

Encore:

5. "Knockin' on Heaven's Door" (Dylan) – 8:41

== Personnel ==
=== Grateful Dead ===
- Jerry Garcia – guitar, vocals
- Mickey Hart – drums, percussion
- Bill Kreutzmann – drums, percussion
- Phil Lesh – electric bass, vocals
- Brent Mydland – keyboards, Hammond B3, vocals
- Bob Weir – guitar, vocals

=== Production ===
- Producer – David Lemieux
- Video Director - Len Dell'Amico
- Recording – John Cutler
- Stereo and 5.1 Mix – Michael McGinn
- 5.1 Stereo Mastering for CD and DVD – David Glasser at Airshow Mastering, Boulder, Colorado
- Video Editing, DVD Production and Authoring – Video Arts, San Francisco
- Video Producer – Len Dell'Amico
- Cover Art – Scott McDougall
- Art Direction and Design – Steve Vance
- Photography – Robert Minkin
- Essay – Steve Silberman
