= Road Trips Volume 3 Number 1 =

Live album by Grateful Dead
- Released: November 10, 2009
- Recorded: December 28, 1979
- Genre: Rock
- Length: 152:32 bonus disc: 78:53
- Label: Grateful Dead
- Producer: Grateful Dead

Grateful Dead chronology
| Winterland June 1977: The Complete Recordings (2009) | Road Trips Volume 3 Number 1 (2009) | Road Trips Volume 3 Number 2 (2010) |

Alternative cover
- Road Trips Volume 3 Number 1 Bonus Disc

Professional ratings
Review scores
| Source | Rating |
|---|---|
| Allmusic | 3.5/5 stars |
| All About Jazz | (favorable) |
| The Music Box | 4/5 stars |
| Rolling Stone | 4/5 stars |

Road Trips Volume 3 Number 1 is a two-CD live album by the American rock band the Grateful Dead. The ninth in their "Road Trips" series of albums, it was recorded on December 28, 1979, at the Oakland Auditorium in Oakland, California, and contains the complete show from that date. A third, bonus disc included with some copies of the album was recorded two nights later, December 30, 1979, at the same venue. The album was released on November 10, 2009.

Another Grateful Dead album that was recorded at the December 1979 run of concerts at the Oakland Auditorium is Dick's Picks Volume 5.

== Track listing ==
=== Disc One ===
First set:

1. "Sugaree" (Jerry Garcia, Robert Hunter) – 16:04
2. "Mama Tried" > (Merle Haggard) – 2:26
3. "Mexicali Blues" (Bob Weir, John Perry Barlow) – 4:54
4. "Row Jimmy" (Garcia, Hunter) – 13:15
5. "It's All Over Now" (Bobby Womack, Shirley Womack) – 8:19
6. "High Time" (Garcia, Hunter) – 7:02
7. "The Music Never Stopped" (Weir, Barlow) – 8:51

Second set:

8. "Alabama Getaway" (Garcia, Hunter) – 7:06
9. "Greatest Story Ever Told" (Weir, Mickey Hart, Hunter) – 5:07

=== Disc Two ===
1. "Terrapin Station" > (Garcia, Hunter) – 14:03
2. "Playing in the Band" > (Weir, Hart, Hunter) – 17:29
3. "Rhythm Devils" > (Hart, Bill Kreutzmann) – 7:36
4. "Space" > (Grateful Dead) – 2:28
5. "Uncle John's Band" > (Garcia, Hunter) – 9:34
6. "I Need a Miracle" > (Weir, Barlow) – 4:05
7. "Bertha" > (Garcia, Hunter) – 6:31
8. "Good Lovin' " (Artie Resnick, Rudy Clark) – 7:28

Encore:

9. "Casey Jones" (Garcia, Hunter) – 5:14
10. "One More Saturday Night" (Weir) – 4:56

=== Bonus Disc ===
December 30, 1979:

1. "New Minglewood Blues" (Noah Lewis) – 8:21
2. "Candyman" (Garcia, Hunter) – 6:56
3. "Ramble On Rose" (Garcia, Hunter) – 7:44
4. "Lazy Lightning" > (Weir, Barlow) – 3:27
5. "Supplication" (Weir, Barlow) – 5:54
6. "Scarlet Begonias" > (Garcia, Hunter) – 10:24
7. "Fire on the Mountain" > (Hart, Hunter) – 9:23
8. "Let It Grow" (Weir, Barlow) – 10:10
9. "Truckin' " > (Garcia, Phil Lesh, Weir, Hunter) – 7:21
10. "Wharf Rat" (Garcia, Hunter) – 9:11

== Personnel ==
=== Grateful Dead ===
- Jerry Garcia – lead guitar, vocals
- Mickey Hart – drums
- Bill Kreutzmann – drums
- Phil Lesh – electric bass, vocals
- Brent Mydland – keyboards, vocals
- Bob Weir – rhythm guitar, vocals

=== Production ===
- Produced by Grateful Dead
- Photos by Jay Blakesberg
- Booklet essay by Steve Silberman

== December 30, 1979 set list ==
The set list for the December 30, 1979 concert at the Oakland Auditorium Arena was:

- First set: "New Minglewood Blues"*, "Candyman"*, "Me and My Uncle" > "Big River", "Ramble On Rose"*, "Lazy Lightnin' "* > "Supplication"*, "Deal"
- Second set: "Scarlet Begonias"* > "Fire on the Mountain"*, "Let It Grow"* > "Drums" > "Space" > "Truckin' "* > "Wharf Rat"* > "Around & Around" > "Johnny B. Goode"
- Encore: "Don't Ease Me In", "Brokedown Palace"

* Included in the Road Trips Volume 3 Number 1 bonus disc
