= Road Trips Volume 3 Number 4 =

Live album by Grateful Dead
- Released: September 7, 2010
- Recorded: May 6–7, 1980
- Genre: Rock
- Length: 237:03
- Label: Grateful Dead
- Producer: Grateful Dead

Grateful Dead chronology
Road Trips Volume 3 Number 3 (2010)	Road Trips Volume 3 Number 4 (2010)	Formerly the Warlocks (2010)

Professional ratings
Review scores
Source	Rating
The Music Box	3.5/5 stars

Road Trips Volume 3 Number 4 is a live album by the rock band the Grateful Dead. The 12th of the Road Trips series of archival releases, it was recorded on May 6, 1980, at Recreation Hall, Pennsylvania State University, State College, Pennsylvania, and on May 7, 1980, at Barton Hall, Cornell University, Ithaca, New York. It was released on September 7, 2010.

Road Trips Volume 3 Number 4 was the second Road Trips album, after Volume 3 Number 3, to contain three CDs; each of the previous entries in the series had contained two CDs. It was the first Road Trips to be released without a bonus disc.

The first disc of Road Trips Volume 3 Number 4 contains selections from the first sets of both concerts. Disc two is the complete second set from Penn State. Disc three is the complete second set from Cornell, except for a few minutes of "Rhythm Devils" and "Space".

== Track listing ==
Disc 1
No.	Title	Recording venue and date	Length
1.	"Jack Straw" (Bob Weir, Robert Hunter)	Cornell University, May 7, 1980	7:04
2.	"Peggy-O" (traditional)	Penn State University, May 6, 1980	7:03
3.	"Me and My Uncle >" (John Phillips)	Penn State University, May 6, 1980	3:08
4.	"Big River" (Johnny Cash)	Penn State University, May 6, 1980	5:56
5.	"Loser" (Jerry Garcia, Hunter)	Penn State University, May 6, 1980	7:54
6.	"Cassidy" (Weir, John Perry Barlow)	Cornell University, May 7, 1980	5:13
7.	"Row Jimmy" (Garcia, Hunter)	Cornell University, May 7, 1980	12:02
8.	"Lazy Lightning >" (Weir, Barlow)	Penn State University, May 6, 1980	3:40
9.	"Supplication" (Weir, Barlow)	Penn State University, May 6, 1980	4:40
10.	"Althea" (Garcia, Hunter)	Penn State University, May 6, 1980	9:26
11.	"Lost Sailor >" (Weir, Barlow)	Penn State University, May 6, 1980	6:11
12.	"Saint of Circumstance" (Weir, Barlow)	Penn State University, May 6, 1980	6:22

Disc 2 (all tracks recorded at Penn State University on May 6, 1980)
No.	Title	Length
1.	"China Cat Sunflower >" (Garcia, Hunter)	6:06
2.	"I Know You Rider" (traditional)	7:10
3.	"Feel Like a Stranger >" (Weir, Barlow)	9:55
4.	"He's Gone >" (Garcia, Hunter)	13:54
5.	"The Other One >" (Weir, Bill Kreutzmann)	10:21
6.	"Rhythm Devils >" (Mickey Hart, Kreutzmann)	9:09
7.	"Space >" (Garcia, Phil Lesh, Weir)	3:45
8.	"Wharf Rat >" (Garcia, Hunter)	10:32
9.	"Around and Around >" (Chuck Berry)	4:08
10.	"Johnny B. Goode" (Berry)	4:18

Disc 3 (all tracks recorded at Cornell University on May 7, 1980)
No.	Title	Length
1.	"Shakedown Street >" (Garcia, Hunter)	13:55
2.	"Bertha >" (Garcia, Hunter)	6:43
3.	"Playing in the Band >" (Weir, Hart, Hunter)	9:22
4.	"Terrapin Station >" (Garcia, Hunter)	13:14
5.	"Rhythm Devils >" (Hart, Kreutzmann)	4:39
6.	"Space >" (Garcia, Lesh, Weir)	4:02
7.	"Saint of Circumstance >" (Weir, Barlow)	6:04
8.	"Black Peter >" (Garcia, Hunter)	9:39
9.	"Playing in the Band >" (Weir, Hart, Hunter)	3:29
10.	"Good Lovin' " (Rudy Clark, Arthur Resnick)	7:52

== Personnel ==
=== Grateful Dead ===
- Jerry Garcia – lead guitarist, vocals
- Mickey Hart – drums
- Bill Kreutzmann – drums
- Phil Lesh – electric bass
- Brent Mydland – keyboards, vocals
- Bob Weir – rhythm guitar, vocals

=== Production ===
- Grateful Dead – producer
- David Lemieux – release producer
- Blair Jackson – release producer
- Dan Healy – recording
- Jeffrey Norman – CD mastering
- Scott McDougall – cover art
- William Ames – photography
- James R. Anderson – photography
- Jay Blakesberg – photography
- Peter Dervin – photography
- Steve Vance – package design
- Blair Jackson – liner notes

== Set lists ==
Following are the full set lists for the Penn State and Cornell concerts:

Penn State University, May 6, 1980

- First set: "Alabama Getaway" > "Greatest Story Ever Told", "Peggy-O"*, "Me and My Uncle"* > "Big River"*, "Loser"*, "Far From Me", "Lazy Lightning"* > "Supplication"*, "Althea"*, "Lost Sailor"* > "Saint of Circumstance"*
- Second set: "China Cat Sunflower"* > "I Know You Rider"*, "Feel Like a Stranger"* > "He's Gone"* > "The Other One"* > "Rhythm Devils"* > "Space"* > "Wharf Rat"* > "Around and Around"* "Johnny B. Goode"*
- Encore: "Brokedown Palace"

Cornell University, May 7, 1980

- First set: "Jack Straw"*, "Tennessee Jed", "Cassidy"*, "Row Jimmy"*, "El Paso", "Easy to Love You", "Althea", "Feel Like a Stranger", "Don't Ease Me In"
- Second set: "Shakedown Street"* > "Bertha"* > "Playing in the Band"* > "Terrapin Station"* > "Rhythm Devils"* > "Space"* > "Saint of Circumstance"* > "Black Peter"* > "Playing in the Band"* > "Good Lovin' "*
- Encore: "Alabama Getaway"

*included in Road Trips Volume 3 Number 4
