= Dick's Picks Volume 35 =

Live album by Grateful Dead
- Released: June 17, 2005
- Recorded: August 7, 1971; August 24, 1971; August 6, 1971
- Genre: Rock
- Length: 290:56
- Label: Grateful Dead Records

Grateful Dead chronology
Grateful Dead Download Series Volume 2 (2005)	Dick's Picks Volume 35 (2005)	Grateful Dead Download Series Volume 3 (2005)

Professional ratings
Review scores
Source	Rating
Allmusic	3.5/5 stars
The Music Box	4/5 stars
TheBestOfWebsite	B+

Dick's Picks Volume 35 is the 35th installment of the Dick's Pick's series of Grateful Dead concert recordings. It is a four-CD set that contains the complete show recorded on August 7, 1971, at Golden Hall in San Diego, California, and a large portion of the show on August 24, 1971, at the Auditorium Theatre in Chicago, Illinois. It also includes bonus tracks from August 6, 1971, at the Hollywood Palladium in Hollywood, California.

The album was created using "the houseboat tapes," reel-to-reel soundboard recordings found in 2005 on a houseboat that was owned by Keith Godchaux's parents. The tapes had been there since 1971. Godchaux had been given the tapes to listen to shortly after joining the Grateful Dead, so that he could familiarize himself with the band's repertoire in preparation for their next tour. Unlike most Grateful Dead live releases, recordings of these shows did not circulate before their official release.

Dick's Picks Volume 35 includes the only officially released recording of "Empty Pages", a rarely performed song, written and sung by Pigpen, that is not to be confused with the Traffic song of the same name.

Another live Grateful Dead album recorded during this same concert tour is Road Trips Volume 1 Number 3.

== Booklet, liner notes, and newspaper clippings ==
The release includes five sheets of paper stapled together in the middle yielding a 20-page booklet. The front duplicates the cover of the CD and the back features a black-and-white photograph of the band on stage against a background similar to the cover.

Inside the first several pages of the booklet is "A note about Dick's Picks 35" interspersed with some photos of the band members. Following a color photograph of the band on stage spread across two pages is a collage featuring a black-and-white photograph of Jerry Garcia along with three newspaper clippings taking up the two pages in the middle of the booklet.

The second half of the booklet features a two-page collage of three more newspaper clippings, followed by a two-page photomontage of enlarged black-and-white contact prints of band members. A full-sized black-and-white photo of the band on stage is then followed by the last two pages, which list the contents of and credits for the release.

=== Liner notes ===
Appearing immediately inside the booklet are a few pages of liner notes interspersed with a large color photo of Pigpen and followed by a few smaller monochrome photos of the band. The liner notes were written by Dennis McNally and are entitled "The Legend of the houseboat tapes".

McNally's short essay describes how the music on the release was found on a houseboat owned by Keith Godchaux's parents. Found in 2005 by Keith's brother Brian and son Zion while they were cleaning out the houseboat, Jerry Garcia had given the tapes to Keith when he first joined the band, saying "Here, this is our most recent tour. Learn our music."

Writing that "Barely a soundboard-recorded note of that tour's music circulates among Dead Heads" and expressing amazement that "they survived 35 years in a watery environment", McNally concludes that the find proves "that God smiles on the Grateful Dead."

=== Newspaper clippings ===
The six newspaper clippings that span four pages in the middle of the booklet run the gamut in both length and their assessment of the band's shows.

In the first set of three clippings, a positive review by Vern Benson entitled "Grateful Dead give a full, rich measure" accompanies another piece containing a single paragraph announcing a second "dance-concert at the Hollywood Palladium" that was scheduled because the first show had sold out. The third piece is also a simple, albeit slightly longer announcement of a show. The booklet does not give the source for any of these three articles.

The second set of three clippings features a long review from the Chicago Daily News by Jack Hafferkamp, dated August 24, 1971 and entitled "Grateful Dead limp to finish", which despite its title offers a mostly positive assessment of the band's show. Accompanying this review are two other articles from unknown sources. A medium-length piece by Al Rudis entitled "Bad vibes mute Grateful Dead" is not as negative as the title implies, but the short article by Joe Cromwell entitled "Grateful Dead 'dies' in 3-hour show", which appears in the bottom-right corner and is cut off by the edges of the page, appears to be consistently negative.

== Caveat emptor ==
Each volume of Dick's Picks has its own "caveat emptor" label, advising the listener of the sound quality of the recording. The one for volume 35 reads:

"Dick's Picks Volume 35 was mastered directly from the original 1/4 track stereo tapes, which had been stored in less-than-optimal conditions for nearly 35 years. Miraculously, the tapes survived remarkably well, and have been resurrected from the ashes. Some minor sonic anomalies remain, resultant from the ravages of time and the unorthodox storage methods."

== Track listing ==
=== Disc one ===
8/7/71 Golden Hall, San Diego, CA

First set:

1. "Big Railroad Blues" (Noah Lewis, arranged by Grateful Dead) – 4:02
2. "El Paso" (Marty Robbins) – 5:40
3. "Mr. Charlie" (Ron "Pigpen" McKernan, Robert Hunter) – 3:44
4. "Sugaree" (Jerry Garcia, Hunter) – 7:24
5. "Mama Tried" (Merle Haggard) – 3:05
6. "Bertha" (Garcia, Hunter) – 6:43
7. "Big Boss Man" (Al Smith, Luther Dixon) – 5:39
8. "Promised Land" (Chuck Berry) – 3:56
9. "Hard to Handle" (Allen Jones, Al Bell, Otis Redding) – 8:45
10. "Cumberland Blues" (Garcia, Phil Lesh, Hunter) – 5:36
11. "Casey Jones" (Garcia, Hunter) – 5:53

Second set:

1. "Truckin' " (Garcia, Lesh, Bob Weir, Hunter) – 10:08

=== Disc two ===
8/7/71 Golden Hall, San Diego, CA

Second set, continued:

1. "China Cat Sunflower" > (Garcia, Hunter) – 5:28
2. "I Know You Rider" (traditional, arranged by Grateful Dead) – 5:59
3. "Next Time You See Me" (William G. Harvey, Earl Forest) – 4:34
4. "Sugar Magnolia" (Weir, Hunter) – 6:28
5. "Sing Me Back Home" (Haggard) – 10:50
6. "Me & My Uncle" (John Phillips) – 3:39
7. "Not Fade Away" > (Charles Hardin, Norman Petty) – 6:25
8. "Goin' Down the Road Feelin' Bad" > (traditional, arranged by Grateful Dead) – 6:10
9. "Jam" > (Grateful Dead) – 4:08
10. "Johnny B. Goode" (Berry) – 4:31

8/24/71 Auditorium Theatre, Chicago, IL

11. "Uncle John's Band" (Garcia, Hunter) – 7:12
12. "Playing in the Band" (Weir, Mickey Hart, Hunter) – 5:04
13. "Loser" (Garcia, Hunter) – 6:09

=== Disc three ===
8/24/71 Auditorium Theatre, Chicago, IL

1. "It Hurts Me Too" (Elmore James) – 7:48
2. "Cumberland Blues" (Garcia, Lesh, Hunter) – 5:42
3. "Empty Pages" (McKernan) – 5:22
4. "Beat It On Down the Line" (Jesse Fuller) – 3:45
5. "Brown-Eyed Woman" (Garcia, Hunter) – 4:11
6. "St. Stephen" > (Garcia, Lesh, Hunter) – 5:31
7. "Not Fade Away" > (Hardin, Petty) – 4:08
8. "Goin' Down the Road Feelin' Bad" > (traditional, arranged by Grateful Dead) – 8:25
9. "Not Fade Away" reprise (Hardin, Petty) – 3:13
10. "Me and Bobby McGee" (Kris Kristofferson, Fred Foster) – 6:18
11. "Big Boss Man" (Al Smith, Luther Dixon) – 4:30
12. "Brokedown Palace" (Garcia, Hunter) – 5:03

=== Disc four ===
8/24/71 Auditorium Theatre, Chicago, IL

1. "Good Lovin' " (Arthur Resnick, Rudy Clark) – 11:37

8/6/71 Hollywood Palladium, Hollywood, CA (Note: Five other tracks from this concert were later released on the bonus disc of Road Trips Volume 1 Number 3, one of which had previously been released in an audience recording version on Fallout from the Phil Zone)

2. "The Other One" > (Weir, Bill Kreutzmann) – 8:06
3. "Me & My Uncle" > (John Phillips) – 3:14
4. "The Other One" (Weir, Kreutzmann) – 6:25
5. "Deal" (Garcia, Hunter) – 5:48
6. "Sugar Magnolia" (Weir, Hunter) – 7:01
7. "Morning Dew" (Bonnie Dobson, Tim Rose) – 11:29
8. "Turn On Your Love Light" (Joseph Scott, Deadric Malone) – 25:42

== Personnel ==
=== Grateful Dead ===
- Jerry Garcia – lead guitar, vocals
- Bill Kreutzmann – drums
- Phil Lesh – electric bass, vocals
- Ron "Pigpen" McKernan – vocals, harmonica, organ, percussion
- Bob Weir – rhythm guitar, vocals

=== Production ===
- Rex Jackson – recording
- David Lemieux – tape archivist
- Jeffrey Norman – CD mastering
- Eileen Law – archival research
- Robert Minkin – cover art and package design
- Chuck Pulin – photography
- J.C. Overlock – photography
- Emerson-Loew – photography
