= May 1977 (album) =

Live album and box set by Grateful Dead
- Released: June 11, 2013
- Recorded: May 11–17, 1977
- Genre: Rock
- Label: Rhino
- Producer: Grateful Dead

Grateful Dead chronology
Dave's Picks Volume 6 (2013)	May 1977 (2013)	Dave's Picks Volume 7 (2013)

Grateful Dead concert box set chronology
Spring 1990 (2012)	May 1977 (2013)	Spring 1990 (The Other One) (2014)

May 1977 is a live album by the rock band the Grateful Dead. It contains five complete concerts, on 14 CDs. It was recorded at five consecutive shows, from May 11–17, 1977. Packaged as a box set, it includes a booklet with a historical essay and photos from the concerts, along with individual liner notes for each show. Produced as a limited edition of 15,000 numbered copies, it was released on June 11, 2013.

== Concerts ==
The concerts included in May 1977 are:

- May 11, 1977 – St. Paul Civic Center, Saint Paul, Minnesota
- May 12, 1977 – Auditorium Theatre, Chicago
- May 13, 1977 – Auditorium Theatre, Chicago
- May 15, 1977 – St. Louis Arena, St. Louis
- May 17, 1977 – University of Alabama, Tuscaloosa, Alabama

== Critical reception ==
Professional ratings
Review scores
Source	Rating
AllMusic	4/5 stars
Rolling Stone	4/5 stars

On Allmusic, Stephen Thomas Erlewine wrote, "The Dead were a couple months away from releasing Terrapin Station, an album that isn't particularly beloved, but the slickness that subsumed the studio record is a plus on-stage, as they're tighter than ever before. This is a Grateful Dead that is less about sonic exploration than it is about grooving, letting slow, easy rhythms ride out for as long as they can. At times, this does mean that "Fire on the Mountain" goes on for a very long time, taking detours into drum solos, but the comfort and ease here are appealing, along with a precision in the rhythms and solos. What impresses most is the consistency: perhaps there are slight lags in momentum along the way, but each of the five concerts is wonderfully entertaining, the sound of the Dead at something of a laid-back peak."

In Rolling Stone, Will Hermes said, "The Grateful Dead's May 8th, 1977 gig at Cornell University is widely considered the ne plus ultra of Dead bootlegs. This 14-disc set, packed in a psychedelic sarcophagus, documents five gigs from later that month. It puts the consensus-maker in perspective, occasionally rivals it and, flaws notwithstanding, shows a band on a hell of a hot streak. Compared to the hard-tripping Sixties edition, this is comfort-food Dead, long on unhurried jams and raggedy country harmonies sweetened by their only-ever female band member, Donna Jean Godchaux."

== Track listing ==
=== May 11, 1977 – St. Paul Civic Center, Saint Paul, Minnesota ===
Disc one

First set:

1. "Promised Land" (Chuck Berry) – 4:54
2. "They Love Each Other" (Jerry Garcia, Robert Hunter) – 7:38
3. "Big River" (Johnny Cash) – 6:25
4. "Loser" (Garcia, Hunter) – 7:39
5. "Looks Like Rain" (Bob Weir, John Perry Barlow) – 9:18
6. "Ramble On Rose" (Garcia, Hunter) – 7:48
7. "Jack Straw" (Weir, Hunter) – 5:54
8. "Peggy-O" (traditional, arranged by Grateful Dead) – 8:43
9. "El Paso" (Marty Robbins) – 4:44
10. "Deal" (Garcia, Hunter) – 5:49

Disc two

1. "Lazy Lightning" > (Weir, Barlow) – 3:32
2. "Supplication" (Weir, Barlow) –5:20
3. "Sugaree" (Garcia, Hunter) –13:49

Second set:

4. "Samson and Delilah" (traditional, arranged by Grateful Dead) – 7:08
5. "Brown-Eyed Women" (Garcia, Hunter) – 5:28
6. "Estimated Prophet" (Weir, Barlow) – 8:38

Disc three

1. "Scarlet Begonias" > (Garcia, Hunter) – 9:47
2. "Fire on the Mountain" > (Mickey Hart, Hunter) – 11:02
3. "Good Lovin'" (Rudy Clark, Arthur Resnick) – 6:29
4. "Uncle John's Band" > (Garcia, Hunter) – 9:11
5. "Space" > (Garcia, Keith Godchaux, Phil Lesh, Weir) – 5:48
6. "Wharf Rat" > (Garcia, Hunter) – 9:51
7. "Around and Around" (Berry) – 8:48

Encore:

8. "Brokedown Palace" (Garcia, Hunter) – 5:34

=== May 12, 1977 – Auditorium Theatre, Chicago, Illinois ===
Disc one

First set:

1. "Bertha" (Garcia, Hunter) – 7:16
2. "Me and My Uncle" (John Phillips) – 3:04
3. "Tennessee Jed" (Garcia, Hunter) – 9:32
4. "Cassidy" (Weir, Barlow) – 5:05
5. "Peggy-O" (traditional, arranged by Grateful Dead) – 7:52
6. "Jack Straw" (Weir, Hunter) – 5:45
7. "They Love Each Other" (Garcia, Hunter) – 7:47
8. "New Minglewood Blues" (Noah Lewis) – 5:20

Disc two

1. "Mississippi Half-Step Uptown Toodeloo" > (Garcia, Hunter) – 9:54 (Note: Previously released as bonus material on Winterland June 1977: The Complete Recordings)
2. "Dancing in the Street" (Marvin Gaye, Ivy Jo Hunter, William "Mickey" Stevenson) – 14:19

Second set:

3. "Samson and Delilah" (traditional, arranged by Grateful Dead) – 7:07
4. "Brown-Eyed Women" (Garcia, Hunter) – 5:28
5. "Estimated Prophet" (Weir, Barlow) – 9:25
6. "Sunrise" (Donna Jean Godchaux) – 3:46

Disc three

1. "Terrapin Station" > (Garcia, Hunter) – 10:13
2. "Playing in the Band" > (Weir, Hart, Hunter) – 8:36
3. "Drums" > (Hart, Bill Kreutzmann) – 4:06
4. "Not Fade Away" > (Charles Hardin, Norman Petty) – 14:15
5. "Comes a Time" > (Garcia, Hunter) – 10:20
6. "Playing in the Band" (Weir, Hart, Hunter) – 7:00

Encore:

7. "Johnny B. Goode" (Berry) – 4:18

=== May 13, 1977 – Auditorium Theatre, Chicago, Illinois ===
Disc one

First set:

1. "The Music Never Stopped" (Weir, Barlow) – 8:37
2. "Ramble On Rose" (Garcia, Hunter) – 7:33
3. "Cassidy" (Weir, Barlow) – 4:46
4. "Brown-Eyed Women" (Garcia, Hunter) – 5:35
5. "New Minglewood Blues" (Lewis) – 5:06
6. "Friend of the Devil" (Garcia, John Dawson, Hunter) – 8:38
7. "El Paso" (Robbins) – 4:55
8. "Jack-a-Roe" (traditional, arranged by Grateful Dead) – 5:56
9. "Looks Like Rain" (Weir, Barlow) – 8:17
10. "Scarlet Begonias" > (Garcia, Hunter) – 7:05
11. "Fire on the Mountain" (Hart, Hunter) – 13:19

Disc two

Second set:

1. "Samson and Delilah" > (traditional, arranged by Grateful Dead) – 7:24
2. "Bertha" (Garcia, Hunter) – 6:52
3. "Estimated Prophet" > (Weir, Barlow) – 9:51
4. "Drums" > (Hart, Kreutzmann) – 5:47
5. "The Other One" > (Weir, Kreutzmann) – 16:28
6. "Stella Blue" > (Garcia, Hunter) – 11:51
7. "Goin' Down the Road Feeling Bad" > (traditional, arranged by Grateful Dead) – 8:05 (NB: due to tape damage, is from June 8, 1977)
8. "One More Saturday Night" (Weir) – 5:21 (NB: due to tape damage, is from May 28, 1977)

Encore:

9. "U.S. Blues" (Garcia, Hunter) – 5:57

=== May 15, 1977 – St. Louis Arena, St. Louis, Missouri ===
Disc one

First set:

1. "Bertha" > (Garcia, Hunter) – 6:34
2. "Good Lovin'" (Clark, Resnick) – 6:07
3. "Row Jimmy" (Garcia, Hunter) – 10:51
4. "New Minglewood Blues" (traditional, arranged by Grateful Dead) – 5:33
5. "Tennessee Jed" (Garcia, Hunter) – 9:35
6. "Lazy Lightning" > (Weir, Barlow) – 3:34
7. "Supplication" (Weir, Barlow) – 4:42
8. "Jack-a-Roe" (traditional, arranged by Grateful Dead) – 6:24
9. "Passenger" (Lesh, Peter Monk) – 4:31
10. "Brown-Eyed Women" (Garcia, Hunter) – 5:16

Disc two

1. "Dancing in the Street" (Gaye, Ivy Jo Hunter, Stevenson) – 18:49

Second set:

2. "Estimated Prophet" > (Weir, Barlow) – 11:32
3. "Eyes of the World" > (Garcia, Hunter) – 12:48
4. "Drums" > (Hart, Kreutzmann) – 3:13
5. "Samson and Delilah" (traditional, arranged by Grateful Dead) – 7:28
6. "Ship Of Fools" (Garcia, Hunter) – 7:41

Disc three

1. "St. Stephen" > (Garcia, Lesh, Hunter) – 5:28
2. "Iko Iko" > (James "Sugar Boy" Crawford, Barbara Ann Hawkins, Rosa Lee Hawkins, Joan Marie Johnson) – 3:54
3. "Not Fade Away" > (Hardin, Petty) – 9:38
4. "Sugar Magnolia" (Weir, Hunter) – 9:58

Encore:

5. "Uncle John's Band" (Garcia, Hunter) – 9:06

=== May 17, 1977 – University of Alabama, Tuscaloosa, Alabama ===
Disc one

First set:

1. "New Minglewood Blues" (traditional, arranged by Grateful Dead) – 5:46
2. "Mississippi Half-Step Uptown Toodeloo" > (Garcia, Hunter) – 10:28
3. "El Paso" (Robbins) – 4:48
4. "They Love Each Other" (Garcia, Hunter) – 7:42
5. "Jack Straw" (Weir, Hunter) – 5:37
6. "Jack-a-Roe" (traditional, arranged by Grateful Dead) – 5:59 (Note: Previously released on Fallout from the Phil Zone)
7. "Looks Like Rain" (Weir, Barlow) – 8:10
8. "Tennessee Jed" (Garcia, Hunter) – 8:46
9. "Passenger" (Lesh, Monk) – 3:36
10. "High Time" (Garcia, Hunter) – 8:32
11. "Big River" (Cash) – 6:39

Disc two

1. "Sunrise" (D.J. Godchaux) – 4:35
2. "Scarlet Begonias" > (Garcia, Hunter) – 13:02
3. "Fire on the Mountain" (Hart, Hunter) – 13:14

Second set:

4. "Samson and Delilah" > (traditional, arranged by Grateful Dead) – 6:43
5. "Bertha" > (Garcia, Hunter) – 6:16
6. "Good Lovin'" (Clark, Resnick) – 6:02
7. "Brown-Eyed Women" (Garcia, Hunter) – 5:34

Disc three

1. "Estimated Prophet" (Weir, Barlow) – 8:55
2. "Terrapin Station" > (Garcia, Hunter) – 11:23
3. "Playing in the Band" > (Weir, Hart, Hunter) – 12:20
4. "Drums" > (Hart, Kreutzmann) – 4:49
5. "Wharf Rat" > (Garcia, Hunter) – 12:53
6. "Playing in the Band" (Weir, Hart, Hunter) – 6:06

Encore:

7. "Sugar Magnolia" (Weir, Hunter) – 9:15

== Personnel ==
Grateful Dead

- Jerry Garcia – lead guitar, vocals
- Donna Jean Godchaux – vocals
- Keith Godchaux – keyboards
- Mickey Hart – drums
- Bill Kreutzmann – drums
- Phil Lesh – bass guitar
- Bob Weir – rhythm guitar, vocals

Production

- Produced by Grateful Dead
- Produced for release by David Lemieux
- Executive producer: Mark Pinkus
- Associate producer: Doran Tyson
- Mastering: Jeffrey Norman
- Recording: Betty Cantor-Jackson
- Tape transfer, time-base correction, restoration: John K. Chester, Jamie Howarth
- Archival research: Nicholas Merriwether
- Tape research: Michael Wesley Johnson
- Art direction, design: Masaki Koike
- Photography: James R. Anderson, Alexandra May Hunter
- Liner notes: Steve Silberman, Blair Jackson
