= Fallout from the Phil Zone =

Live album by Grateful Dead
- Released: June 17, 1997
- Recorded: September 3, 1967 – March 18, 1995
- Genre: Rock
- Length: 123:47
- Label: Grateful Dead
- Producer: John Cutler; Phil Lesh
- Compiler: Phil Lesh

Grateful Dead chronology
| Dick's Picks Volume 7 (1997) | Fallout from the Phil Zone (1997) | Dick's Picks Volume 8 (1997) |

Professional ratings
Review scores
| Source | Rating |
|---|---|
| Allmusic | 3/5 stars |

Fallout from the Phil Zone is a double compilation album of live recordings by the Grateful Dead handpicked by the band's bassist Phil Lesh. It contains the first Grateful Dead CD releases of "In the Midnight Hour" (clocking in at over 30 minutes) and Bob Dylan's "Visions of Johanna".

The album title has multiple meanings. Since the performances were selected by Phil, they are the ones in his "zone". It also refers to the so-called "Phil Zone", an area directly in front of the bass amps onstage where some fans would stand, feeling the full-impact of the vibrations of Lesh's bass-playing. Lastly, it is a reference to the TV series The Twilight Zone. Lesh stated that, in addition to selecting personal favorites, he wanted to compile rarer material that may not have been released as part of a complete concert.

== Content ==
The album includes a nearly 32-minute-long version of "In The Midnight Hour". Lesh said that he picked it because someone accused them of playing it for 45 minutes. He then tried to find the longest version. The album also includes a high-quality audience recording of "Hard to Handle" from the 8/6/71 concert at the Hollywood Palladium.

== Track listing ==
Disc one
| No. | Title | Writer(s) | Recording venue and date | Length |
|---|---|---|---|---|
| 1. | "Dancin' in the Streets" | Marvin Gaye, Ivy Jo Hunter, William Stevenson | Fillmore West on April 12, 1970 | 11:40 |
| 2. | "New Speedway Boogie" | Robert Hunter, Jerry Garcia | Alfred State College on May 1, 1970 | 8:07 |
| 3. | "Viola Lee Blues" | Noah Lewis | Electric Theatre on April 26, 1969 (Note: More from this date released on Dick's Picks Volume 26) | 19:43 |
| 4. | "Easy Wind" | R. Hunter | Fillmore East on May 15, 1970 (Note: More from this date released on Road Trips Volume 3 Number 3 bonus disc) | 8:04 |
| 5. | "Mason's Children" | R. Hunter, Garcia, Phil Lesh, Bob Weir | Fillmore East on January 2, 1970 (Note: More from this date released on Dave's Picks Volume 30) | 6:07 |
| 6. | "Hard to Handle" | Alvertis Isbell, Allen Jones, Otis Redding | Hollywood Palladium on August 6, 1971 (Note: More from this date released on Dick's Picks Volume 35 and Road Trips Volume 1 Number 3) | 7:34 |
| Total length: | | | | 61:25 |

Disc two
| No. | Title | Writer(s) | Recording venue and date | Length |
|---|---|---|---|---|
| 1. | "The Music Never Stopped" | John Barlow, Weir | Alpine Valley Music Theatre on July 17, 1989 (Note: More from this date appears on Downhill from Here) | 8:55 |
| 2. | "Jack-A-Roe" | trad., arr. Grateful Dead | University of Alabama on May 17, 1977 (Note: This date appears in its entirety on May 1977) | 5:52 |
| 3. | "In the Midnight Hour" | Steve Cropper, Wilson Pickett | The Barn, Rio Nido on September 3, 1967 | 31:49 |
| 4. | "Visions of Johanna" | Bob Dylan | The Spectrum on March 18, 1995 | 10:23 |
| 5. | "Box of Rain" | R. Hunter, Lesh | Alpine Valley Music Theatre on July 19, 1989 (Note: More from this date released on Downhill from Here and extended copies of Built to Last) | 5:11 |
| Total length: | | | | 62:22 |

Notes:

- "Easy Wind" also appears on Road Trips Volume 3 Number 3
- "Mason's Children" also appears on Dave's Picks Volume 30
- "The Music Never Stopped" also appears on Weir Here – The Best of Bob Weir
- "Jack-A-Roe" also appears on May 1977

== Personnel ==
- Jerry Garcia – lead guitar, vocals
- Bob Weir – rhythm guitar, vocals
- Phil Lesh – bass guitar, vocals
- Bill Kreutzmann – drums
- Mickey Hart – drums (except disc 1, track 6 and disc 2, track 3)
- Ron "Pigpen" McKernan – harmonica, organ, vocals (disc 1, tracks 1–2, 4 and 6 and disc 2, track 3)
- Tom Constanten – organ (disc 1, tracks 3 and 5)
- Brent Mydland – keyboards, vocals (disc 2, tracks 1 and 5)
- Keith Godchaux – piano (disc 2, track 2)
- Vince Welnick – keyboards (disc 2, track 4)

=== Production ===
- Phil Lesh – producer, liner notes
- John Cutler – producer
- Dick Latvala – tape archivist
- Jeffrey Norman – engineer
- Joe Gastwirt – mastering
- Alan Trist – publisher
- Shawn Kennedy – cover art
- Rob Cohn – photography
- Amy Finkle – package design

== Charts ==
Album – Billboard

| Year | Chart | Position |
|---|---|---|
| 1997 | The Billboard 200 | 83 |
