= Road Trips Volume 3 Number 2 =

Live album by Grateful Dead
- Released: February 24, 2010
- Recorded: November 15, 1971
- Genre: Rock
- Length: 151:41 bonus disc: 74:43
- Label: Grateful Dead
- Producer: Grateful Dead

Grateful Dead chronology
Road Trips Volume 3 Number 1 (2009)	Road Trips Volume 3 Number 2 (2010)	Crimson White & Indigo (2010)

Alternative cover
- Road Trips Volume 3 Number 2 Bonus Disc

Professional ratings
Review scores
Source	Rating
The Music Box	4/5 stars

Road Trips Volume 3 Number 2 is two-CD live album by the American rock band the Grateful Dead. The tenth in their "Road Trips" series of albums, it was released on February 24, 2010. It contains the complete concert recorded on November 15, 1971, at Austin Memorial Auditorium in Austin, Texas. This concert was the 16th concert after Keith Godchaux joined the Grateful Dead on piano. Ron "Pigpen" McKernan did not perform at this or any of the October and November, 1971 concerts due to poor health.

A third, "bonus" disc was included with early shipments of the album. The bonus disc contains material from the concert held the previous evening, November 14, 1971, at Texas Christian University in Fort Worth, Texas.

Other live Grateful Dead albums recorded during this same concert tour are Dick's Picks Volume 2, Grateful Dead Download Series Volume 3, and Dave's Picks Volume 26.

== Track listing ==
=== Disc One ===
First set:

1. "Truckin' " (Jerry Garcia, Phil Lesh, Bob Weir, Robert Hunter) – 9:21
2. "Bertha" (Garcia, Hunter) – 6:03
3. "Playing in the Band" (Weir, Hunter) – 6:34
4. "Deal" (Garcia, Hunter) – 5:13
5. "Jack Straw" (Weir, Hunter) – 5:32
6. "Loser" (Garcia, Hunter) – 6:41
7. "Beat It on Down the Line" (Jesse Fuller) – 3:41
8. "Dark Star" > (Garcia, Hunter) – 12:49
9. "El Paso" > (Marty Robbins) – 4:55
10. "Dark Star" > (Garcia, Hunter) – 7:45
11. "Casey Jones" (Hunter, Garcia) – 5:52
12. "One More Saturday Night" (Weir) – 5:01

=== Disc Two ===
Second set:

1. "Me and My Uncle" (John Phillips) – 3:35
2. "Ramble On Rose" (Garcia, Hunter) – 6:42
3. "Mexicali Blues" (Weir, John Perry Barlow) – 3:42
4. "Brokedown Palace" (Garcia, Hunter) – 5:51
5. "Me and Bobby McGee" (Kris Kristofferson, Fred Foster) – 6:27
6. "Cumberland Blues" (Garcia, Lesh, Hunter) – 6:35
7. "Sugar Magnolia" (Weir, Hunter) – 7:37
8. "You Win Again" (Hank Williams) – 2:43
9. "Not Fade Away" > (Buddy Holly, Norman Petty) – 5:56
10. "Jam" > – 6:34
11. "Goin' Down the Road Feeling Bad" > (traditional, arranged by Grateful Dead) – 8:28
12. "Not Fade Away" (Holly, Petty) – 3:38

Encore:

13. "Johnny B. Goode" (Chuck Berry) – 4:26

=== Bonus Disc ===
Texas Christian University, Fort Worth, Texas, November 14, 1971:

1. "China Cat Sunflower" > (Garcia, Hunter) – 5:07
2. "I Know You Rider" (traditional, arranged by Grateful Dead) – 6:34
3. "Sugaree" (Garcia, Hunter) – 7:10
4. "Truckin'" > (Garcia, Lesh, Weir, Hunter) – 10:35
5. "Drums" > (Bill Kreutzmann) – 4:24
6. "The Other One" > (Weir, Kreutzmann) – 8:50
7. "Me and My Uncle" > (Phillips) – 3:17
8. "The Other One" > (Weir, Kreutzmann) – 12:15
9. "Wharf Rat" > (Garcia, Hunter) – 9:44
10. "Sugar Magnolia" (Weir, Hunter) – 6:47

== Personnel ==
=== Grateful Dead ===
- Jerry Garcia – lead guitar, vocals
- Keith Godchaux – piano
- Bill Kreutzmann – drums
- Phil Lesh – electric bass, vocals
- Bob Weir – rhythm guitar, vocals

=== Production ===
- Produced by Grateful Dead
- Produced for release by David Lemieux & Blair Jackson
- Recording by Rex Jackson
- CD Mastering by Jeffrey Norman at Mockingbird Mastering, Petaluma, CA
- Cover Art by Scott McDougall
- Back Cover Photo by Bob Seidemann
- Interior Photos by Mary Ann Mayer
- Package Design by Steve Vance

== Sound quality ==
The album was released in HDCD format. This provides enhanced sound quality when played on CD players with HDCD capability, and is fully compatible with regular CD players.

== November 14, 1971 set list ==
The set list for the November 14, 1971 concert at Texas Christian University in Fort Worth, Texas was:

- First set: "Bertha", "Beat It On Down The Line", "China Cat Sunflower"*, "I Know You Rider"*, "El Paso", "Sugaree"*, "Jack Straw", "Big Railroad Blues", "Me & Bobby McGee", "Loser", "Playing in the Band", "Tennessee Jed", "You Win Again", "Mexicali Blues", "Casey Jones", "One More Saturday Night"
- Second set:' "Truckin' "*, "Drums"*, "The Other One"*, "Me & My Uncle"*, "The Other One"*, "Wharf Rat"*, "Sugar Magnolia"*
- Encore: "Johnny B. Goode"

*Included in the Road Trips Volume 3 Number 2 bonus disc
