= Dave's Picks Volume 7 =

Live album by Grateful Dead
- Released: August 1, 2013
- Recorded: April 24, 1978
- Venues: Horton Fieldhouse, Normal, Illinois
- Genre: Rock
- Length: 169:21
- Label: Rhino
- Producer: Grateful Dead

Grateful Dead chronology
May 1977 (2013)	Dave's Picks Volume 7 (2013)	Sunshine Daydream (2013)

Dave's Picks Volume 7 is a three-CD live album by the rock band the Grateful Dead. It contains the complete concert from April 24, 1978, at the Horton Field House, Illinois State University, in Normal, Illinois. It was produced as a limited edition of 13,000 numbered copies, and was released on August 1, 2013.

== Critical reception ==
On AllMusic, Fred Thomas said, "Ending the first leg of their 1978 spring tour, the Grateful Dead pulled into the relatively tiny town of Normal, Illinois in late April of 1978 to deliver one of their legendarily epic concert experiences. Dave's Picks, the archive series that picks up where the seemingly inexhaustible Dick's Picks left off, captures the performance in total of over two hours of recordings."

== Track listing ==
Disc 1
First set:

1. "Promised Land" (Chuck Berry) – 5:14
2. "Ramble On Rose" (Jerry Garcia, Robert Hunter) – 8:07
3. "Me and My Uncle" > (John Phillips) – 3:10
4. "Big River" (Johnny Cash) – 6:21
5. "Friend of the Devil" (Garcia, Hunter) – 9:33
6. "Cassidy" (Bob Weir, John Perry Barlow) – 5:38
7. "Brown-Eyed Women" (Garcia, Hunter) – 5:57
8. "Passenger" (Phil Lesh, Peter Monk) – 5:45
9. "It Must Have Been the Roses" (Garcia, Hunter) – 8:07
10. "The Music Never Stopped" (Weir, Barlow) – 8:51

Disc 2
Second set:

1. "Scarlet Begonias" > (Garcia, Hunter) – 12:55
2. "Fire on the Mountain" > (Mickey Hart, Hunter) – 11:08
3. "Good Lovin'" (Rudy Clark, Arthur Resnick) – 7:06

Disc 3

1. "Terrapin Station" > (Garcia, Hunter) – 10:51
2. "Rhythm Devils" > (Hart, Bill Kreutzmann) – 13:53
3. "Space" > (Garcia, Keith Godchaux, Lesh, Weir) – 6:41
4. "Not Fade Away" > (Buddy Holly, Norman Petty) – 11:19
5. "Black Peter" > (Garcia, Hunter) – 11:47
6. "Around and Around" (Berry) – 9:11

Encore:

7. "Werewolves of London" (LeRoy Marinell, Waddy Wachtel, Warren Zevon) – 7:46

== Personnel ==
Grateful Dead

- Jerry Garcia – lead guitar, vocals
- Donna Jean Godchaux – vocals
- Keith Godchaux – keyboards
- Mickey Hart – drums and percussion
- Bill Kreutzmann – drums and percussion
- Phil Lesh – bass guitar, vocals
- Bob Weir – rhythm guitar, vocals

Production

- Produced by Grateful Dead
- Produced for release by David Lemieux
- CD mastering: Jeffrey Norman
- Cover art: Timothy Truman
- Recorded by Betty Cantor-Jackson
- Tape research: Michael Wesley Johnson
