= Winterland June 1977: The Complete Recordings =

Live album and box set by Grateful Dead
- Released: October 1, 2009
- Recorded: June 7 – 9, 1977
- Genres: Rock, psychedelic rock, jam band
- Label: Grateful Dead
- Producer: Grateful Dead

Grateful Dead chronology
Road Trips Volume 2 Number 4 (2009)	Winterland June 1977: The Complete Recordings (2009)	Road Trips Volume 3 Number 1 (2009)

Grateful Dead concert box set chronology
Winterland 1973: The Complete Recordings (2008)	Winterland June 1977: The Complete Recordings (2009)	Formerly the Warlocks (2010)

Professional ratings
Review scores
Source	Rating
Allmusic	4/5 stars
All About Jazz	(favorable)
Rolling Stone	4/5 stars

Winterland June 1977: The Complete Recordings is a 9 CD live album by the American rock band the Grateful Dead. It contains three complete concerts. It was recorded on June 7, 8, and 9, 1977, at the Winterland Ballroom in San Francisco, California. The album was released on October 1, 2009.

A tenth, "bonus" disc was included with early shipments of the album. The bonus disc contains material from the May 12, 1977 concert at the Auditorium Theatre in Chicago, Illinois, all of which was later released, with the entire performance, on the May 1977 box set.

Winterland June 1977: The Complete Recordings was the third Grateful Dead album to contain an entire "run" of concerts. The first was Fillmore West 1969: The Complete Recordings, which was released in 2005. The second was Winterland 1973: The Complete Recordings, released in 2008.

== Recording and mastering ==
The album was released in HDCD format. This provides enhanced sound quality when played on CD players with HDCD capability, and is fully compatible with regular CD players.

== Track listing ==
=== Disc 1 ===
June 7, 1977 — First set:

1. "Bertha" (Jerry Garcia, Robert Hunter) – 7:34
2. "Jack Straw" (Bob Weir, Hunter) – 6:19
3. "Tennessee Jed" (Garcia, Hunter) – 9:25
4. "Looks Like Rain" (Weir, John Perry Barlow) – 9:05
5. "Peggy-O" (Traditional) – 10:13
6. "Funiculi Funicula" (Luigi Denza) – 3:06
7. "El Paso" (Marty Robbins) – 4:52
8. "Friend of the Devil" (Garcia, John Dawson, Hunter) – 8:42
9. "The Music Never Stopped" (Weir, Barlow) – 7:20

=== Disc 2 ===
June 7, 1977 — Second set:

1. "Scarlet Begonias" > (Garcia, Hunter) – 10:11
2. "Fire on the Mountain" > (Mickey Hart, Hunter) – 9:03
3. "Good Lovin'" > (Artie Resnick, Rudy Clark) – 7:29
4. "Candyman" (Garcia, Hunter) – 7:24
5. "Estimated Prophet" > (Weir, Barlow) – 8:48
6. "He's Gone" > (Garcia, Hunter) – 14:47
7. "Drums" > (Bill Kreutzmann, Hart) – 3:01

=== Disc 3 ===
1. "Samson and Delilah" (Traditional) – 9:30
2. "Terrapin Station" > (Garcia, Hunter) – 10:51
3. "(Walk Me Out in the) Morning Dew" > (Bonnie Dobson, Tim Rose) – 13:15
4. "Around and Around" (Chuck Berry) – 9:14

June 7, 1977 — Encore:

5. "Uncle John's Band (Garcia, Hunter) – 11:55
6. "U.S. Blues" (Garcia, Hunter) – 6:07

=== Disc 4 ===
June 8, 1977 — First set:

1. "New Minglewood Blues" (Noah Lewis) – 6:22
2. "Sugaree" (Garcia, Hunter) – 16:46
3. "Mexicali Blues" (Weir, Barlow) – 3:55
4. "Row Jimmy" (Garcia, Hunter) – 10:34
5. "Passenger" (Phil Lesh, Peter Monk) – 3:52
6. "Sunrise" (Donna Godchaux) – 4:14
7. "Brown-Eyed Women" (Garcia, Hunter) – 5:47
8. "It's All Over Now" (Bobby Womack, Shirley Womack) – 8:57
9. "Jack-A-Roe" (Traditional) – 7:19
10. "Lazy Lightnin' " > (Weir, Barlow) – 3:24
11. "Supplication" (Weir, Barlow) – 5:46

=== Disc 5 ===
June 8, 1977 — Second set:

1. "Bertha" > (Garcia, Hunter) – 6:53
2. "Good Lovin'" (Clarke, Resnick) – 6:04
3. "Ramble On Rose" (Garcia, Hunter) – 8:08
4. "Estimated Prophet" > (Weir, Barlow) – 9:42
5. "Eyes of the World" > (Garcia, Hunter) – 19:20
6. "Drums" > (Kreutzmann, Hart) – 4:05

=== Disc 6 ===
1. "The Other One" > (Grateful Dead) – 14:32
2. "Wharf Rat" > (Garcia, Hunter) – 11:16
3. "Not Fade Away" > (Buddy Holly, Norman Petty) – 13:44
4. "Goin' Down the Road Feeling Bad" > (Traditional) – 8:06
5. "Johnny B. Goode" (Berry) – 4:39

June 8, 1977 — Encore:

6. "Brokedown Palace" (Garcia, Hunter) – 7:53

=== Disc 7 ===
June 9, 1977 — First set:

1. "Mississippi Half-Step Uptown Toodeloo" (Garcia, Hunter) – 11:27
2. "Jack Straw" (Weir, Hunter) – 6:06
3. "They Love Each Other" (Garcia, Hunter) – 7:33
4. "Cassidy" (Weir, Barlow) – 5:41
5. "Sunrise" (Godchaux) – 4:14
6. "Deal" (Garcia, Hunter) – 5:48
7. "Looks Like Rain" (Weir, Barlow) – 9:10
8. "Loser" (Garcia, Hunter) – 7:40
9. "The Music Never Stopped" (Weir, Barlow) – 7:44

=== Disc 8 ===
June 9, 1977 — Second set:

1. "Samson and Delilah" (Traditional) – 7:39
2. "Funiculì Funiculà" (Turco, Denza) – 2:25
3. "Help on the Way" > (Garcia, Hunter) – 5:09
4. "Slipknot!" > (Garcia, Hunter) – 9:00
5. "Franklin's Tower" (Garcia, Hunter, Kreutzmann) – 17:29

=== Disc 9 ===
1. "Estimated Prophet" > (Weir, Barlow) – 11:36
2. "St. Stephen" > (Garcia, Lesh, Hunter) – 5:30
3. "Not Fade Away" > (Holly, Petty) – 6:29
4. "Drums" > (Kreutzmann, Hart) – 4:22
5. "St. Stephen" > (Garcia, Lesh, Hunter) – 0:51
6. "Terrapin Station" > (Garcia, Hunter) – 11:10
7. "Sugar Magnolia" (Weir, Hunter) – 9:25

June 9, 1977 — Encore:

8. "U.S. Blues" (Garcia, Hunter) – 6:08
9. "One More Saturday Night" (Weir) – 5:18

=== Bonus Disc ===
Selections from May 12, 1977, Auditorium Theatre, Chicago, Illinois: (Note: Entire show later released as part of the album May 1977)

1. "Mississippi Half-Step Uptown Toodeloo" > (Garcia, Hunter) – 9:59
2. "Dancing in the Street" (Marvin Gaye, Ivy Jo Hunter, William "Mickey" Stevenson) – 13:56
3. "Terrapin Station" > (Garcia, Hunter) – 10:25
4. "Playing in the Band" > (Weir, Hart, Hunter) – 8:18
5. "Drums" > (Kreutzmann, Hart) – 4:09
6. "Not Fade Away" > (Holly, Petty) – 14:11
7. "Comes a Time" > (Garcia, Hunter) – 10:19
8. "Playing in the Band" (Weir, Hart, Hunter) – 6:50

== Personnel ==
=== Grateful Dead ===
- Jerry Garcia – lead guitar, vocals
- Donna Godchaux – vocals
- Keith Godchaux – keyboards
- Mickey Hart - drums
- Bill Kreutzmann – drums
- Phil Lesh – electric bass
- Bob Weir – rhythm guitar, vocals

=== Production ===
- Box set produced by David Lemieux
- Recording by Betty Cantor-Jackson
- CD mastering by Jeffrey Norman at Garage Audio Mastering, Petaluma, CA
- Original 2-track master speed and time base correction by Jamie Howarth, Plangent Processes
- Cover art by Emek
- Uncle Sam art by Gary Gutierrez
- Photography by Bruce Polonsky and Ed Perlstein
- Booklet essay by David Fricke
- Art direction and design by Steve Vance
- Special thanks to Mike Johnson, John Chester, Christine Bunting

== May 12, 1977 set list ==
The set list for the May 12, 1977 concert at the Chicago Auditorium Theater was:

- First set: "Bertha", "Me and My Uncle", "Tennessee Jed", "Cassidy", "Peggy-O", "Jack Straw", "They Love Each Other", "New Minglewood Blues", "Mississippi Half-Step Uptown Toodeloo"*, "Dancin' in the Streets"*
- Second set: "Samson & Delilah", "Brown-Eyed Women", "Estimated Prophet", "Sunrise", "Terrapin Station"*, "Playing in the Band"*, "Drums"*, "Not Fade Away"*, "Comes A Time"*, "Playing in the Band"*
- Encore: "Johnny B. Goode"

* Included in the Winterland June 1977 bonus disc
