= The Young Rascals (album) =

Studio album by the Young Rascals
- Released: April 5, 1966
- Recorded: September 16, 1965 – March 16, 1966
- Studio: Atlantic and A&R, New York
- Genre: Blue-eyed soul, garage rock
- Length: 35:59
- Label: Atlantic
- Producer: The Young Rascals

The Young Rascals chronology
The Young Rascals (1966)	Collections (1966)

Singles from The Young Rascals
- 1. "I Ain't Gonna Eat Out My Heart Anymore" / "Slow Down" Released: November 16, 1965; 2. "Good Lovin'" / "Mustang Sally" Released: February 15, 1966

The Young Rascals is the debut album by the American rock band the Young Rascals. The album was released on April 5, 1966, and rose to No. 15 on the Billboard Top LPs chart and No. 10 in Cashbox.

Most of the songs on The Young Rascals were covers of songs written or originally performed by other artists, with only "Do You Feel It" authored by the band. However, "Good Lovin'", "Mustang Sally" and "In the Midnight Hour" would all become signature songs for the Rascals, with "Good Lovin'" b/w "Mustang Sally" becoming their first No. 1 single. The album also contained their charting debut single from late 1965, "I Ain't Gonna Eat Out My Heart Anymore".

== Reception ==
Professional ratings
Review scores
Source	Rating
AllMusic	4.5/5 stars

In his review for AllMusic, music critic Bruce Eder praised the album and called it a "rare example of a genuinely great album that got heard and played, and sold and sold." The album was certified Gold by the Recording Industry Association of America.

== Track listing ==
Track lengths and songwriting credits adapted from the 2024 box set It's Wonderful: The Complete Atlantic Studio Recordings.

Side one

1. "Slow Down" (Larry Williams) – 3:12
2. "Baby Let's Wait" (Pam Sawyer, Lori Burton) – 3:19
3. "Just a Little" (Ron Elliott, Bob Durand) – 2:59
4. "I Believe" (Ervin Drake, Irvin Graham, Jimmy Shirl, Al Stillman) – 3:58
5. "Do You Feel It" (Felix Cavaliere, Gene Cornish) – 3:16

Side two

1. "Good Lovin'" (Artie Resnick, Rudy Clark) – 2:29
2. "Like a Rolling Stone" (Bob Dylan) – 6:06
3. "Mustang Sally" (Mack Rice) – 3:58
4. "I Ain't Gonna Eat Out My Heart Anymore" (Pam Sawyer, Lori Burton) – 2:41
5. "In the Midnight Hour" (Steve Cropper, Wilson Pickett) – 4:01

== Personnel ==
Personnel according to the 1988 re-issue of The Young Rascals, unless otherwise noted.

The Young Rascals

- Eddie Brigati – percussion; lead vocals ("Baby Let's Wait", "I Believe" and "I Ain't Gonna Eat Out My Heart Anymore"), production
- Felix Cavaliere – organ; lead vocals ("Slow Down", "Do You Feel It", "Good Lovin'", "Mustang Sally" and "In the Midnight Hour"), production
- Gene Cornish – guitar; lead vocals ("Just a Little" and "Like a Rolling Stone"), production
- Dino Danelli – drums, production

Other personnel

- Tom Dowd – recording supervisor ("Slow Down", "Good Lovin'", "Mustang Sally" and "I Ain't Gonna Eat Out My Heart Anymore"), recording engineer (Atlantic Studios)
- Arif Mardin – recording supervisor ("Slow Down", "Good Lovin'", "Like a Rolling Stone", "Mustang Sally" and "I Ain't Gonna Eat Out My Heart Anymore")
- Roy Cicala – recording engineer (A&R Studios)
- Phil Iehle – recording engineer (Atlantic Studios)
- Jerry Schatzberg – cover photography
- Loring Eutemey – cover design

== Charts ==
Weekly chart performance
Chart (1966)	Peak position
US Billboard Top LP's	15
US Cash Box Top 100 Albums	10
US Record World 100 Top LP's	9

Year-end chart performance
Chart (1966)	Peak position
US Billboard Top LP's	76
US Cash Box Top 100 Albums	45

== Certifications ==
Certifications for The Young Rascals
Region	Certification	Certified units/sales
United States (RIAA)	Gold	500,000^{^}
^{^} Shipments figures based on certification alone.
