= Grateful Dead: Downhill from Here =

Downhill from Here
- Downhill from Here DVD cover
- Directed by: Len Dell'Amico
- Produced by: John Cutler; Phil Lesh
- Starring: The Grateful Dead
- Edited by: Bill Weber; Jeffrey Norman
- Distributed by: Monterey Home Video
- Release date: October 7, 1997
- Running time: 150 minutes
- Country: United States
- Language: English

Downhill from Here is a concert video by the rock band the Grateful Dead. It was recorded at Alpine Valley Music Theatre, near East Troy, Wisconsin, in July 1989. It was produced by Len Dell'Amico and Grateful Dead Productions. It was released by Monterey Home Video on VHS in 1997 and on DVD in 1999, and by Pioneer Entertainment on LaserDisc in 1997. The video has a running time of two and a half hours.

Most of Downhill From Here was recorded on July 17, 1989. However, the last four songs of the first set – "Row Jimmy", "When I Paint My Masterpiece", "When Push Comes to Shove", and "The Music Never Stopped" – have been replaced with the last three songs of the first set from July 19 – "West L.A. Fadeaway", "Desolation Row", and "Deal".

"The Music Never Stopped" from July 17 is included in the albums Weir Here and Fallout from the Phil Zone. The latter also includes "Box of Rain" from July 19, and "Foolish Heart" from that date is a bonus track on Built to Last.

== Track listing ==
First set

- "Let the Good Times Roll" (Cooke) →
- "Feel Like a Stranger" (Weir, Barlow)
- "Built To Last" (Garcia, Hunter)
- "Me and My Uncle" (Phillips) →
- "Cumberland Blues" (Garcia, Lesh, Hunter)
- "It's All Over Now" (B. Womack, S. Womack)

July 19, 1989 – first set:

- "West L.A. Fadeaway" (Garcia, Hunter)
- "Desolation Row" (Dylan) →
- "Deal" (Garcia, Hunter)

Second set

- "China Cat Sunflower" (Garcia, Hunter) →
- "I Know You Rider" (traditional, arranged by Grateful Dead)
- "Playing in the Band" (Weir, Hart, Hunter) →
- "Uncle John's Band" (Garcia, Hunter) →
- "Standing on the Moon" (Garcia, Hunter) →
- "Drums" (Kreutzmann, Hart) →
- "Space" (Garcia, Weir, Lesh, Mydland) →
- "The Wheel" (Garcia, Kreutzmann, Hunter) →
- "Gimme Some Lovin'" (S. Winwood, M. Winwood, Davis) →
- "Goin' Down the Road Feelin' Bad" (traditional, arranged by Grateful Dead) →
- "Not Fade Away" (Hardin, Petty)
- "We Bid You Goodnight" (traditional, arranged by Grateful Dead)

Encore

- "Johnny B. Goode" (Berry)

== Credits ==
Grateful Dead

- Jerry Garcia – guitar
- Mickey Hart – drums, percussion
- Bill Kreutzmann – drums, percussion
- Phil Lesh – bass
- Brent Mydland – keyboards
- Bob Weir – guitar

Production

- Len Dell'Amico – director, producer
- John Cutler and Phil Lesh – sound production, mixing
- Candace Brightman – lighting director
- Dan Healy – concert sound
- Bob Bralove – sound design and programming
- Allen Newman – line producer
- Bill Weber – video post editing
- Jeffrey Norman – audio post editing
- Terry Donahue – technical direction
- Billy Steinberg – senior video
