= Dick's Picks Volume 8 =

Live album by Grateful Dead
- Released: June 14, 1997
- Recorded: May 2, 1970
- Genres: Rock, jam, psychedelic rock
- Length: 176:38
- Label: Grateful Dead

Grateful Dead chronology
Fallout from the Phil Zone (1997)	Dick's Picks Volume 8 (1997)	Terrapin Station (Limited Edition) (1997)

Professional ratings
Review scores
Source	Rating
Allmusic	4.5/5 stars
The Music Box	5/5 stars
Rolling Stone	5/5 stars

Dick's Picks Volume 8 is the eighth live album in the Dick's Picks series of releases by the Grateful Dead. It was recorded on May 2, 1970, at Harpur College (now Binghamton University) in Binghamton, New York. It was released in mid-1997.

The album contains the entire concert, except for one song — "Cold Rain and Snow", which was played between "Good Lovin' " and "It's a Man's Man's Man's World". The first two verses of "St. Stephen" are also missing. The first set of the concert was acoustic, and was recorded in stereo. The second and third sets were electric, and were recorded in monaural.

In a 1993 poll of Grateful Dead tape traders, the 5/2/70 show was ranked #6 on the list of all-time favorite Dead concert tapes.

== Caveat emptor ==
Each volume of Dick's Picks has its own "caveat emptor" label, advising the listener of the sound quality of the recording. The label for volume 8 reads:

These compact discs were mastered directly from the original half track 7 1/2 ips analog tapes recorded at this show. The acoustic set was recorded in stereo. The electric sets are monaural. While the reason for this remains a mystery, spurious electrical activity is suspected.

== Enclosure ==
The release includes a single sheet folded in half yielding a four-page booklet. The first page repeats the cover art from the packaging. The second page provides the track list and credits. The third page reprints a stream-of-consciousness-style review of the show by Richard Walinsky originally published in the May 5, 1970, issue of the SUNY Binghamton Colonial News . The fourth page shows a small photo of the band.

== Track listing ==
Disc one
First set:

1. "Don't Ease Me In" (traditional) – 4:38
2. "I Know You Rider" (traditional) – 7:51
3. "Friend of the Devil" (Jerry Garcia, John Dawson, Robert Hunter) – 5:57
4. "Dire Wolf" (Garcia, Hunter) – 4:56
5. "Beat It on Down the Line" (Jesse Fuller) – 3:13 →
6. "Black Peter" (Garcia, Hunter) – 7:02
7. "Candyman" (Garcia, Hunter) – 1:43 →
8. "Cumberland Blues" (Garcia, Hunter, Phil Lesh) – 5:47
9. "Deep Elem Blues" (traditional) – 7:30
10. "Cold Jordan" (traditional) – 2:35
11. "Uncle John's Band" (Garcia, Hunter) – 6:28

Disc two
Second set:

1. "St. Stephen" (Garcia, Hunter, Lesh) – 3:23 →
2. "Cryptical Envelopment" (Garcia) – 1:54 →
3. "Drums" (Hart, Bill Kreutzmann) – 3:28 →
4. "The Other One" (Bob Weir, Kreutzmann) – 13:56 →
5. "Cryptical Envelopment" (Garcia) – 8:59 →
6. "Cosmic Charlie" (Garcia, Hunter) – 7:23
7. "Casey Jones" (Garcia, Hunter) – 4:45
8. "Good Lovin' " (Arthur Resnick, Rudy Clark) – 15:10

Disc three
Second set, continued:

1. "It's a Man's World" (James Brown, Betty Jean Newsome) – 10:04
2. "Dancing in the Streets" (William "Mickey" Stevenson, Marvin Gaye, Ivy Jo Hunter) – 15:42

Third set:

3. "Morning Dew" (Bonnie Dobson, Tim Rose) – 12:40
4. "Viola Lee Blues" (Noah Lewis) – 16:35 →
5. "We Bid You Goodnight" (traditional) – 4:59

== Personnel ==
=== Grateful Dead ===
- Jerry Garcia – acoustic guitar (first set, except "Cumberland Blues"), lead electric guitar ("Cumberland Blues", second & third sets), vocals
- Mickey Hart – drums, percussion
- Bill Kreutzmann – drums, percussion
- Phil Lesh – electric bass, vocals
- Ron "Pigpen" McKernan – organ, harmonica, vocals
- Bob Weir – acoustic guitar (first set), rhythm electric guitar (second & third sets), vocals

=== Additional musicians ===
- John "Marmaduke" Dawson – vocals on "Cold Jordan"
- David Nelson – acoustic guitar on "Cumberland Blues", mandolin on "Cold Jordan"

=== Production ===
- Bob Matthews – recording
- Dick Latvala – tape archivist
- Jeffrey Norman – CD mastering
- John Cutler – ferromagnetist
- Gecko Graphics – design
- Morris Zwerman – band photo
- Richard Walinsky – CD liner notes
