= Winterland 1973: The Complete Recordings =

Live album and box set by Grateful Dead
- Released: April 1, 2008
- Recorded: November 9 – 11, 1973
- Genres: Rock, psychedelic rock, jam band
- Length: 9:30:04 bonus disc: 77:32
- Label: Grateful Dead
- Producer: Grateful Dead

Grateful Dead chronology
Road Trips Volume 1 Number 2 (2008)	Winterland 1973: The Complete Recordings (2008)	Road Trips Volume 1 Number 3 (2008)

Grateful Dead concert box set chronology
Fillmore West 1969: The Complete Recordings (2005)	Winterland 1973: The Complete Recordings (2008)	Winterland June 1977: The Complete Recordings (2009)

Alternative cover
- Winterland 1973: The Complete Recordings Bonus Disc

Professional ratings
Review scores
Source	Rating
Allmusic	4.5/5 stars
Rolling Stone	4/5 stars
The Best of Website	(A+)

Winterland 1973: The Complete Recordings is a 9 CD live album by the American rock band the Grateful Dead. It contains three complete concerts, missing only the encore of the first concert. It was recorded on November 9, 10, and 11, 1973, at the Winterland Ballroom in San Francisco, California. The album was released on April 1, 2008.

A tenth, "bonus" disc was included with early shipments of the album. The bonus disc contains material from the December 4, 1973 concert at the Cincinnati Gardens in Cincinnati, Ohio.

Winterland 1973: The Complete Recordings was the second Grateful Dead album to contain an entire "run" of concerts. The first was Fillmore West 1969: The Complete Recordings, which was released in 2005.

== Recording and mastering ==
The Winterland 1973 concerts were recorded on two-channel analog tapes, using a Nagra IV reel-to-reel tape recorder. As part of mastering the recordings for CD, the analog recordings were transferred to a digital format. They were then edited using a digital signal processing system called Clarity, developed by Plangent Processes, which fixes sonic problems created by minor variations in the tape speed of the original tape recorder. The resulting recording has been corrected for pitch and tempo, and wow and flutter have been eliminated.

The album was released in HDCD format, which provides enhanced sound quality when played on CD players with HDCD capability and CD quality sound when played on regular CD players.

== Track listing ==
=== Disc 1 ===
November 9, 1973 — First set:

1. "Promised Land" (Chuck Berry) – 3:21
2. "Brown-Eyed Woman" (Jerry Garcia, Robert Hunter) – 5:08
3. "Me and Bobby McGee" (Kris Kristofferson, Fred Foster) – 5:59
4. "They Love Each Other" (Garcia, Hunter) - 5:42
5. "Black-Throated Wind" (Bob Weir, John Perry Barlow) – 7:08
6. "Don’t Ease Me In" (traditional, arranged by Grateful Dead) – 4:37
7. "Mexicali Blues" (Weir, Barlow) – 3:44
8. "Row Jimmy" (Garcia, Hunter) – 9:03
9. "The Race Is On" (Don Rollins) – 3:57
10. "China Cat Sunflower" > (Garcia, Hunter) – 7:35
11. "I Know You Rider" (traditional, arranged by Grateful Dead) – 5:27

=== Disc 2 ===
1. "Playing in the Band" (Weir, Mickey Hart, Hunter) – 20:53

November 9, 1973 — Second set:

2. "Here Comes Sunshine" (Garcia, Hunter) – 11:52
3. "Me and My Uncle" (John Phillips) – 3:44
4. "To Lay Me Down" (Garcia, Hunter) – 8:11
5. "Big River" (Johnny Cash) – 5:29
6. "Mississippi Half-Step Uptown Toodeloo" (Garcia, Hunter) – 8:30
7. "Greatest Story Ever Told" > (Weir, Hunter) – 5:10
8. "Bertha" (Garcia, Hunter) – 6:12

=== Disc 3 ===
1. "Weather Report Suite" > (Weir, Eric Andersen, Barlow) – 15:38
2. "Eyes of the World" > (Garcia, Hunter) – 16:43
3. "China Doll" (Garcia, Hunter) – 5:57
4. "Around and Around" > (Berry) – 5:05
5. "Goin’ Down The Road Feeling Bad" > (traditional, arranged by Grateful Dead) – 8:01
6. "Johnny B. Goode" (Berry) – 4:25

=== Disc 4 ===
November 10, 1973 — First set:

1. "Bertha" (Garcia, Hunter) – 7:11
2. "Jack Straw" (Weir, Hunter) – 5:15
3. "Loser" (Garcia, Hunter) – 6:40
4. "Looks Like Rain" (Weir, Barlow) – 7:50
5. "Deal" (Garcia, Hunter) – 4:40
6. "Mexicali Blues" (Weir, Barlow) – 3:42
7. "Tennessee Jed" (Garcia, Hunter) – 8:39
8. "El Paso" (Marty Robbins) – 4:54
9. "Brokedown Palace" (Garcia, Hunter) – 6:12
10. "Beat It On Down the Line" (Jesse Fuller) – 3:51
11. "Row Jimmy" (Garcia, Hunter) – 8:51

=== Disc 5 ===
1. "Weather Report Suite" (Weir, Andersen, Barlow) – 18:26

November 10, 1973 — Second set:

2. "Playing In The Band" > (Weir, Hart, Hunter) – 11:59
3. "Uncle John's Band" > (Garcia, Hunter) – 9:39
4. "Morning Dew" > (Bonnie Dobson, Tim Rose) – 12:24
5. "Uncle John’s Band" > (Garcia, Hunter) – 1:50
6. "Playing In The Band" (Weir, Hart, Hunter) – 7:38

=== Disc 6 ===
1. "Big River" (Cash) – 5:12
2. "Stella Blue" (Garcia, Hunter) – 8:19
3. "Truckin'" > (Garcia, Phil Lesh, Weir, Hunter) – 12:18
4. "Wharf Rat" > (Garcia, Hunter) – 8:43
5. "Sugar Magnolia" (Weir, Hunter) – 10:39

November 10, 1973 — Encore:

6. "One More Saturday Night" (Weir) – 5:28
7. "Casey Jones" (Garcia, Hunter) – 7:05

=== Disc 7 ===
November 11, 1973 — First set:

1. "Promised Land" > (Berry) – 3:42
2. "Bertha" > (Garcia, Hunter) – 6:04
3. "Greatest Story Ever Told" (Weir, Hunter) – 6:07
4. "Sugaree" (Garcia, Hunter) – 7:56
5. "Black-Throated Wind" (Weir, Barlow) – 7:47
6. "To Lay Me Down" (Garcia, Hunter) – 8:28
7. "El Paso" (Robbins) – 4:45
8. "Ramble On Rose" (Garcia, Hunter) – 7:04
9. "Me and Bobby McGee" (Kristofferson, Foster) – 5:56

=== Disc 8 ===
1. "China Cat Sunflower" > (Garcia, Hunter) – 9:27
2. "I Know You Rider" (traditional, arranged by Grateful Dead) – 6:04
3. "Me and My Uncle" (Phillips) – 3:34
4. "Loose Lucy" (Garcia, Hunter) – 7:52
5. "Weather Report Suite" (Weir, Andersen, Barlow) – 15:07

November 11, 1973 — Second set:

6. "Mississippi Half-Step Uptown Toodeloo" (Garcia, Hunter) – 8:26
7. "Big River" (Cash) – 7:05

=== Disc 9 ===
1. "Dark Star" > (Garcia, Lesh, Weir, Bill Kreutzmann, Keith Godchaux, Hunter) – 35:41
2. "Eyes Of The World" > (Garcia, Hunter) – 13:36
3. "China Doll" (Garcia, Hunter) – 5:40
4. "Sugar Magnolia" (Weir, Hunter) – 10:19

November 11, 1973 — Encore:

5. "Uncle John’s Band" (Garcia, Hunter) – 7:32
6. "Johnny B. Goode" > (Berry) – 3:56
7. "And We Bid You Goodnight" (traditional, arranged by Grateful Dead) – 3:11

=== Bonus Disc ===
December 4, 1973, Cincinnati Gardens, Cincinnati, Ohio:

1. "China Cat Sunflower" > (Garcia, Hunter) – 7:58
2. "I Know You Rider" (traditional, arranged by Grateful Dead) – 5:57
3. "Truckin' " > (Garcia, Lesh, Weir, Hunter) – 8:48
4. "Stella Blue" (Garcia, Hunter) – 8:15
5. "Eyes Of The World" > (Garcia, Hunter) – 13:38
6. "Space" > (Garcia, Lesh, Weir, Kreutzmann, Godchaux) – 9:36
7. "Sugar Magnolia" > (Weir, Hunter) – 6:17
8. "Goin' Down The Road Feeling Bad" > (traditional, arranged by Grateful Dead) – 9:45
9. "Casey Jones" (Garcia, Hunter) – 7:17

== Personnel ==
=== Grateful Dead ===
- Jerry Garcia – lead guitar, vocals
- Donna Godchaux – vocals
- Keith Godchaux – keyboards
- Bill Kreutzmann – drums
- Phil Lesh – electric bass
- Bob Weir – rhythm guitar, vocals

=== Production ===
- Produced by Grateful Dead
- Box set produced by David Lemieux and Jeffrey Norman
- Recording by Bill Candelario
- CD mastering by Jeffrey Norman at Garage Audio, Petaluma, California
- Restoration by Jamie Howarth, Plangent Processes
- Archival research by Eileen Law / Grateful Dead Archives
- Cover art by Emek
- Art direction and design by Steve Vance
- Photography by Bruce Polonsky, Mary Ann Mayer, and Gary Manasse
- Set lists by David Gans
- Special thanks to Hale Milgrim, Nancy Nichols, and Paul Nichols
- Dedicated to the memory of Don Pearson
- Liner notes by Dennis McNally

== December 4, 1973 set list ==
The set list for the December 4, 1973 concert at the Cincinnati Gardens was:

- First set: "Johnny B. Goode", "Sugaree", "Me and My Uncle", "China Cat Sunflower"*, "I Know You Rider"*, "El Paso", "Deal", "Big River", "Tennessee Jed", "Truckin'"*, "Stella Blue"*, "Around and Around"
- Second set: "Eyes of the World"*, "Space"*, "Sugar Magnolia"*, "Going Down the Road Feelin' Bad"*, "Casey Jones"*
- Encore: "One More Saturday Night"

* Included in the Winterland '73 bonus disc
