= Grateful Dead Download Series Volume 3 =

Live album by Grateful Dead
- Released: July 5, 2005
- Recorded: October 26, 1971
- Length: 140:42
- Label: Grateful Dead Productions

Grateful Dead chronology
Dick's Picks Volume 35 (2005)	Grateful Dead; Download Series Volume 3 (2005)	Truckin' Up to Buffalo (2005)

Download Series Volume 3 is a live album by the rock band Grateful Dead. It was recorded on October 26, 1971, at the Palestra in Rochester, New York, and released as a digital download on July 5, 2005.

This marks the fifth show with new keyboardist Keith Godchaux, who joined the band due to Ron "Pigpen" McKernan's declining health. This release presents an almost complete concert, with the exception of "Beat It On Down the Line" which was played after "Loser" but was omitted from the album. The album was mastered in HDCD by Jeffrey Norman.

== Track listing ==
Disc one

First set:

1. "Bertha" (Robert Hunter, Jerry Garcia) - 7:38
2. "Playing in the Band" (Hunter, Mickey Hart, Bob Weir) - 6:41
3. "Sugaree" (Hunter, Garcia) - 8:09
4. "Me and My Uncle" (John Phillips) - 3:59
5. "Tennessee Jed" (Hunter, Garcia) - 6:55
6. "Jack Straw" (Hunter, Weir) - 5:29
7. "Big Railroad Blues" (Noah Lewis) - 4:04
8. "Me And Bobby McGee" (Fred Foster, Kris Kristofferson) - 6:16
9. "Cumberland Blues" (Hunter, Garcia, Phil Lesh) - 6:12
10. "Cold Rain And Snow" (trad., arr. Grateful Dead) - 5:59
11. "Mexicali Blues" (John Barlow, Weir) - 3:30
12. "Loser" (Hunter, Garcia) - 6:45

Disc two

1. "El Paso" (Marty Robbins) - 4:43
2. "Comes A Time" (Hunter, Garcia) - 8:08
3. "One More Saturday Night" (Weir) - 4:52

Second set:

4. "Ramble On Rose" (Hunter, Garcia) - 6:54
5. "Sugar Magnolia" (Hunter, Weir) - 6:34
6. "Truckin' " > (Hunter, Garcia, Lesh) - 10:34
7. "Drums" > (Bill Kreutzmann) - 6:54
8. "The Other One" > (Kreutzmann, Weir) - 16:06
9. "Johnny B. Goode" (Chuck Berry) - 4:20

== Personnel ==
Grateful Dead

- Jerry Garcia – lead guitar, vocals
- Keith Godchaux – keyboards
- Bill Kreutzmann – drums
- Phil Lesh – electric bass, vocals
- Bob Weir – rhythm guitar, vocals

Production

- Rex Jackson – recording
- Jeffrey Norman – mastering
