= Road Trips Volume 1 Number 3 =

Live album by Grateful Dead
- Released: June 9, 2008
- Recorded: Summer 1971
- Genre: Rock
- Length: 154:52 bonus disc: 75:40
- Label: Grateful Dead
- Producer: Grateful Dead

Grateful Dead chronology
Winterland 1973: The Complete Recordings (2008)	Road Trips Volume 1 Number 3 (2008)	Rocking the Cradle: Egypt 1978 (2008)

Alternative cover
- Road Trips Volume 1 Number 3 Bonus Disc

Professional ratings
Review scores
Source	Rating
Allmusic	4/5 stars
Glide	3.5/5 stars
The Music Box	4/5 stars

Road Trips Volume 1 Number 3 is a two-CD live album by the American rock band the Grateful Dead. The third in their "Road Trips" series of albums, it was released on June 9, 2008. The first disc was recorded on July 31, 1971, at the Yale Bowl in New Haven, Connecticut, and the second disc was recorded on August 23, 1971, at the Auditorium Theatre in Chicago, Illinois.

A third, "bonus" disc was included with early shipments of the album. The bonus disc contains additional concert material from the summer of 1971.

Another live Grateful Dead album recorded during this same concert tour (including more of the August 6, 1971 show of the bonus disc) is Dick's Picks Volume 35.

== Track listing ==
=== Disc One ===
Yale Bowl, New Haven, Connecticut, July 31, 1971:

1. "Big Railroad Blues" (Noah Lewis) – 4:46
2. "Hard to Handle" (Otis Redding, Al Bell, Allen Jones) – 7:54
3. "Me and Bobby McGee" (Kris Kristofferson, Fred Foster) – 6:22
4. "Dark Star" > (Jerry Garcia, Mickey Hart, Bill Kreutzmann, Phil Lesh, Ron "Pigpen" McKernan, Bob Weir, Robert Hunter) – 22:48
5. "Bird Song" (Garcia, Hunter) – 7:59
6. "Not Fade Away" > (Buddy Holly, Norman Petty) – 4:44
7. "Goin' Down the Road Feeling Bad" > (traditional, arranged by Grateful Dead) – 9:24
8. "Not Fade Away" (Holly, Petty) – 3:13
9. "Uncle John's Band" > (Garia, Hunter) – 6:39
10. "Johnny B. Goode" (Chuck Berry) – 3:52

=== Disc Two ===
Auditorium Theatre, Chicago, Illinois, August 23, 1971:

1. "China Cat Sunflower" > (Garcia, Hunter) – 5:09
2. "I Know You Rider" (traditional, arranged by Grateful Dead) – 6:02
3. "Truckin' " (Garcia, Lesh, Weir, Hunter) – 8:51
4. "Sugaree" (Garcia, Hunter) – 7:11
5. "Cryptical Envelopment" > (Garcia) – 2:02
6. "Drums" > (Kreutzmann) – 4:26
7. "The Other One" > (Weir, Kreutzmann) – 13:00
8. "Me and My Uncle" > (John Phillips) – 3:04
9. "The Other One" > (Weir, Kreutzmann) – 7:32
10. "Cryptical Envelopment" >(Garcia) – 5:14
11. "Wharf Rat" > (Garcia, Hunter) – 8:53
12. "Sugar Magnolia" (Weir, Hunter) – 5:46

=== Bonus Disc ===
Hollywood Palladium, Hollywood, California, August 6, 1971:

1. "Bertha" (Garcia, Hunter) – 7:04
2. "Mr. Charlie" (McKernan, Hunter) – 3:57
3. "Cumberland Blues" (Garcia, Lesh, Hunter) – 5:50
4. "Brokedown Palace" (Garcia, Hunter) – 5:39
5. "Hard To Handle" (Redding, Bell, Jones) – 8:20

Yale Bowl, New Haven, Connecticut, July 31, 1971:

6. "Sing Me Back Home" (Merle Haggard) – 9:33
7. "Big Boss Man" (Luther Dixon, Al Smith) – 6:26

Terminal Island Correctional Facility, San Pedro, California, August 4, 1971:

8. "Not Fade Away" > (Holly, Petty) – 5:37
9. "Goin' Down the Road Feeling Bad" > (traditional, arranged by Grateful Dead) – 8:39
10. "Turn On Your Lovelight" (Joseph Scott, Deadric Malone) – 14:35

== Personnel ==
=== Grateful Dead ===
- Jerry Garcia – lead guitar, vocals
- Bill Kreutzmann – drums
- Phil Lesh – electric bass, vocals
- Ron "Pigpen" McKernan – organ, percussion, vocals
- Bob Weir – rhythm guitar, vocals

=== Production ===
- Produced by Grateful Dead
- Compilation produced by David Lemieux and Blair Jackson
- Recorded by Rex Jackson
- Edited and mastered by Jeffrey Norman at Garage Audio Mastering
- Cover art by Scott McDougall
- Package design by Steve Vance
- Liner notes written by Blair Jackson

== Sound quality ==
The album was released in HDCD format. This provides enhanced sound quality when played on CD players with HDCD capability, and is fully compatible with regular CD players.

== Recording dates ==
Road Trips Volume 1 Number 3 contains selections from the following concerts:

- July 31, 1971 — Yale Bowl, New Haven, Connecticut
- August 4, 1971 — Terminal Island Correctional Facility, San Pedro, California
- August 6, 1971 — Hollywood Palladium, Hollywood, California
- August 23, 1971 — Auditorium Theatre, Chicago, Illinois
