= Ralph Wilson Stadium =

Defunct football stadium in Orchard Park, New York

- The Ralph

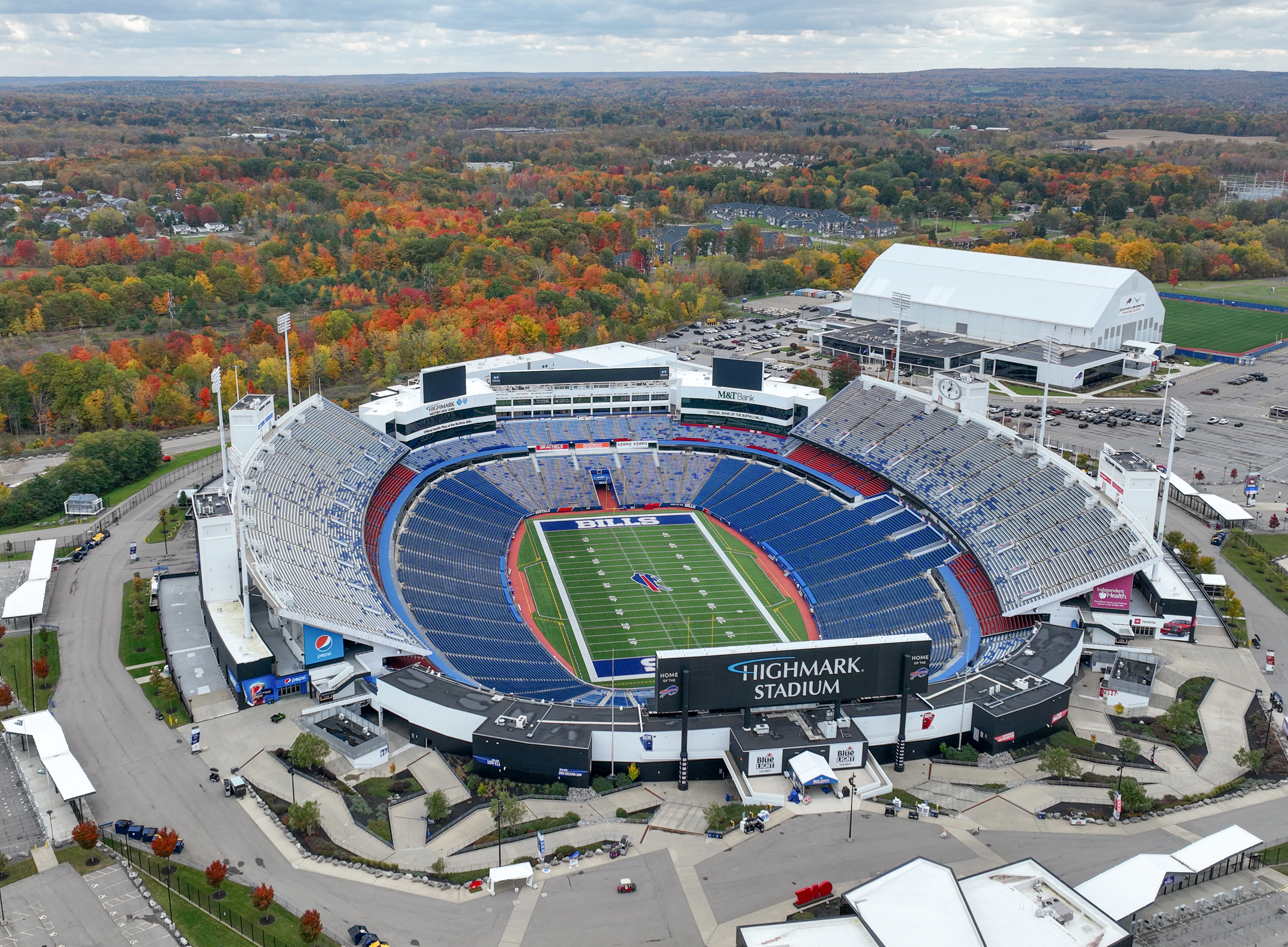
- The stadium in 2022

- Location in New York State Location in the United States
- Full name: Highmark BlueCross BlueShield Stadium
- Former names: Rich Stadium (1973–1997); Ralph Wilson Stadium (1998–2015); New Era Field (2016–2019); Bills Stadium (2020); Highmark Stadium (2021–2025)
- Address: 1 Bills Drive
- Location: Orchard Park, New York, U.S.
- Coordinates: 42.774°N 78.787°W
- Elevation: 770 ft (235 m) AMSL
- Owner: Erie County, New York
- Operator: Buffalo Bills
- Capacity: 71,608
- Surface: A-Turf Titan 50 (2011–2026); AstroPlay (2003–2010); AstroTurf (1973–2002)

Construction
- Groundbreaking: April 4, 1972
- Opened: August 17, 1973; 53 years ago
- Renovated: 1998, 2013
- Closed: January 4, 2026; 10 months ago
- Demolished: 2026 (ongoing)
- Cost: US$22 million (1973) ($160 million in 2025 dollars)
- Architects: HNTB; Populous (2013 renovation)
- Structural engineers: David M. Berg & Associates Inc. (2013 renovation)
- General contractors: The John W. Cowper Co. (1972–1973); Frank Schoenle Construction (2013 renovation)

Tenants
- Buffalo Bills (NFL) 1973–2025; Syracuse Orange football (NCAA) 1979

Website
- buffalobills.com/stadium

Ralph Wilson Stadium, colloquially known as The Ralph, was a stadium in Orchard Park, New York, in the Southtowns of the Buffalo metropolitan area. It served as the home venue of the Buffalo Bills of the National Football League (NFL) from 1973 to 2025. The stadium opened in 1973 as Rich Stadium and remained with that namesake until 1998. It was known as Ralph Wilson Stadium from 1998 to 2015, New Era Field from 2016 to 2019, Bills Stadium in 2020, and Highmark Stadium from 2021 until its closure following the 2025 season. The stadium was demolished over the course of spring and summer 2026 upon the completion of its replacement, also named Highmark Stadium, with cleanup efforts still ongoing.

== History ==
=== Stadium development ===
An original franchise of the American Football League (AFL) in 1960, the Buffalo Bills played their first 13 seasons at War Memorial Stadium, a multi-use WPA project stadium that opened in 1938, located on Buffalo's East Side. While suitable for AFL play in the 1960s, the "Rockpile" (as the stadium came to be nicknamed), was in disrepair and with a capacity of under 47,000, undersized for a National Football League (NFL) team. The league mandate instituted after the AFL–NFL merger of 1970 dictated a minimum of 50,000 seats.

In early 1971, owner Ralph Wilson was exploring options to relocate the team, possibly to Seattle, with other cities such as Memphis and Tampa soon expressing interest as well. In response, the Buffalo Chamber of Commerce and Erie County Legislature formed a joint committee to identify a location, stadium type, and cost estimate for a new stadium. Bonds were approved by the county legislature in September 1971. A groundbreaking ceremony for Erie County Stadium occurred on April 4, 1972, and by November the Erie County Legislature had approved an additional $338,546 to expedite construction of the stadium. The John W. Cowper Co. performed the general construction work for both the stadium and the adjacent SUNY Erie South Campus. Cowper's chairman at the time, David Donald, was also a Buffalo Chamber of Commerce leader involved in the civic efforts to keep the Bills in Buffalo. The stadium was completed as scheduled and opened in 1973.

=== Naming rights ===
In 1972, Rich Products, a Buffalo-based food products company, signed a 25-year, $1.5 million deal ($60,000 per year), by which the venue would be called "Rich Stadium"; one of the earliest examples of the sale of naming rights in North American sports. (The name was somewhat of a compromise, after Bills owner and founder Ralph Wilson rejected the name Rich wanted to use to promote its non-dairy creamer, "Coffee Rich Park.") By a vote of 16–4, the county legislature approved the name in November 1972, despite a matching offer from Wilson to name it "Buffalo Bills Stadium."

When the Bills organization regularly referred to the stadium without the "Rich" name, Rich Products brought a $7.5 million lawsuit against the team in 1976. After the original deal expired after a quarter century in 1998, the stadium was renamed in honor of Wilson. Rich Products balked at paying a greatly increased rights fee, which would have brought the price up to par with other NFL stadiums.

On August 13, 2016, Buffalo-based New Era Cap Company and the Bills reached a seven-year, $35 million agreement for stadium naming rights. The Bills and New Era officially announced the stadium's new name of New Era Field five days later, on August 18, 2016.

On July 15, 2020, the Bills announced that New Era Cap had asked to be released from their naming rights and sponsorship deal, and the two sides agreed on terms to terminate the contract. The statement referred to the venue only as "the stadium", and the Bills' website scrubbed all references to New Era. Under the terms of the 2012 lease agreement, in addition to Erie County having to approve any new stadium name as the stadium's legal owners, the government of the state of New York would also have a veto; the clause was inserted to quash ambush marketing attempts. Under this clause, Erie County executive Mark Poloncarz rejected a naming rights bid by minitoilet maker Tushy Bidets, saying that any name that "embarrasses the community" would not even be considered regardless of the size of the bid. Signs bearing the "New Era Field" name were removed beginning July 24. On August 20, the team announced they would temporarily use the name Bills Stadium until they found a new naming-rights partner.

On March 29, 2021, the team announced that the stadium’s new name would be Highmark Stadium after reaching a 10-year agreement with Highmark Blue Cross Blue Shield of Western New York.

=== Design and renovation ===
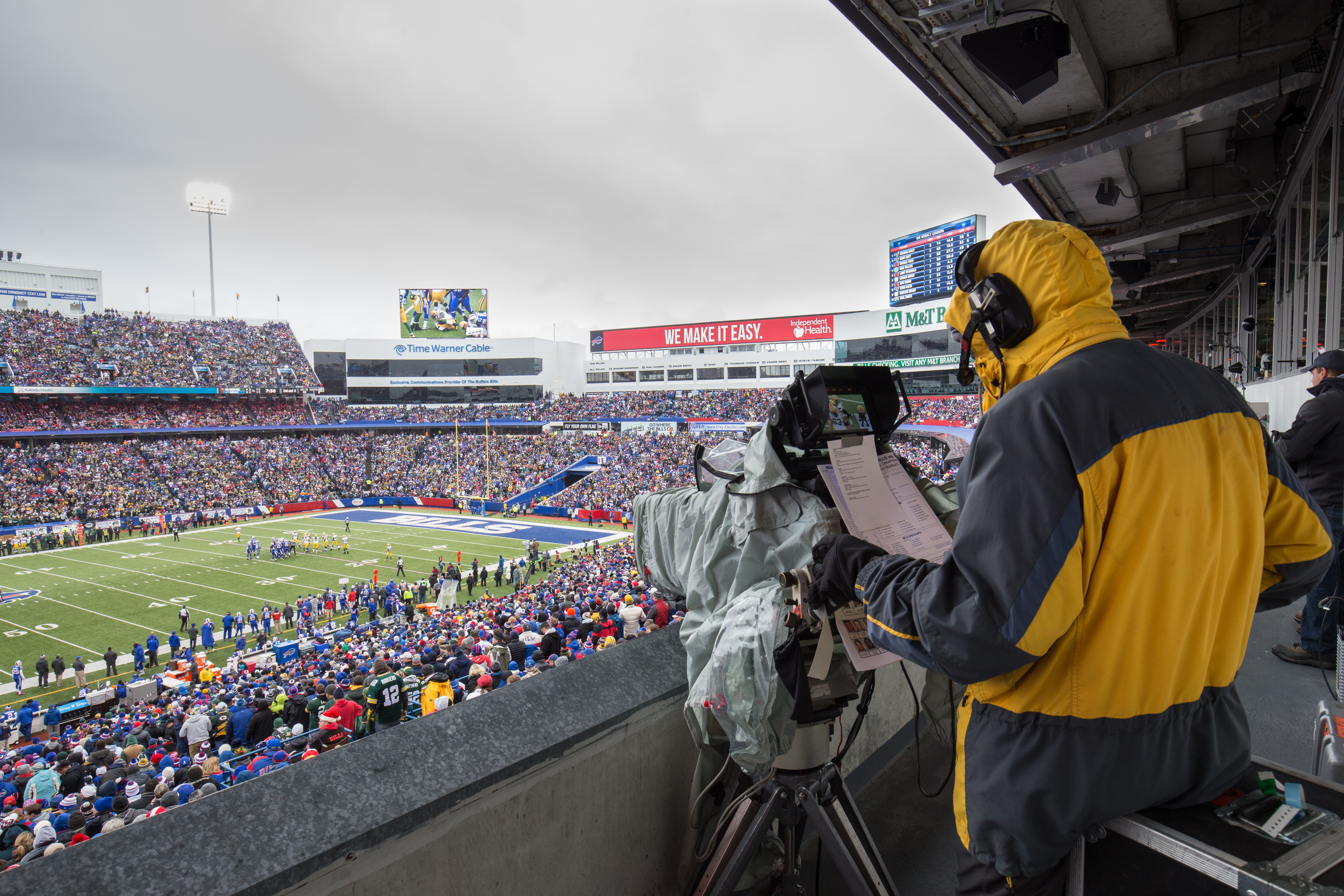
A look at the newly renovated stadium in December 2014. The two new HD video boards and new LED sponsor board are visible on the tunnel end of the stadium

The stadium is open-air, with a capacity of 71,870. It has never had a natural grass surface; AstroTurf was installed in the stadium upon its opening in 1973. The first renovation occurred in 1984 when the stadium's capacity was increased to 80,290 with the addition of 16 executive suites.

Eight years later in 1992, 24 more executive suites were added. In 1994, major renovations were made to the stadium including the addition of the Red Zone and Goal Line clubs that are enclosed in glass and have 500 seats. These renovations also added 14 executive suites. A massive $9.1 million (inflation adjusted) 41.5 by 31.5 feet (12.6 by 9.6 m) Sony JumboTron video scoreboard was a major update in 1994 and was the largest in the U.S. at the time. In 1998, $57 million were spent to refit the stadium with larger seats and more luxury and club seating as a part of the Bills lease renewal with Erie County. This caused the seating capacity to be reduced to just under 74,000.

In the 2003 offseason, the original style turf was replaced with a newer AstroTurf product, AstroTurf GameDay Grass (also known as AstroPlay). The lease agreement also stipulated Erie County would continue to upgrade the stadium; in the summer of 2007, a new HD Mitsubishi LED board measuring 88.8 by 32.5 feet (27.1 by 9.9 m) was installed and replaced the 13-year-old Sony Jumbotron. Over 1,000 feet (300 m) of Mitsubishi Diamond Vision LED Ribbon Boards were also installed in the interior during that renovation. The total cost for the 2007 project was $5.2 million, In 2011, the Bills changed their turf to a new product, A-Turf Titan, produced by a Western New York company. Buffalo is the only NFL stadium using the A-Turf Titan product.

On December 21, 2012, the lease negotiations between the Bills, Erie County, and the state of New York ended with the Bills signing a ten-year lease to stay in Buffalo until 2023. The agreement included $130 million in improvements to the stadium. Renovations included new larger entrance gates, larger HD sponsor boards added to each side of the video scoreboard, two new 33.6 by 59.84 feet (10.24 by 18.24 m) HD video boards, larger LED sponsor board added on the tunnel end of the stadium, expanded concessions, new team store, and redesign of areas and lots just outside the entrance gates. In addition, a life-sized statue of team founder Ralph Wilson was posthumously added to a new area outside the team store called "Founder's Plaza" in 2015.

Buffalo, by virtue of its position downwind of Lake Erie, is one of the nation's windiest cities, and as a result, the stadium was difficult for kickers, with swirling winds that change direction rapidly. This was exacerbated by the stadium's design. The field was 50 feet (15 m) below ground level, while the top of the upper deck stood only 60 feet (18 m) above ground. The open end lied parallel to the direction of the prevailing winds, so when the winds come in, they immediately dropped down into the bowl, causing the stadium's signature wind patterns.

=== Stadium records and facts ===
The first NFL game at the stadium was on September 30, 1973, a 9–7 victory against the New York Jets. The first NFL playoff game at the stadium came in the 1988 season, a 17–10 Bills victory over the Houston Oilers on January 1, 1989. The Bills won every ensuing playoff game at the stadium until they were defeated on December 28, 1996 by the Jacksonville Jaguars. They would not lose another playoff game at the stadium until January 22, 2023, when they lost 27–10 in the AFC Divisional Round against the Cincinnati Bengals. The stadium hosted the AFC Championship Game in 1991, 1992, and 1994.

The stadium hosted the largest comeback in NFL playoff history on January 3, 1993 when the Bills were down 35-3 to the Houston Oilers and miraculously won 41-38 in overtime. The game forever known as, The Comeback. It stood as the largest comeback in NFL history overall until December 17, 2022 when the Minnesota Vikings overcame a 33-0 deficit and ended up winning 39-36 in overtime versus the Indianapolis Colts.

The Bills defeated each of the 31 other teams there at least once and were unbeaten there against three teams: the Arizona Cardinals (5–0), Green Bay Packers (7–0), and Tampa Bay Buccaneers (4–0), who visited the stadium for the final time on November 16, 2025.

The final game at the stadium was held January 4, 2026, the team's regular season finale against the New York Jets. A closing ceremony was held as part of the festivities, including the Bills wearing red throwback helmets, a musical montage and fireworks display featuring "Iris" by the Goo Goo Dolls, "What a Wonderful World" by Louis Armstrong, one last performance of the Shout! song, appearances by several Bills alumni, and a pre-recorded statement from former coach and general manager Marv Levy.

=== Demolition ===
Seat removal began in March 2026 and was largely completed by May. These and other stadium artifacts were placed up for sale to the general public in January following the last game at the stadium. Power was disconnected from the stadium on May 1, and structural demolition began the same month. Structural demolition was completed on August 5, 2026. However, full demolition cleanup is scheduled to be complete by November 2026, and the site is planned to be ready for reuse by March 2027. As of August 2026, there are no official plans for the site that have been announced to the public.

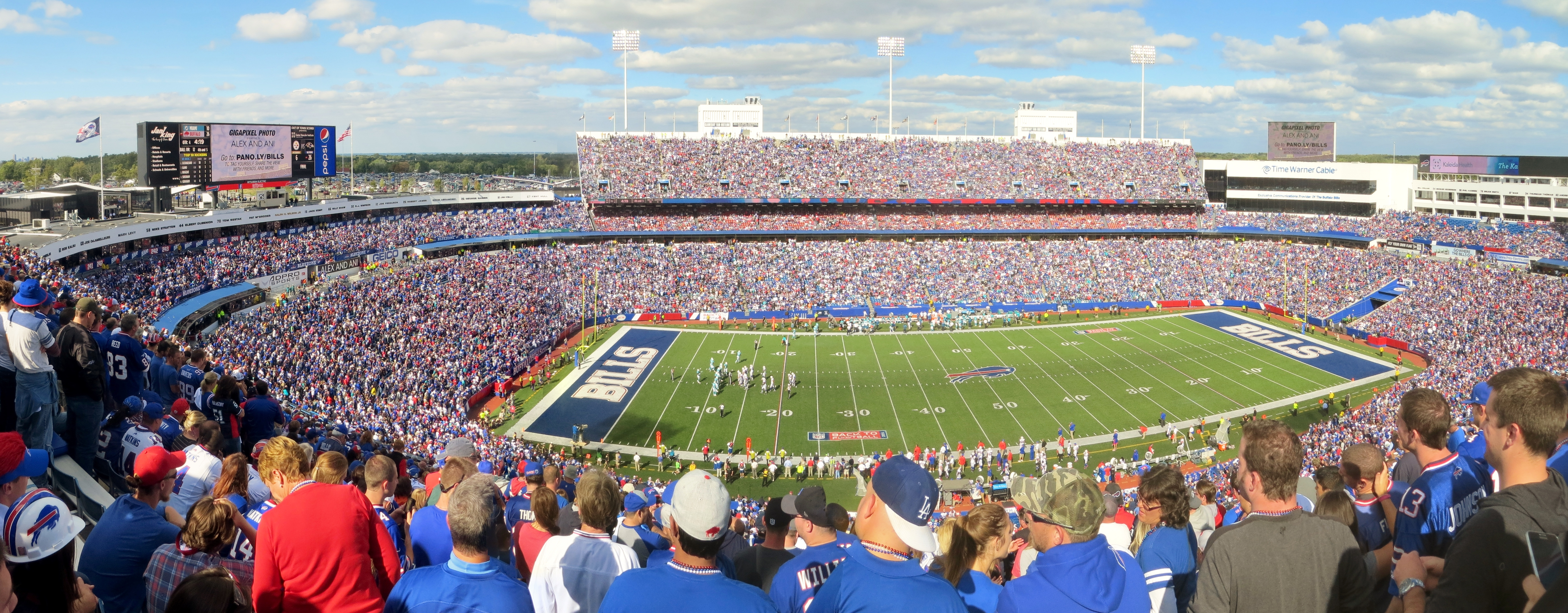
Ralph Wilson Stadium panorama, September 2014

=== Seating capacity ===
Years	Capacity
1972–1983	80,020
1984–1994	80,290
1995–1998	80,024
1999–2000	75,339
2001–2007	73,967
2008–2013	73,079
2014	71,857
2015	71,870
2016–2025	71,608

== Other uses ==
=== Other sporting events ===
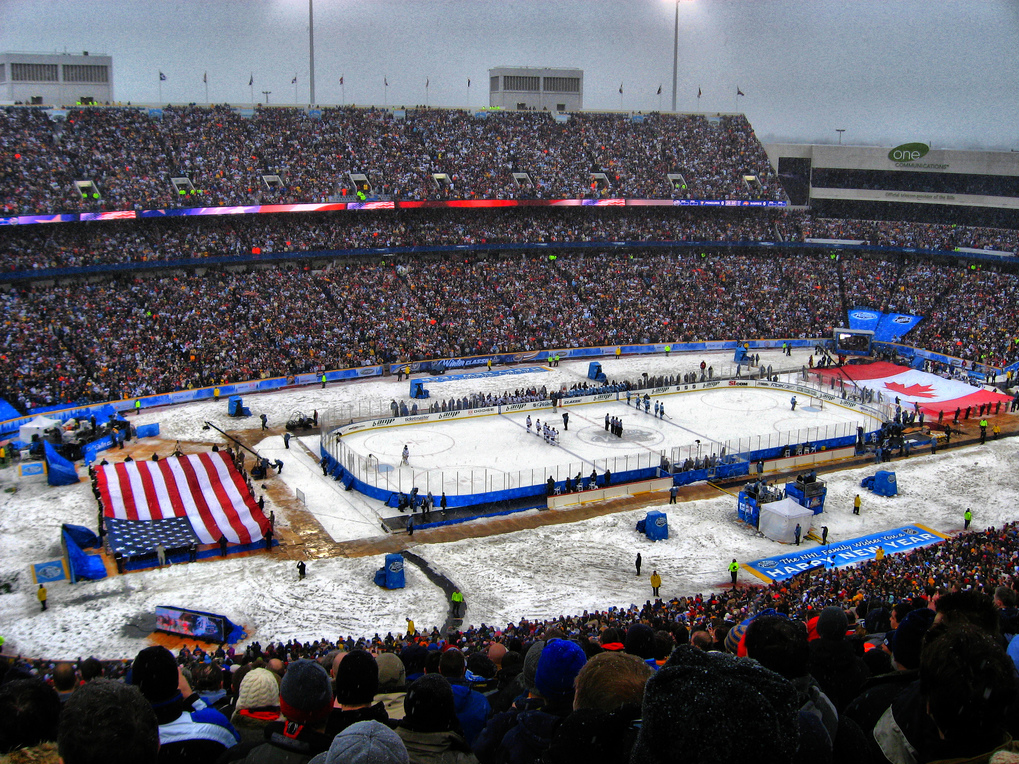
View of stadium during the 2008 NHL Winter Classic

The size of the field at Ralph Wilson Stadium was specifically designed for National Football League dimensions and sight lines, along with football and team markings being formed permanently into the turf, making it extremely difficult for other outdoor sporting events such as soccer, baseball, track and field, or rugby to be held there. None of any significance were ever held at the stadium.

The stadium annually hosted the region's Section VI and Monsignor Martin Athletic Association high school football playoffs.

In 1984, the stadium was covered in dirt for the Grand National Motor Spectacular auto show and the AMA Supercross Championship.

The opening ceremony of the 1993 Summer Universiade was held at the stadium.

==== College football ====
Syracuse University played two home games at the stadium in 1979. Syracuse was left without an on-campus home for one season between the demolition of Archbold Stadium and the construction of the Carrier Dome on its footprint.

The stadium hosted a Black Friday contest between the UB Bulls and the Bowling Green Falcons in 2013.

==== Ice hockey ====
On January 1, 2008, the Buffalo Sabres hosted the Pittsburgh Penguins in the first NHL Winter Classic. The Penguins won 2–1 in a shootout in front of 71,217. On December 29, 2017, the stadium hosted a match between the U.S. and Canada at the 2018 World Junior Ice Hockey Championships being hosted by Buffalo.

Date	Away team	Result	Home team	Spectators
January 1, 2008	Pittsburgh Penguins	2–1 (SO)	Buffalo Sabres	71,217
December 29, 2017	Canada U20	3–4 (SO)	United States U20	44,592

=== Concerts ===
Bob Seger, Yes, J. Geils Band, and Donovan all performed at Rich Stadium in Orchard Park, NY, for the "Superfest 12" event on August 20, 1977, a massive all-day concert featuring an iconic lineup of rock legends that drew huge crowds. Nearly 30 concerts have been held at the stadium, starting in 1974 with Eric Clapton and The Band.

Several bands played the stadium multiple times, including The Rolling Stones, who played there in 1975, 1978, 1981, 1997, and 2015.

The Grateful Dead played the stadium five times including 7/4/86, 7/4/89, 7/16/90, 6/6/92, and 6/13/93 with their July 4, 1989 Truckin' Up to Buffalo performance being documented on Vinyl, CD, and DVD.

The Who, Dave Matthews Band, Guns N' Roses, and The Jackson Five all played at the stadium multiple times as well.

Double and multi-billed concerts were also scheduled at the stadium.

There were notable large concerts that were scheduled to take place at the stadium but were later canceled. Led Zeppelin was set to perform at the stadium on their 1977 North American Tour. The concert was one of the seven remaining concerts on the tour that were canceled due to the death of lead singer Robert Plant's son. A Bruce Springsteen concert, that was originally scheduled at the stadium in 2003, was moved to the smaller Darien Lake Performing Arts Center due to low ticket sales.

Concert appearances began to wane in the 1990s at the stadium, which ended with Dave Matthews Band and NSYNC each playing a concert in June 2001, with no more concerts at the stadium for 14 years. This was due to the combination of a declining number of stadium rock acts, population decline, and the availability of other, more intimate, venues in Western New York such as Artpark in Lewiston, Darien Lake Performing Arts Center in Corfu, the Thursday at the Square series among others, Seneca Niagara Casino, and the KeyBank Center, which opened in 1996, replacing Buffalo Memorial Auditorium in downtown Buffalo.

Date	Artist	Opening act(s)	Tour / Concert name	Attendance	Revenue	Notes
July 26, 1974	Emerson Lake & Palmer	James Gang; Lynyrd Skynyrd	Brain Salad Surgery Tour	—	—	
July 12, 1975	Yes	Johnny Winter; J. Geils Band	Relayer Tour	—	—	
August 8, 1975	The Rolling Stones	—	Tour of the Americas '75	—	—	
August 7, 1976	Elton John	Boz Scaggs	Louder Than Concorde Tour	—	—	
June 19, 1977	Lynyrd Skynyrd	Blue Öyster Cult; Ted Nugent; Starz	Street Survivors Tour	—	—	
July 4, 1978	The Rolling Stones	Journey; April Wine; Atlanta Rhythm Section	US Tour 1978	—	—	
July 28, 1978	Fleetwood Mac	Pablo Cruise; Bob Welch; Foreigner	Rumours Tour	—	—	
September 27, 1981	The Rolling Stones	Journey; George Thorogood & the Destroyers	American Tour 1981	75,000	$1,125,000	
September 26, 1982	The Who	David Johansen; The Clash	The Who Tour 1982	80,000 / 80,000	$1,200,000	
August 25, 1984	The Jacksons	—	Victory Tour	94,000	$2,820,000	
August 26, 1984	The Jacksons	—	Victory Tour	94,000	$2,820,000	
July 4, 1986	Bob Dylan; Tom Petty and the Heartbreakers	Grateful Dead	True Confessions Tour	63,850 / 75,000	$1,277,000	Portions of this show were broadcast as part of VH1's coverage of Farm Aid II
June 19, 1988	Van Halen; Scorpions	Dokken; Metallica; Kingdom Come	Monsters of Rock	—	—	
July 4, 1989	Grateful Dead	10,000 Maniacs	—	—	—	This show was documented on the CD/DVD Truckin' Up to Buffalo.
July 18, 1989	The Who	—	The Who Tour 1989	—	—	
July 16, 1990	Grateful Dead	Crosby, Stills, and Nash	—	—	—	
June 6, 1992	Grateful Dead	Steve Miller Band	—	—	—	
July 25, 1992	Guns N' Roses; Metallica	Faith No More	Guns N' Roses/Metallica Stadium Tour	44,833 / 59,326	$1,322,574	
June 13, 1993	Grateful Dead	Sting	—	—	—	
July 14, 1994	Billy Joel; Elton John	—	Face to Face 1994	57,058 / 57,500	$2,380,834	
October 8, 1997	The Rolling Stones	Blues Traveler	Bridges to Babylon Tour	30,404 / 35,000	$1,655,588	
June 3, 2000	Tim McGraw; Kenny Chesney	—	—	—	—	Tim McGraw and Kenny Chesney were arrested on charges of stealing a horse owned by the Erie County Sheriff's Department.
July 21, 2000	Dave Matthews Band	Ozomatli; Ben Harper & The Innocent Criminals	—	—	—	
June 10, 2001	NSYNC	BBMak	PopOdyssey	43,406 / 55,874	$2,175,436	These two concerts were the last at the stadium for more than a decade.
June 20, 2001	Dave Matthews Band	Angelique Kidjo; Macy Gray	2001 Tour	—	—	These two concerts were the last at the stadium for more than a decade.
July 11, 2015	The Rolling Stones	St. Paul & The Broken Bones	Zip Code Tour	49,552 / 49,552	$8,634,557	This is the first concert at the stadium since 2001.
September 3, 2015	One Direction	Icona Pop	On the Road Again Tour	38,137 / 38,137	$2,700,736	
August 16, 2017	Guns N' Roses	Live	Not In This Lifetime... Tour	32,245 / 35,630	$2,626,070	
September 5, 2017	U2	Beck	The Joshua Tree Tour 2017	41,106 / 41,106	$4,269,245	
August 18, 2018	Beyoncé; Jay-Z	Chloe x Halle, DJ Khaled	On the Run II Tour	38,053 / 38,053	$4,262,076	
August 14, 2021	Billy Joel	—	Billy Joel in Concert	—	—	
July 23, 2022	Garth Brooks	—	The Garth Brooks Stadium Tour	—	—	
August 10, 2022	Def Leppard; Mötley Crüe	Poison; Joan Jett & the Blackhearts; Classless Act	The Stadium Tour	—	—	
August 11, 2022	Metallica	Greta Van Fleet; Ice Nine Kills	2021–2022 tour	40,700 / 40,700	$4,800,000	
April 19, 2024	Luke Combs	—	Growin’ Up And Gettin’ Old Tour	—	—	
April 20, 2024	Luke Combs	—	Growin’ Up And Gettin’ Old Tour	—	—	
June 14, 2025	George Strait; Chris Stapleton	Parker McCollum	—	—	—	

=== Non-sporting or music events ===
The stadium also hosted the Drum Corps International championships three times.

Autocross racing events were held in one of the stadium's parking lots during the spring, summer, and fall months. The local WNY SCCA Chapter hosted the autocrosses.

== Alleged curse ==
Since the Bills moved from War Memorial Stadium into Ralph Wilson Stadium, it has been noted that the team has not won a championship and has had frequent periods of heartbreak, including four Super Bowl losses in a row. Several writers have owed this to the fact that the stadium was built just yards away from a family cemetery as part of territory once owned by the Sheldon Family. A plaque just outside the stadium at the gates graces the cemetery and also notes that the stadium was built on the site of an ancient Wenro village.

== See also ==
- War Memorial Stadium (Buffalo)

Events and tenants
Preceded by War Memorial Stadium	Home of the Buffalo Bills; 1973 – 2026	Succeeded by Highmark Stadium
Preceded by Arrowhead Stadium; Foxboro Stadium; Byrd Stadium	Host of the Drum Corps International; World Championship; 1990; 1995; 2001	Succeeded by Cotton Bowl; Citrus Bowl; Camp Randall Stadium
Preceded by First game	Host of the NHL Winter Classic; 2008	Succeeded by Wrigley Field
Preceded by Mile High Stadium; Joe Robbie Stadium	Host of AFC Championship Game; 1991 – 1992; 1994	Succeeded by Joe Robbie Stadium; Three Rivers Stadium
Preceded by Sahlen Field	Host of the National Buffalo Wing Festival; 2021 – 2024	Succeeded by Sahlen Field
