= Mustang Sally (song) =

- German 7" vinyl single cover

Single by Wilson Pickett

from the album The Wicked Pickett
- B-side: "Three Time Loser"
- Released: 1966
- Genre: R&B
- Length: 3:08
- Label: Atlantic
- Songwriter: Mack Rice
- Producers: Jerry Wexler, Rick Hall

Wilson Pickett singles chronology
"Land of a Thousand Dances" (1966)	"Mustang Sally" (1966)	"Everybody Needs Somebody to Love" (1967)

"Mustang Sally" is a rhythm and blues (R&B) song written and first recorded by Mack Rice in 1965. It was released on the Blue Rock label (4014) in May 1965 with "Sir Mack Rice" as the artist. The song uses an AAB layout with a 24-bar structure.

It gained greater popularity when Wilson Pickett covered it the following year on a single, a version that was also released on the 1966 album The Wicked Pickett. Also in 1966, John Lee Hooker recorded an entirely different song with a similar title — "Mustang Sally & GTO."

In 2000, the Wilson Pickett version of "Mustang Sally" on Atlantic Records was inducted into the Grammy Hall of Fame.

== Personnel ==
Credits are adapted from the liner notes of The Muscle Shoals Sound: 3614 Jackson Highway.

- Gilbert Caples – tenor saxophone
- Charlie Chalmers – tenor saxophone
- Tommy Cogbill – bass guitar
- Roger Hawkins – drums
- Jimmy Johnson – rhythm guitar
- Ed Logan – tenor saxophone
- Gene "Bowlegs" Miller – trumpet
- Chips Moman – lead guitar
- Floyd Newman – baritone saxophone
- Spooner Oldham – organ
- Wilson Pickett – lead vocals
- The Sweet Inspirations – backing vocals

== History ==
Rice was visiting singer Della Reese, who was considering buying a new Lincoln Continental for her drummer and band leader Calvin Shields for his birthday. Rice and other band members were teasing Shields about the pending gift, and Shields replied that he did not want a Lincoln; he wanted a Ford Mustang. Rice had never heard of the Mustang, which had just come out, but he teased Shields about wanting a smaller car. He decided there might be a song in the situation, changing it to be about a woman who doesn't want to do anything but ride around in her new car. Rice called the early version "Mustang Mama," but changed the title after Aretha Franklin suggested "Mustang Sally" because he used the name Sally in the chorus.

Rice got part of the chorus from the children's game song (recorded by various artists) "Little Sally Walker," versions of which include the lyrics "Ride Sally ride, wipe your weepin' eyes," with variations. His variation goes, "All you wanna do is ride around, Sally/Ride, Sally, ride/One of these early mornings/You're gonna be wipin' your weepin' eyes."

In the liner notes for The Rascals Anthology, Felix Cavaliere states that The Young Rascals recorded "Mustang Sally" and "Land of a Thousand Dances" before Pickett and that Atlantic Records "copped those two songs from them and gave them to Pickett" to record. When Cavaliere does his flashback concerts, he also recounts how Rice thanked him for having been the B-side of the Young Rascals' hit "Good Lovin'," explaining that the royalties were paid by records sold — thus, the B-side writer was paid for an equal number of sales as the A-side.

== Popular versions ==
Rice's version made it to No. 15 on the U.S. R&B charts in 1965. Pickett's version climbed to No. 6 on the R&B charts and No. 23 on the Pop charts in 1966, No. 4 in Canada on the (RPM) charts, and No. 28 in the UK Singles Chart on its original release and No. 62, when it was released again in 1987.

In 2004, Rolling Stone ranked Wilson Pickett's recording of the song at No. 434 on a list of Rolling Stone's 500 Greatest Songs of All Time. The song dropped seven spots to No. 441, when the magazine published its 2010 update of the list.

== Popular culture and covers ==
- Buddy Guy recorded the song in 1991, featuring Jeff Beck.
- The song featured prominently in the 1991 film The Commitments and appears on the film's soundtrack album, sung by Andrew Strong. It was released as a single from the album and reached No. 63 in the UK Singles Chart, No. 43 on the Australian charts and No. 17 on the New Zealand charts. In 2022 it was certified Silver by the British Phonographic Industry (BPI).
- When astronaut Sally Ride became the first American woman in space on the Space Shuttle Challenger in 1983, many in the crowd attending the launch wore T-shirts printed with a play on the lyric, "Ride, Sally Ride."
- On Fox's TV show Glee, Noah Guthrie covered the song in the second episode of the sixth season ("Homecoming").
