= Truckin' Up to Buffalo =

Live album by Grateful Dead
- Released: July 2005
- Recorded: July 4, 1989
- Genres: Folk rock, jam, country rock
- Length: 157:05
- Label: Grateful Dead Records

Grateful Dead chronology
Grateful Dead Download Series Volume 3 (2005)	Truckin' Up to Buffalo (2005)	Grateful Dead Download Series Volume 4 (2005)

Professional ratings
Review scores
Source	Rating
Allmusic	3.5/5 stars
The Music Box	4.5/5 stars

Truckin' Up to Buffalo is a double CD soundtrack to the DVD video of the same name by the Grateful Dead. It was recorded at Rich Stadium in Orchard Park on July 4, 1989. There are no differences in the track listings of the CD and DVD versions. Two tracks had already been released: "All Along the Watchtower" was included in the compilation of Dylan songs, Postcards of the Hanging, and "Man Smart (Woman Smarter)" was released on Weir Here – The Best of Bob Weir. The album title is taken from a line in the band's song "Truckin'", though it was not included in the setlist that night.

== Track listing ==
=== Disc one ===
First Set:

1. "Bertha" > (Robert Hunter, Jerry Garcia) - 7:57
2. "Greatest Story Ever Told" (Hunter, Mickey Hart, Bob Weir) - 4:36
3. "Cold Rain and Snow" (traditional, arr. Grateful Dead) - 6:45
4. "Walkin' Blues" (Robert Johnson) - 6:57
5. "Row Jimmy" (Hunter, Garcia) - 10:50
6. "When I Paint My Masterpiece" (Bob Dylan) - 6:09
7. "Stagger Lee" (Hunter, Garcia) - 6:01
8. "Looks Like Rain" > (John Barlow, Weir) - 7:11
9. "Deal" (Hunter, Garcia) - 7:53

Second Set:

10. "Touch of Grey" > (Hunter, Garcia) - 6:30
11. "Man Smart, Woman Smarter" (Norman Span) - 8:47 (Note: Previously released (in an edited version) on Weir Here)

=== Disc two ===
1. "Ship of Fools" > (Hunter, Garcia) - 8:13
2. "Playing in the Band (reprise)" > (Hunter, Hart, Weir) - 3:30
3. "Terrapin Station" > (Hunter, Garcia) - 12:18
4. "Drums" > (Hart, Bill Kreutzmann) - 9:00
5. "Space" > (Garcia, Phil Lesh, Weir) - 7:28
6. "I Will Take You Home" > (Brent Mydland) - 3:53
7. "All Along the Watchtower" > (Dylan) - 5:52 (Note: Previously released on Postcards of the Hanging)
8. "Morning Dew" > (Bonnie Dobson, Tim Rose) - 11:10
9. "Not Fade Away" (Buddy Holly, Norman Petty) - 10:08

Encore:

10. "U.S. Blues" (Hunter, Garcia) - 6:03

== Personnel ==
=== Grateful Dead ===
- Jerry Garcia – guitar, vocals
- Bob Weir – guitar, vocals
- Phil Lesh – electric bass, vocals
- Brent Mydland – keyboards, Hammond B3, vocals
- Mickey Hart – drums, percussion
- Bill Kreutzmann – drums, percussion

=== Production ===
- Jimmy Edwards – executive producers
- James Austin – executive producers
- Len Dell'Amico - co-producer, director
- John Cutler – recording
- Jeffrey Norman – mixing
- David Lemieux – tape archivist
- Eileen Law – archival research
- Richard Biffle – cover art
- Brian Connors – art coordination
- Robert Minkin – photos, package design & production
- Susana Millman – photos
- Blair Jackson – liner notes
- Sheryl Farber – editorial supervision
- Scott Webber – project coordination

== Charts ==
Chart (2005)	Peak position
US Billboard 200	137
