= Good Lovin' =

1965 single by The Rascals

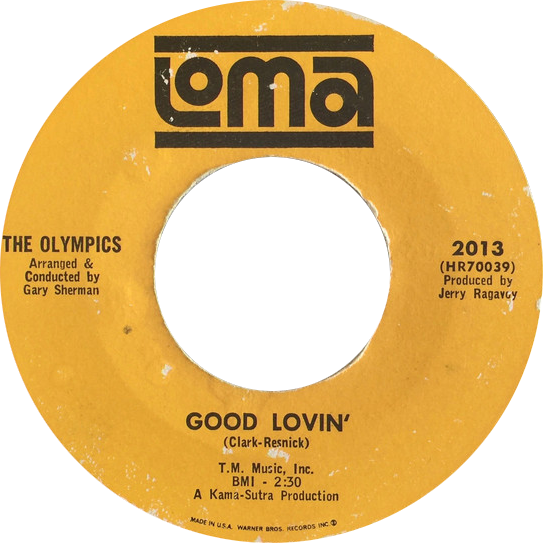
- US single of the Olympics' recording

Single by the Olympics
- B-side: "Olympic Shuffle"
- Released: March 1965
- Genre: Pop; doo-wop; rock and roll
- Label: Loma
- Songwriters: Rudy Clark, Arthur Resnick
- Producer: Jerry Ragovoy

"Good Lovin'"

Single by the Young Rascals

from the album The Young Rascals
- B-side: "Mustang Sally"
- Released: February 21, 1966
- Recorded: February 1, 1966
- Genre: Rock; blue-eyed soul
- Length: 2:28
- Label: Atlantic
- Songwriters: Rudy Clark; Arthur Resnick
- Producers: Arif Mardin, Tom Dowd

The Young Rascals singles chronology
"I Ain't Gonna Eat Out My Heart Anymore" (1965)	"Good Lovin'" (1966)	"You Better Run" (1966)

"Good Lovin'" is a song written by Rudy Clark and Arthur Resnick that was a No. 1 hit single for the American rock band the Young Rascals in 1966.

== Original version ==
The song was first recorded by Lemme B. Good in March 1965. The following month it was recorded with different lyrics by R&B artists the Olympics, produced by Jerry Ragovoy; this version reached No. 81 on the Billboard Pop Singles chart.

== The Young Rascals' version ==
Felix Cavaliere heard the Olympics' recording on a New York City radio station and the group added it to their concert repertoire, using the same lyrics and virtually the same arrangement as the Olympics' version. Co-producer Tom Dowd captured this live feel on their 1966 recording, even though the group did not think the performance held together well. "Good Lovin'" rose to the top of the Billboard Pop Singles chart in the spring of 1966 and represented the Young Rascals' first real hit.

"Good Lovin'" is one of The Rock and Roll Hall of Fame's 500 Songs that Shaped Rock and Roll, and was ranked No. 333 on Rolling Stone's 500 Greatest Songs of All Time list. Writer Dave Marsh placed it at No. 108 in his 1989 book The Heart of Rock and Soul: The 1001 Greatest Singles Ever Made, saying it is "the greatest example ever of a remake surpassing the quality of an original without changing a thing about the arrangement."

=== Charts ===
Chart (1966)	Peak position
US Billboard Hot 100	1

== Grateful Dead version ==
A popular version was by the Grateful Dead, who made it a workhorse of their concert rotation, appearing almost every year from 1969 on. It was sung in their early years during the 1960s and early 1970s by Ron "Pigpen" McKernan and later by Bob Weir. The Weir rendition was recorded for the group's 1978 Shakedown Street album and came in for a good amount of criticism: Rolling Stone said it "feature[d] aimless ensemble work and vocals that Bob Weir should never have attempted." On November 11, 1978, the Grateful Dead performed it on Saturday Night Live.

== Certifications ==
Certifications for "Good Lovin"
Region	Certification	Certified units/sales
United States (RIAA)	Gold	500,000^{‡}
^{‡} Sales+streaming figures based on certification alone.
