= What a Long Strange Trip It's Been =

Greatest hits album by Grateful Dead
- Released: August 18, 1977
- Recorded: 1967–1972
- Genres: Jam rock, roots rock, psychedelic rock
- Length: 85:38
- Label: Warner Bros.
- Producers: Grateful Dead, Paul L. Wexler

Grateful Dead chronology
Terrapin Station (1977)	What a Long Strange Trip It's Been (1977)	Shakedown Street (1978)

Professional ratings
Review scores
Source	Rating
AllMusic	3/5 stars
Christgau's Record Guide	B
Rolling Stone	4/5 stars

What a Long Strange Trip It's Been is the second compilation album by American rock band Grateful Dead. It was released August 18, 1977, by Warner Bros. Records, three and a half years after the Skeletons from the Closet compilation. Both albums are subtitled "The Best of the Grateful Dead". Unlike the previous compilation, What a Long Strange Trip It's Been is a double album.

== Content ==
After the Grateful Dead had completed their contract with Warner Bros. and begun self-releasing their recordings, the label released Skeletons from the Closet. The compilation of tracks from their back catalog was successful, and when the band moved onto Arista Records in 1977 to record Terrapin Station, Warner Bros. released a second, larger compilation of tracks from the 1967–1972 period.

What a Long Strange Trip It's Been is a two-record set, with mostly studio tracks collected on the first disc and all live tracks on the second. Sixteen of the tracks are taken from previously released albums. Two tracks are single versions previously unavailable on album: the studio version of "Dark Star", and its B-side, the single mix of Anthem of the Sun's "Born Cross-Eyed". The Grateful Dead's most recognizable song at the time, "Truckin'," is the only track used on both compilations. "St. Stephen" appears again, though this time in a live version (an excerpt of the Live/Dead track). Of the nine original Warner Bros. albums, the only one unrepresented is Anthem of the Sun (aside from its associated single).

== Release ==
The title comes from the bridge of "Truckin'", which ends with the stanza:

Lately it occurs to me
What a long strange trip it's been.

The cover art is darkly themed, with red, Old English Gothic script and a black skeleton graphic against a black background. The metallized skeleton (less distinct on some printings) is an air-brushed image by Rick Griffin, who had created several previous album covers for the band. The back cover features the rear view of the skeleton, with the text reversed. The inside of the gatefold features the first appearance of the iconic "dancing skeletons" graphic, rendered in white. Also featured are photographs of the band in concert. However, rather than dating from the Warner Bros. era, they are from October 1976 (see Dick's Picks Volume 33).

What a Long Strange Trip It's Been was released as a double CD in 1989, after sales of the band's albums had been revitalized by In the Dark. Like its predecessor compilation, it has achieved Platinum sales certification (in 2001).

== Track listing ==
Side one

1. "New, New Minglewood Blues" (trad.; credited to McGannahan Skjellyfetti) – 2:35
  - from The Grateful Dead
2. "Cosmic Charlie" (Jerry Garcia, Robert Hunter) – 5:31
  - from Aoxomoxoa
3. "Truckin'" (Garcia, Hunter, Phil Lesh, Bob Weir) – 5:06
  - from American Beauty
4. "Black Peter" (Garcia, Hunter) – 7:31
  - from Bear's Choice; live, February 13, 1970, Fillmore East, New York City
5. "Born Cross-Eyed" (single version) (Weir) – 2:58
  - from "Dark Star" single

Side two

1. "Ripple" (Garcia, Hunter) – 4:10
  - from American Beauty
2. "Doin' That Rag" (Garcia, Hunter) – 4:43
  - from Aoxomoxoa
3. "Dark Star" (Garcia, Hunter) – 2:41
  - from "Dark Star" single
4. "High Time" (Garcia, Hunter) – 5:14
  - from Workingman's Dead
5. "New Speedway Boogie" (Garcia, Hunter) – 4:05
  - from Workingman's Dead

Side three

1. "St. Stephen" (Garcia, Hunter, Lesh) – 5:24
  - excerpt, from Live/Dead; live, February 27, 1969, Fillmore West, San Francisco
2. "Jack Straw" (Weir, Hunter) – 4:53
  - from Europe '72; live, May 3, 1972, Olympia Theatre, Paris
3. "Me & My Uncle" (John Phillips) – 3:04
  - from Grateful Dead (untitled); live, April 29, 1971, Fillmore East, New York City;
4. "Tennessee Jed" (Garcia, Hunter) – 7:12
  - from Europe '72; live, May 3, 1972, Olympia Theatre, Paris

Side four

1. "Cumberland Blues" (Garcia, Hunter, Lesh) – 5:40
  - from Europe '72; live, April 8, 1972, Empire Pool, London
2. "Playing in the Band" (Weir, Hunter, Mickey Hart) – 4:42
  - from Grateful Dead (untitled); live, April 6, 1971, Hammerstein Ballroom, Manhattan Center, New York City
3. "Brown-Eyed Woman" (Garcia, Hunter) – 4:38
  - from Europe '72; live, April 14, 1972, Tivolis Koncertsal, Copenhagen
4. "Ramble On Rose" (Garcia, Hunter) – 6:02
  - from Europe '72; live, May 26, 1972, Lyceum Theatre, London

== Personnel ==
Grateful Dead

- Tom Constanten – keyboards
- Jerry Garcia – guitar, vocals
- Donna Jean Godchaux – vocals
- Keith Godchaux – piano, keyboards
- Mickey Hart – drums
- Bill Kreutzmann – drums
- Phil Lesh – bass guitar, vocals
- Ron "Pigpen" McKernan – organ, vocals
- Bob Weir – guitar, vocals

Technical personnel

- Betty Cantor, Bob Matthews – production, engineering
- David Hassinger, Owsley Stanley – production
- Paul Wexler – executive production

== Certifications ==
Certification	Date
Gold	August 24, 2001
Platinum	August 24, 2001
