= Two from the Vault =

Live album by Grateful Dead
- Released: May 1992
- Recorded: August 24, 1968; August 23, 1968 (bonus disc)
- Venue: Shrine Auditorium (Los Angeles)
- Genres: Rock, psychedelic rock
- Length: 109:11
- Label: Grateful Dead GDCD40162
- Producer: Dan Healy

Grateful Dead chronology
Infrared Roses (1991)	Two from the Vault (1992)	Dick's Picks Volume 1 (1993)

Professional ratings
Review scores
Source	Rating
AllMusic	4/5 stars

Two from the Vault is a three-CD live album by the rock band the Grateful Dead. It was recorded at the Shrine Auditorium in Los Angeles, California on August 24, 1968. The event was left unreleased for nearly 25 years, before being mixed down from the original multi-track reels and released on Grateful Dead Records in 1992.

== Recording ==
The concert was recorded on a then-state-of-the-art, one-inch 8-track tape machine that was supplied by the band's record label, Warner Bros. The record company also insisted on supplying engineers who turned out to be unfamiliar with the close miking technique involved in recording rock music. Consequently, each of the eight tracks contained significant leakage from all of the other instruments in the band, resulting in severe phase cancellation problems.

Almost twenty-four years later, Don Pearson and producer Dan Healy solved this problem by employing a B&K 2032 Fast Fourier transform (FFT) digital spectrum analyzer to measure the delay in time between the different microphones, using the track of bassist Phil Lesh as the time centerpiece. The delay times were fed into a TC1280 stereo digital delay, which, along with careful mixing, resulted in a nearly perfect stereo image.

== Releases ==
An expanded edition of the album, with a third CD, was released in 2007 featuring the three songs (from August 23, 1968) previously released as bonus tracks on the 2003 reissue of Anthem of the Sun .

Two from the Vault was released on vinyl by Light in the Attic Records as a four-disc album on December 9, 2014.

== Track listing ==
Disc one

1. "Good Morning, Little Schoolgirl" (Sonny Boy Williamson) – 15:59
2. "Dark Star" (Jerry Garcia, Phil Lesh, Ron McKernan, Bob Weir, Mickey Hart, Bill Kreutzmann, Robert Hunter) – 11:20 →
3. "St. Stephen" (Garcia, Lesh, Hunter) – 4:40 →
4. "The Eleven" (Lesh, Hunter) – 14:27 →
5. "Death Don't Have No Mercy" (Reverend Gary Davis) – 8:23

Disc two

1. "That's It for the Other One" (Grateful Dead) – 15:40 →
  - "Cryptical Envelopment" (Garcia)
  - "Quadlibet for Tenderfeet" (Grateful Dead)
  - "The Faster We Go, the Rounder We Get" (Weir, Kreutzmann)
2. "New Potato Caboose" (Lesh, Robert Petersen) – 14:16 →
3. "Turn On Your Lovelight" (Joseph Scott, Deadric Malone) – 17:13
4. "(Walk Me Out in the) Morning Dew" (Bonnie Dobson, Tim Rose) – 7:13

Disc three (2007 expanded edition)

1. "Alligator" (McKernan, Lesh, Hunter) – 18:43 →
2. "Caution (Do Not Stop on Tracks)" (Grateful Dead) – 11:30 →
3. "Feedback" (Grateful Dead) – 4:01

Notes:

- While both the back cover and booklet list disc two, track one as "That's It for the Other One", the CD erroneously lists it as simply "The Other One", credited to Weir and Kreutzmann.
- "(Walk Me Out in the) Morning Dew" ends abruptly as the power in the venue was cut off due to curfew.
- The bonus disc features performances from the previous night. These tracks are also included in the bonus material for the 2001 reissue of Anthem of the Sun.

== Personnel ==
Grateful Dead

- Jerry Garcia – guitar, vocals
- Phil Lesh – bass, vocals
- Ron "Pigpen" McKernan – keyboards, harmonica, vocals
- Bob Weir – guitar, vocals
- Bill Kreutzmann – percussion
- Mickey Hart – percussion

Production

- Dan Healy – producer
- Jeffrey Norman – engineer
- Don Pearson – engineer
- Joe Gastwirt – mastering
- Dick Latvala – tape archivist
- Timothy Harris – cover art

== Charts ==
Chart (1992)	Peak position
US Billboard 200	119
