= Born Cross-Eyed =

Single by Grateful Dead

from the album Anthem of the Sun
- A-side: "Dark Star"
- Released: April 1968 (US); 1977 (UK)
- Recorded: 1968
- Genre: Psychedelic rock; acid rock
- Length: 2:54
- Label: Warner Bros. (US); WEA Records Ltd (UK)
- Songwriter: Bob Weir
- Producers: Grateful Dead; David Hassinger

Grateful Dead singles chronology
"'The Golden Road (To Unlimited Devotion)/Cream Puff War'" (1967)	"Born Cross-Eyed" (1968)	"'Dupree's Diamond Blues/Cosmic Charlie'" (1969)

"Born Cross-Eyed" is an original composition by the San Francisco psychedelic rock group Grateful Dead. It was written by rhythm guitarist Bob Weir during the band's sessions creating the album Anthem of the Sun, produced by David Hassinger, in 1968. It was released as a B-side with the single "Dark Star", one of the band's best-known musical excursions.

The single was first released in April 1968 by Warner Bros. Records and is a different mix than the version included on the Anthem of the Sun album. The single was re-released in the United Kingdom in 1977 as a promotion distributed with the Dark Star magazine. The single release included lyrics of "Dark Star" on the back cover. While writing the single Weir said he wanted the abrupt, brief breaks in the music to sound like "thick air". The band had lots of strange experimenting during the songwriting process which irritated producer Dave Hassinger so much that he left the studio. David Dodd believes this happened right around 1:32 in the song, just before the lyrics "my how lovely you are, my dear".

This single version of the song would be later released as part of the compilation album What a Long Strange Trip It's Been by Warner Bros. in 1977, the twelve-CD retrospective box set The Golden Road (1965-1973) in 2001, released by Rhino Records (a subsidiary of Warner Bros.), and the 2003 re-release of Anthem of the Sun by Rhino.

== Albums ==
The alternate cover sleeve of the single that was released in the United Kingdom.

The following are the albums on which the song has appeared:

Studio albums

- Anthem of the Sun, Grateful Dead, 1968

Live albums

- Dick's Picks Volume 22, Grateful Dead, 2001
- Road Trips Volume 2, Number 2, Grateful Dead, 2009

Compilation/Box sets

- Some Of Our Best Friends Are, Various Artists, 1969
- The Grateful Dead/Anthem Of The Sun, Grateful Dead, 1976
- What a Long Strange Trip It's Been, Grateful Dead, 1977
- The Golden Road (1965-1973), Grateful Dead, 2001
