= Road Trips Volume 4 Number 3 =

Live album by Grateful Dead
- Released: April 26, 2011
- Recorded: November 21, 1973
- Genre: Rock
- Length: 224:22 bonus disc: 78:13
- Label: Rhino
- Producer: Grateful Dead

Grateful Dead chronology
Flashback with the Grateful Dead (2011)	Road Trips Volume 4 Number 3 (2011)	Road Trips Volume 4 Number 4 (2011)

Alternative cover
- Road Trips 2011 Bonus Disc

Road Trips Volume 4 Number 3 is a live album by the rock band the Grateful Dead. Subtitled Denver '73, it contains the complete concert recorded on November 21, 1973, at Denver Coliseum in Denver, Colorado. It also includes three songs recorded the previous night at the same venue. The 15th of the Road Trips series of archival albums, it was released as a three-disc CD on April 26, 2011.

A bonus disc was included with the album in shipments to customers who had pre-ordered all four 2011 Road Trips albums. The bonus disc was recorded on December 6, 1973, at Public Auditorium in Cleveland, Ohio.

== Critical reception ==
Professional ratings
Review scores
Source	Rating
The Music Box	4/5 stars

Writing in The Music Box, John Metzger said, "So, why is it that with all of the music that the Grateful Dead has dispensed, it took until 2011 for the band to issue its performance at the Denver Coliseum on November 21, 1973? Beautifully presented along with a handful of selections from the show that was held on the previous night, Road Trips, Vol. 4, No. 3: Denver '73 is, to put it quite bluntly, the best release that the Grateful Dead has issued in a long time.... Good fortune undeniably was smiling upon the audience... Not only did the band deliver a musical performance that was rock-solid, but it also assembled a well-paced show that peaked in all of the right places. Much as the cover art... suggests, the Grateful Dead galloped across the Wild West with guns a-blazin' as it painted images of outlaws on the run from life and love."

== Track listing ==
=== Disc one ===
November 21 – First set:

1. "Me and My Uncle" (John Phillips) – 3:29
2. "Sugaree" (Jerry Garcia, Robert Hunter) – 7:41
3. "Jack Straw" (Bob Weir, Hunter) – 5:13
4. "Dire Wolf" (Garcia, Hunter) – 4:26
5. "Black-Throated Wind" (Weir, John Perry Barlow) – 6:51
6. "Big Railroad Blues" (Noah Lewis, arranged by Grateful Dead) – 5:31
7. "Mexicali Blues" (Weir, Barlow) – 3:48
8. "They Love Each Other" (Garcia, Hunter) – 5:37
9. "Looks Like Rain" (Weir, Barlow) – 7:35
10. "Here Comes Sunshine" (Garcia, Hunter) – 11:08
11. "Big River" (Johnny Cash) – 5:22
12. "Brokedown Palace" (Garcia, Hunter) – 5:53

=== Disc two ===
November 21 – First set:

1. "Weather Report Suite" – 14:53
  - "Prelude" (Weir)
  - "Part 1" (Weir, Eric Andersen)
  - "Let It Grow" (Weir, Barlow)

November 21 – Second set:

2. "Mississippi Half-Step Uptown Toodeloo" (Garcia, Hunter) – 7:59 >
3. "Playing in the Band" (Weir, Mickey Hart, Hunter) – 11:57 >
4. "El Paso" (Marty Robbins) – 3:57 >
5. "Playing in the Band" (Weir, Hart, Hunter) – 4:30 >
6. "Wharf Rat" (Garcia, Hunter) – 8:07 >
7. "Playing in the Band" (Weir, Hart, Hunter) – 13:21 >
8. "Morning Dew" (Bonnie Dobson, Tim Rose) – 12:37

=== Disc three ===
November 21 – Second set:

1. "Truckin' " (Garcia, Phil Lesh, Weir, Hunter) – 10:23 >
2. "Nobody's Fault but Mine" (traditional, arranged by Grateful Dead) – 3:00 >
3. "Goin' Down the Road Feeling Bad" (traditional, arranged by Grateful Dead) – 8:42 >
4. "One More Saturday Night" (Weir) – 5:23

November 21 – Encore:

5. "Uncle John's Band" (Garcia, Hunter) – 7:39

November 20 – Second set:

6. "Truckin'" (Garcia, Lesh, Weir, Hunter) – 12:05 >
7. "The Other One" (Weir, Bill Kreutzmann) – 19:22 >
8. "Stella Blue" (Garcia, Hunter) – 7:42

=== 2011 Bonus Disc ===
December 6, 1973, Public Auditorium, Cleveland, Ohio:

1. "Greatest Story Ever Told" (Hart, Weir, Hunter) – 5:42
2. "China Cat Sunflower" (Garcia, Hunter) – 9:18 >
3. "I Know You Rider" (traditional, arranged by Grateful Dead) – 5:31
4. "Dark Star" (Garcia, Hart, Kreutzmann, Lesh, Ron "Pigpen" McKernan, Weir, Hunter) – 43:33 >
5. "Eyes of the World" (Garcia, Hunter) – 14:03

== Personnel ==
=== Grateful Dead ===
- Jerry Garcia – lead guitar, vocals
- Donna Jean Godchaux – vocals
- Keith Godchaux – keyboards
- Bill Kreutzmann – drums
- Phil Lesh – electric bass, vocals
- Bob Weir – rhythm guitar, vocals

=== Production ===
- Produced by Grateful Dead
- Produced for release by David Lemieux and Blair Jackson
- Recorded by Kidd Candelario
- CD mastering by Jeffrey Norman
- Cover art by Scott McDougall
- Photos by Grant Gouldon
- Package design by Steve Vance
- Liner notes essay "Rocky Mountain High" by Blair Jackson

== Set lists ==
Following are the full set lists from the November 20 and 21, 1973 concerts at Denver Coliseum.

Tuesday, November 20

- First set: "Ramble On Rose", "Mexicali Blues", "Don't Ease Me In", "Black-Throated Wind", "Brown-Eyed Women", "Beat it on Down the Line", "To Lay Me Down", "The Race Is On", "They Love Each Other", "Me and Bobby McGee", "Tennessee Jed", "Big River", "Row Jimmy", "Weather Report Suite Prelude" > "Weather Report Suite Part 1" > "Let It Grow", "Casey Jones"
- Second set: "Promised Land" > "Bertha" > "Greatest Story Ever Told", "Mississippi Half-Step Uptown Toodeloo" > "Dire Wolf", "Looks Like Rain", "China Cat Sunflower" > "I Know You Rider", "Truckin' "* > "The Other One"* > "Stella Blue"* > "Sugar Magnolia"
- Encore: "Uncle John's Band"

Wednesday, November 21

- First set: "Me and My Uncle"*, "Sugaree"*, "Jack Straw"*, "Dire Wolf"*, "Black-Throated Wind"*, "Big Railroad Blues"*, "Mexicali Blues"*, "They Love Each Other"*, "Looks Like Rain"*, "Here Comes Sunshine"*, "Big River"*, "Brokedown Palace"*, "Weather Report Suite Prelude"* > "Weather Report Suite Part 1"* > "Let It Grow"*
- Second set: "Mississippi Half-Step Uptown Toodeloo"* > "Playing in the Band"* > "El Paso"* > "Playing in the Band"* > "Wharf Rat"* > "Playing in the Band"* > "Morning Dew"*, "Truckin' "* > "Nobody's Fault but Mine"* > "Goin' Down the Road Feeling Bad"* > "One More Saturday Night"*
- Encore: "Uncle John's Band"*

* Included in Road Trips Volume 4 Number 3
