= Dick's Picks Volume 36 =

Live album by Grateful Dead
- Released: October 2005
- Recorded: September 21, 1972
- Venues: The Spectrum, Philadelphia
- Genres: Rock, country rock, jam
- Length: 279:10
- Label: Grateful Dead Records

Grateful Dead chronology
Grateful Dead Download Series Volume 6 (2005)	Dick's Picks Volume 36 (2005)	Grateful Dead Download Series Volume 7 (2005)

Professional ratings
Review scores
Source	Rating
AllMusic	4.5/5 stars
The Music Box	4.5/5 stars
TheBestOfWebsite	A+

Dick's Picks Volume 36 is the 36th and last installment of the Dick's Picks series of Grateful Dead concert recordings. It is a four-CD set. This release contains the Dead's complete show recorded on September 21, 1972 at The Spectrum in Philadelphia, Pennsylvania. It also includes three bonus tracks from September 3, 1972, at Folsom Field in Boulder, Colorado.

== Booklet, liner notes, and newspaper clippings ==
The release includes a 28-page booklet made of seven sheets of paper stapled together in the middle. The front duplicates the cover of the CD and the back features a color photograph of the band on stage in Boulder, CO on 9/3/72.

The booklet starts off with seven pages of liner notes and contains two newspaper clippings interspersed among several pages of photos of the band playing on stage. The last two pages list the contents of and credits for the release.

=== Liner notes by Bear ===
The liner notes were written by Owsley "Bear" Stanley on 9/26/05 and are entitled "Notes: on sound, my theories and my techniques". Accompanied by a few small black-and-white photographs of the band members, the essay is true to its title, offering a detailed description of how Bear, the band's soundman, set up the public address systems the band used in its shows along with why he used these techniques.

Technical details fill these notes, and the author demonstrates an appreciation of the acoustics of the venues and the brains of the people in the audience. For example, at one point Stanley writes that "This is simple physics. Sound travels through air at a speed of one foot/millisecond, and human ears are set 1/2 foot apart, giving us a discrimination of 1/2 millisecond max in arrival of sound in each ear. It is this sense for arrival time (phase/delay) which is used to determine direction."

Sound engineers may appreciate these technical details more than most people, but Bear is apparently writing for an audience of regular fans. He closes his piece by writing he "hope[s] all this chatter is of some interest—or better, use—to you, the reader of these notes. I also hope you enjoy this album."

=== Newspaper clippings ===
The booklet includes two newspaper clippings, but does not reveal when or where the reviews appeared.

The first clipping features a review by Jonathan Takiff entitled "Grateful Dead leaves 'em alive, thankful". Writing that "Fifteen, 25, 40-minute jams pass without a time sense because there is no waste, no sense of repetition", the tone of the piece is very positive and the author demonstrates a solid understanding of the band, its music and fans, and the overall scene. Published in Philadelphia Daily News, September 22, 1972, the second clipping features a review by Ralph P. Bobb entitled " 'Dead' make Phila. more bearable". Asking rhetorically "What makes Greatful [sic] Dead concerts so enjoyable?" the author explains that "The Dead is one group which can experiment with their music during a live concert and make it sound like a polished product."

== Caveat emptor ==
Each volume of Dick's Picks has its own "caveat emptor" label, advising the listener of the sound quality of the recording. The one for volume 36 reads:

"Dick's Picks Vol. 36 was mastered from the original 1/4" analog sonic journal tapes recorded at 7.5 ips, and were not produced with commercial intentions. However, due to the masterful skill of the recordist, these tapes sound remarkably rich and true to the live sound. Being more than thirty years old, the tapes exhibit some minor signs of the ravages of time, as we all do, but rest assured that everything possible has been done to make them sound as good as possible."

== Artwork ==
The album cover art for Dick's Picks Volume 36 was created by Bob Minkin. Drawn with the aid of computer software, it depicts an abstract image, and is part of a series of similar art works used for Dick's Picks volumes 31 through 36. Minkin is a San Francisco-based graphic designer who received a BFA degree from the School of Visual Arts in New York City.

== Track listing ==
=== Disc one ===
First set:

1. "Promised Land" (Chuck Berry) – 3:50
2. "Bird Song" (Jerry Garcia, Robert Hunter) – 13:40
3. "El Paso" (Marty Robbins) – 5:06
4. "China Cat Sunflower" > (Garcia, Hunter) – 5:28
5. "I Know You Rider" (traditional, arranged by Grateful Dead) – 6:49
6. "Black-Throated Wind" (Bob Weir, John Barlow) – 6:47
7. "Big Railroad Blues" (Noah Lewis, arranged by Grateful Dead) – 4:02
8. "Jack Straw" (Weir, Hunter) – 4:52
9. "Loser" (Garcia, Hunter) – 7:12
10. "Big River" (Johnny Cash) – 4:42

=== Disc two ===
1. "Ramble On Rose" (Garcia, Hunter) – 6:34
2. "Cumberland Blues" (Garcia, Phil Lesh, Hunter) – 7:40
3. "Playing in the Band" (Weir, Mickey Hart, Hunter) – 16:47

Second set:

4. "He's Gone" (Garcia, Hunter) – 14:18
5. "Truckin' " (Garcia, Lesh, Weir, Hunter) – 11:51
6. "Black Peter" (Garcia, Hunter) – 9:39
7. "Mexicali Blues" (Weir, Barlow) – 3:26

=== Disc three ===
1. "Dark Star" > (Garcia, Hart, Bill Kreutzmann, Lesh, Ron "Pigpen" McKernan, Weir, Hunter) – 37:08
2. "Morning Dew" (Bonnie Dobson, Tim Rose) – 12:10
3. "Beat It On Down the Line" (Jesse Fuller) – 3:34
4. "Mississippi Half-Step Uptown Toodeloo" (Garcia, Hunter) – 10:02
5. "Sugar Magnolia" (Weir, Hunter) – 8:30
6. "Friend of the Devil" (Garcia, John Dawson, Hunter) – 3:37

=== Disc four ===
1. "Not Fade Away" > (Buddy Holly, Norman Petty) – 5:57
2. "Goin' Down the Road Feeling Bad" > (traditional, arranged by Grateful Dead) – 7:26
3. "Not Fade Away" reprise (Hardin, Petty) – 3:31

Encore:

4. "One More Saturday Night" (Weir) – 4:56

Bonus tracks – September 3, 1972, Folsom Field, Boulder, Colorado:

5. "He's Gone" > (Garcia, Hunter) – 10:30
6. "The Other One" > (Weir, Kreutzmann) – 28:57
7. "Wharf Rat" (Garcia, Hunter) – 10:16

== Personnel ==
=== Grateful Dead ===
- Jerry Garcia – lead guitar, vocals
- Keith Godchaux – keyboards
- Donna Jean Godchaux – vocals
- Bill Kreutzmann – drums
- Phil Lesh – electric bass, vocals
- Bob Weir – rhythm guitar, vocals

=== Production ===
- Owsley Stanley – recording
- David Lemieux – tape archivist
- Jeffrey Norman – CD mastering
- Eileen Law – archival research
- Bear (Owsley Stanley) – liner notes
- Bob Minkin – cover art and package design
- Brian Blauser – photography
- Deb Trist – photography
- Jim Thrower – photography
- Grateful Dead Archives – photography
