= Road Trips Volume 4 Number 4 =

Live album by Grateful Dead
- Released: August 1, 2011
- Recorded: April 6, 1982
- Genre: Rock
- Length: 222:42 (3:42:42)
- Label: Rhino
- Producer: Grateful Dead

Grateful Dead chronology
Road Trips Volume 4 Number 3 (2011)	Road Trips Volume 4 Number 4 (2011)	Europe '72: The Complete Recordings (2011)

Road Trips Volume 4 Number 4 is a live album by the rock band the Grateful Dead. Subtitled Spectrum 4–6–82, it includes the complete concert recorded on April 6, 1982, at the Spectrum in Philadelphia, Pennsylvania. It also includes seven songs recorded the previous night at the same venue. The 16th of the Road Trips series of archival albums, it was released as a three-disc CD on August 1, 2011.

At the time, this was only the second live Dead album release that had been recorded in 1982; the other being Dick's Picks Volume 32. The year 2016 saw the release of the show from July 31 as part of the 30 Trips Around the Sun boxset. Two further shows (September 21 and 22) were released in 2022 as part of the In and Out of the Garden: Madison Square Garden '81, '82, '83 boxset. As of 2024 these are the only shows released from this year.

== Critical reception ==
In Relix, Glenn BurnSilver wrote, "At the core of this latest Road Trips offering comes a well-known and revered concert: Philadelphia Spectrum, April 6, 1982. From the opening notes of a bustling "Cold Rain and Snow," it's clear that the band is in synch with a dynamic energy and flow that only escalates as the night lengthens and the set list intensifies. It's as if Bob Weir and Jerry Garcia attempt to progressively one up each other with every number.... The one disappointment here (and on other Road Trips ) is filler placement on disc two... Wouldn't it have worked better to keep the main show going through disc two... and put all the filler at the end of disc three?"

== Track listing ==
=== Disc one ===
April 6 – First set:

1. "Cold Rain and Snow" (traditional, arranged by Grateful Dead) – 6:05 >
2. "Promised Land" (Chuck Berry) – 5:22
3. "Candyman" (Jerry Garcia, Robert Hunter) – 6:28
4. "C.C. Rider" (traditional, arranged by Grateful Dead) – 8:49
5. "Brown-Eyed Women" (Garcia, Hunter) – 5:36
6. "Mama Tried" (Merle Haggard) – 2:24 >
7. "Mexicali Blues" (Bob Weir, John Barlow) – 4:50
8. "Big Railroad Blues" (Noah Lewis) – 4:01
9. "Looks Like Rain" (Weir, Barlow) – 8:50
10. "Jack-A-Roe" (traditional, arranged by Grateful Dead) – 4:55
11. "It's All Over Now" (Bobby Womack, Shirley Womack) – 6:59
12. "Might As Well" (Garcia, Hunter) – 4:24

=== Disc two ===
April 6 – Second set:

1. "Shakedown Street" (Garcia, Hunter) – 13:16 >
2. "Lost Sailor" (Weir, Barlow) - 6:20 >
3. "Saint of Circumstance" (Weir, Barlow) - 6:32 >
4. "Terrapin Station" (Garcia, Hunter) - 11:58 >
5. "Rhythm Devils" (Mickey Hart, Bill Kreutzmann) – 12:07 >
6. "Space" (Garcia, Phil Lesh, Weir) – 8:49 >

April 5 – First set:

7. "Deep Elem Blues" (traditional, arranged by Grateful Dead) - 6:02
8. "Althea" (Garcia, Hunter) – 8:26
9. "Man Smart, Woman Smarter" (Norman Span) - 5:51

=== Disc three ===
April 6 – Second set:

1. "Truckin' " (Garcia, Lesh, Weir, Hunter) – 6:42 >
2. "The Other One" (Weir, Kreutzmann) – 2:11 >
3. "Morning Dew" (Bonnie Dobson, Tim Rose) – 12:09 >
4. "Sugar Magnolia" (Weir, Hunter) – 8:52

April 6 – Encore:

5. "It's All Over Now, Baby Blue" (Bob Dylan) – 7:30

April 5 – Second set:

6. "Bertha" (Garcia, Hunter) – 6:44
7. "Playing in the Band" (Weir, Hart, Hunter) – 12:24 >
8. "Ship of Fools" (Garcia, Hunter) – 7:46 >
9. "Playing in the Band" (Weir, Hart, Hunter) – 10:06

== Personnel ==
=== Grateful Dead ===
- Jerry Garcia – lead guitar, vocals
- Mickey Hart – drums
- Bill Kreutzmann – drums
- Phil Lesh – electric bass
- Brent Mydland – keyboards, vocals
- Bob Weir – rhythm guitar, vocals

=== Production ===
- Produced for release by David Lemieux and Blair Jackson
- CD mastering by David Glasser at Airshow Mastering, Boulder, CO
- Recorded by Dan Healy
- Cover art by Scott McDougall
- Photos by Michael Mendelson and Bob Minkin
- Package design by Steve Vance
- Liner notes essay "Don't Tell Me This Town Ain't Got No Heart!" by Blair Jackson

== Set lists ==
Following are the full set lists from the April 5 and 6, 1982 concerts at the Spectrum.

Monday, April 5

- First set: "Jack Straw", "Friend of the Devil" > "El Paso", "Deep Elem Blues"*, "Cassidy", "Tennessee Jed" > "Little Red Rooster", "Althea"*, "Man Smart, Woman Smarter"*
- Second set: "Bertha"* > "Playing in the Band"* > "Ship of Fools"* > "Playing in the Band"* > "Drums" > "Space" > "The Wheel" > "Playing in the Band" > "Wharf Rat" > "Good Lovin' "
- Encore: "Don't Ease Me In"

Tuesday, April 6

- First set: "Cold Rain and Snow"* > "Promised Land"*, "Candyman"*, "C.C. Rider"*, "Brown-Eyed Women"*, "Mama Tried"* > "Mexicali Blues"*, "Big Railroad Blues"*, "Looks Like Rain"*, "Jack-A-Roe"*, "It's All Over Now"*, "Might As Well"*
- Second set: "Shakedown Street"* > "Lost Sailor"* > "Saint of Circumstance"* > "Terrapin Station"* > "Rhythm Devils"* > "Space"* > "Truckin' "* > "The Other One"* > "Morning Dew"* > "Sugar Magnolia"*
- Encore: "It's All Over Now, Baby Blue"*

* Included in Road Trips Volume 4 Number 4
