= Duane & Greg Allman =

Studio album by Duane Allman and Gregg Allman
- Released: May 1972
- Recorded: September 1968 at TK Studios, Hialeah, United States
- Genre: Rock
- Length: 29:24
- Label: Bold Records
- Producer: Steve Alaimo

Singles from Duane & Greg Allman
- 1. "Morning Dew" Released: 1972

Professional ratings
Review scores
Source	Rating
Allmusic	3/5 stars
Allmusic	2/5 stars

Duane & Greg Allman is an album credited to brothers Duane and Gregg Allman, released by Bold Records in May 1972. The release is essentially an album-length demo recording of the 31st of February, a Tallahassee-based folk rock band featuring drummer Butch Trucks, bassist David Brown, and guitarist Scott Boyer. The 31st of February formed in 1965 and released their first, self-titled album in 1968. This second recording, according to Trucks, was intended to be their second album. It features Duane Allman on guitar and Gregg Allman on vocals. The two had been performing with the 31st of February for several months.

It was recorded at TK Studios in the Miami suburb of Hialeah, Florida in September 1968. Steve Alaimo engineered the sessions and later claimed producer's credit. The album is notable for the first recording of "Melissa", which was later re-recorded with the Allman Brothers Band.

Bold Records released the opening track "Morning Dew" as a single in 1972, backed with "I'll Change for You". The single didn't make it into the record charts, but the album peaked at No. 129 on the Billboard Top LPs during an eight-week run on the chart. The album was re-released several times after 1972 on various record companies and with varying cover art in various countries, including Germany and Japan, and is currently available digitally and on streaming services under the corrected title Duane and Gregg Allman.

== Subsequent re-recordings ==
In 1970, during his stint with the short-lived Derek and the Dominos, Duane Allman re-recorded "Nobody Knows You When You're Down and Out" for their Layla and Other Assorted Love Songs album. Two years later The Allman Brothers Band re-recorded "Melissa" for the 1972 album Eat a Peach. According to Gregg Allman's 2013 autobiography My Cross to Bear, Allman wrote "God Rest His Soul" as a tribute to Martin Luther King. He sold the rights to "God rest his soul" and "Melissa" to producer Steve Alaimo for $600.

== Track listing ==
=== Side one ===
1. "Morning Dew" (Tim Rose, Bonnie Dobson) – 3:45
2. "God Rest His Soul" (Gregg Allman) – 3:55
3. "Nobody Knows You When You're Down and Out" (Jimmy Cox) – 4:32
4. "Down in Texas" (Eddie Hinton, Marlon Greene) – 3:40
  - Incorrectly listed as "Come on Down and Get Me" (Ray Gerald)
5. "Melissa" (Gregg Allman, Steve Alaimo) – 3:15

=== Side two ===
1. "I'll Change for You" (David Brown) – 2:57
2. "Back Down Home with You" (David Brown) – 2:25
3. "Well I Know Too Well" (Steve Alaimo) – 2:15
4. "In The Morning When I'm Real" (Robert Pucetti) – 2:40

== Personnel ==
- Duane Allman – lead guitar
- Gregg Allman – organ, lead vocals
- Scott Boyer – acoustic guitar, vocals
- David Brown – bass
- Butch Trucks – drums, percussion

== Charts ==
Chart (1972)	Peak position
US Billboard Top LPs	129
