= Anthem of the Sun =

Studio album / Live album by Grateful Dead
- Released: July 18, 1968
- Recorded: September 1967 – March 31, 1968 (see Locations for more on these dates)
- Studio: Various
- Genres: Psychedelic rock; acid rock; sound collage
- Length: 38:57
- Labels: Warner Bros.-Seven Arts; Rhino Records
- Producers: Grateful Dead; David Hassinger

Grateful Dead chronology
The Grateful Dead (1967)	Anthem of the Sun (1968)	Aoxomoxoa (1969)

Anthem of the Sun is the second album by American rock band the Grateful Dead, released on July 18, 1968, by Warner Bros-Seven Arts. The album was assembled through a collage-like editing approach helmed by members Jerry Garcia and Phil Lesh (along with soundman Dan Healy), in which disparate studio and live performance tapes were blended together to create new hybrid recordings. The band supplemented their performances with instruments such as prepared piano, kazoo, harpsichord, timpani, trumpet, and güiro. The result was an experimental amalgam that is neither a pure studio album nor a live album. The band was joined by Tom Constanten, who contributed avant-garde instrumental and studio techniques influenced by composers John Cage and Karlheinz Stockhausen. It is the first album to feature second drummer Mickey Hart.

In 1972, an alternate mix of the album was released to capitalize on the band's recent success. A 2018 reissue on Rhino Records collects both the 1968 and 1972 mixes, along with a bonus disc featuring previously unrelaesed live recordings from 1967. The album was ranked number 288 on Rolling Stone magazine's list of the 500 greatest albums of all time, in both the 2003 and 2012 iterations of the list. It was voted number 376 in Colin Larkin's All Time Top 1000 Albums.

== Recording ==
The band entered American Studios in Los Angeles in November 1967 with David Hassinger, the producer of their eponymous debut album. However, determined to make a more complicated recorded work than their debut release, as well as attempt to translate their live sound into the studio, the band and Hassinger changed locations to New York City. By December they had gone through two other studios, Century Sound and Olmstead Studios (both "highly regarded eight-track studios").

Eventually, Hassinger grew frustrated with the group's slow recording pace and quit the project entirely while the band was at Century Sound, with only a third of the album completed. It has been reported that he left after guitarist Bob Weir requested creating the illusion of "thick air" in the studio by mixing recordings of silence taken in the desert and the city. Hassinger commented that "Nobody could sing [the new tracks recorded in NYC], and at that point they were experimenting too much in my opinion. They didn't know what the hell they were looking for." Garcia noted that "we want[ed] to learn how the studio work[ed]. We [didn't] want somebody else doing it. It's our music, we want[ed] to do it."

Returning to San Francisco's Coast Recorders, the band recruited their soundman, Dan Healy, to help produce. In between studio sessions, the band also began recording their live dates. Lesh commented that this was in part because the songs were not "road tested." Healy, Garcia, and Lesh then took these concert tapes (encompassing two Los Angeles shows from November 1967, a tour of the Pacific Northwest in January and early February 1968, and a California tour from mid-February to mid-March 1968) and began interlacing them with existing studio tracks. Garcia called this "mix[ing] it for the hallucinations". Kreutzmann explained, "Phil and Jerry were the ones who figured out that we could exploit studio technology to demonstrate how these songs were mirrors of infinity, even when they adhered to their established arrangements. It's the old paradox of 'improvisational compositions'. Jazz artists knew all about the balance between freedom and structure, but a few rock bands were now catching on. Most rock bands, however, tended to head in an opposite direction, afraid of the uncertainty of improvisation. We decided that Anthem of the Sun was going to be our statement on the matter". Drummer Bill Kreutzmann's description of the production process describes the listening experience of the album as well:

...Jerry [Garcia] and Phil [Lesh] went into the studio with [Dan] Healy and, like mad scientists, they started splicing all the versions together, creating hybrids that contained the studio tracks and various live parts, stitched together from different shows, all in the same song — one rendition would dissolve into another and sometimes they were even stacked on top of each other... It was easily our most experimental record, it was groundbreaking in its time, and it remains a psychedelic listening experience to this day."

Tom Constanten, a friend of Lesh and Garcia, joined the band in the studio while on leave from the United States Air Force to provide piano, prepared piano, and electronic tape effects influenced by John Cage and Stockhausen. Constanten would formally join the band following his discharge in November 1968; however, his contributions to the band's sound were more evident in the studio than in live shows, and Anthem of the Sun was no exception. Constanten developed piano pieces that sounded like three gamelan orchestras playing at once and created effects by setting a spinning gyroscope on the piano soundboard. Likewise, the rest of the band used a large assortment of instruments in the studio to augment the live tracks that were the base of each song, including kazoos, crotales, harpsichord, timpani, trumpet, and a güiro. Garcia commented that parts of the album were "far out, even too far out... We weren't making a record in the normal sense; we were making a collage." He also acknowledged the influence of Lesh's study of Stockhausen and other avant-gardists. Warner Bros. executive Joe Smith was noted as characterizing Anthem of the Sun as "the most unreasonable project with which we have ever involved ourselves."

Jerry Garcia's longtime friend and songwriting partner, Robert Hunter, had made his first lyrical contributions to the band the previous year for "Dark Star". He added words to the Lesh/Pigpen composition "Alligator" on this album.

== Locations ==
While no certain date for the beginning of recording is known, it is unlikely that any material was recorded before September 19, 1967, the date when Mickey Hart first played with the band. The melange of the final product makes it difficult to tell where many of the live excerpts listed in the credits were used. However, significant fragments of "Alligator" (e.g. the post-vocals "jam section") are known to come from the February 14, 1968, show at San Francisco's Carousel Ballroom (the venue that later became the Fillmore West). The "Alligator" vocal reprise is taken from November 10, 1967, at the Shrine Exposition Hall in Los Angeles. Similarly, the skeletal framework of "Caution (Do Not Stop on Tracks)" dates from the Shrine Auditorium on November 10, 1967, and the Carousel Ballroom on March 31, 1968. Excerpts from two shows at Kings Beach Bowl in Kings Beach, California, on February 23–24, 1968, that were used — most notably the car horn heard at the end of "Caution (Do Not Stop on Tracks)" — were later released on Dick's Picks Volume 22. Another show known to be sourced, from March 17, 1968, was released as Download Series Volume 6. Used from that performance were the verse(s) section of "The Faster We Go" portion of "That's It for the Other One", and the first half of the "New Potato Caboose" jam (after the vocals).

Studios used:

- RCA Victor Studio A, Los Angeles, California, September 1967
- American Recording Company, Los Angeles, California, October 1967
- Century Sound Studio, New York City, New York December 1967
- Olmstead Sound Studios, New York City, New York, December 1967
- Criteria Recording Studios, Miami, Florida, April 1968

Live tracks recorded at (according to liner notes):

- Shrine Exposition Hall, Los Angeles, California, November 10–11, 1967 (see also 30 Trips Around the Sun & the vinyl-only breakout release)
- Eureka Municipal Auditorium, Eureka, California, January 20, 1968 (see also Road Trips Volume 2 Number 2)
- Eagles Auditorium, Seattle, Washington, January 26–27, 1968
- Crystal Ballroom, Portland, Oregon, February 2–3, 1968 (see also Road Trips Volume 2 Number 2)
- Carousel Ballroom, San Francisco, California, February 14, March 15–17, March 29–31, 1968 (see also Download Series Volume 6)
- Kings Beach Bowl, Kings Beach, California, February 22–24, 1968 (see also Dick's Picks Volume 22)

The February 14, 1968, recording at Carousel Ballroom has been used to create sound patches for Moog Music's award-winning Animoog app.

Bonus tracks on the 2001/2003 reissue recorded at:

- Shrine Exposition, Los Angeles, California, August 23, 1968 (see also Two from the Vault)

== Composition ==
In the description of Hal Horowitz of American Songwriter, Anthem of the Sun is an "oblique sound collage" which Garcia said was "mixed... for hallucinations", resulting in a less commercial album than the group's debut record. Similarly, Michael Gallucci of Ultimate Classic Rock writes that the record is notable for the band's "earliest exploration of longer songs on record, as well as the combination of both live and studio recordings that were pieced together in a sort of sound collage that infuriated label bosses and opened the group to more experimental paths. Band biographer Joe S. Harrington also describes it as a sound collage of mixed live and studio performances which "sounded unlike anything else at the time."

Gene Santoro writes that the album took the Grateful Dead into "conceptual-art music, sonic collage, tape manipulations, lapping overdubs, and endless splices, parts inchoate and other parts brilliant as they learned the latest technology, the eight-track recording studio." He also comments that the band's jugband roots occasionally surface, such as with the intro of "Alligator", which features kazoos performed like a horn section. Q writer Johnny Black considers it to be one of numerous 1968 concept albums that applied different approaches to the use of "conceptuality" popularised by the Beatles' Sgt. Pepper's Lonely Hearts Club Band (1967), deeming it to be a "non-stop sound collage" that weaves the live and studio tracks with "sound effects and disjointed electronic compositions". Horowitz also comments that the album's original concept – to splice live and studio work together – was partly inspired by Sgt. Pepper and was "to push the confines of the album" further.

Rough Guides writer Ken Hunt credits Garcia for the project's direction, "deploying live and studio performances collage-fashion". He also highlighted Constanten's keyboardist work, saying that as the musician studied under the tuition of Stockhausen, Luciano Berio, Pierre Boulez and Henri Pousseur, he was "well versed in the piano's alternative voices – as Anthem's prepared piano and gyroscope-on-piano-strings death rattle remind." David Gans of Musician considers Anthem of the Sun to be the best example of Lesh's resurfaced pre-Grateful Dead influences, due to the "passages of musique concrète directly traceable to Berio's electronic music". One contemporary reviewer wrote: "It's continuous, with no bands between tracks. More a movement, even hymn — yes, anthem if you like." Simon Reynolds of The Wire describes both Anthem of the Sun and its follow-up Aoxomoxoa (1969) as containing "weird studio-as-instrument stuff".

Side one of the album comprises a suite to the author Neal Cassady, and features psychedelic lyrics, jazz-style musical motifs and frantic jamming, with sporadic touches of electronic music reminiscent of Edgard Varèse. "That's It for the Other One" is centred around a country-esque melody before a second movement debuts the album's splicing of live and studio work. Edwin Pouncey of The Wire writes that the song's latter part features Constanten's tape montage and prepared piano work, applied with "enthusiastic participation" from Garcia and Lesh. He adds: "Collaged from superimposed performance tapes, his experimental symphony suddenly folds into a bout of musique concrète that falls somewhere between Varèse's Déserts and the respective keyboard deconstructions of John Cage and Conlon Nancarrow." This passage of musique concrète segues into "New Potato Caboose". Side two commences with the "kazoo burlesque of "Alligator" before transitioning to more erratic territory, with guitar-based jamming and an outro of feedback. "Caution (Do Not Stop on Tracks)", considered the album's most curious song, transitions from a blues riff to "60-cycle hum and microphone feedback".

== Release ==
The front cover art, by Bill Walker, resembles a mandala and incorporates the likenesses of the band members' heads. The back cover features a circular fisheye group shot, photographed by Thomas Weir.

On the original pressing, all of the songs were credited to the band as a whole. Individual writing credits were subsequently published. In order to increase royalty points on the album, the band divided opening track "That's It for the Other One" into four somewhat arbitrary movements. The opening section, the Garcia-sung "Cryptical Envelopment", was dropped from live performances of the suite after 1971 (though it reappeared a few times in 1985). The second section, ostensibly a quodlibet (misspelled as "quadlibet"), is a short jam connecting to the main section, sung by Weir ("Spanish lady comes to me, she lays on me this rose"), with a short reprise of "Cryptical Envelopment". Though labeled as "The Faster We Go, the Rounder We Get", played live, Weir's section became known simply as "The Other One". The final section is a Constanten piece featuring the aforementioned prepared piano and sound effects (this section is missing from the album cover on original pressings).

The "Dark Star" single, released just prior to Anthem of the Sun, is not included on the album, but its B-side, "Born Cross-Eyed", is included in a stereo mix, without the "Feedback" ending.

Early pressings of the album include the phrase "The faster we go, the rounder we get" inscribed on the vinyl in the run-out matrix around the label area. This was the inspiration for Rounder Records' name.

The album was remastered for the 2001 box set The Golden Road. This version includes four bonus tracks (the single version of "Born Cross-Eyed" plus contemporaneous live tracks) and was issued separately in 2003.

The making of Anthem of the Sun, Aoxomoxoa, Workingman's Dead, and American Beauty is described by former members and associates of the Grateful Dead in the 1997 Classic Albums documentary Anthem to Beauty.

== Critical reception ==
=== Contemporary reviews ===
Anthem of the Sun received far more attention than the group's debut album, an achievement credited to the group's sabbatical in Mexico and the addition of Hart to the band's rhythm section, who made the group's sound harder. Rolling Stone reviewer Jim Miller commented on the fusion of studio and live work, describing it as a mix of "the carefully crafted" and "the casually tossed off" with the results being spliced together. "The end product," he wrote, "is one of the finest albums to come out of San Francisco, a personal statement of the rock aesthetic on a level with the Jefferson Airplane's After Bathing at Baxter's." He added that while there are some weak moments, with the vocals being a consistent problem, overall the album is "remarkably successful".

A reviewer for Disc and Music Echo wrote that Anthem of the Sun lived up to the hype around the band, calling it "so completely unlike anything you ever heard before that it's practically a new concept in music. It's haunting, it's pretty, it's infinite — and then zap and it's explosive and a complete mind-blower." They added that the group had grown beyond the ordinary blues of their debut album to the "very front rank" of progressive bands, concluding that "Anthem of the Sun is undoubtedly one of the five great albums of 1968." Lou Weinstein of The Lexington Herald wrote that the album has much to offer for fans of psychedelic rock, commenting that the group "have certainly established themselves" and forged their own sound. Victoria Daily Times writer Russell Freethy grouped Anthem of the Sun alongside The Collectors' eponymous album and Jefferson Airplane's Crown of Creation for containing "[t]he best in electronic rock".

Abilene Reporter-News reviewer Lynn Taylor believes that despite the excitement around the group, the appeal wears off quickly as it "takes a special sort of appetite" to play the entire album, adding: "It takes considerable thought to understand what the Dead are trying to say, and mostly it isn't worth the trouble." James Belsey of Bristol's Evening Post panned the record, saying that compared to Jimi Hendrix, the Grateful Dead sound like "amateurs set loose in the world of weird music". Although believing much of the record to be poor, he enjoyed the "one semi-subtle moment of electronic music" during "That's It for the Other One". In his review, Barry Miles of International Times wrote that the group were so submerged in the underground and "community concept" that "individual virtuosity is sacrificed to group sound." He believed that Anthem of the Sun resembled "background music to a revolution. Cool in a detached way, emotionless, dealing in psychic head energy flows," with imprints of the band's performances at the Acid Tests in their sound. He nonetheless said: "The music is from an extreme position, difficult to listen to with sympathy as 'revolution music' is now the thing and psychedelic music is 'out'." It ranked at joint 35th place in The Chicago Tribune's poll of the top 50 albums of 1968.

=== Retrospective ===
Professional ratings
Review scores
Source	Rating
AllMusic	4.5/5 stars
The Encyclopedia of Popular Music	5/5 stars
The Great Rock Discography	7/10
The Rolling Stone Album Guide	2/5 stars

Writing for New Musical Express in 1974, Nick Kent described "Anthem of the Sun as "a grandiose project unfortunately landed with an atrocious 'mix' that left it hamstrung as more of an intriguing experiment than an innovative success." He added that, in 1968, "if you wanted to believe desperately enough or maybe had the right inner chemical balance, Anthem of the Sun was the album to save the world. Now it amounts at least to the ears of this once-believer, to the sum of its individual parts and no more – like the Airplane's similarly experimental After Bathing at Baxter's, a muddled, but quaintly grandiose, acid curio." Also of the New Musical Express, Richard Cook stated in 1984 that Anthem of the Sun was an iconic album who stature had been eroded by time.

Writing for Record Collector, Luke Haines dismissed those who hailed the album as a "psych classic" upon release, writing: "With a production as flat as a medievalist's map of the world, Anthem of the Sun lopes along in a muffled, bluegrass phased-out blur, waddling in a gloopy soup in search of a riff." Kris Needs, also of Record Collector, was more favorable, describing Anthem of the Sun as "a mind-frying gumbo mixing live and studio recordings into an epic collage of psychedelic blowouts and stoner philosophy." In the third edition of The Rolling Stone Album Guide (1992), Paul Evans wrote of the album's "puzzling experimentalism", while in the 2004 fourth edition, Greg Kot dismissed it as "ambitious but awkward".

In a positive review for Mojo in 2002, Jon Savage described it as the album on which the Grateful Dead's reputation deservedly lies, writing: "Anthem of the Sun is a still dazzling montage of studio and live performances mixed with heavy air into a constantly shifting, multi-layered whole that, with Jimi Hendrix's '1983', represents the ultimate psychedelic production." He also believed its success was due to the "very disparity between its elements." AllMusic reviewer Lindsay Planer wrote that while uninitiated listeners could find the record "unnervingly difficult to follow," it nonetheless "obliterated the pretension of the post-Sgt. Pepper's 'concept album' while reinventing the musical parameters of the 12" LP medium." Planer noted that the band's intention "to create an aural pastiche from numerous sources – often running simultaneously – was a radical concept that allowed consumers worldwide to experience a simulated Dead performance firsthand."

In The Great Rock Discography (2006), Martin C. Strong wrote that the addition of Hart gave the band a "a more subtly complex rather than powerful sound", which – along with Constanten's avant-garde influences – added to the "psychedelic stew" displayed on Anthem of the Sun, saying: "An ambitious collage of live and studio pieces, the album was another flawed attempt to seize the essence of the elusive beast that was the band's live show." However, he praised the "bizarrely experimental sections with wonderful cod-hippy titles" which, he adds, alone make the album worth purchasing. Colin Larkin of The Encyclopedia of Popular Music (1997) considers it "much more satisfying" than the group's debut album, noting that "17 different concerts and four different live studios were used. The non-stop suite of ambitious segments with tantalizing titles [...] was an artistic success." He also praised the evocative artwork. In 2007, keyboardist Andrew Douglas Rothbard said in SF Weekly: "The fact that an anarchistic attempt at musique concrete like the Grateful Dead's Anthem of the Sun was released on a record label like Warner Brothers is astonishing to me."

=== Accolades ===
In 2003 and 2012, Rolling Stone ranked the album at number 288 on their list of the "500 Greatest Albums of All Time". It was also ranked at number 376 in Larkin's book All Time Top 1000 Albums (2000). In 2015, Ultimate Classic Rock included it in their list of "The 100 '60s Rock Albums", highlighting the "mad tinkering" in the part-live part-studio production and saying: "It's the ultimate trip album by a band that knew a thing or two about trips." "That's It for the Other One" was included in Mojo's 1997 list of "Psychedelia: The 100 Greatest Classics"; Savage wrote: "From the time when musicians talked about taping air, this 12-minute sequence mixes the thunder of the Dead in full flight with Phil Lesh’s musique concrete and a gorgeous guitar melody about seven minutes in, which by itself justifies Jerry Garcia’s reputation. A tour de force of editing and cross-fading, it carries the ambience of the moment like nothing else."

== Remix and alternate cover ==
Alternate cover of Anthem of the Sun

A remixed version of Anthem of the Sun, supervised by Phil Lesh, was issued in 1972 (with the same product number, WS-1749), and can be identified by the letters RE after the master numbers. The remix particularly differs from the original in terms of segues, use of live recordings, and stereo imaging. For example, the original mix starts with vocals and organ panned wide, while the remix has them centered; Bob Weir's studio vocal on the first track is doubled with a live recording on the original mix and solo on the remix. "Born Cross-Eyed" ends with a power chord in the key of E on the remix, whereas the original mix has an earlier fade-out.

Around the same time Jerry Garcia supervised a remix of the Grateful Dead's following album Aoxomoxoa. While the Aoxomoxoa remix was used for original Warner Bros and subsequent Rhino CD issues, the original mix of Anthem of the Sun was chosen for CD reissues.

In 2013 the Grateful Dead studio albums were remastered again for listening in digital high resolution. The 2013 download is the first digital issue of the Anthem of the Sun early '70s remix. Confusingly, the promotion for this reissue emphasized the use of original mixes (particularly those of the Workingman's Dead and American Beauty albums which had been remixed for previous high resolution digital releases). However, Anthem of the Sun and Aoxomoxoa appear in the 2013 HD release not in their original mixes, but in remixed form, as released in 1972.

As remix masters were not sent to the UK, vinyl pressings of the album in this region (and probably other foreign markets) continued to use the original mix after 1972.

When the album was reissued in 1975, Warner Brothers changed the background color on the front cover from midnight blue to white, and the stylized title was changed to a standard font. As the band had not approved the change, the following pressings reverted to blue.

On July 13, 2018 Rhino Records released the "50th Anniversary Deluxe Edition" of Anthem of the Sun, on two CDs. Disc one contains both mixes of the album – the one from 1968 and the one from 1971. Disc two contains previously unreleased live tracks from the Winterland Arena in San Francisco, recorded on October 22, 1967.

== Track listing ==
Side one
No.	Title	Writer(s)	Lead vocals	Length
1.	"That's It for the Other One"; I. "Cryptical Envelopment"; II. "Quadlibet for Tenderfeet"; III. "The Faster We Go, the Rounder We Get"; IV. "We Leave the Castle"	Grateful Dead; Jerry Garcia: Garcia; Bill Kreutzmann; Phil Lesh; Ron McKernan; Bob Weir; Kreutzmann; Weir; Tom Constanten	Garcia instrumental: Weir; Garcia; instrumental	7:40
2.	"New Potato Caboose"	Lesh; Robert Petersen	Weir	8:26
3.	"Born Cross-Eyed"	Weir	Weir	2:04
Total length:				18:10

Side two
No.	Title	Writer(s)	Lead vocals	Length
1.	"Alligator"	Lesh; McKernan; Robert Hunter	McKernan	11:20
2.	"Caution (Do Not Stop on Tracks)"	Garcia; Kreutzmann; Lesh; McKernan; Weir	McKernan	9:37
Total length:				20:57

Note: On the 1972 remix, "Born Cross-Eyed" is extended to 2:27, and "Caution (Do Not Stop on Tracks)" is shortened to 8:58.

2001/2003 reissue bonus tracks
No.	Title	Length
6.	"Alligator" (live)	18:43 (Note: Recorded August 23, 1968. Also released on the bonus disc of Two from the Vault.)
7.	"Caution (Do Not Stop on Tracks)" (live)	11:38
8.	"Feedback" (live)	6:58
9.	"Born Cross-Eyed" (single version)	2:55
Total length:		40:14 79:15

=== 50th Anniversary Deluxe Edition ===
Disc two - October 22, 1967 - Winterland Ballroom - San Francisco, California
No.	Title	Writer(s)	Length
1.	"Morning Dew"	Bonnie Dobson, Tim Rose	7:38
2.	"New Potato Caboose"	Lesh, Petersen	9:49
3.	"It Hurts Me Too"	Elmore James, Marshall Sehorn	4:16
4.	"Cold Rain and Snow"	Traditional, arranged by Grateful Dead	3:16
5.	"Turn On Your Lovelight"	Joseph Scott, Deadric Malone	12:16
6.	"Beat It On Down the Line"	Jesse Fuller	2:58
7.	"That's It for the Other One"	Garcia, Weir, Kreutzmann: I. Cryptical Envelopment (Garcia); II The Other One (Weir, Kreutzmann); III. Cryptical Envelopment (Garcia)	14:47
Total length:			55:10 94:01

Notes:

- Disc one, tracks 6–8 recorded live on August 23, 1968. Also released as the bonus disc of Two from the Vault.

== Personnel ==
Grateful Dead

- Jerry Garcia – lead guitar, acoustic guitar, kazoo, vibraslap, vocals, co-lead vocals on "That's It for the Other One" and "Born Cross-Eyed"
- Bob Weir – rhythm guitar, 12-string guitar, acoustic guitar, kazoo, vocals, lead vocals on "New Potato Caboose", co-lead vocals on "That's It for the Other One" and "Born Cross-Eyed"
- Ron "Pigpen" McKernan – Hammond and Vox Continental organs, celesta, claves, vocals, lead vocals on "Alligator" and "Caution"
- Phil Lesh – bass guitar, trumpet, harpsichord, kazoo, piano, timpani, vocals
- Mickey Hart – drums, orchestra bells, gong, chimes, crotales, prepared piano, finger cymbals
- Bill Kreutzmann – drums, glockenspiel, gong, chimes, crotales, prepared piano, finger cymbals

Additional personnel

- Tom Constanten – prepared piano, piano, electronic tape

Production

- Grateful Dead – producers, arrangers
- David Hassinger – producer
- Dan Healy – executive engineer
- Bob Matthews – assistant engineer

Reissue technical personnel

- James Austin – production
- Joe Gastwirt – mastering, production consultation
- Michael Wesley Johnson – associate production, research coordination
- Cassidy Law – project coordination, Grateful Dead Archive
- Eileen Law – archival research, Grateful Dead Archives
- David Lemieux – production
- Peter McQuaid – executive production, Grateful Dead Productions
- Jeffrey Norman – additional mixing on bonus tracks

== Chart positions ==
Chart (1968)	Peak position
US Billboard Top LP's	87
US Cash Box Top 100 Albums	101
US Record World 100 Top LP's	69

== See also ==
- San Francisco Sound
