= Anthem to Beauty =

1998 music documentary

- Anthem to Beauty DVD cover
- Directed by: Jeremy Marre
- Starring: Grateful Dead
- Edited by: Phil McDonald
- Distributed by: Rhino Home Video
- Release date: January 27, 1998
- Running time: 75 minutes
- Language: English

Anthem to Beauty is a music documentary about the making of the Grateful Dead albums Anthem of the Sun and American Beauty. It originally aired in a somewhat shortened version in 1997 as part of the television series Classic Albums. It was released on VHS videotape in 1998 and on DVD in 1999, with a running time of 1 hour and 15 minutes.

== Synopsis ==
The video combines footage from the early years of the Grateful Dead with 1997 interviews of former band members and associates. Phil Lesh, Mickey Hart, Bob Weir, Robert Hunter, and David Grisman, among others, discuss the creation of 1968's experimental, psychedelic Anthem of the Sun and 1970's folk-rock classic American Beauty. They also listen to and analyze the original master recordings for the albums, and talk about being in (or working with) the Grateful Dead at that time. Recording engineer Stephen Barncard rolls the original master tape and solos tracks, recalling the recording sessions and highlighting specific moments.

Keyboardist Tom Constanten discusses the artificiality of appearing on Hugh Hefner's show Playboy After Dark. David Grisman plays his full version of the mandolin part for Ripple, as he had intended.

== Track listing ==
The track listing for the DVD release is:

1. Introduction
2. "Truckin'" (Garcia, Hunter, Lesh, Weir)
3. "Candyman" (Garcia, Hunter)
4. Celebration
5. American Beauty Album Cover Creation
6. 1965 — Beginnings
7. Neal Cassady
8. A Record Contract on Their Own Terms
9. "The Other One" (Kreutzmann, Weir)
10. Tom Constanten
11. Anthem of the Sun Album Cover Creation
12. "Born Cross-Eyed" (Weir)
13. David Crosby
14. "Mountains of the Moon" (Garcia, Hunter)
15. "St. Stephen" (Garcia, Hunter, Lesh)
16. "China Cat Sunflower" (Garcia, Hunter)
17. "Attics of My Life" (Garcia, Hunter)
18. "Friend of the Devil" (Garcia, Dawson, Hunter)
19. "Ripple" (Garcia, Hunter)
20. "Sugar Magnolia" (Weir, Hunter)
21. "Box of Rain" (Lesh, Hunter)
22. "Brokedown Palace" (Garcia, Hunter)
23. End credits

== Credits ==
- Jeremy Marre – director
- Nick de Grunwald, Bous de Jong – executive producers
- Caroline Thomas – series associate producer
- Chips Chipperfield – series consultant
- Terry Shand, Geoff Kempin – executive producers for Castle Music Pictures
- Phil McDonald – editor
- Joel Wykeham – series production manager
- Mike Shoring – sound recordist
- Richard Gibb, Mike Elwell – camera
- David Gans – consultant
