= Flashback with the Grateful Dead =

Compilation album by Grateful Dead
- Released: April 5, 2011
- Recorded: 1969–1989
- Genre: Rock
- Length: 51:52
- Label: Flashback

Grateful Dead chronology
Road Trips Volume 4 Number 2 (2011)	Flashback with the Grateful Dead (2011)	Road Trips Volume 4 Number 3 (2011)

Flashback with the Grateful Dead is an album by the rock band the Grateful Dead. It contains ten songs, selected from eight of their studio albums that were originally released between 1969 and 1989. The compilation was released on CD on the Flashback label, a subsidiary of Rhino Records, on April 5, 2011.

== Critical reception ==
Professional ratings
Review scores
Source	Rating
Allmusic	3/5 stars

On Allmusic, Steve Leggett said, "This ten-song budget compilation can hardly begin to catch the whole ragged familial appeal of the Dead, but it does, given its brevity, provide snapshots of the band at different points in time, which makes it a pretty nice and low-priced purchase for the absolute novice fan. Deadheads will already have every song here ten times over and in countless versions."

== Track listing ==
No.	Title	Writer(s)	Original album	Length
1.	"Truckin'"	Jerry Garcia, Phil Lesh, Bob Weir, Robert Hunter	American Beauty (1970)	5:04
2.	"China Cat Sunflower"	Garcia, Hunter	Aoxomoxoa (1969)	3:41
3.	"Unbroken Chain"	Lesh, Robert Petersen	From the Mars Hotel (1974)	6:45
4.	"U.S. Blues"	Garcia, Hunter	From the Mars Hotel (1974)	4:40
5.	"The Music Never Stopped"	Weir, John Perry Barlow	Blues for Allah (1975)	4:36
6.	"Shakedown Street"	Garcia, Hunter	Shakedown Street (1978)	4:59
7.	"Alabama Getaway"	Garcia, Hunter	Go to Heaven (1980)	3:37
8.	"Throwing Stones"	Weir, Barlow	In the Dark (1987)	7:21
9.	"Standing on the Moon"	Garcia, Hunter	Built to Last (1989)	5:22
10.	"Touch of Grey"	Garcia, Hunter	In the Dark (1987)	5:47

== Personnel ==
Grateful Dead

- Jerry Garcia – guitar, vocals
- Bob Weir – guitar, vocals
- Phil Lesh – bass, vocals
- Bill Kreutzmann – drums
- Mickey Hart – drums on "Truckin'", "China Cat Sunflower", "The Music Never Stopped", "Shakedown Street", "Alabama Getaway", "Throwing Stones", "Standing on the Moon", "Touch of Grey"
- Ron "Pigpen" McKernan – keyboards, percussion on "Truckin'", "China Cat Sunflower"
- Tom Constanten – keyboards on "China Cat Sunflower"
- Keith Godchaux – keyboards on "Unbroken Chain", "U.S. Blues", "The Music Never Stopped", "Shakedown Street"
- Donna Jean Godchaux – vocals on "Unbroken Chain", "U.S. Blues", "The Music Never Stopped", "Shakedown Street"
- Brent Mydland – keyboards, vocals on "Alabama Getaway", "Throwing Stones", "Standing on the Moon", "Touch of Grey"

Additional musicians

- Howard Wales – organ on "Truckin'"
