= Fünf auf der nach oben offenen Richterskala =

Studio album by Einstürzende Neubauten
- Released: 1987
- Recorded: 1985–1987
- Genre: Industrial; experimental
- Length: 41:41
- Label: Some Bizzare
- Producer: Gareth Jones & Einstürzende Neubauten

Einstürzende Neubauten chronology
Halber Mensch (1985)	Fünf auf der nach oben offenen Richterskala (1987)	Haus der Lüge (1989)

Fünf auf der nach oben offenen Richterskala (English: Five on the open-ended Richter Scale) is the fourth full-length studio album by the German experimental rock band Einstürzende Neubauten, released in 1987 through Some Bizzare Records in the U.K. and What's So Funny About GmbH in Germany. It was reissued in 2002 through the band's own label, Potomak.

== Reception ==
Professional ratings
Review scores
Source	Rating
AllMusic	4.5/5 stars

Trouser Press, in an ambiguous review, described the album as "shockingly low-key." AllMusic described the album as "Einstürzende Neubauten at their unsettling, gripping, and tension-ridden best" and "the group's most subdued and measured work to that point, organic dark ambient that rarely utilized the chaos and cacaphony [sic] for which they had become known."

== Track listing ==
1. "Zerstörte Zelle" ("Destroyed Cell") – 8:02
2. "Morning Dew" – 4:56
3. "Ich bin's" ("It's Me") – 3:24
4. "MoDiMiDoFrSaSo" ("MonTueWedThuFriSatSun") – 4:51
5. "12 Städte" ("12 Cities") – 8:38
6. "Keine Schönheit (ohne Gefahr)" ("No Beauty Without Danger") – 5:10
7. "Kein Bestandteil sein" ("Not Being Part of It") – 6:43
8. "Adler kommt später" ("Eagle Comes Later") – 5:42*

Track 8 is a bonus track only available on the remastered re-release on Potomak/Indigo and is an early version of "Zerstörte Zelle".

== Personnel ==
Einstürzende Neubauten

- Blixa Bargeld – lead vocals, guitars
- Mark Chung – bass, vocals
- Alexander Hacke – guitar, vocals
- N.U. Unruh – percussion, vocals
- F.M. Einheit – percussion, vocals
