= Butch Trucks =

American drummer (1947–2017)

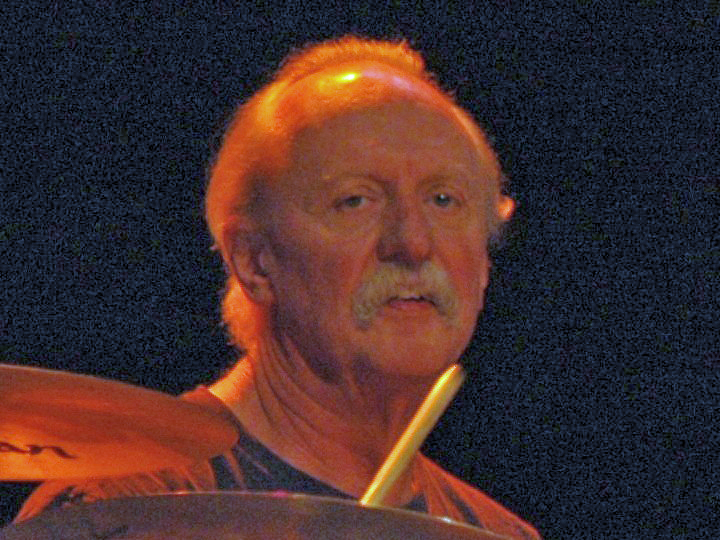
- Trucks in 2007

Background information
- Born: Claude Hudson Trucks; May 11, 1947; Jacksonville, Florida, U.S.
- Died: January 24, 2017 (aged 69) West Palm Beach, Florida, U.S.
- Genres: Rock, blues, Southern rock
- Occupations: Musician
- Instruments: Drums
- Years active: 1964–2017
- Label: Flying Frog

Claude Hudson "Butch" Trucks (May 11, 1947 – January 24, 2017) was an American drummer. He was best known as a founding member of the Allman Brothers Band, for which he was inducted into the Rock and Roll Hall of Fame in 1995. Trucks was born and raised in Jacksonville, Florida.

Prior to joining the Allman Brothers, Trucks played in various groups before forming the 31st of February as a student at Florida State University in Tallahassee, Florida, in the mid-1960s. He joined the Allman Brothers Band in 1969. Their 1971 live release, At Fillmore East, represented an artistic and commercial breakthrough. The group became one of the most popular bands of the era on the strength of their live performances and several successful albums. Though the band broke up and re-formed various times, Trucks remained a constant in their 45-year career. Trucks died of a self-inflicted gunshot wound on January 24, 2017.

== Early life ==
Trucks was born on May 11, 1947, in Jacksonville, Florida. His father was an optician. He first discovered his talent at drumming when prompted by a band director at Ribault Junior High: "The band director gave three of us sticks and said, 'Play me something,'" he recalled. He then attended Jean Ribault High School, where he was made first chair as a freshman. Trucks was in two bands before later graduating from Englewood High School in 1965: The Vikings, who released one 7-inch in 1964, and the Echoes, which mainly played Beatles covers. Trucks attended Florida State University for one year; he once said he "majored in staying out of Vietnam." His grades suffered from poor attendance and he was kicked out.

During this time, Trucks formed a band, the Bitter Ind., with two high school friends. The group played covers of Bob Dylan, the Byrds, and the Lovin' Spoonful. They relocated to Daytona Beach in hopes of finding greater success, but were often turned away by owners because their patrons were unable to dance to the music. At one club, he met members of the Allman Joys, including brothers Duane and Gregg Allman. The band changed their name to the 31st of February fearing legal action from New York nightclub The Bitter End. The band signed a deal with Vanguard Records, and their self-titled debut album was released in 1968. The group briefly toured with the Allmans under various names, recording demos later released in 1972 as Duane & Greg Allman.

== Musical career ==
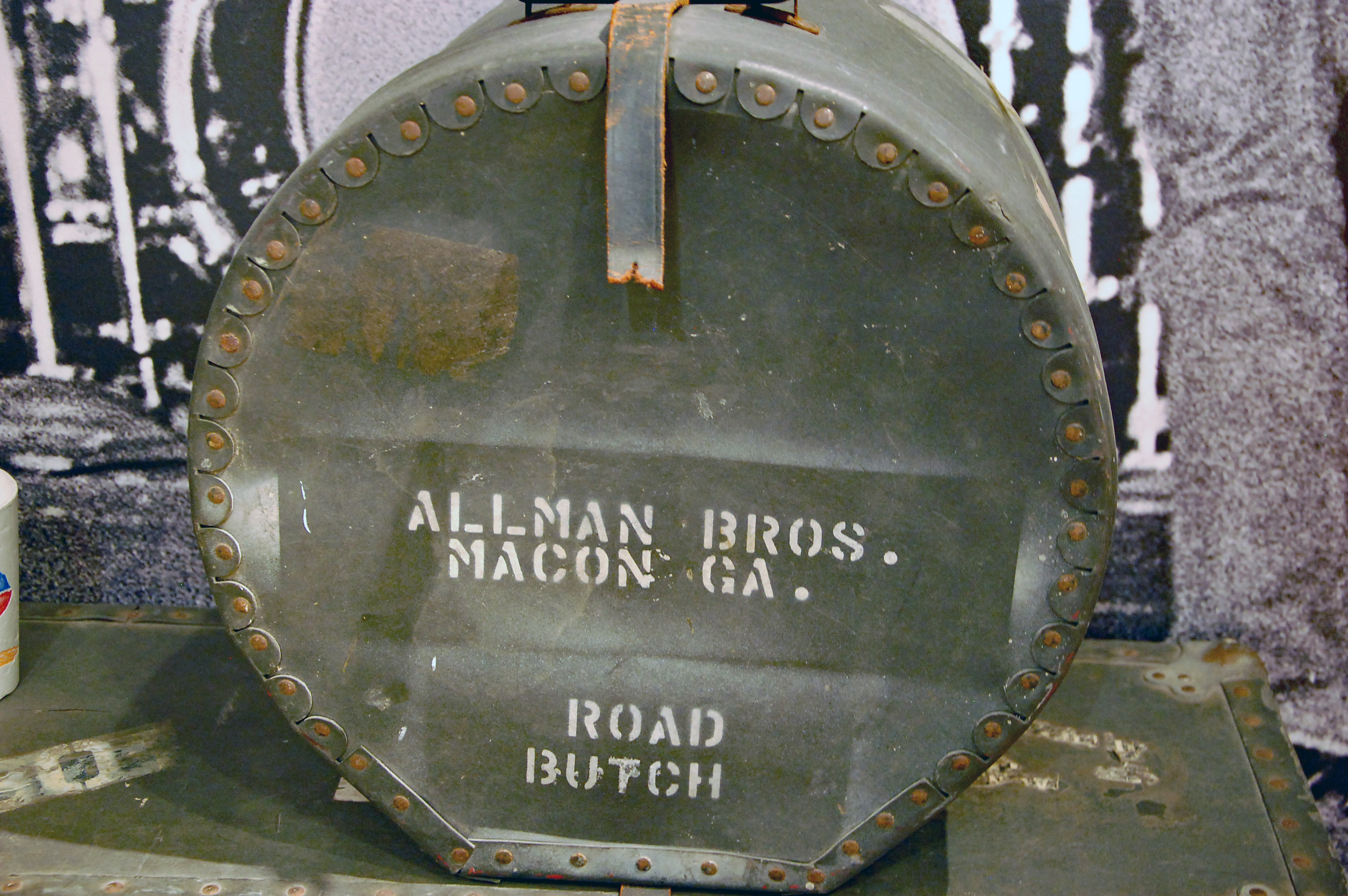
A Trucks drum case in The Allman Brothers Band Museum

Tired of his then-middling music career, Trucks pondered going back to school to study mathematics. In 1969, he was invited to join a new project headed by Duane Allman, who had secured a record deal with Atlantic Records. Allman introduced Trucks to Jai Johanny Johanson (Jaimoe), who would also be a drummer in the band. Together, the two developed a rhythmic drive that would prove crucial to the band. Trucks laid down a powerful conventional beat while the jazz-influenced Johanson added a second layer of percussion and ad libitum cymbal flourishes, seamlessly melded into one syncopated sound. Said founding member and co-lead guitarist Dickey Betts of Trucks' addition to the original band lineup, "When Butch came along, he had that freight train, meat-and-potatoes kind of thing that set Jaimoe up perfectly. He had the power thing we needed." The group became the Allman Brothers Band, who began touring heavily and released their first, self-titled album, later that November. Trucks continued to record and perform with the Allman Brothers Band until they disbanded in 2014.

From 1982 to 1984, during one of the periods in which the Allmans were broken up, Trucks was part of the group Betts, Hall, Leavell and Trucks.

Along with Allman Brothers band members Johanson, Betts and Gregg Allman, Trucks was a plaintiff in a lawsuit against UMG Recordings. The suit, initiated in 2008, sought $10 million over royalties from compact disc sales and digital download services such as Apple's iTunes. Trucks saw the license given to users for downloads as legally unsound. Trucks embraced Internet technology for the group and planned to use Moogis.com (now defunct) to make the Web a "real venue" for the Allman Brothers and other jam bands. In the Brothers' later years, he helped connect them to the extended jam band scene. In 2013, he formed the Roots Rock Revival master camp experience.

In 2015, Trucks performed at two festivals with a band billed as Butch Trucks & Very Special Friends. This band evolved into a band called Les Brers which was led by Trucks and also featured other former Allman Brothers band members including his longtime drumming partner Johanson. He also performed with a band called Butch Trucks & The Freight Train Band.

Trucks had a long interest in philosophy and literature. In 2005, The New York Times Book Review published a letter from Trucks criticizing writer Roy Blount, Jr.'s reference to Duane Allman as "one of these churls" in a review of Splendor in the Short Grass: The Grover Lewis Reader. The letter further criticized Grover Lewis for his 1971 Rolling Stone article about the band, which Trucks wrote made the members look like uneducated characters who spoke in dialogue "taken directly from Faulkner".

== Death ==
On January 24, 2017, while at his condominium in West Palm Beach, Florida, 69-year old Trucks died from a self-inflicted gunshot. He had reportedly been struggling with financial problems in the years leading up to his death.

== Personal life ==
Trucks was married for 25 years to Melinda Trucks, with whom he had two children. He also had two children from a previous marriage and four grandchildren.

Trucks was related to other famous musicians: his nephew, guitarist Derek Trucks, joined the Allman Brothers Band in 1999 and is one of the co-founders of the Tedeschi Trucks Band. Another nephew, Duane Trucks (Derek's younger brother), plays drums for Widespread Panic and Hard Working Americans. Trucks' oldest son, guitarist Vaylor Trucks, is part of a trio called The Yeti Trio based in Atlanta, Georgia.
