= Grateful Dead Download Series Volume 6 =

Live album by Grateful Dead
- Released: October 4, 2005
- Recorded: March 17, 1968
- Length: 77:43
- Label: Grateful Dead Productions

Grateful Dead chronology
Grateful Dead Download Series Volume 5 (2005)	Grateful Dead; Download Series Volume 6 (2005)	Dick's Picks Volume 36 (2005)

Download Series Volume 6 is a live album by the rock band Grateful Dead. It was released as a digital download on October 4, 2005. The album was recorded on March 17, 1968, at the Carousel Ballroom (later known as the Fillmore West) in San Francisco. The show features the first set closer, "Turn On Your Lovelight", and the entire second set.

According to the liner notes, performances from this concert utilised in the creation of the second album, Anthem of the Sun, specifically to compile the layers of sound.

Volume 6 was mastered in HDCD by Jeffrey Norman.

== Track listing ==
1. "Turn On Your Lovelight" (Joseph Scott, Deadric Malone) - 16:13
2. "That's It for the Other One" > (Jerry Garcia, Bill Kreutzmann, Bob Weir) - 9:17
3. "New Potato Caboose" (Bobby Petersen, Phil Lesh) - 8:26
4. "China Cat Sunflower" > (Robert Hunter, Garcia) - 4:42
5. "The Eleven" > (Hunter, Lesh) - 10:56
6. "Caution (Do Not Stop On Tracks)" > (Grateful Dead) - 20:54
7. "Feedback" (Grateful Dead) - 7:15

== Personnel ==
Grateful Dead

- Jerry Garcia – vocals, lead guitar
- Mickey Hart – drums, percussion
- Bill Kreutzmann – drums, percussion
- Phil Lesh – vocals, electric bass
- Ron "Pigpen" McKernan – vocals, organ, harmonica, percussion
- Bob Weir – vocals, rhythm guitar

Production

- Dan Healy – recording
- Jeffrey Norman – mastering
