= Grateful Dead Download Series Volume 5 =

Live album by Grateful Dead
- Released: September 6, 2005
- Recorded: March 27, 1988
- Length: 142:31
- Label: Grateful Dead Productions

Grateful Dead chronology
Grateful Dead Download Series Volume 4 (2005)	Grateful Dead; Download Series Volume 5 (2005)	Grateful Dead Download Series Volume 6 (2005)

Download Series Volume 5 is a live album by the rock band Grateful Dead. It features the complete concert recorded on March 27, 1988, at the Hampton Coliseum in Hampton, Virginia. The album was released as a digital download on September 6, 2005.

Except for the first two songs, which are sourced from an "Ultra-Matrix" soundboard/audience tape hybrid, the concert is derived from the soundboard master. The album was mastered in HDCD by Jeffrey Norman.

The show features one of only eight performances of Bob Dylan's "Ballad of a Thin Man" by the Grateful Dead. The show also features the band's sole performance of Miles Davis' "So What".

== Track listing ==
Disc one

First set:

1. "Iko Iko" (James "Sugar Boy" Crawford, Barbara Anne Hawkins, Rosa Lee Hawkins, Joan Marie Johnson) - 5:06
2. "Little Red Rooster" (Willie Dixon) - 8:32
3. "Stagger Lee" (Jerry Garcia, Robert Hunter) - 5:33
4. "Ballad of a Thin Man" > (Bob Dylan) - 7:04
5. "Cumberland Blues" > (Garcia, Phil Lesh, Hunter) - 5:02
6. "Me and My Uncle" > (John Phillips) - 3:10
7. "To Lay Me Down" > (Garcia, Hunter) - 8:03
8. "Let It Grow" (Bob Weir, John Perry Barlow) - 11:35

Disc two

Second set:

1. "Space" > (Garcia, Lesh, Weir) - 2:19
2. "So What" > (Miles Davis) - 0:57
3. "Sugar Magnolia" > (Weir, Hunter) - 5:13
4. "Scarlet Begonias" > (Garcia, Hunter) - 10:55
5. "Fire on the Mountain" (Mickey Hart, Hunter) - 10:40
6. "Estimated Prophet" > (Weir, Barlow) - 10:29
7. "Eyes Of The World" > (Garcia, Hunter) - 8:31
8. "Rhythm Devils" > (Hart, Bill Kreutzmann) - 7:28

Disc three

1. "Space" > (Garcia, Lesh, Weir) - 7:30
2. "Goin' Down the Road Feeling Bad" > (traditional, arranged by Grateful Dead) - 5:52
3. "I Need a Miracle" > (Weir, Barlow) - 3:20
4. "Dear Mr. Fantasy" > (Jim Capaldi, Steve Winwood, Chris Wood) - 4:53
5. "Sunshine Daydream" (Weir, Hunter) - 4:10

Encore:

6. "U.S. Blues" (Garcia, Hunter) - 5:43

== Personnel ==
Grateful Dead

- Jerry Garcia – lead guitar, vocals
- Brent Mydland – keyboards, vocals
- Mickey Hart – drums
- Bill Kreutzmann – drums
- Phil Lesh – electric bass
- Bob Weir – rhythm guitar, vocals

Production

- Dan Healy – recording
- Jeffrey Norman – mastering
