= The 31st of February =

American rock band

The 31st of February was an American rock band formed by Jacksonville, Florida natives Scott Boyer, David Brown, and Butch Trucks.

== History ==
All three founding members were alumni of Englewood High School in Jacksonville, though they did not come together musically until Brown and Trucks found themselves living on the same floor of a dormitory at Florida State University in the fall of 1965. Having heard the folk-rock of groups like The Byrds and The Lovin' Spoonful, saxophonist Brown bought an electric bass and started to jam with drummer Trucks, an alumnus of The Vikings, The Echoes, and the Jacksonville Symphonette. Guitarist and vocalist Boyer, making his living as a folk singer, was contacted by Brown who offered his and Trucks' services if Boyer would trade his acoustic guitar for an electric guitar. Boyer agreed and the three formed a group, The Bitter Ind. (short for Independents).

Playing fraternity parties, growing their hair long, and ceasing to attend their classes (in Brown's and Trucks' cases), the group left Tallahassee after the end of the school year and tried their hand at performing in Daytona Beach. After being turned down repeatedly by club owners, the group found a bit of luck, landing a one-night performance at the Club Martinique. Shortly into their set, two members of the Allman Joys, a group that frequently appeared at the club, walked in and sat down. After the group finished, the two members introduced themselves and lavished praise on the group. They were the namesakes of the Allman Joys, Duane and Gregg Allman. When the Bitter Ind. relayed their story of their inability to get steady employment, the Allmans offered them free lodging. In time, the Bitter Ind. returned to Jacksonville discouraged, their meeting with the brothers Allman the only high point of their journey.

Shortly after returning to Jacksonville, however, Trucks received a call from Duane Allman, stating that the Allman Joys were playing at the Beachcomber, a Jacksonville club, and that they needed a drummer. Trucks agreed to sit in for the night. After the show, Duane Allman suggested to Trucks to ask the club manager to let the Bitter Ind. audition. The manager agreed, loved the group's sound, and let them stay on through mid-1967. After their engagement ended, the group, no doubt under threat of legal action from the New York nightclub The Bitter End, decided to change their name. After briefly using the moniker "The Tiffany System", the group found themselves in Miami, Florida, signed to folk giant Vanguard Records as The 31st of February. Their eponymous debut album was released in early 1968, a mix of folk rock and psychedelic pop. After its failure to get noticed, the group added a lead guitarist and began to rework its sound.

Almost immediately, the group again ran into Duane and Gregg Allman, who had just broken up their post-Allman Joys group The Hour Glass. Electing to join forces, the newly hired guitarist was fired and the remaining five-piece began performing throughout the Southeast. In September 1968, they began recording material for their second album, including nascent versions of "Melissa" (which would come out on the Allman Brothers Band's Eat A Peach album in 1972) and "Nobody Knows You When You're Down And Out" (which Duane Allman would later cut with Derek and the Dominos). Though the material would not come out until four years later, it served as an important bridge towards the sound that The Allman Brothers Band would be producing within twelve months. Whilst in the midst of recording and touring, Gregg Allman elected to move out to southern California in order to let his brother and the remaining members of the Hour Glass be freed from their contract with Liberty Records. Though Gregg offered the others positions in his backing band, nothing came of it and in a matter of months, Butch Trucks would join Duane and Gregg Allman in The Allman Brothers Band.

Scott Boyer ended up forming the group Cowboy with Tommy Talton, eventually signing to the Allman Brothers Band's label, Capricorn Records. He had artery replacement surgery and was the subject of benefit gigs in 2007.

David Brown ended up a studio bassist, eventually joining Boz Scaggs's band and, later, Cowboy with Boyer. He remains a member of Norton Buffalo and the Knockouts despite Norton Buffalo's untimely death on 30 October 2009.

After joining the Allman Brothers Band, Butch Trucks has stayed there since 1969, save for the group's first (1976–1979) and second (1982–1989) hiatuses.

== Discography ==
- The 31st of February (Vanguard, 1968)
- Duane & Greg Allman (Bold, 1972)
