= The Grateful Dead (album) =

Studio album by Grateful Dead
- Released: March 17, 1967
- Recorded: January 1967
- Studios: RCA (Hollywood, California)
- Genres: Blues rock; folk rock; blues; psychedelia; San Francisco sound; garage rock
- Length: 34:53
- Label: Warner Bros.
- Producer: David Hassinger

Grateful Dead chronology
The Grateful Dead (1967)	Anthem of the Sun (1968)

Singles from The Grateful Dead
- 1. "The Golden Road (To Unlimited Devotion)" Released: March 15, 1967

The Grateful Dead is the debut studio album by the American rock band the Grateful Dead, released by Warner Bros. Records on March 17, 1967. According to the biographies of both bassist Phil Lesh and drummer Bill Kreutzmann, the band released the album as San Francisco's Grateful Dead.

== History ==
The album was primarily recorded at RCA's Studio A, in Los Angeles, in only four days. The band had wanted to record the tracks in their hometown of San Francisco, but no recording studios in the area had modernized equipment at the time. The group picked David Hassinger to produce because he had worked as an engineer on the Rolling Stones' "(I Can't Get No) Satisfaction" and Jefferson Airplane's Surrealistic Pillow album (on the latter of which Jerry Garcia had guested and suggested the album title). Due to demands by the band's label, Warner Brothers, four of the tracks were edited for length. Phil Lesh comments in his autobiography, "to my ear, the only track that sounds at all like we did at the time is Viola Lee Blues. ...None of us had any experience with performing for recording...the whole process felt a bit rushed." Bill Kreutzmann, in his autobiography, says of the songs, "their recorded versions failed to capture the energy that we had when we performed them live. ...We weren’t that good yet. We were still learning how to be a band."

Though the album was considered "a big deal in San Francisco", it did not see much airplay on AM radio stations outside of the Bay Area. The freeform FM radio format that favored bands like the Dead was still developing. Warner Bros. held an album release party on March 20, 1967, at the Fugazi Hall in North Beach. The label's A & R manager, Joe Smith, is noted for saying he "[is] proud that Warner Bros. is introducing the Grateful Dead to the world."

The band used the collective pseudonym "McGannahan Skjellyfetti" for their group-written originals and arrangements. The name was a misrendering of "Skujellifeddy", a character in Kenneth Patchen's comic novel The Memoirs of a Shy Pornographer, plus the name of frontman Pigpen's cat. In an era where true authorship (or public domain status) was more difficult to ascertain, "Cold Rain and Snow" and "New, New Minglewood Blues" were originally credited as band compositions, though they were adaptations of existing songs.

A remastered version with the full versions of five album tracks, plus six bonus tracks, was released by Rhino as part of the box set The Golden Road (1965–1973) in 2001, and as a separate album in 2003. Album outtake "Alice D. Millionaire" was inspired by an autumn 1966 newspaper headline "LSD Millionaire", about the Dead's sound engineer and benefactor Owsley Stanley.

The album was reissued for Record Store Day 2011 on 180g vinyl cut from the original analog masters from 1967 – the first time in over 40 years it had been released in this form. The 2013 high-definition digital, remastered release features the edited versions, as originally released, of the four tracks which were extended for the 2003 Rhino release.

This edition was given a new version for the album's 50th anniversary in 2017, including a second CD featuring live material from a pair of July 1966 concerts in the Garden Auditorium, Vancouver, Canada. The second CD was released on vinyl as a stand-alone double LP on Record Store Day 2017.

== Album cover ==
On the originally prepared artwork, the writing for the top of the album cover read "In the land of the dark, the ship of the sun is drawn by the Grateful Dead", a passage taken from the Egyptian Book of the Dead. As the book had become more widely read, some had mistakenly assumed that the band had taken their name from the quote: "We now return our souls to the creator, as we stand on the edge of eternal darkness. Let our chant fill the void in order that others may know. In the land of the night, the ship of the sun is drawn by the grateful dead." Because Garcia worried that it seemed "pretentious", and the band were uneasy about being seen as beholden to any specific philosophy or doctrine, they asked the artist, Stanley Mouse, to stylize the script so that all but the band name were illegible. The central image depicts a 12th-century Chola sculpture of Yoga-Narasimha, an avatar of Vishnu. The sculpture is currently housed at the Nelson-Atkins Museum of Art.

== Critical reception ==
Professional ratings
Review scores
Source	Rating
AllMusic	4/5 stars
Pitchfork	6.9/10

Reviewing in 1967 for The Village Voice, Richard Goldstein called the album "straight, decent rhythm and blues" and "a perfect illustration" of "a GOOD ALBUM, like those long lasting cold remedies ... filled with tiny time capsules which burst open at their own speed. Cuts that astound at first fade as subtle ballads emerge. Great blasts of noise vanish as haunting melodies appear. A line suddenly hits home... a phrase... a shade of meaning, and the whole album becomes something else again."

In 2007, The Grateful Dead was included on Rolling Stone's list of the 40 essential albums from 1967. In a piece accompanying the list, Robert Christgau wrote of the album:

One of the year's few supposedly psychedelic LPs that wasn't actually a pop LP (cf. Sgt. Pepper, Forever Changes, Mellow Yellow), the already legendary San Francisco band-collective's debut stood out and stands tall because its boogieing folk rock epitomizes the San Francisco ballroom ethos—blues-based tunes played by musicians who came to rhythm late, expanded so they were equally suitable for dancing and for tripping out. It's also the only studio album that respects the impact of Ron 'Pigpen' McKernan, who died in 1973 of cirrhosis of the liver. McKernan's organ is almost as pervasive as Jerry Garcia's guitar. And although Garcia and Bob Weir both take vocal leads, their singing styles are still in Pigpen's white-blues thrall.

== Track listing ==
Side one
No.	Title	Writer(s)	Lead vocals	Length
1.	"The Golden Road (To Unlimited Devotion)"	McGannahan Skjellyfetti	Jerry Garcia	2:07
2.	"Beat It on Down the Line"	Jesse Fuller	Bob Weir	2:27
3.	"Good Morning, Little School Girl"	Sonny Boy Williamson	Ron "Pigpen" McKernan	5:56
4.	"Cold Rain and Snow"	Obray Ramsey	Garcia	2:25
5.	"Sitting on Top of the World"	Lonnie Chatmon; Walter Vinson	Garcia	2:01
6.	"Cream Puff War"	Garcia	Garcia	2:25

Side two
No.	Title	Writer(s)	Lead vocals	Length
1.	"Morning Dew"	Bonnie Dobson; Tim Rose	Garcia	5:00
2.	"New, New Minglewood Blues"	Noah Lewis	Weir	2:31
3.	"Viola Lee Blues"	Lewis	Garcia; Weir	10:01

- Sides one and two were combined as tracks 1–9 on CD reissues.
- "McGannahan Skjellyfetti" was a pseudonym used for full-band collaborations.

2001/2003 reissue
No.	Title	Length
1.	"The Golden Road (To Unlimited Devotion)"	2:09
2.	"Beat It on Down the Line"	2:29
3.	"Good Morning Little School Girl" (full-length version)	6:32
4.	"Cold Rain and Snow"	2:26
5.	"Sitting on Top of the World" (full-length version)	2:43
6.	"Cream Puff War" (full-length version)	3:18
7.	"Morning Dew"	5:16
8.	"New, New Minglewood Blues" (full-length version)	2:40
9.	"Viola Lee Blues"	10:09

- track 1 recorded at Coast Recorders, San Francisco, CA (January 1967)
- tracks 2 to 9 recorded at RCA Studio A, Los Angeles, CA (January 1967)
- reissued CD contains full-length versions of tracks 3, 5, 6, & 8

2001/2003 reissue bonus tracks
No.	Title	Writer(s)	Lead vocals	Length
10.	"Alice D. Millionaire"	Garcia; Bill Kreutzmann; Phil Lesh; McKernan; Weir	McKernan	2:22
11.	"Overseas Stomp (the Lindy)"	Jab Jones and Will Shade	Garcia	2:24
12.	"Tastebud"	McKernan	McKernan	4:18
13.	"Death Don't Have No Mercy" (instrumental version)	Reverend Gary Davis	n/a	5:20
14.	"Viola Lee Blues" (edited version)			3:00
15.	"Viola Lee Blues" (live)			23:13

- tracks 10 to 13 recorded at RCA Victor Studio A, Hollywood, CA (February 2, 1967)
- track 14 is an edit of track 9
- track 15 recorded live at Dance Hall, Rio Nido, CA (September 3, 1967). Master reels are missing the beginning; track begins at the end of the second verse. Another track from this date (a cover of "In the Midnight Hour") is on Fallout from the Phil Zone.

=== 50th Anniversary Deluxe Edition ===
==== Disc two ====
July 29, 1966 – Garden Auditorium – Vancouver, British Columbia
No.	Title	Writer(s)	Lead vocals	Length
1.	"Standing on the Corner"	Garcia; Kreutzmann; Lesh; McKernan; Weir	Garcia	3:23
2.	"I Know You Rider"	Trad. arr. Grateful Dead	Garcia; Weir	3:14
3.	"Next Time You See Me"	Earl Forest, Bill Harvey	McKernan	3:37
4.	"Sitting on Top of the World"			3:47
5.	"You Don’t Have to Ask"	Garcia; Kreutzmann; Lesh; McKernan; Weir	Weir	5:14
6.	"Big Boss Man"	Luther Dixon, Al Smith	McKernan	4:16
7.	"Stealin’"	Gus Cannon	Garcia	3:37
8.	"Cardboard Cowboy"	Lesh	Lesh; Weir	2:56
9.	"It's All Over Now, Baby Blue"	Bob Dylan	Garcia	5:23
10.	"Cream Puff War"			7:52
11.	"Viola Lee Blues"			10:03
12.	"Beat It on Down the Line"			2:47
13.	"Good Morning Little Schoolgirl" (excerpt of performance; original tape ran out)			5:47

July 30, 1966 – Garden Auditorium – Vancouver, British Columbia
No.	Title	Writer(s)	Lead vocals	Length
14.	"Cold, Rain and Snow"	Jerry Garcia, Robert Hunter	Weir	3:14
15.	"One Kind Favor"	Blind Lemon Jefferson	Garcia	4:23
16.	"Hey Little One"	Dorsey Burnette, Barry De Vorzon	Garcia	5:39
17.	"New, New Minglewood Blues"	Traditional, et al.	Phil Lesh	3:23

== Personnel ==
Grateful Dead

- Jerry "Captain Trips" Garcia – lead guitar, vocals, arrangement
- Bob Weir – rhythm guitar, vocals
- Ron "Pigpen" McKernan – Vox Continental organ, harmonica, vocals
- Phil Lesh – bass guitar, vocals
- Bill The Drummer (Bill Kreutzmann) – drums, percussion

Technical personnel

- Dick Bogert – engineering
- Betty Cantor – engineering
- Bob Cassidy – engineering
- David Hassinger – production

Reissue production credits

- James Austin – reissue production
- Joe Gastwirt – mastering, production consultant
- Cassidy Law – project coordination, Grateful Dead Archives
- Eileen Law – archival research, Grateful Dead Archives
- David Lemieux – reissue production
- Peter McQuaid – executive production, Grateful Dead Productions
- Jeffrey Norman – additional mixing on bonus tracks
- Michael Wesley Johnson – associate production, research coordination

50th Anniversary Edition production credits

- Produced for release by David Lemieux
- Executive Producer: Mark Pinkus
- Associate Producer: Doran Tyson, Ivette Ramos
- Package Design: Steve Vance
- Tape Research: Michael Wesley Johnson

== Charts ==
Chart (1967)	Peak position
US Billboard Top LP's	73
US Cash Box Top 100 Albums	77
US Record World 100 Top LP's	61

== See also ==
- Grateful Dead discography
