= Cream Puff War =

Song by the Grateful Dead

from the album The Grateful Dead
- A-side: "The Golden Road (To Unlimited Devotion)"
- Released: March 17, 1967
- Genre: Garage rock
- Length: 2:25
- Label: Warner Bros.
- Songwriter: Jerry Garcia
- Producer: David Hassinger

"Cream Puff War" is a song by the American rock band the Grateful Dead, released as the sixth track on the band's debut album The Grateful Dead (1967). It is one of only three songs the band released to have been written solely by Jerry Garcia with no contributions from Robert Hunter.

"Cream Puff War" was released as a single in support of the album. It was the B-side, backing "The Golden Road (To Unlimited Devotion)".

== Overview ==
Being the second of only two original Dead compositions on the band's debut album, "Cream Puff War" is a subtle, yet public commentary on America's greed, written by Garcia, and tells the story of a man who likes playing mind games who gets what he deserves. Garcia said in a 1967 interview that "This is mine from beginning to end.... We were down in LA, I was writing, I had the changes worked out and the bridge and the first verse. The whole thing was just meandering along. Pigpen said let's call it 'Cream Puff War'." The band reportedly performed "Cream Puff War" about 10 times between 1966 and 1967.

== Release and reception ==
In a ranking of the band's 100 greatest songs, Rolling Stone placed it at number 85, with writer Jon Dolan calling it "explosive garage rock that’s faster and more raw-sounding than pretty much anything else the Dead recorded," noting that "the song could have easily fit in next to the Electric Prunes and the Seeds on the classic garage band compilation Nuggets." AllMusic writer Matthew Greenwald wrote: "Led by a great blues-rock guitar riff from Jerry Garcia, this song starts and ends as a high-octane exercise in psychedelic rock & roll. However, a brief, almost waltz-time bridge also showcases the band's unique artistry, yet in the three minutes it takes to listen to the song, it goes by in a blur, possibly due to the amount of drugs taken at the session." A live version of the track, recorded at the Vancouver Trips Festival on July 29, 1966, was included on the deluxe edition of The Grateful Dead. When talking about the band's "Essential" live tracks, Pitchfork wrote ""Attacked with an urgency they’d never again employ, ["Cream Puff War"] is on the garage-ier end of the psych spectrum, with a delinquent Farfisa and uncharacteristically fierce Garcia vocals. Of course, it’s still the Dead, so it’s a little too fussy for true garage-fuzz, with a pile of chords and sudden swerves into waltz time." It was included as the second track on the Grateful Dead's 2015 compilation album The Best of the Grateful Dead.

== Cover versions ==
The Canadian hardcore punk band Fucked Up contributed a cover of the song for the 2016 tribute album Day of the Dead.
