= Dupree's Diamond Blues =

- Cover art for 2017 reissue

Single by Grateful Dead

from the album Aoxomoxoa
- B-side: "Cosmic Charlie"
- Released: July 1969
- Length: 3:32
- Label: Warner Bros.-Seven Arts
- Composer: Jerry Garcia
- Lyricist: Robert Hunter
- Producer: Grateful Dead

Grateful Dead singles chronology
"Dark Star" (1967)	"Dupree's Diamond Blues" (1969)	"Uncle John's Band" (1970)

"Dupree's Diamond Blues" is a song by the American rock band Grateful Dead, released as the only single from the band's third studio album Aoxomoxoa (1969), backed by "Cosmic Charlie".

== Overview ==
"Dupree's Diamond Blues" shares a similar melody to the band's 1970 song "Casey Jones" from their album Workingman's Dead, with many people, including Matthew Greenwald of AllMusic calling it a "working" version" of "Casey Jones". Composer Jerry Garcia said of the song that "It reminds me of a little cartoon strip, with cartoon characters. It has a banjo in it, a little 12-string and stuff like that. Texturally it's really successful to my ears. It does what it's supposed to do." Dead historian Oliver Trager believed Garcia and Robert Hunter had "made a little cottage industry out of reinterpreting some of the most venerable songs in the American folk canon and “Dupree’s Diamond Blues” is the earliest example of their talents in this area." The track was issued as a single backed with "Cosmic Charlie" in July 1969.

== Critical reception ==
In a retrospective review of Aoxomoxoa, Ian Maxton of Spectrum Culture believed the band show a "playful, blues-y side" on the track, likening it to "In the Summertime" by Mungo Jerry. Matthew Greenwald said in an AllMusic review of the song that its music has "A slow-chugging, near-boogie feel is akin to a slow-moving train, and the overdubbed keyboards and guitars create a loose, rootsy sense of jug band psychedelia." While Fred Thomas commented in the album's editorial review for AllMusic that "The early glimpses of the Hunter/Garcia partnership[ ]come through on the bluegrass-inflected "Dupree's Diamond Blues""

== Personnel ==
According to the Grateful Dead Family Discography:

Grateful Dead

- Tom Constanten - keyboards
- Jerry Garcia - guitar, vocals
- Mickey Hart - percussion
- Bill Kreutzmann - percussion
- Phil Lesh - basses, vocals
- Ron "Pigpen" McKernan - keyboards
- Bob Weir - guitars, vocals

Additional unspecified personnel

- John Dawson (Marma-duke)
- David Nelson
- Peter Grant
- Wendy (surname unknown)
- Debbie (surname unknown)
- Mouse
