= The Golden Road (To Unlimited Devotion) =

- 2017 re-release

Single by the Grateful Dead

from the album The Grateful Dead
- B-side: "Cream Puff War"
- Released: March 15, 1967
- Length: 2:07
- Label: Warner Bros.
- Songwriter: McGannahan Skjellyfetti
- Producer: David Hassinger

The Grateful Dead singles chronology
"Don't Ease Me In" (1966)	"The Golden Road (To Unlimited Devotion)" (1967)	"Dark Star" (1968)

"The Golden Road (To Unlimited Devotion)" is a song written by all the members of the Grateful Dead under the pseudonym McGannahan Skjellyfetti, and included as the opening track on the band's eponymous debut album (1967). It is the only song released under the McGannahan Skjellyfetti pseudonym, a pseudonym that references "Skjellyfuddy", a character in the comic novel The Memoirs of a Shy Pornographer and the name of keyboardist Ron "Pigpen" McKernan's pet cat. The song was released as the only single from the album, and the second single released by the band.

== Background and composition ==
The song is a garage-band pop track about a barefoot hippie chick. It is one of only two original compositions on the album, the other being "Cream Puff War", credited solely to Jerry Garcia and the single's B-side.

== Release and reception ==
Being the album's only single, "The Golden Road (To Unlimited Devotion)" was generally well received, with Cashbox stating that the band "may well be on the “Golden Road” to the top of the charts with this up-tempo, pulsating, thumping, rocking, driving, freaky venture." Record World notes they "stir it up the way teens like to hear it". Matthew Greenwald states that: "The first track on the long-awaited debut Grateful Dead album not only announced the band's abilities but gave a slightly whacked-out, but nevertheless accurate portrait of the Haight-Asbury social scene." noting that "A funky, bluegrass lead guitar lead by Jerry Garcia, along with the vocal harmony camaraderie is right in the listeners' face, filled with joy and a great degree of overall vibe." The track is included on various compilation albums such as The Very Best of Grateful Dead and The Best of the Grateful Dead. Despite being an early track, which would suggest the song had been performed a lot of times, the track has only been performed a total of four times. Richard Goldstein wrote in a Village Voice review of the band's self titled album that it "turns out to be plain old rock with vocal harmonies that remind you of the Mamas and the Papas, of all things.

== Personnel ==
According to the Grateful Dead Family Discography:

Performers

- Jerry Garcia – guitar, vocals
- Bill Kreutzmann – drums
- Phil Lesh – bass
- Ron "Pigpen" McKernan – keyboards, harmonica, vocals
- Bob Weir – guitar

Production

- Producer – Dave Hassinger
- Arranger – The Grateful Dead
- Engineer – Dick Bogert
