= Aoxomoxoa =

Studio album by Grateful Dead
- Released: June 20, 1969
- Recorded: September 1968 – March 1969
- Studios: Pacific Recording, San Mateo; Pacific High Recording, San Francisco
- Genres: Psychedelic rock; acid rock; psychedelic folk
- Length: 36:00
- Label: Warner Bros.-Seven Arts
- Producer: Grateful Dead

Grateful Dead chronology
| Anthem of the Sun (1968) | Aoxomoxoa (1969) | Live/Dead (1969) |

Singles from Aoxomoxoa
- 1. "Dupree's Diamond Blues" Released: July 1969

Aoxomoxoa is the third studio album by American rock band the Grateful Dead, released on June 20, 1969, by Warner Bros.-Seven Arts. It was one of the first rock albums to be recorded using 16-track technology. The title is a meaningless palindrome, usually pronounced /ˌɒksəməkˈsoʊə/ OK-sə-mək-SOH-ə.

Rolling Stone, upon reviewing the album, mentioned that "no other music sustains a lifestyle so delicate and loving and lifelike". The album was certified gold by the RIAA on May 13, 1997. In 1991 Rolling Stone selected Aoxomoxoa as having the eighth best album cover of all time. It was voted number 674 in the third edition of Colin Larkin's All Time Top 1000 Albums (2000).

== Background and development ==
The album was a series of firsts for the band. It is the first album the band recorded entirely in or near their original hometown of San Francisco (at Pacific Recording Studio in nearby San Mateo, and at the similarly named Pacific High Recording Studio in San Francisco proper). It is the only studio release to include pianist Tom Constanten as an official member (he had contributed to the previous album and played live with the band from November 1968 to January 1970). It was also the first to have lyricist Robert Hunter as a full-time contributor to the band, thus cementing the Jerry Garcia/Robert Hunter songwriting partnership that endured for the rest of the band's existence. It was also the first time the band would showcase acoustic arrangements (as on "Mountains of the Moon", "Rosemary", and "Dupree's Diamond Blues"), which would become the focus of the next two studio albums.

Some of the songs on Aoxomoxoa were played live briefly and then dropped. Only "China Cat Sunflower" became a set staple through the band's career, with "Dupree's Diamond Blues" somewhat less so. "St. Stephen" was played until 1971, revived in 1976 and 1977 and played a handful of times after that. Likewise, "Cosmic Charlie" was played a few times again in 1976.

== Recording ==
The album was recorded twice. The initial version, with the working title Earthquake Country, was abandoned when Ampex manufactured and released the first 16-track multitrack recording machine (model number MM-1000). Offering 16 discrete tracks for recording and playback, it doubled the number of tracks that had been available when they recorded Anthem of the Sun, the previous year. Consequently, the band spent eight months in the studio, off-and-on, not only recording the album but getting used to — and experimenting with — the new technology. Garcia commented, "it was our first adventure with sixteen-track and we tended to put too much on everything...A lot of the music was just lost in the mix, a lot of what was really there". Drummer Bill Kreutzmann states, "sixteen-track technology came along only after we did our initial recording using an eight-track at the end of 1968. But when the studio procured one of the first sixteen-track recorders in the world (the same one we used for Live/Dead), the decision was made to toss everything we had already done and record it all again. From scratch. This time we could go deeper and experiment with things no other band had done yet. Being able to utilize twice as many tracks essentially doubled the possibilities of what we could do with each song. The end result was dense and cumbersome in places, and all that studio time cost us a fortune, but we were experimenting on the sonic frontier, exploiting cutting-edge technology."

Indeed, the lengthy sessions for the album would put the band deeper into debt with Warner Bros. Records — specifically, a total cost of $180,000 (US$1,580,309 in 2025 dollars) for Aoxomoxoa. It was their most ambitious and costly venture to date and the last time the band would ever run up such high studio bills. Kreutzmann later commented, "Sometime in 1969, when we realized the colossal debt we got ourselves into with the decidedly indulgent making of Aoxomoxoa, we realized that we needed to get a handle on our finances. We were a group of altruistic troubadours, a traveling psychedelic circus."

Along with help from guest musicians such as John "Marmaduke" Dawson and David Nelson, Lesh played acoustic bass for the first time. He later commented, "the fun part of that was trying to play in tune with no frets to guide my fingers, just like a violin." Unlike the band's other studio albums, Garcia sang lead on every track.

== Title and cover art ==
The title of the album is a palindrome created by cover artist Rick Griffin and lyricist Robert Hunter. According to Living with the Dead, the audio memoir of band manager Rock Scully, the title is pronounced "ox-oh-mox-oh-ah".

One fan legend considers the words "Grateful Dead" on the front of the album, written in large, flowing capital letters, to be an ambigram that can also be read "we ate the acid". Kreutzmann states, "Aoxomoxoa...doesn’t mean anything — it’s just a cool palindrome. People have surmised over the years that you could read the Grateful Dead lettering on the front cover as We Ate the Acid which, I suppose, is true enough, if you look at it just right."

The artwork is adapted from a painting that was originally created as a concert poster for the band. The bottom portion depicts death, rebirth and the cycle of life, with fertility symbols and Egyptian-based imagery. The top depicts a sun which doubles as an egg being fertilized. Both sides feature stylized censers.

Courtney Love has claimed to be featured among those photographed on the album's back cover. Love's father, Hank Harrison, had close ties to the band at the time, and had briefly worked for them in some capacity. Love's claim was corroborated by David Gans in 2011, but further research has proved her incorrect; the girl often identified as Love was actually Bill Kreutzmann's daughter Stacy, who was the same age as Love at the time the photo was taken. Kreutzmann has stated, "...despite rumors, that’s not a five-year-old Courtney Love on the back cover in the group photo. That’s my daughter, Stacy." The man sitting on a horse in the back cover photograph is jazz pianist Vince Guaraldi, a friend of the band.

== Critical reception ==
Professional ratings
Review scores
| Source | Rating |
|---|---|
| AllMusic | 3.5/5 stars |
| The Encyclopedia of Popular Music | 4/5 stars |
| The Village Voice | A |

Reviewing Aoxomoxoa in 1969, Rolling Stone's Adele Novelli called it "the work of the magical band. Can you hear this music and not see them before your eyes? The music is so much the reality of their physical and spiritual bodies that seeing them is the wonder of seeing music." In The Village Voice, Robert Christgau found the album "fantastic", with the exception of the "one experimental" song.

Years later, AllMusic's Fred Thomas said "the Grateful Dead reached their true peak of psychedelia" with the album, embellishing "the exploratory jamming and rough-edged blues-rock of their live shows" with "overdubbed choirs, electronic sound effects, and layers of processed vocal harmonies." According to Adam Bouyamourn of The National, the album's "iconoclastic acid rock … combined free jazz, improvisation and psychedelia".

== Remix ==
Second-guessing the end results, Garcia and Lesh went back in the studio in 1971 to remix the album, removing many parts present on the original release, including a choir singing on "Mountains of the Moon", many difficult-to-identify sounds on "What's Become of the Baby", and an a cappella ending for "Doin' that Rag," dropped for an earlier fadeout. The remix also uses different vocal takes on some songs, most noticeably "Dupree's Diamond Blues." The result, with the same catalog number (WS1790) and perhaps brighter sound, but with much of the original's experimental character removed, can be identified by the "Remixed September, 1971" legend on the back cover. Mistakenly, the song timings on the first (1987) CD release refer to the original mix, not the remix (varying most significantly on "Doin' that Rag," which was edited from 5:15 to 4:41, and "China Cat Sunflower," edited from 4:15 to 3:40).

The original mix was later planned for CD release, but the original master tapes could not be located. When the masters were finally found, years later, they were used for The Warner Bros. Studio Albums vinyl box set, marking the first time the 1969 mix has been available since the 1971 remix replaced it, in 1972. The 2013 high definition remastering for download uses the remixed version – even though promotion related to this release declared "produced from the original analog master tapes in 2013, using the original album mixes".

An edit of the track "Doin' that Rag" was released on the Warner/Reprise Loss Leaders compilation The 1969 Warner/Reprise Record Show. Since this set stayed in print through the late 1970s, it provided a sample of the original mix for some years after the full album was only available in the remixed version.

The 2003 reissue (originally part of the 2001 box set The Golden Road) includes three studio jams (including an early version of "The Eleven") from the original aborted eight-track sessions for the album, and a live version of "Cosmic Charlie" recorded early in 1969.

On June 7, 2019 Rhino Records released the "50th Anniversary Deluxe Edition" of Aoxomoxoa. Disc one contains both mixes of the album – the one from 1969 and the one from 1971. Disc two contains previously unreleased live tracks from the Avalon Ballroom in San Francisco, recorded on January 24–26, 1969.

== Track listing ==
All tracks are written by Jerry Garcia and Robert Hunter, except "St. Stephen", written by Garcia, Phil Lesh, and Hunter.

Side one
| No. | Title | Length |
|---|---|---|
| 1. | "St. Stephen" | 4:26 |
| 2. | "Dupree's Diamond Blues" | 3:32 |
| 3. | "Rosemary" | 1:58 |
| 4. | "Doin' That Rag" | 4:41 |
| 5. | "Mountains of the Moon" | 4:02 |

Side two
| No. | Title | Length |
|---|---|---|
| 1. | "China Cat Sunflower" | 3:40 |
| 2. | "What's Become of the Baby" | 8:12 |
| 3. | "Cosmic Charlie" | 5:29 |
| Total length: | | 36:00 |

2001/2003 reissue bonus tracks
| No. | Title | Writer(s) | Length |
|---|---|---|---|
| 9. | "Clementine Jam" | Garcia, Mickey Hart, Bill Kreutzmann, Lesh, Ron McKernan, Bob Weir | 10:46 |
| 10. | "Nobody's Spoonful Jam" | Garcia, Hart, Kreutzmann, Lesh, McKernan, Weir | 10:04 |
| 11. | "The Eleven Jam" | Garcia, Hart, Kreutzmann, Lesh, McKernan, Weir | 15:00 |
| 12. | "Cosmic Charlie" (live) | | 6:47 |

=== 50th Anniversary Deluxe Edition ===
Disc 2: Live at Avalon Ballroom, San Francisco, CA (1/24/69-1/26/69)
| No. | Title | Writer(s) | Length |
|---|---|---|---|
| 1. | "New Potato Caboose" | Lesh, Robert Petersen | 13:59 |
| 2. | "Dupree's Diamond Blues" | | 4:41 |
| 3. | "Doin' That Rag" | | 5:42 |
| 4. | "Alligator >" | Lesh, McKernan, Weir | 9:09 |
| 5. | "Caution (Do Not Stop on Tracks) >" | Garcia, Hart, Kreutzmann, Lesh, McKernan, Weir | 7:11 |
| 6. | "Feedback >" | Garcia, Hart, Kreutzmann, Lesh, McKernan, Weir | 3:46 |
| 7. | "And We Bid You Goodnight" | Traditional, arranged by Grateful Dead | 2:39 |
| 8. | "Clementine >" | Lesh, Hunter | 11:05 |
| 9. | "Death Don't Have No Mercy" | Reverend Gary Davis | 9:57 |

Notes

- Tracks 9–11 recorded live in the studio at Pacific Recording Studio, San Mateo, California, on August 13, 1968
- Track 12 recorded at the Avalon Ballroom on January 25, 1969
- Track 1 on disc two of the Deluxe Edition, recorded on January 24, 1969
- Tracks 2–7 on disc two of the Deluxe Edition, recorded on January 25, 1969
- Tracks 8–9 on disc two of the Deluxe Edition, recorded on January 26, 1969

== Personnel ==
Grateful Dead

- Jerry Garcia – guitar, vocals
- Bob Weir – guitar, vocals
- Ron "Pigpen" McKernan – organ, percussion
- Tom Constanten – keyboards
- Phil Lesh – bass, vocals
- Bill Kreutzmann – drums, percussion
- Mickey Hart – drums, percussion

Additional musicians

- John "Marmaduke" Dawson
- David Nelson
- Peter Grant
- Wendy
- Debbie
- Mouse
- Doug McKechnie – vocal modulation (on "What's Become of the Baby"; uncredited)

Technical personnel

- Betty Cantor – engineer
- Dan Healy – consulting engineer
- Bob Matthews – executive engineer
- Owsley Stanley – consulting engineer (credited as "Owsley")
- Ron Wickersham – consulting engineer

Reissue personnel

- James Austin – production
- Joe Gastwirt – mastering, production consultation
- Michael Wesley Johnson – associate production, research coordination
- Cassidy Law – project coordination, Grateful Dead Archives
- Eileen Law – archival research, Grateful Dead Archives
- David Lemieux – production
- Peter McQuaid – executive production, Grateful Dead Productions
- Jeffrey Norman – additional mixing on bonus tracks

== Charts ==
| Chart (1969) | Peak position |
|---|---|
| US Billboard Top LP's | 73 |
| US Record World 100 Top LP's | 89 |
