= Dark Star (song) =

Single by the Grateful Dead

Single by Grateful Dead
- B-side: "Born Cross-Eyed"
- Released: April 1968
- Recorded: 1968
- Genre: Psychedelic rock; acid rock; experimental rock; avant-garde; space rock; jazz-rock
- Length: 2:44
- Label: Warner Bros.
- Songwriters: Grateful Dead; Robert Hunter
- Producers: Grateful Dead; David Hassinger

Grateful Dead singles chronology
"The Golden Road (To Unlimited Devotion)" (1967)	"Dark Star" (1968)	"Dupree's Diamond Blues" (1969)

"Dark Star" is a song by American rock band the Grateful Dead, released as a single by Warner Bros. Records in April 1968. It was written by lyricist Robert Hunter and composed by lead guitarist Jerry Garcia; however, compositional credit is sometimes extended to include Phil Lesh, Bill Kreutzmann, Mickey Hart, Ron "Pigpen" McKernan, and Bob Weir.

"Dark Star" was an early Grateful Dead classic, which the group often used as a vehicle for extended jam sessions during live performances. One such performance, lasting 23 minutes, was included on the Dead's breakthrough 1969 album Live/Dead and is the best-known version of the song. "Dark Star" is included in The Rock and Roll Hall of Fame's 500 Songs that Shaped Rock and Roll list and was ranked at number 57 on Rolling Stone's 100 Greatest Guitar Songs of All Time.

== Composition and release ==
In May 1967, Garcia composed the preliminary chords of the song, but without lyrics. A few months later, Garcia's friend Robert Hunter heard an early instrumental version of the song and quickly wrote lyrics -- one of the earliest of his many collaborations with the band. Hunter took inspiration from the opening lines of "The Love Song of J. Alfred Prufrock" as the chorus.

"Dark Star" was initially released as a single in 1968, backed with "Born Cross-Eyed", a track written by rhythm guitarist Bob Weir. The single, to quote Phil Lesh, "sank like a stone." Of the 1600 copies that made up the original shipment in 1968 by Warner Bros., only about 500 actually sold. It also features Hunter's only appearance on a Grateful Dead record as a performer, reciting a monologue at the end of the song.

A live version appeared in 1969 on Live/Dead, the Dead's first live album.

The single version was included on later compilations What a Long Strange Trip It's Been in 1977 and The Best of the Grateful Dead in 2015. The single also appears as a bonus track on the 2001 reissue of Live/Dead.

In August 2026, Rolling Stone ranked this song as the 10th best Grateful Dead song of all time.

== Performance history ==
Due to the relentless touring of the Grateful Dead, and the fact that fans were allowed to tape the band's shows, many live versions of "Dark Star" exist. The studio recording of "Dark Star" lasted only 2:40, yet the song was known for its lengthy live performances, many of which clocked in at 20–30 minutes. Running over 23 minutes, the popular rendition as found on the Live/Dead live album was a blend of psychedelia, jazz, and jam elements. "Dark Star" defines the Dead's early improvisational music. At Woodstock 1969 it clocked in at 19:08.

After 1973, "Dark Star" fell out of the normal rotation at Dead shows; the song was not performed at all between October 18, 1974 and December 31, 1978. Being present for a "Dark Star" performance became a "Holy Grail" for Deadheads. The song eventually became one of legend in which it was often referred to as "IT" by dedicated Heads. With this knowledge, the Dead would sometimes tease the song's introduction before switching into another song, finally bringing it back in the end of the seventies on New Year's 1978, at the closing of Winterland. Semi-regular guest pianist Bruce Hornsby would later incorporate such teases into his own concerts.

After the New Years 1981 show, "Dark Star" only appeared once more in the first half of the eighties (at the Hearst Greek Theatre on July 13, 1984) and lay dormant until revived at the "Formerly the Warlocks" two-day run at Hampton Coliseum in Hampton, Virginia on October 9, 1989. Shortly after, performing as the Grateful Dead, "Dark Star" returned on October 16, 1989 in a performance at the Meadowlands Arena (FKA Brendan Byrne Arena) which later was released as Nightfall of Diamonds, and concluded this tour with another performance at Miami on October 26, 1989. After its 1989 revival, the song was performed eight times in 1990, and occasionally through the rest of the band's career. Notable post-revival "Dark Stars" include performances with jazz saxophonist Branford Marsalis sitting in with the band at Nassau Coliseum in Uniondale, New York, on March 29, 1990, and Oakland Coliseum Arena on December 31, 1990; the entire Nassau show appears as the vault release Wake Up to Find Out, and again at Madison Square Garden September 10, 1991. "Dark Star" appeared 26 times in 1991-1994, mostly in versions lasting ten minutes or less -- notably at Oakland Coliseum October 31, 1991 with Ken Kesey and again on December 12, 1992, and at Madison Square Garden September 22, 1993 with tenor master David Murray sitting in.

In 1993, Phil Lesh approached music collage artist John Oswald to do a project with "Dark Star". Oswald was given recording tapes over a hundred different performances of the song from between 1968 and 1993. Oswald then built, layered, and "folded" these many performances to produce two large, recomposed versions, one running 59:59, and the second 46:46. The project is called Grayfolded. This is the only recording to include performances by every member of the group, from inception in 1965 through 1995. The final live performance of "Dark Star" by the Grateful Dead occurred on March 30, 1994, at The Omni in Atlanta, Georgia.

== Notable performances ==
During the period when the Grateful Dead were mixing their first official live album Live/Dead, the band played a run of four shows at San Francisco's Fillmore West performing and recording "Dark Star" every night, in which they selected the February 27, 1969, performance for inclusion on their Live/Dead album. All four shows have been released as the Fillmore West 1969: The Complete Recordings box set. During this period, "Dark Star" began to take thematic shape and became a cornerstone of the Dead's jamming.

A well-loved performance, considered by many fans to be the peak rendition of "Dark Star" is from the Fillmore East on February 13, 1970. This performance of the song includes the "Feelin' Groovy Jam", so-called because of its passing resemblance to "The 59th Street Bridge Song (Feelin' Groovy)" by Simon and Garfunkel. Other listeners favor Winterland, San Francisco, November 11, 1973, as the peak performance. The Dead performed Dark Star eleven times in their 1972 Europe tour, in which all were included in the official complete release of the tour.

In an unofficial survey of the Grateful Dead's fans, the performance most cited is the Veneta, Oregon, "Dark Star" of August 27, 1972. A list of top ten officially released Dark Stars in that "deadhead" pick includes:

- August 27, 1972 (Veneta, Oregon) (on Sunshine Daydream)
- February 13, 1970 (New York City) (on Dick's Picks Volume 4)
- February 27, 1969 (San Francisco) (on Live/Dead and Fillmore West 1969: The Complete Recordings)
- February 18, 1971 (Port Chester, NY) (on American Beauty 50th Anniversary Deluxe Edition) which includes the so-called "Beautiful Jam"
- November 11, 1973 (San Francisco) (on Winterland 1973: The Complete Recordings)
- October 31, 1971 (Columbus, Ohio) (on Dick's Picks Volume 2)
- September 21, 1972 (Philadelphia, PA) (on Dick's Picks Volume 36)
- April 8, 1972 (London) (on Europe '72: The Complete Recordings)
- May 11, 1972 (Rotterdam) (on Europe '72: The Complete Recordings)
- December 6, 1973 (Cleveland, Ohio) (on Road Trips Volume 4 Number 3 2011 Bonus Disc)

=== Other notable Dark Stars include ===
- Winterland, San Francisco October 25, 1969. (22:02)
- Family Dog at the Great Highway, San Francisco November 2, 1969 (30:06) (on Dave's Picks Volume 43)
- Mammoth Gardens, Denver April 24, 1970 (24:39)
- Dusseldorf April 24, 1972 (42:58 including an embedded Me & My Uncle) (on Europe '72: The Complete Recordings)
- London May 25, 1972. (35:13) (on Europe '72: The Complete Recordings)
- Philadelphia Spectrum September 21, 1972 (37:18) (on Dick's Picks Volume 36)
- Waterbury, CT September 24, 1972 (34:13) (on 30 Trips Around The Sun)
- Kansas City November 13, 1972. (34:13)
- Hofheinz Pavillon, Houston November 19, 1972 (31:40 with WRS Suite Prelude)
- Winterland, San Francisco December 11, 1972 (32:43)
- Oklahoma City October 19, 1973 (28:49) (on Dick's Picks Volume 19)
- Winterland October 18, 1974 (Seastones 25:54 > jam 11:47 > Dark Star 23:51) (on The Grateful Dead Movie Soundtrack)
- Miami Arena October 26, 1989. (29:06) (on 30 Trips Around the Sun)
- Washington, D.C. July 12, 1990. (25:18)
- Madison Square Garden, New York September 20, 1990. (31:38 with a 5 minute Playin in the Band jam embedded) (on Road Trips Volume 2 Number 1)
