= The 31st of February (album) =

Studio album by The 31st of February
- Released: 1968
- Genre: Psychedelic rock
- Length: 37:05
- Label: Vanguard
- Producer: Steve Alaimo

The 31st of February is the debut album by The 31st of February.

== Track listing ==
1. "Sandcastles" (Dan Penn/Spooner Oldham/Chips Moman) - 2:55
2. "Porcelain Mirrors" (Scott Boyer) - 2:55
3. "Broken Day" (David Brown) - 2:56
4. "Wrong" (David Brown) - 2:11
5. "The Greener Isle" (Jackie DeShannon) - 2:45
6. "Cod'ine" (Buffy Sainte-Marie) - 6:17
7. "A Different Kind of Head" (David Brown) - 2:46
8. "Pedestals" (Scott Boyer) - 2:25
9. "Free" (Scott Boyer) - 2:29
10. "A Nickel's Worth of Benny's Help" (Scott Boyer) - 4:22
11. "Pick a Gripe" (Claude Trucks/Scott Boyer) - 2:06
12. "Cries of Treason" (Scott Boyer) - 3:09

== Personnel ==
- Scott Boyer: guitar, vocals
- David Brown: bass
- Butch Trucks: drums
