= Morning Dew =

1962 song by Bonnie Dobson

Song by Bonnie Dobson

from the album Bonnie Dobson at Folk City
- Released: August 1962
- Genre: Folk
- Label: Prestige International
- Songwriter: Bonnie Dobson

"Morning Dew", also known as "(Walk Me Out in the) Morning Dew", is a contemporary folk song by Canadian singer-songwriter Bonnie Dobson. The lyrics relate a fictional conversation in a post-nuclear holocaust world. Originally recorded as a solo performance, Dobson's vocal is accompanied by her finger-picked acoustic guitar playing.

In 1962, "Morning Dew" was included on the album Bonnie Dobson at Folk City. Subsequently, the song was recorded by other contemporary folk and rock musicians, including the Grateful Dead, who adapted it using an electric rock-ensemble arrangement for their debut album. Tim Rose recorded a version in 1967, and he claimed lyrics-writing credits with no evidence to support his claim; legal action in 1998 resulted in full credit returning to Dobson.

== Background and lyrics ==
The song is a dialogue between the last man and woman left alive following an apocalyptic catastrophe. Dobson stated that the inspiration for "Morning Dew" was the film On the Beach, which is about the survivors of virtual global annihilation by nuclear holocaust. Dobson wrote the song while staying with a friend in Los Angeles; she recalled how the guests at her friend's apartment were speculating about a nuclear war's aftermath and "after everyone went to bed, I sat up and suddenly I just started writing this song [although] I had never written [a song] in my life".

== Renditions ==
Dobson first performed "Morning Dew" at the inaugural Mariposa Folk Festival in Orillia, Ontario, in August 1961. She later played it at an acoustic session with Bob Dylan and Phil Ochs at Gerde's Folk City in New York. The song, along with Ochs's and Dylan's songs from the session, was subsequently printed in the folk music publication Broadside. Dobson lacked a music publisher at the time it appeared in Broadside, which led to problems with the rights later on. She recorded "Morning Dew" shortly after at the Folkways studio. A recording is included on her album At Folk City which was released in August 1962.

The earliest cover version of "Morning Dew" was by The Briarwood Singers on their album Well, Well, Well released in January 1964. The record fails to give credit to Dobson, and credits the song to "O. Brown". The next version is on the self-titled album by the Goldebriars, using the title "Come Walk Me Out" and also without songwriter credit to Dobson. It was followed about a month later by singer and guitarist Fred Neil with Vince Martin, for their album Tear Down The Walls. It credits Dobson for the song. Tim Rose followed with a version for his 1967 self-titled debut album, which claimed partial writing credit by Rose. Rose took advantage of a loophole in US copyright law to trick Dobson out of full composition rights for the song (Rose had previously made dubious claims of authorship to "Hey Joe"). According to Dobson, "all Tim Rose did was take Freddie Neil's changes". Dobson never met Rose, but she received 75% songwriting royalty as she retains sole writing credit for the song's music.

"Morning Dew" became part of the Grateful Dead's repertoire after frontman Jerry Garcia was introduced to the Fred Neil recording by roadie Laird Grant in 1966. The group electrified the song and first played it as their opening number at the Human Be-In in January 1967; the same month the group recorded a studio version of it for their self-titled debut album, which was released that March. (A lengthy, iconic live version was later included on their double album, Europe '72.) Morning Dew became a concert-going fan favorite, and the Grateful Dead played it live 274 times over nearly three decades, concluding with their performance on 21 June 1995, part of their East Coast summer tour, and less than two months before Jerry Garcia's death on 9 August 1995. Around the time of the Dead's version, Duane & Greg Allman recorded a demo version of "Morning Dew" that was released as a single following Duane Allman's death in 1971.

American psychedelic rock band The West Coast Pop Art Experimental Band released their cover of "Morning Dew" under the title "Will You Walk With Me" in February 1967 on their album Part One. The Pozo-Seco Singers also released a single of the song in 1967, as did Episode Six in the U.K. British pop singer Lulu recorded a version of "Morning Dew" for her album Love Loves to Love Lulu, produced by John Paul Jones, in 1967, and this was released as a single in the US, Canada (#55), and Australia in 1968.

With Rod Stewart on vocals, the Jeff Beck Group recorded a version on their 1968 album Truth that carried over some aspects of the Fred Neil version, including the bass part. Cleveland, Ohio, rock band Damnation of Adam Blessing covered "Morning Dew" on their 1969 self-titled debut. Scottish rockers Nazareth covered the song on their 1971 debut in a version with an extended arrangement similar to the Jeff Beck Group's, and released a single version the following year. "Morning Dew" was also performed by Duane and Greg Allman on their album released by Bold Records. Irish band Clannad included a rendition on their self-titled debut album. Long John Baldry did "Morning Dew" on his self-titled 1980 release and released it as a single the same year. American band Blackfoot also covered it to open their 1984 album Vertical Smiles. The German band Einstürzende Neubauten included a version of "Morning Dew" on their album Fünf auf der nach oben offenen Richterskala of 1987. Devo covered the song on Smooth Noodle Maps released in 1990. Robert Plant covered the song on his 2002 album Dreamland, and performed it live with Dobson herself in 2013. The Grateful Dead performed the song during their farewell run of shows in 2015. The following year, The National recorded a version for Grateful Dead tribute compilation album. Skating Polly also did a rendition of the song on their 2016 album, The Big Fit. As of 2024, "Morning Dew" has been performed live by Dead & Company 45 times.
