= Bonnie Dobson =

Canadian folk music songwriter, singer, and guitarist (born 1940)

- Born: Bonnie Dobson; November 13, 1940 (age 86); Toronto, Ontario, Canada
- Known for: Morning Dew
- Musical career
- Genre: Contemporary folk music
- Occupations: singer; songwriter
- Instruments: Vocals, guitar
- Label: Hornbeam

Bonnie Dobson (born November 13, 1940, in Toronto, Ontario, Canada) is a Canadian folk music songwriter, singer, and guitarist, most known in the 1960s for composing the songs "I'm Your Woman" and "Morning Dew". The latter, augmented by Tim Rose (with a controversial co-writing credit), became a melancholy folk rock standard that has been covered by numerous artists.

== Early life ==
Dobson was born in Toronto. Her father was a union organizer and opera lover. Her early music influences included Paul Robeson and The Weavers.

== Career ==
Dobson became part of the active folk-revival scene in Toronto, performing in local coffee houses and at the Mariposa Folk Festival. She later moved to the United States where she performed in coffee houses across the country and recorded several albums, including 1962's Bonnie Dobson at Folk City, which contained her song "Morning Dew".

Dobson has consistently questioned Tim Rose's right to a co-writing credit for "Morning Dew", stating that Rose first heard it as sung by Fred Neil, whose version appeared on his 1964 album Tear Down The Walls with Dobson credited as the composer.

After returning to Toronto in 1967 she continued to perform in coffee houses as well programs on the CBC. She married and in 1969 moved to London, England, where she took up university studies and later became an administrator of the Philosophy Department at Birkbeck College, part of the University of London.

After retiring in the 1980s, Dobson returned to performance in 2007 in London with Jarvis Cocker. She released a new album in 2013 on the Hornbeam label and that year performed a number of concert dates.

She performed with Combined Services Entertainment, and was one of the last performers at RAF Salalah, Oman.

== Cover versions of "Morning Dew" ==
According to the website SecondHandSongs, "Morning Dew" has been covered by more than 70 artists, including several versions as recently as the early 2020s. Among those who have recorded the song are Fred Neil, Ralph McTell, Lulu, Nazareth, Grateful Dead, Jeff Beck Group, Robert Plant, Long John Baldry, DEVO, Einstürzende Neubauten, Marc Almond and Gregg Allman, Duane Allman, and Butch Trucks (of The Allman Brothers Band).

== Discography ==
- 1961: Bonnie Dobson Sings 'She's Like a Swallow' and Other Folk Songs (Prestige International 13021; Prestige/Folklore Records 14015 [1963])
- 1962: Dear Companion (Prestige International 13031; Prestige/Folklore Records 14007 [1963])
- 1962: Bonnie Dobson at Folk City [live] (Prestige International 13057; Prestige/Folklore Records 14018 [1963]) (featuring "Morning Dew")
- 1964: Bonnie Dobson Sings a Merry-Go-Round of Children's Songs (Prestige International 13064)
- 1964: Hootenanny with Bonnie Dobson (Prestige Folklore 14018)
- 1964: For the Love of Him (Mercury MG-20987/SR-60987)
- 1969: Bonnie Dobson (RCA Victor LSP-4219) (I Got Stung #82 CanPop / #7 CanCon - August 1969)
- 1970: Good Morning Rain (RCA Victor LSP-4277) (Good Morning Rain - recommended CanCon May 1970)
- 1972: Bonnie Dobson (Argo [UK] Records ZFB 79) (featuring "Land of the Silver Birch")
- 1976: Morning Dew (Polydor [UK] Records 2383 400)
- 2014: Take Me for a Walk in the Morning Dew (Hornbeam [UK] Records HBR 0003)
- 2025:’Dreams’ Bonnie Dobson and the Hanging Stars (Loose Music [UK] VJCD291)
