= Woman with a Fan =

Woman with a Fan or Lady with a Fan may refer to:

- Woman with a Fan (Picasso, 1908), an oil painting
- Woman with a Fan (Picasso, 1909), an oil painting
- Woman with a Fan (Metzinger, 1913), a painting by Metzinger, c. 1913
- Woman with a Fan (Metzinger, 1912), a painting by Metzinger, 1912
- The Lady with a Fan (Velázquez), an oil painting, c. 1638–1639
- "Lady with a Fan", a section of the 1977 song suite "Terrapin Part 1" by the Grateful Dead
- A Lady with a Fan, a 1645–1650 painting by Ferdinand Bol
- Portrait of a Young Woman with a Fan, a 1633 portrait painting by Rembrandt
- Lady with a Fan (Klimt), Dame mit Fächer, a painting by Gustav Klimt, 1917/1918
