= Terrapin Station =

1977 studio album by the Grateful Dead

Studio album by Grateful Dead
- Released: July 27, 1977
- Recorded: February–July 1977 (including mixing)
- Studios: Sound City, Van Nuys; Automated Sound, New York City; AIR, London; Trident, London; Abbey Road, London
- Genres: Progressive rock; jazz rock
- Length: 35:38
- Label: Arista
- Producer: Keith Olsen

Grateful Dead chronology
Steal Your Face (1976)	Terrapin Station (1977)	What a Long Strange Trip It's Been (1977)

Singles from Terrapin Station
- 1. "Dancin' in the Streets" Released: October 1977; 2. "Passenger" Released: November 1977

Professional ratings
Review scores
Source	Rating
AllMusic	2/5 stars
Christgau's Record Guide	B
The Encyclopedia of Popular Music	4/5 stars
Rolling Stone	4/5 stars

Terrapin Station is the ninth studio album by the American rock band the Grateful Dead, released on July 27, 1977. It was the band's first release for Arista Records and their first studio effort following a two-year hiatus from full-scale touring. Produced by Keith Olsen, who was hired by Arista president Clive Davis to refine the band's sound, the album marked a significant departure from their previous improvisational and Americana styles by incorporating a polished production and orchestral arrangements by Paul Buckmaster without the band's knowledge.

The album is best known for its title track, "Terrapin Part 1", a 16-minute progressive rock suite that occupies the entire second side. Other notable tracks include the reggae-influenced "Estimated Prophet" and a disco-inflected cover of "Dancing in the Street". While the orchestral overdubs were initially controversial among band members—with lead guitarist Jerry Garcia famously remarking that Olsen had "put the Grateful Dead in a dress"—the album's material became a cornerstone of their live performances for the remainder of their career.

Terrapin Station reached No. 28 on the Billboard 200 and was certified gold by the RIAA in 1987. Its cover art, featuring two dancing terrapins drawn by Heinrich Kley, introduced some of the most enduring imagery in the band's iconography. Contemporary critics have praised the album's ambition and musicality, with Rolling Stone later citing 1977 as the "Grateful Dead's Greatest Year" in conjunction with the tour supporting the release. It was voted No. 848 in the third edition of Colin Larkin's All Time Top 1000 Albums.

== Background ==
With the folding of their own record label and a change in management, the Grateful Dead signed with recently founded Arista Records. Label head Clive Davis had been interested in working with the band since his time at Columbia Records and had previously signed their colleagues New Riders of the Purple Sage. He added the Dead to the label with the agreement that they work under an outside producer – something they had not tried on a studio album since Anthem of the Sun (1968), though American Beauty (1970) had been co-produced by engineer Stephen Barncard. After talks with several prospoects, including Val Garay and Eagles producer Bill Szymczyk, they settled on Keith Olsen. The band temporarily moved to Los Angeles, as Olsen preferred to work at Sound City, where he had recently achieved success producing Fleetwood Mac's self-titled 1975 album.

Olsen had a method for reining in the Dead: "During the cutting of the basic tracks it was pretty hard to get every member of the band in the studio at the same time ... so [Steve] Parish went out to the hardware store and got these giant nails and a great big hammer and as soon as everybody was in, he hammered the door shut from the inside ... we didn't have drifters from the other studios coming in to listen. We didn't have people leaving to go screw around elsewhere. We started getting work done." Recording of the basic tracks went smoothly. Olsen managed to mic up both drummers in the studio without intruding on each other or their bandmates, which was a longstanding issue on previous albums.

With Fleetwood Mac, Olsen had a hands-on approach, orchestrating the addition of Lindsey Buckingham and Stevie Nicks and influencing song choice, arrangements and sequencing. He entered the Terrapin Station sessions with similar expectations, imagining a concept album or song cycle. However, Olsen said that Davis told him: "I need a commercial record out of them." This caused some friction during the sessions as well as with the end results. Kreutzmann said: "He'd have us play the same thing over and over again, and we're not really the type of band that can put up with that. ... Our very identity is based on the opposite principle." With the tracks put down the Grateful Dead went out on tour, leaving the tapes with Olsen, who augmented the songs with added orchestrations and choir parts without the band's consent, in particular a horn section on "Dancing in the Street", "Sunrise" and "Terrapin, Part 1". Garcia regretted not attending the orchestra sessions in London with Olsen and called the orchestrations "a little overripe" and felt some of the parts could have been improved.

== Songs ==
=== Side one ===
Fortunately we had a chance to play [Estimated Prophet and Terrapin Part I] three times onstage and it made a huge difference ... Then we came back and we knew what the songs were about.

— Bob Weir

Rhythm guitarist Bob Weir's "Estimated Prophet" was written in septuple time. His lyrics for the song (finished with writing partner John Barlow) examine a character's delusions of grandeur and California's propensity for false prophets. The song also quotes "Ezekiel Saw the Wheel". Drummer Bill Kreutzmann said "It's a great song but when [Weir] brought it to us, something was off. It needed a groove. It was in quick 7/4 but it didn't swing. Yet. For my homework that night, I combined two fast sevens and played half-time over it. The two sevens brought the time around to an even number – the phrasing is in two bars of seven, so technically the time signature is in 14/8. But that's getting technical. In layman's terms, 'Estimated Prophet' suddenly grooved."

"Dancin' in the Streets" is a cover of Martha & the Vandellas' "Dancing in the Street" from the early days of the band, given a new arrangement that prominently features singer Donna Godchaux. For the studio version, a funk-influenced guitar figure was added to a four-on-the-floor disco beat and polished with a commercial production contemporary to the era.

Bassist Phil Lesh's "Passenger" was inspired by Fleetwood Mac's "Station Man". The lyrics were written by ordained Buddhist monk Peter Zimels. However, as Lesh had stopped singing during this period due to vocal cord damage from improper singing technique, Weir and Donna Godchaux sang lead for both the recording and when it was later added to live set lists.

Weir's "Samson & Delilah" was a new arrangement of Reverend Gary Davis's traditional song, retelling the story from the Tanakh. Weir had taken several guitar lessons from Davis at his Queens, New York, home prior to his death in 1972.

The highly orchestrated "Sunrise" was Donna's first singing-songwriting effort for the Grateful Dead. (She and band pianist Keith Godchaux had written the songs for their duo effort Keith & Donna two years prior, on Dead spin-off label Round Records.) The song has been acknowledged as a tribute to the band's recently deceased road manager, Rex Jackson, for whom the Dead's charitable Rex Foundation was later named.

=== Side two ===
Lyricist Robert Hunter wrote the lyrics for the first part of the "Terrapin Station" suite in a single sitting, during a rare Bay Area lightning storm. On the same day, driving across the Richmond–San Rafael Bridge, lead guitarist Jerry Garcia was struck by the idea for a singular melodic line. He turned his car around and hurried home to set it down in notation before it escaped him. Hunter said "When we met the next day, I showed him the words and he said, 'I've got the music.' They dovetailed perfectly and Terrapin edged into this dimension." He based the lyrics for the "Lady with a Fan" section on a traditional English folk song known variously as "The Lady of Carlisle", "The Bold Lieutenant" and "The Lion's Den". The ballad is No. 396 on the Roud Folk Song Index. It is also O 25 on the Laws list, which synopsizes "The lady decides to choose between two brothers who love her by determining which is braver. She tosses her fan into a lion's den and asks them to retrieve it." Hunter, who was also influenced by Sir Walter Scott, had composed "Terrapin Station" in two parts, the second never recorded or performed by the Grateful Dead.

Drummer Bill Kreutzmann ironed out the arrangement, explaining "We sat down and mapped it out. I said, 'This is how the song goes.' I showed [Mickey] all the parts that I felt worked really well, he added a couple, and that's what the song is today. We went back into the studio the next night and got it right. With the drum parts worked out, everything else snapped together like puzzle pieces."

== Production ==
The final overdubs were recorded at Automated Sound in New York City while the Dead toured the region. Olsen then added strings, horns and choirs to the tracks at studios in London, unrequested by the band. For "Estimated Prophet", Donna's vocals were multi-tracked and he had Tom Scott add lyricon and saxophone. In a further quest for commercial potential, he ignored other contributions. Kreutzmann commented

Mickey [Hart] had a cool timbale part that he recorded, with Garcia adding interplay on guitar. But Olsen had another idea. Without telling anyone in the band, he erased Mickey's part entirely and then hired a string section to fill out that passage instead. I was pissed off about it, but Mickey was deservedly outraged. Outraged. ... it was a very stupid thing to do. Mickey wasn't going to be had that easily, though, and so he and Garcia – who sided with Mickey – redid their part. Olsen wasn't going to give up either, so he made sure the strings remained in the final mix. The recorded version of "Terrapin Station" is probably my least favorite version because of that. It sounds really grandiose, like somebody's ego is playing those strings.

Weir likewise felt "All the orchestration and choral stuff was given too much prominence ... so we began this long negotiation, as it were, to put it in a more reasonable perspective. Keith was real stoked – he'd gone over to England and gotten these parts ... I thought it had to be backpedaled considerably. Keith said 'I'm going to bring Tom Scott in' ... I didn't know there was going to be anything added on "Estimated Prophet". Nonetheless, Weir worked with the producer that summer, taking advantage of an offer by Davis to record his second solo album, Heaven Help the Fool, for Arista.

== Release ==
The cover artwork was produced by Kelley/Mouse Studios, who had created several previous works for the band. The image of the terrapins playing instruments on the cover was drawn by Heinrich Kley. Though a terrapin appears in the lyrics only as a place name, dancing terrapins feature prominently in the artwork and afterward became part of the large iconography associated with the Grateful Dead. The front cover image takes the idea of a "terrapin station" literally. The back cover features a stylized, one-eyed skull with a crossed bone, feathers and roses, in keeping with the imagery that had evolved around the Dead.

Though the heavy sound production was of its time, it was unusual for a Grateful Dead album and a departure from their earlier, edgier psychedelic albums or their more recent americana or jazz-blues efforts. Garcia said Olsen had "put the Grateful Dead in a dress". Unhappy with the string sections and choirs on the title suite, he complained "It made me mad. He and Paul Buckmaster had an erroneous rhythmic sense; they changed it from a dotted shuffle to a marching 4/4 time." Lesh said "The orchestral and choral sweeteners added to the title sequence by Olsen and Buckmaster were a classic example of gilding the lily." Reaction to the production from both fans and critics was similar, with a more positive response to the songs themselves.

A vehicular accident involving drummer Mickey Hart prevented a summer tour supporting the release of Terrapin Station, and while Weir returned to the studio with Olsen, Garcia focused on exhibiting The Grateful Dead Movie, and the Jerry Garcia Band and Cats Under the Stars. All of the songs on the album were played live, with "Terrapin Station", "Estimated Prophet" and "Samson and Delilah" staying in concert rotation until the dissolution of the band, usually as part of the second set. After its reappearance, "Dancin' in the Street" was played frequently while Donna Godchaux remained in the band, after which it was performed sporadically until 1987. She also sang "Sunrise" during the rest of her tenure. "Terrapin Station Part 1" was never performed live in full. The first three sections (known live as "Terrapin Station") remained on set lists, with the third generally extended into a climactic focus of the second set. The most complete performance included versions of the "Terrapin Transit", "At a Siding" (without lyrics), and "Terrapin Flyer" sections. It was performed only once (March 18, 1977, at Winterland, San Francisco). Conversely, one performance skipped the "Lady with a Fan" section – that of May 22, 1977, at Hollywood Sportatorium in Pembroke Pines (see Dick's Picks Volume 3).

Two singles were released from the album. Davis selected "Dancin' in the Streets" as the first, in a different mix featuring a horn section that Olsen had wanted to add to the album mix. The second single featured "Passenger". Both singles were backed with "Terrapin Station", an excerpt of the album's "Terrapin Part 1" featuring the second section and part of the third (i.e. "Terrapin Station>Terrapin"). Domestic CD copies substitute the album version of "Dancin' in the Streets" with the single mix.

Terrapin Station was first released on CD in 1986. In 2004 it was expanded and remastered for the Beyond Description box set. This version was released individually in 2006. Initial releases did not list time lengths for individual sections of "Terrapin Part 1", though the sections were apparent by style and authorship. Various CD releases break the song down into individual track sections, albeit some with nebulous track boundaries.

== Track listing ==
Side one
No.	Title	Writer(s)	Lead singer(s)	Length
1.	"Estimated Prophet"	Bob Weir; John Perry Barlow	Weir	5:35
2.	"Dancin' in the Streets"	William Stevenson; Marvin Gaye; I.J. Hunter	Weir; Donna Godchaux	3:30
3.	"Passenger"	Phil Lesh; Peter Monk	Weir; Godchaux	2:48
4.	"Samson & Delilah"	Trad., arranged by Weir	Weir	3:30
5.	"Sunrise"	Godchaux	Godchaux	4:05

Side two
No.	Title	Lead singer	Length
6.	"Terrapin Part 1": "Lady with a Fan" (Garcia, Robert Hunter) – 4:40; "Terrapin Station" (Garcia, Hunter) - 1:54; "Terrapin" (Garcia, Hunter) - 2:11; "Terrapin Transit" (Mickey Hart, Bill Kreutzmann) - 1:27; "At a Siding" (Hart, Hunter) - 0:55; "Terrapin Flyer" (Hart, Kreutzmann) - 3:00; "Refrain" (Garcia) - 2:16"	Jerry Garcia	16:23

2006 reissue bonus tracks
No.	Title	Writer(s)	Length
7.	"Peggy-O" (Instrumental studio outtake)	Trad., arranged by Grateful Dead	4:41
8.	"The Ascent" (Instrumental studio outtake)	Grateful Dead	1:59
9.	"Catfish John" (Studio outtake)	Bob McDill; Allen Reynolds	4:43
10.	"Equinox" (Studio outtake)	Lesh	5:15
11.	"Fire on the Mountain" (Studio outtake)	Hart; Hunter	6:26
12.	"Dancin' in the Streets" (Live at Cornell University, Ithaca, New York on May 8, 1977)	Stevenson; Gaye; Hunter	16:17

== Personnel ==
Grateful Dead

- Jerry Garcia – guitar, vocals
- Donna Jean Godchaux – vocals
- Keith Godchaux – keyboards, pianos, synthesizers, vocals
- Mickey Hart – drums, vibes
- Bill Kreutzmann – drums
- Phil Lesh – bass guitar
- Bob Weir – guitar, vocals

Additional performers

- Paul Buckmaster – orchestral arrangements
- The English Chorale (Musical Director Robert Howes)
- The Martyn Ford Orchestra
- Tom Scott – lyricon, saxophones on "Estimated Prophet"

Technical personnel

- Rick Collins – mastering
- Greg Fulginiti – mastering
- Keith Olsen – production, engineering

Reissue production credits

- James Austin – production
- Hugh Brown – design, art direction
- Reggie Collins – annotation
- Dave Devore – engineering
- Jimmy Edwards – associate production
- Sheryl Farber – editorial supervision
- Tom Flye – mixing
- Cornelius "Snookey" Flowers – photography
- David Gans – liner notes
- Joe Gastwirt – mastering, production consultancy
- Robert Gatley – mixing assistance
- Robin Hurley – associate production
- Eileen Law – research
- David Lemieux – production
- Mary Ann Mayer – art coordination
- Richard McCaffrey – photography
- Hale Milgrim – associate production
- Robert Minkin – photography
- Scott Pascucci – associate production
- Ed Perlstein – photography
- Cameron Sears – executive production
- Peter Simon – photography
- Steve Vance – design, art direction

== Charts and certifications ==
Billboard

Year	Chart	Position
1977	Pop Albums	28

RIAA Certification

Certification	Date
Gold	September 4, 1987
