= Dick's Picks Volume 18 =

Live album by Grateful Dead
- Released: June 2000
- Recorded: February 3–5, 1978
- Genres: Rock, jam
- Length: 228:32
- Label: Grateful Dead

Grateful Dead chronology
Dick's Picks Volume 17 (2000)	Dick's Picks Volume 18 (2000)	View from the Vault (2000)

Dick's Picks Volume 18 is a three-CD live album by the rock band the Grateful Dead. It was recorded on February 3, 1978, at the Dane County Coliseum in Madison, Wisconsin and on February 5, 1978, at the UNI-Dome in Cedar Falls, Iowa. There are also two songs from the February 4, 1978 show at the Milwaukee Auditorium in Milwaukee, Wisconsin. The album was released in June 2000.

Disc 1 combines songs from the February 3, 4, and 5 concerts in an order designed to simulate a first set of a Dead concert from that era. Disc 2 contains most of the second set plus the encore from the February 3 show. Disc 3 includes all of the second set from February 5.

== Enclosure, article, and fan letter ==
Included in this release is a single-sheet of paper folded into fourths accordion-style, yielding an eight-page enclosure. The front matches the front cover of the CD, and the two pages immediately inside list the credits for the release underneath a wide black-and-white photograph of the entire band on stage. The next two pages list the contents of the release interspersed with smaller black-and-white photographs focusing more on each of the band's members.

The enclosure also features two pages containing a collage consisting of a newspaper clipping and a letter to guitarist Jerry Garcia from a fan, with the fan letter partially covered up by a black-and-white photo of the band on stage.

=== Article ===
The article is entitled "There's nothing like a Grateful Dead show" and was written by Michael St. John. The CD's credits include a "Special Thanks to J. Corkey Custer/Emerald City Chronicle," which implies it is from the Emerald City Chronicle.

St. John focuses on the February 3rd show at Madison, and in the first paragraph the author mentions that "Phil Lesh said that they would have to play in Madison more often." He writes that the two drummers, Mickey Hart and Bill Kreutzmann, "play together, and off one another, as if they were one." The author goes on to state that "This reciprocal action and reaction is characteristic of how the Dead play in general", and that when they played newer songs off their recent studio release, Terrapin Station, they substituted "intricate improvization" for "the orchestration" on the release.

St. John ends his article by stating "Madison hopes that you remember us on your next tour, Phil."

=== Fan letter ===
The fan letter is hand-written, dated February 4, 1978, and signed by Paul, a 20-year-old guitarist who is "primarily a jazz fan of the Miles Davis school."

Paul writes of how he was impressed by both Jerry's "long improvisations" and his "shorter breaks in the first set", and claims that "you are one of the great stylists of guitar." The letter-writer goes on to state that "What really impressed [me] last night was seeing an established player like yourself who is still practicing and growing - it's really an inspiration to me as [a] guitarist to keep me progressing."

After mentioning how he enjoyed seeing Django Reinhardt's "influence in your playing", Jerry's fan closes by writing "Someday, if I get the opportunity, I'd like to meet you as you've been so important to me for so long from afar."

== Critical reception ==
Professional ratings
Review scores
Source	Rating
Allmusic	3/5 stars
The Music Box	5/5 stars
Rolling Stone	4/5 stars

On AllMusic, William Ruhlmann said, "The jury-rigged first set is an interesting combination of old and recent material, but the meat of the album comes on the second and third discs, which feature long medleys full of exploratory instrumental passages.... And the performances are typical, with first-set songs like "Passenger" and "The Music Never Stopped" getting feisty treatment, while the second sets run on and on with the kind of unhurried improvising that delights Deadheads and bores people not attuned to the band's tendencies."

In The Music Box, John Metzger wrote, "Each of the songs that appear on Dick's Picks 18 is exquisitely performed. Consequently, this is not just a collection for those most rabid of Grateful Dead fans with countless hours of bootleg tapes lying around their abode. Anyone who has wondered just what the big deal was with this band, just might find the answer lurking among the three hours and fifty minutes of music contained in this collection."

== Track listing ==
The track listing and recording dates are:

Disc 1
No.	Title	Recording date	Length
1.	"Bertha" (Jerry Garcia, Robert Hunter)	February 5	6:42
2.	"Good Lovin' " (Rudy Clark, Arthur Resnick)	February 5	6:14
3.	"Cold Rain and Snow" (traditional, arranged by Grateful Dead)	February 3	6:17
4.	"New Minglewood Blues" (traditional, arranged by Bob Weir)	February 5	5:42
5.	"They Love Each Other" (Garcia, Hunter)	February 3	7:42
6.	"It's All Over Now" (Bobby Womack, Shirley Womack)	February 4	7:40
7.	"Dupree's Diamond Blues" (Garcia, Hunter)	February 4	4:37
8.	"Looks Like Rain" (Weir, Barlow)	February 3	7:59
9.	"Brown-Eyed Women" (Garcia, Hunter)	February 3	5:34
10.	"Passenger" (Phil Lesh, Peter Monk)	February 5	5:41
11.	"Deal" (Garcia, Hunter)	February 5	6:35
12.	"The Music Never Stopped" (Weir, Barlow)	February 3	8:06

Disc 2 (all tracks recorded on February 3)
No.	Title	Length
1.	"Estimated Prophet >" (Weir, Barlow)	12:16
2.	"Eyes of the World >" (Garcia, Hunter)	14:38
3.	"Playing in the Band >" (Weir, Mickey Hart, Hunter)	24:35
4.	"The Wheel >" (Garcia, Bill Kreutzmann, Hunter)	5:44
5.	"Playing in the Band" (Weir, Hart, Hunter)	9:02
6.	"Johnny B. Goode" (Chuck Berry)	4:38

Disc 3 (all tracks recorded on February 5)
No.	Title	Length
1.	"Samson and Delilah" (traditional, arranged by Weir)	11:22
2.	"Scarlet Begonias >" (Garcia, Hunter)	12:46
3.	"Fire on the Mountain" (Hart, Hunter)	17:03
4.	"Truckin' >" (Garcia, Lesh, Weir, Hunter)	9:17
5.	"Drums >" (Hart, Kreutzmann)	1:57
6.	"The Other One >" (Weir, Kreutzmann)	9:02
7.	"Wharf Rat >" (Garcia, Hunter)	8:58
8.	"Around and Around" (Berry)	8:35

== Personnel ==
Grateful Dead:

- Jerry Garcia – guitar, vocals
- Donna Jean Godchaux – vocals
- Keith Godchaux – keyboards
- Mickey Hart – drums
- Bill Kreutzmann – drums
- Phil Lesh – bass, vocals
- Bob Weir – guitar, vocals

Production:

- Recording: Betty Cantor-Jackson
- Tape archivists: Dick Latvala, David Lemieux
- Mastering: Jeffrey Norman
- Photography: Bruce Polonsky, Keith Wessel

== Concert set lists ==
The set lists for the February 3, 4, and 5, 1978 concerts were:

Friday, February 3 – Dane County Coliseum, Madison, Wisconsin:

First set: "Cold Rain and Snow" (Note: Included on Dick's Picks Volume 18) · "Mexicali Blues" · "Big River" · "They Love Each Other" · "Looks Like Rain" · "Loser" · "Passenger" · "Brown-Eyed Women" · "El Paso" · "Peggy-O" · "The Music Never Stopped"

Second set: "Good Lovin' " · "Ship of Fools" · "Estimated Prophet" · "Eyes of the World" · "Playing in the Band" · "The Wheel" · "Playing in the Band"

Encore: "Johnny B. Goode"

Saturday, February 4 – Milwaukee Auditorium, Milwaukee, Wisconsin:

First set: "Jack Straw" · "Tennessee Jed" · "Mama Tried" · "Me and My Uncle" · "Row Jimmy" · "Beat It On Down the Line" · "Candyman" · "It's All Over Now" · "Deal"

Second set: "Samson and Delilah" · "Dupree's Diamond Blues" · "Dancing in the Street" · "Terrapin Station" · "Playing in the Band" · "Not Fade Away" · "Black Peter" · "Around and Around"

Encore: "One More Saturday Night"

Sunday, February 5 – UNI-Dome, Cedar Falls, Iowa:

First set: "Bertha" · "Good Lovin' " · "Brown Eyed Women" · "El Paso" · "Tennessee Jed" · "Sunrise" · "New Minglewood Blues" · "Friend of the Devil" · "Passenger" · "Deal"

Second set: "Samson and Delilah" · "Scarlet Begonias" · "Fire on the Mountain" · "Truckin' " · "Drums" · "The Other One" · "Wharf Rat" · "Around and Around"

Encore: "U.S. Blues"
