= Ferdinand Bol =

Dutch painter (1616-1680)

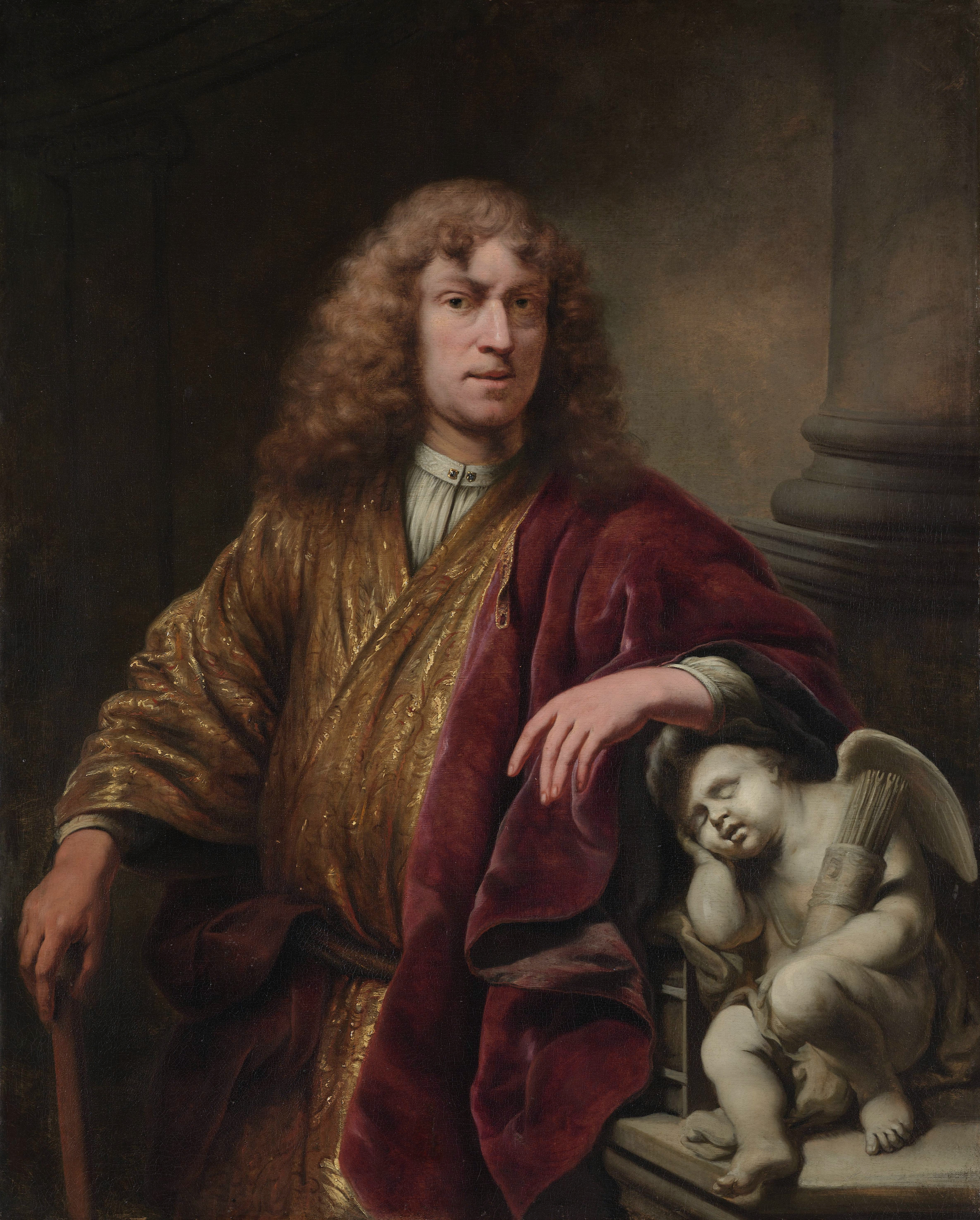
- Self-portrait (c. 1669) by Ferdinand Bol
- Born: 24 June 1616; Dordrecht, Netherlands
- Died: 24 August 1680 (aged 64); Herengracht, Netherlands
- Known for: Painting, ethching, draftsman
- Notable work: Portrait of Elisabeth Bas
- Spouse(s): Elisabeth Dell (m. 1653; died 1660); Anna van Erckel (m. 1669; died 1680)

Signature
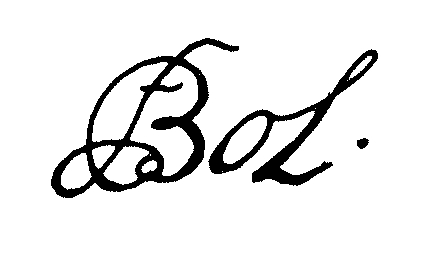

Ferdinand Bol (24 June 1616 - 24 August 1680) was a Dutch painter, etcher and draftsman. Although his surviving work is rare, it displays Rembrandt's influence; like his master, Bol favoured historical subjects, portraits, numerous self-portraits, and single figures in exotic finery.

== Biography ==
Ferdinand was born in Dordrecht as the son of a surgeon, Balthasar Bol. (Note: Twenty years later visiting Ferdinand, Balthasar was painted by Rembrandt.) Ferdinand Bol was first an apprentice of Jacob Cuyp in his hometown and/or of Abraham Bloemaert in Utrecht. After 1630, he became an apprentice of Rembrandt, living in his house in the Sint Antoniesbreestraat, then a fashionable street and area for painters, jewellers, architects, and many Flemish and Jewish immigrants. (Note: Immediate neighbours included Hendrick van Uylenburg, who rented from Nicolaes Eliasz. Pickenoy, and Govert Flinck. Pieter Lastman and David Vinckboons lived across the bridge.) In 1641, Bol started his own studio.

In 1652, he became a burgher of Amsterdam, and in 1653, he married Elisabeth Dell, whose father held positions with the Admiralty of Amsterdam and the wine merchants' guild, both institutions that later gave commissions to the artist. Within a few years (1655), he became the head of the guild and received orders to deliver two chimney pieces for rooms in the new town hall designed by Jacob van Campen, and four more for the Admiralty of Amsterdam.

Around this time, Bol was a popular and successful painter. His palette had lightened, his figures possessed greater elegance, and by the middle of the decade he was receiving more official commissions than any other artist in Amsterdam. Godfrey Kneller was his pupil. Bol delivered four paintings for the two mansions of the brothers Trip, originally also from Dordrecht.

Bol's first wife died in 1660. In 1669, Bol remarried with Anna van Erckel, widow of the treasurer of the Admiralty, and subsequently he retired from painting. In 1672, the couple moved to Keizersgracht 672, then a newly designed part of the city, and now the Museum Van Loon. Bol served as a governor in a Home for Lepers. Bol died a few weeks after his wife, on the Herengracht, where his son, a lawyer, lived.

== Artwork ==
Probably his best known painting is a portrait of Elisabeth Bas, the wife of the naval officer Jochem Swartenhont and an innkeeper near the Dam square. This and many other of his paintings would in the 19th century be falsely attributed to his master Rembrandt.

=== Gallery (selected works) ===
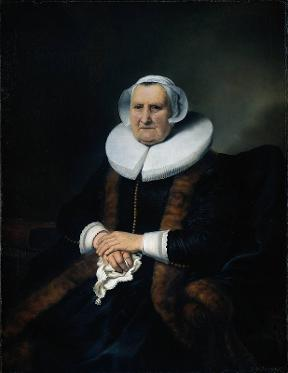
Portrait of Elisabeth Bas, Rijksmuseum, Amsterdam

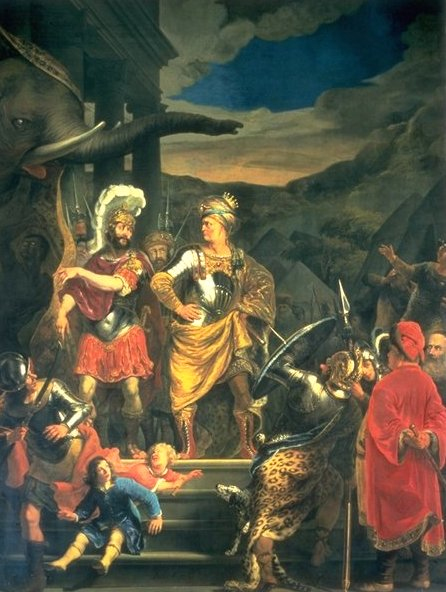
Pyrrhus shows his elephant to Fabritius, Royal Palace of Amsterdam

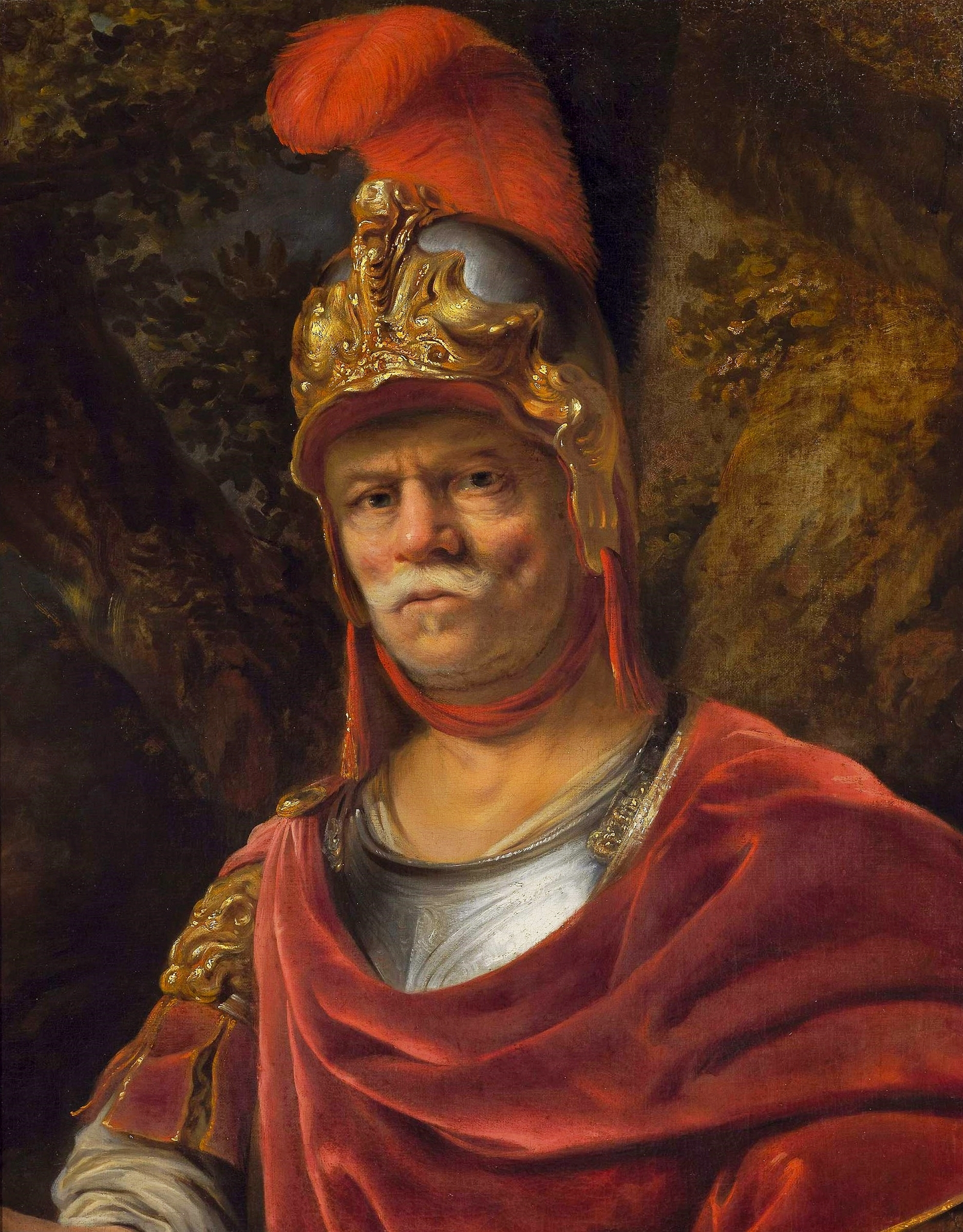
Man in golden helmet (Mars), National Museum, Warsaw

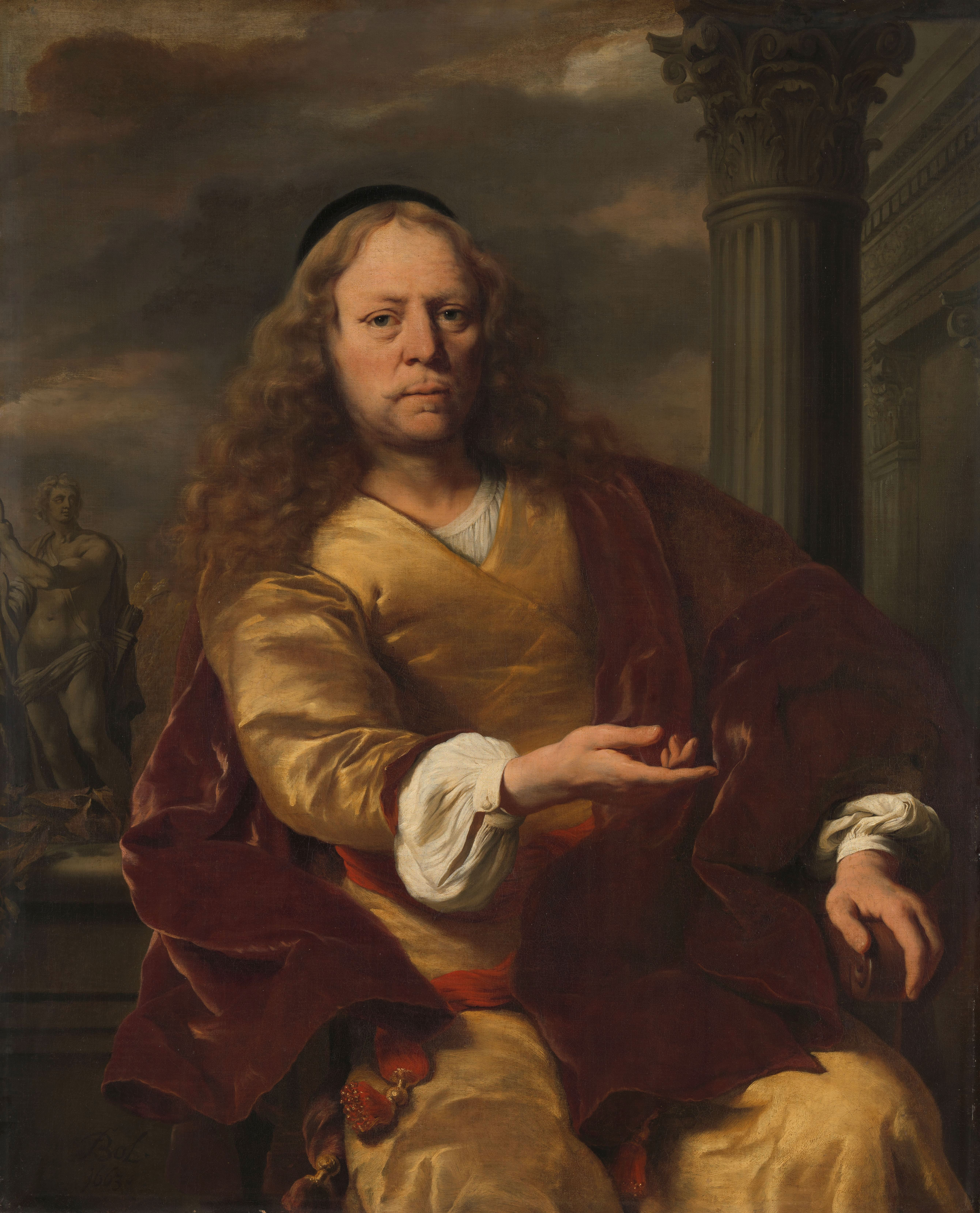
Portrait of a Man, Rijksmuseum, Amsterdam

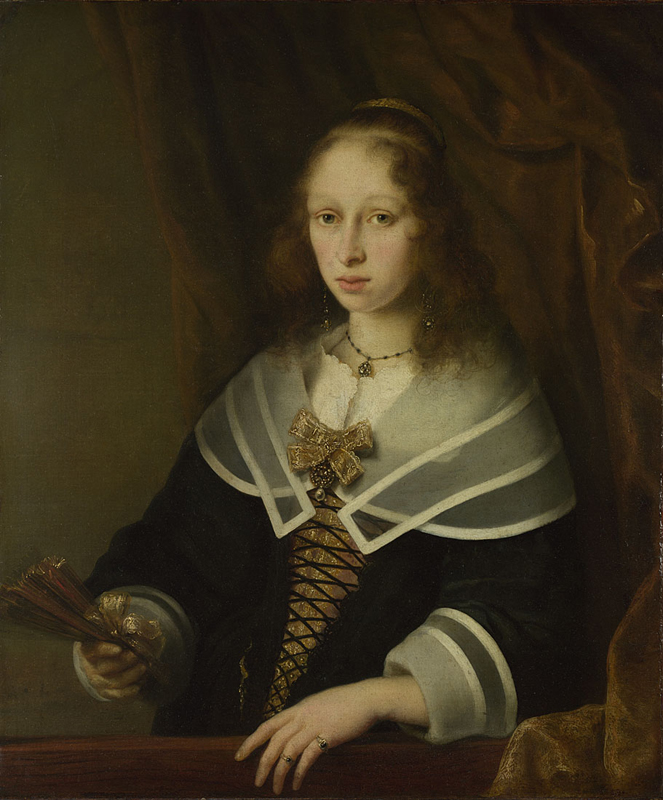
A Lady with a Fan, National Gallery, London

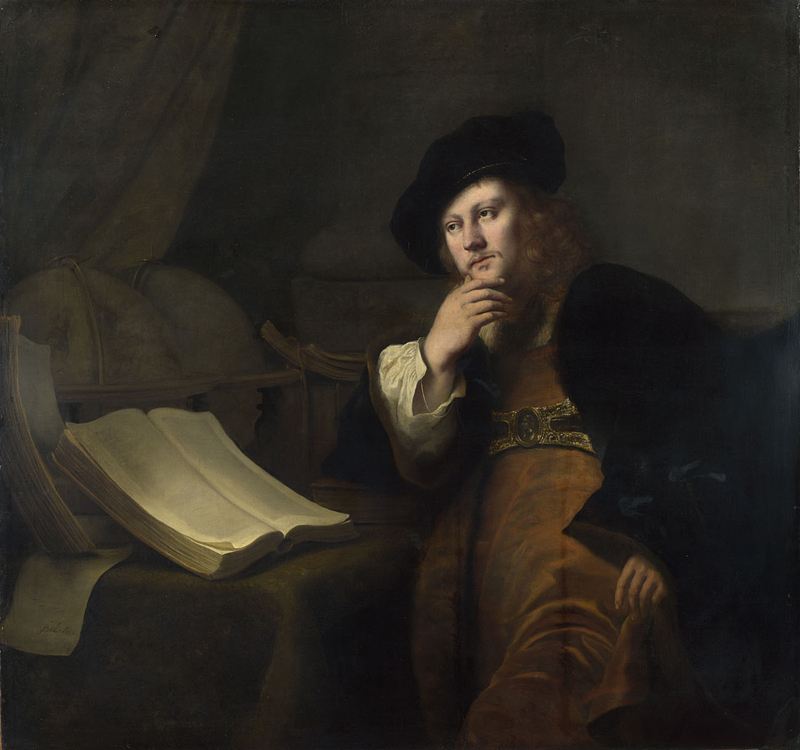
An Astronomer, National Gallery, London

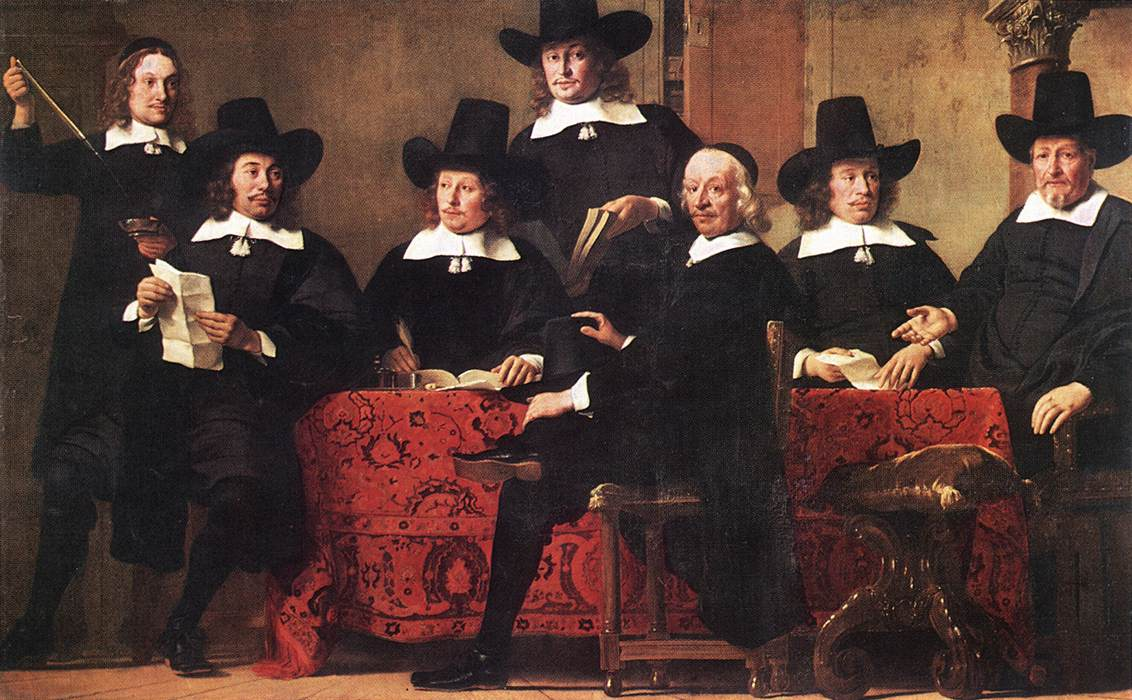
Governors of the Wine Merchant's Guild, Alte Pinakothek, Munich
