= Miami-Hollywood Motorsports Park =

Auto racing complex in Pembroke Pines, Florida

Coordinates: 26.008803°N 80.369556°W

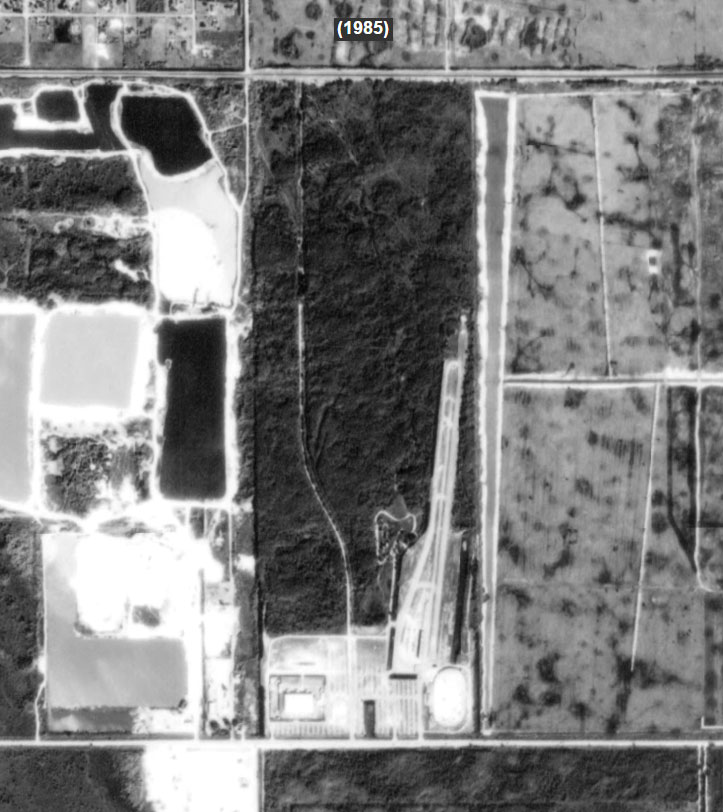
- Historical Aerial view Miami Hollywood Racetrack, 1985
- Location: 16661 Pines Blvd., Pembroke Pines, Florida
- Owner: Stephen Calder and Norman Johnson
- Opened: March 1966
- Construction cost: $500,000

Oval
- Length: 0.6 km (0.37 mi)
- Turns: 4

Strip
- Length: 0.4 km (0.25 mi)

The Miami-Hollywood Motorsports Park was an auto racing complex in Pembroke Pines, Florida. Opened in March 1966, it was located east of the Hollywood Sportatorium near the corner of 172nd Avenue and what was then Hollywood Boulevard (now Pines Boulevard).

The speedway featured a quarter-mile (0.4 km) dragstrip as well as an 0.375 mile (0.6 km) oval track. It went through many name changes over its long history, including Miami Speedway, Miami Speedway Park, Miami Dragway, Miami-Hollywood Speedway, and others.

== History ==
=== Early years and prime ===
The speedway was built with a one-third banked oval, a drag strip, and a road racing course. There were plans to have a super speedway oval (similar to that at Daytona) and a 5.2 mile road course similar to Riverside in California to be constructed in 1971, but those plans were never realized. Home to many famous races, the speedway was a nationally recognized National Hot Rod Association racetrack. The International Hot Rod Association held its Winter Nationals at Miami-Hollywood in 1975 and 1976. The track also held the annual Coca-Cola Funny Car Cavalcade of Stars. Numerous well-known drag racers came to race, such as "Big Daddy" Don Garlits, "Jungle Jim" Liberman, Dale Armstrong, "TV Tommy" Ivo, and Shirley Muldowney.

Famous cars such as Hemi Under Glass, Blue Max, Color Me Gone, and Little Red Wagon appeared at the speedway. It was also the site of stunt acts, such as Jim "Bullet" Bailey being dragged behind a funny car at 192 miles per hour, and Freddy "Boom Boom" Cannon blowing himself up.

In the 1980s, the speedway began to cater to local drivers, and featured "Test and Tune" and "Run What You Brung" nights, where for a small fee, any driver could bring a car to the track and race it alone or against others.

=== Demise ===
The last race at the speedway took place on December 13, 1992, due to the western expansion of new homes and complaints from neighbors. A part of the subdivision of Pembroke Isles now occupies the site of the drag strip, which ran from the south by west to the north by east and roughly aligned with the current NW 167th Avenue. The subdivision's wetland buffer site bordering Pines Boulevard just east of a fire station now occupies the site of the oval track. The area north of the dragstrip was the resting point of numerous race cars that went off the end of the track, to the chagrin of many racers, and the delight of many a grandstand dweller.

== Miami Rock Festival ==
Miami Rock Festival
- Genre: Rock music, etc.
- Dates: Dec. 27-29, 1969
- Location: Miami-Hollywood Motorsports Park

The speedway was also the site of the three-day Miami Rock Festival on Dec. 27–29, 1969. The lineup included acts such as Santana, Motherlode, Sweetwater, Canned Heat, Johnny Winter, The Amboy Dukes, and the Paul Butterfield Blues Band. Police searched fans, making 47 arrests, and a young audience member died after falling from a spotlight tower. Grateful Dead also performed. Not to be confused with an annual pub event held since the 2000s.

== See also ==
- List of historic rock festivals
