= Passenger (Grateful Dead song) =

- 2020 single reissue

Single by Grateful Dead

from the album Terrapin Station
- B-side: "Terrapin Station"
- Released: November 1977
- Length: 2:48
- Label: Arista
- Composer: Phil Lesh
- Lyricist: Peter Zimels (Peter Monk)
- Producer: Keith Olsen

Grateful Dead singles chronology
"Dancing in the Street" (1977)	"Passenger" (1977)	"Good Lovin'" (1978)

"Passenger" is a song by the American rock band Grateful Dead, released as the third track on their ninth studio album Terrapin Station (1977).

== Overview ==
The music for "Passenger" was composed by Phil Lesh and the lyrics were written by Peter Zimels, credited as Peter Monk on the album, a monk, as well as associate of the band who later conducted Jerry Garcia and Mountain Girl's wedding. The track itself has been seen as a departure from the rest of Terrapin Station, instead donning a more funk arrangement rather than the more prog rock style of the rest of the album. Lesh said of the song in an issue of Dupree's Diamond News that "I sort of did it as a joke. It's a take on a Fleetwood Mac tune called "Station Man", I just sort of sped it up and put some different chord changes in there." "Passenger" was first performed on May 5, 1977 at the St. Louis Arena in St. Louis, Missouri. It was issued as a single backed by "Terrapin Station". Lesh himself later admitted that the only reason he created the track was because "I wanted the guitar players to play with a little raunch."

== Release and reception ==
"Passenger" was issued as the third track on Terrapin Station. In a review for the single for Record World, its writers state that "The voices of Bob Weir and Donna Godchaux stand out on this energetic, country-tinged rocker", believing that it could be a hit single. In a retrospective review of Terrapin Station for Paste magazine, Matt Mitchell said that "Lesh’s undercooked, raw-hemmed blues-rock scorcher, makes for a necessary, middle-bloc freakout on a grab-bag record like Terrapin Station. The layering of Donna’s vocals, which overpower Weir’s, mirror those of a backing choir and crimson in the depths of Garcia’s escalating lead guitar chain." Live versions of the track have appeared on the following live releases:

- Dead Set (1981)
- Dick's Picks Volume 18 (2000)
- Dick's Picks Volume 29 (2003)
- Road Trips Volume 1 Number 1 (2007)
- Road Trips Volume 1 Number 4 (2008)

== Personnel ==
According to Grateful Dead Family Discography:

- Bob Weir – guitar, vocals
- Phil Lesh – bass, vocals
- Jerry Garcia – guitar, vocals
- Donna Jean Godchaux – vocals
- Keith Godchaux – keyboards
- Bill Kreutzmann – drums
- Mickey Hart – drums
