= Portrait of Elisabeth Bas =

Painting by Ferdinand Bol

Portrait of an Old Lady, Possibly Elisabeth Bas
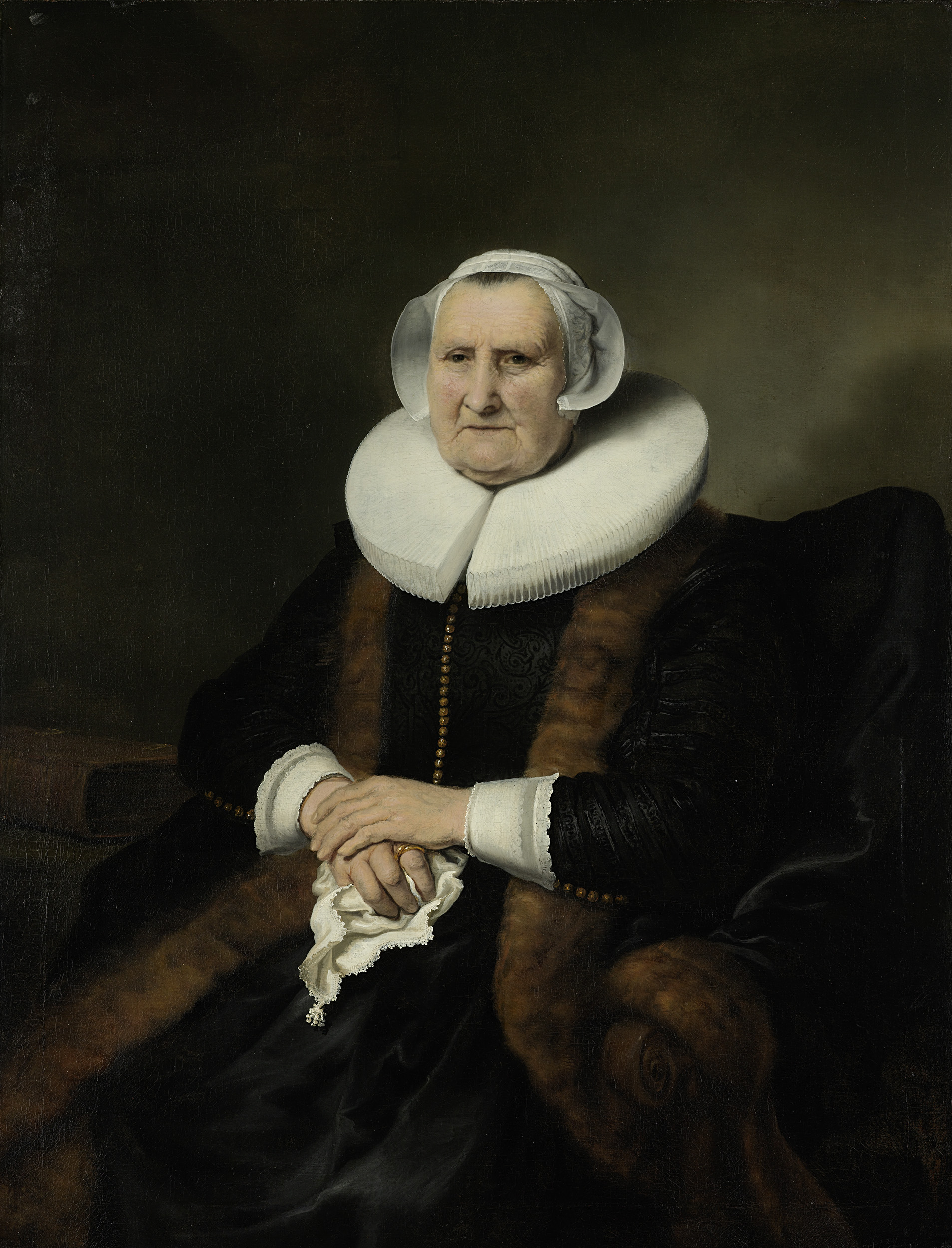
- Artist: Ferdinand Bol
- Year: 1640s
- Medium: canvas, oil paint
- Dimensions: 118 cm (46 in) × 91.5 cm (36.0 in)
- Location: Rijksmuseum, Netherlands
- Owner: Jacobus Salomon Hendrik van de Poll
- Accession no.: SK-A-714
- Identifiers: RKDimages ID: 1882

Portrait of Elisabeth Bas is a portrait by Ferdinand Bol of the Dutch businesswoman Elisabeth Bas, commissioned by her granddaughter Maria Rey, from the 1640s. It is in the collection of the Rijksmuseum Amsterdam, where it is known as Elisabeth Bas and attributed to Golden age of Dutch art painter Ferdinand Bol (1616 - 1680), though the identity of the sitter is held in doubt by the Rijksmuseum.

== History and attribution ==
Until 1911 it was thought to be by Rembrandt, but that year the Rembrandt expert Abraham Bredius re-attributed it to Ferdinand Bol. At the time, the re-attribution was strongly disputed by the collector and art historian Cornelis Hofstede de Groot (1836-1930), but it is now acknowledged as accurate.

A brand of cigars was named after this painting in the 20th century, produced at a factory at Boxtel and using the painting as a logo, and their bands and the boxes for cigars of this brand are still collector's items.
