= Jochem Swartenhont =

Dutch naval officer

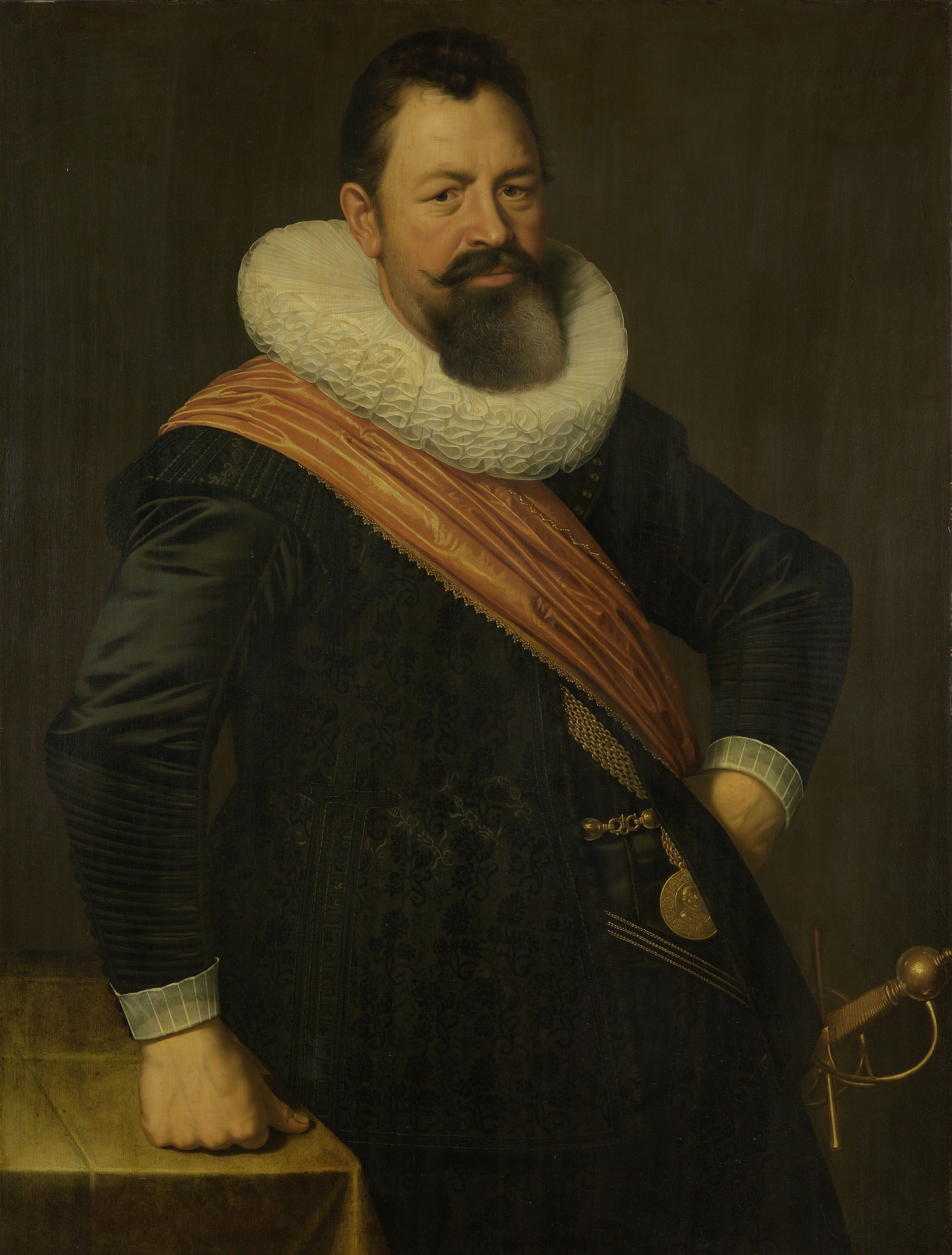
Jochem Swartenhont (1566-1627) (Nicolaes Pickenoy, 1627)

Jochem Hendrickszoon Swartenhont (1566 – 5 June 1627), also spelt as Joachim, was a Dutch naval officer in the navy of the Dutch Republic in the 17th century.

Swartenhondt was born in Amsterdam, and started his career with the merchant fleet, becoming a cabin boy at age eleven. He attained the rank of first mate. Later he joined the army to fight against the Dunkirkers, but in 1587 he was captured and forced to serve on the Habsburg galleys in Flanders; he managed to escape however and brought with him important intelligence about the Spanish Armada of 1588.

In 1596 he became a lieutenant with the Amsterdam admiralty; in 1597 a captain.

In 1599 he distinguished himself while serving as captain of a ship in a fleet under Vice-Admiral Pieter van der Does during an expedition to Gran Canaria. In 1602 he became a Vice-Admiral with the Amsterdam Admiralty, and served under Admiral Jacob van Wassenaer-Duivenvoorde on an expedition to the Spanish coast. From 1603 to 1605 he served as a temporary Vice-Admiral under Paulus van Caerden during an expedition to the West Indies and Brazil.

In 1605 he ended his service, becoming an inn-keeper, but in 1608 again was readmitted as a temporary Vice-Admiral. At the start of the Twelve Years' Truce in 1609 he again retired from service.

From 1609 to 1620 he and his wife, Elisabeth Jacobs Bas (1571-1649), would keep the Prins van Oranje ("Prince of Orange") tavern in Amsterdam, a popular watering hole of many politicians, artists, and writers. After Jochem's death his widow Elisabeth Bas sold it, becoming rich (she left 28,000 guilders on her death).

In 1620, when the truce was about to end, at his own request Jochem returned to the fleet as a Vice-Admiral; in 1621 he became Lieutenant-Admiral of Holland and West-Friesland, and he commanded a large convoy to the Mediterranean and successfully defended it against an attack by a Spanish squadron. In 1622 he acted as temporary Lieutenant-Admiral; after that year he left the naval service for good.

== Depictions ==
He was painted, wearing his military decorations, by Nicolaes Pickenoy (1588–1655), who also painted Jochem's daughter Maria.

Ferdinand Bol made a well-known painting of his wife Elisabeth in 1640, many years after Jochem's death.
