= Portrait of a Man (Bol) =

Painting by Ferdinand Bol

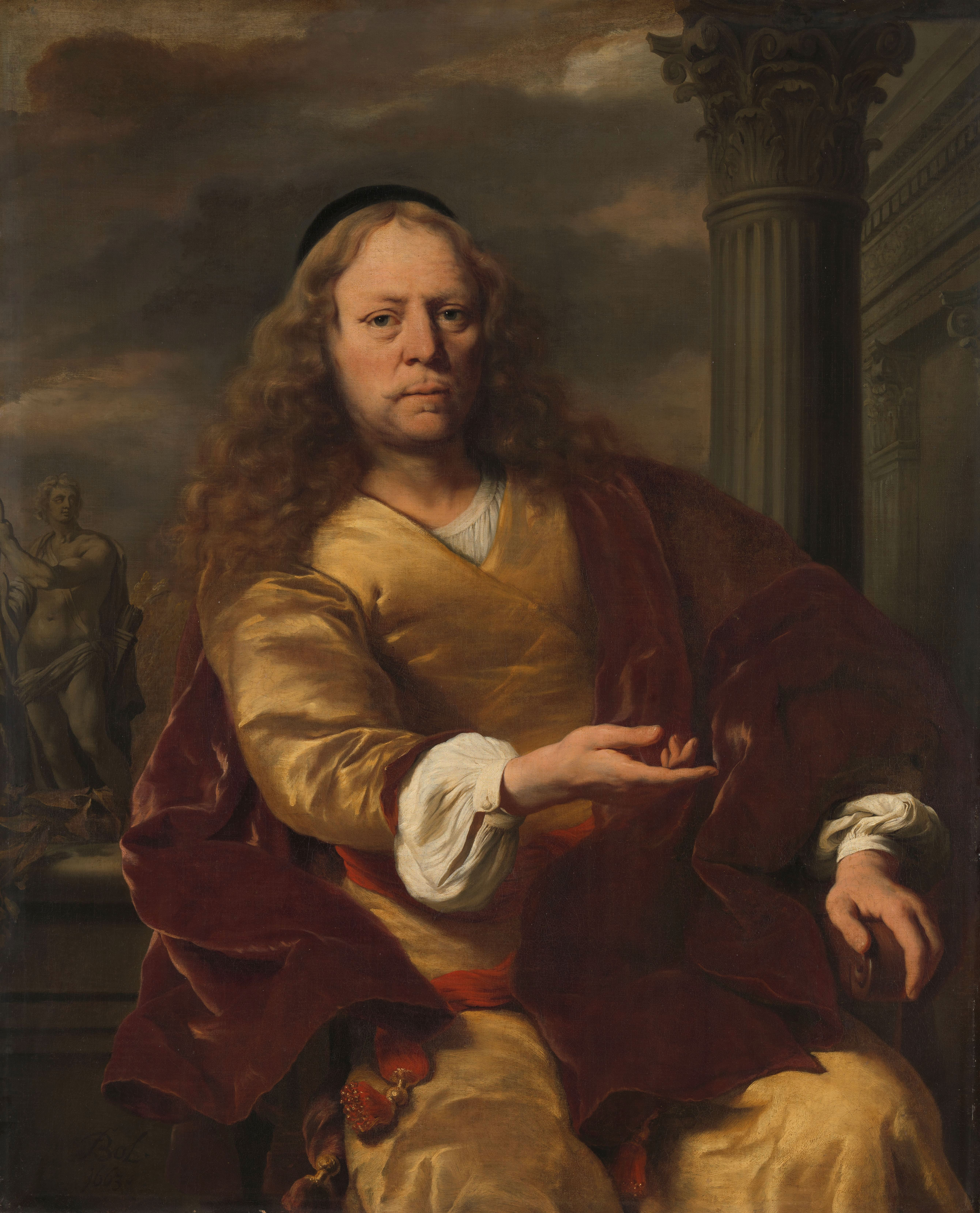
- Artist: Ferdinand Bol
- Year: 1663
- Medium: Oil on canvas
- Dimensions: 124 cm × 100 cm (49 in × 39 in)
- Location: Rijksmuseum, Amsterdam

Portrait of a Man is an oil-on-canvas painting by the Dutch artist Ferdinand Bol, from 1663. It is held in the Rijksmuseum in Amsterdam.

== Description ==
It shows a man with long blonde hair in a banyan against a background of architectural columns and a statue of Apollo. Its subject is unknown but may be Jacob van Campen, one of the most important proponents of Dutch classicism, Artus Quellinus, a sculptor who produced works for the stadhuis op de Dam and other buildings designed by Van Campen, or Louis Trip, who with his brother Hendrick designed the Trippenhuis, for which Bol painted a number of paintings.

== Frame ==
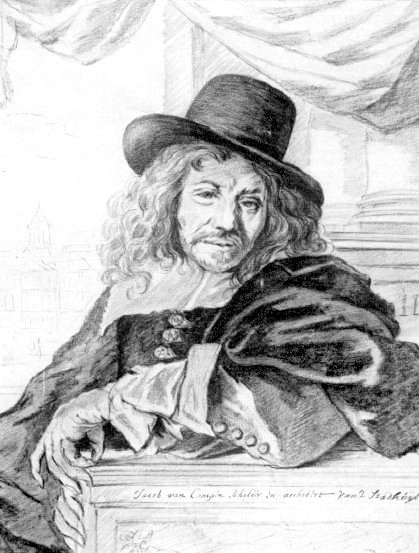
Portrait of Jacob van Campen

In 1984, the Rijksmuseum organized the exhibition Praise the frame, which examined the form and function of painting frames in the 17th century. This showed that a large number of paintings in the Rijksmuseum contained a frame that did not belong to the original work. This was also the case with Bol's Portrait of a Man, which had a 17th-century Italian frame. To better present the work, it was decided to commission sculptor and restorer Maarten Robert to make a replica of a frame from the Dutch Golden Age.

The frame of the portrait of Johan de Witt by Jan de Baen, in the Dordrechts Museum, from the late 1660s, was used as a model. This frame consists of a pattern of intersecting olive branches with a recess at the top center for a family coat of arms. The replica was completed around 1995, after which the work was exhibited in the museum's gallery of honour, for about 10 years, until it went on tour in 2005 during the renovation of the Rijksmuseum.

== Bibliography ==
- Anoniem (1830) Aanwijzing der schilderijen, berustende op ’s Rijks Museum, te Amsterdam, [s.l.: s.n.], p. 11, cat.nr. 36 (als ‘Het portret van Jacob van Campen, bouwheer van het stadhuis, tegenwoordig het koninklijk paleis te Amsterdam’). Zie Google Boeken.
- Anoniem (1839) Aanwijzing der schilderijen, berustende op ’s Rijks Museum te Amsterdam, [s.l.: s, n,], p. 9, cat.nr. 36, als ‘Portret van Jacob van Kampen, bouwheer van het stadhuis (tegenwoordig het Koninklijk paleis) te Amsterdam’). Zie Google Boeken.
- Anoniem (1903) Catalogus der Schilderijen miniaturen, pastels, omlijste teekeningen, enz. in het Rijks-Museum te Amsterdam, Amsterdam: Boek- en kunstdrukkerij v/h Roeloffzen-Hübner en Van Santen, p. 54, cat.nr. 545 (als Artus Quellinus). Zie archive.org.
- anoniem (1934) Catalogus der schilderijen pastels–miniaturen–aquarellen tentoongesteld in het Rijksmuseum te Amsterdam, Amsterdam: J.H. de Bussy, p. 52, cat.nr. 545 (also Artus Quellinus). Zie delpher.nl.

== Exhibition history ==
- De gouden eeuw der grote steden, Sint-Pietersabdij, Gent, 14 June-14 September 1958.
- The Golden Age. Highlights from the Rijksmuseum, National Gallery of Victoria, Melbourne, 24 June-2 October 2005, Hyogo Prefectural Museum of Art, Kobe, 25 October 2005 – 15 January 2006.
- Rembrandt and the Golden Age. Highlights from the Rijksmuseum, Amsterdam, Shanghai Museum, Shanghai, 2 November 2007 – 13 February 2008, cat.nr. 54.
- Vermeer, Rembrandt and the Golden Age of Dutch painting. Masterpieces from the Rijksmuseum, Vancouver Art Gallery, Vancouver, 9 May-13 September 2009, ISBN 978-1-55365-471-1.
- L'âge d'or hollandais. De Rembrandt à Vermeer, Pinacothèque de Paris, Paris, 7 October 2009 – 7 February 2010, ISBN 9782358670050, p. 226-227, cat.nr. 91.
