= Self-Portrait (Bol) =

Painting by Ferdinand Bol

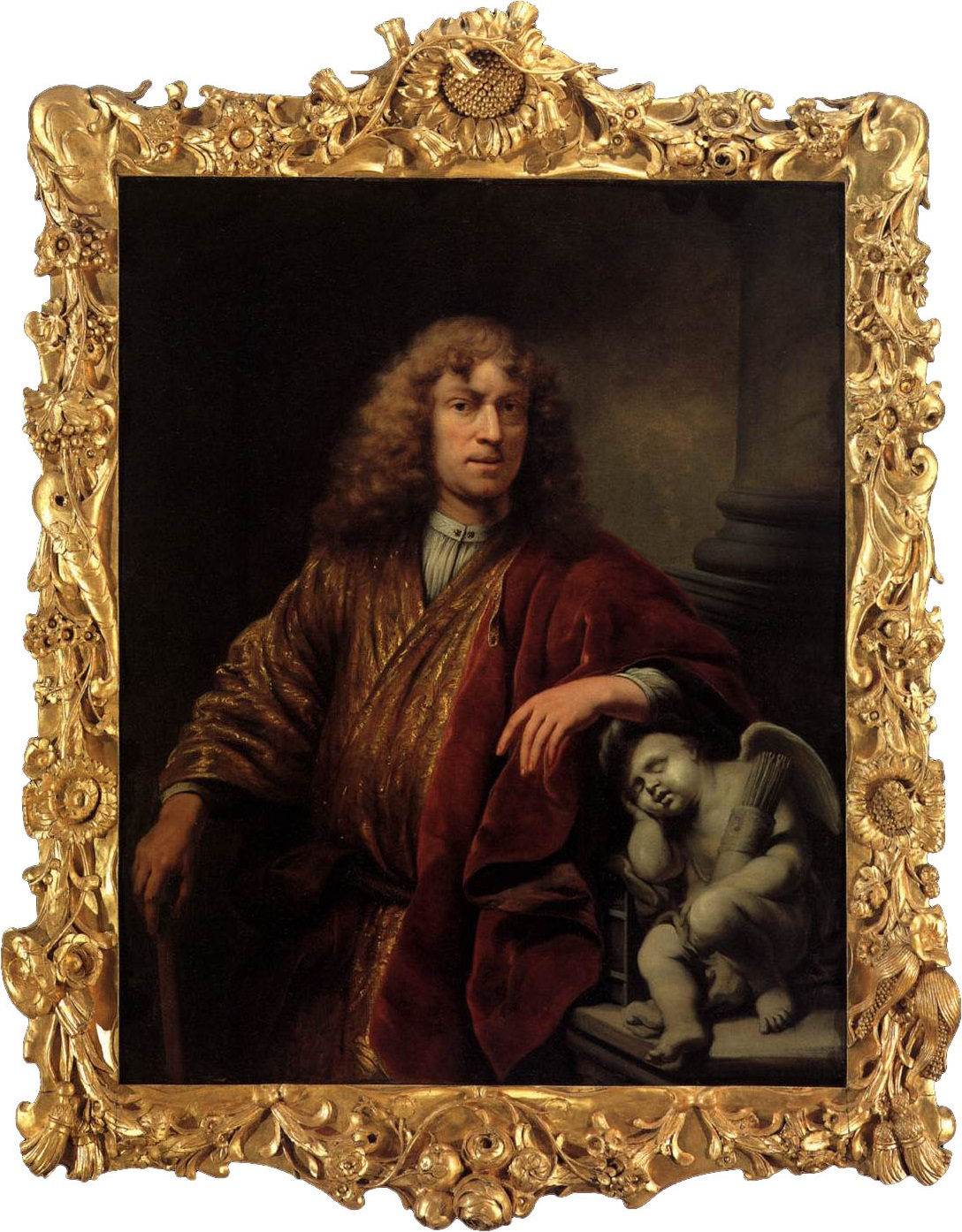
- Artist: Ferdinand Bol
- Year: c. 1669
- Medium: Oil on canvas
- Dimensions: 127 cm × 102 cm (50 in × 40 in)
- Location: Rijksmuseum; Amsterdam

Self-Portrait is an oil-on-canvas painting executed c. 1669 by the Dutch painter Ferdinand Bol. It is held in the Rijksmuseum in Amsterdam. Showing the artist in an embroidered robe leaning on a small sculpture of Cupid, it is thought to have been painted on the occasion of his second marriage to Anna van Erckel in 1669.

It is probably the self-portrait mentioned in the probate records relating to the artist's unmarried son Elbert, though it is unknown to whom it was bequeathed. It was sold as lot number 9 at a Weduwe C. Roos auction of the collection owned by a man named Wreesman on 17 August 1818. It was bought by Albertus Brondgeest, who left it to its current owner in 1849.

== Exhibition history ==
- Historische Tentoonstelling van Amsterdam, gehouden in den Zomer van 1876, Oudemannenhuis, Amsterdam, 1876.
- Prijst de lijst. De Hollandse schilderkunst in de zeventiende eeuw, Rijksmuseum, Amsterdam, 6 April - 1 July 1984, cat.nr. 61, p. 2, 24, 234, 244, 266.
- Portretten van echt en trouw, Frans Halsmuseum, Haarlem, 15 February - 13 April 1986, cat.nr. 9, p. 87.
- De glorie van de Gouden Eeuw. Nederlandse kunst uit de 17de eeuw. Schilderijen, beeldhouwkunst en kunstnijverheid, Rijksmuseum, Amsterdam, 15 April - 17 September 2000, ISBN 90-400-9433-0, cat.nr. 74, p. 119.
