= An Astronomer =

Painting by Ferdinand Bol

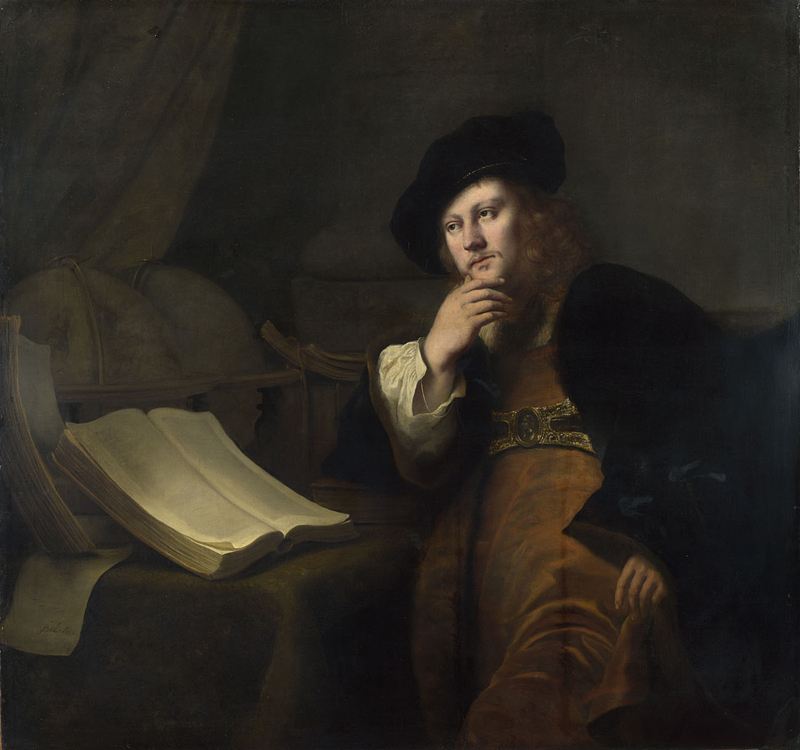
- Artist: Ferdinand Bol
- Year: 1652
- Medium: Oil on canvas
- Dimensions: 127 cm × 135 cm (50 in × 53 in)
- Location: National Gallery; London

An Astronomer is an oil-on-canvas painting created in 1652 by Dutch artist Ferdinand Bol. He served as an apprentice to Rembrandt and earlier to Jacob Cuyp. The painting is held in the National Gallery, in London, to which it was donated by E.A. Bennett in 1862.

== Description ==
The painting shows an astronomer at a table, on which are terrestrial and celestial globes. The work also draws on the themes of Melencolia I, an engraving by Albrecht Dürer.

The depicted man, who is peering into an open book with a frowning expression, can easily be identified as an astronomer due to the presence of a world map and a celestial sphere on the table. The painting perhaps belongs to the trend dating back to Dürer, in which scientists were depicted in the melancholy generated by the awareness of the futility of their research in face of the prospect of death.
