= Elisabeth Bas =

Dutch businesswoman and pub-owner

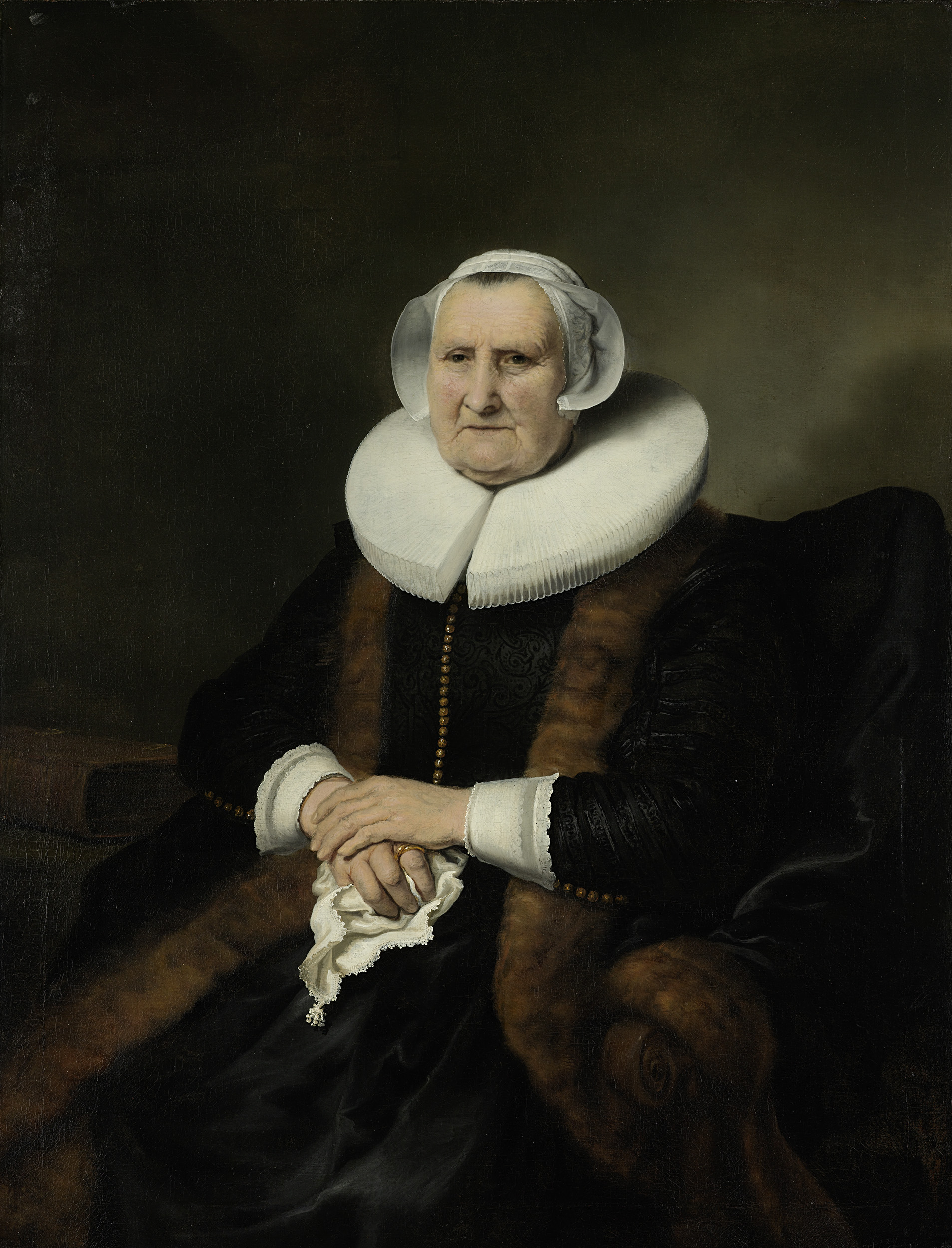
Portrait of Elisabeth Bas, by Ferdinand Bol

Elisabeth Bas (c. 1571, in Kampen – 2 August 1649, in Amsterdam) was a Dutch businesswoman during the Republican era. She was the wife of Jochem Swartenhont.

== Biography ==
Bas' husband Swartenhont was an admiral in the navy of the Dutch Republic and a military hero. Jochem Swartenhont was painted, wearing his military decorations by Nicolaes Eliasz. Pickenoy (1588-1655) - Pickenoy also painted Joachem's daughter, Maria. During his frequent absence, Elisabeth, as was the custom for the wives of sailors, supported herself with small time business such as selling bread. During the Twelve Years' Truce (1609-1621), Jochem was out of work and set up a tavern in Amsterdam named after the Prince of Orange. It was on the corner of the Nes and the Pieter Jacobszstraat and was patronised by politicians, artists, and writers. After Jochem's death, Elisabeth continued to manage it until at least 1631. She later sold it, becoming rich (she left 28,000 guilders to her heirs on her death).

Jochem died in 1627, leaving his wife and four children. Three of these children died before their mother. The eldest daughter, Maria, had had three children, who were adopted by Elisabeth upon Maria's death - one of them, Maria Rey, later commissioned a portrait of Elisabeth from Dutch painter Ferdinand Bol.
