= Dick's Picks Volume 3 =

Live album by Grateful Dead
- Released: November 7, 1995
- Recorded: May 22, 1977
- Venue: Hollywood Sportatorium (Pembroke Pines, Florida)
- Genres: Jam, rock and roll
- Length: 137:52
- Label: Grateful Dead
- Producer: Grateful Dead

Grateful Dead chronology
Hundred Year Hall (1995)	Dick's Picks Volume 3 (1995)	Dick's Picks Volume 4 (1996)

Professional ratings
Review scores
Source	Rating
Allmusic	4/5 stars
The Music Box	4.5/5 stars
Rolling Stone	3/5 stars
Entertainment Weekly	B+

Dick's Picks Volume 3 is the third live album in the Dick's Picks series by the Grateful Dead. It was recorded on May 22, 1977, at the Sportatorium in Pembroke Pines, Florida. It was released in November 1995 on Grateful Dead Records.

Dick's Picks Volume 3 was again released, by Grateful Dead Productions, in November 2005 as a digital download.

The track "Sugaree" was also used on the promotional sampler A Glimpse of the Vault, released in 1996.

== Caveat emptor ==
Each volume of Dick's Picks has its own "caveat emptor" label, advising the listener of the sound quality of the recording. The label for Volume 3 reads:

"This show was originally recorded on analog tape manufactured in the late 1970s. Many tapes from this period have exhibited severe deterioration in recent years. The chemical formulation has failed over time, causing the magnetic oxide (which holds the musical information) to separate from the mylar backing. Fortunately we were able to recover the music on these tapes by using a baking process which rebonded the oxide to the tape. While the results of this restoration were quite remarkable, occasional weirdness remains."

== Set list ==
The complete concert set list for the 5/22/77 show at Pembroke Pines, Florida, was:

1: "Funiculì, Funiculà" tuning*, "The Music Never Stopped"*, "Sugaree"*, "El Paso", "Peggy-O", "New Minglewood Blues", "Friend of the Devil", "Lazy Lightning"* → "Supplication"*, "Ramble On Rose", "Dancing in the Street"*

2: "Help on the Way"* → "Slipknot!"* → "Franklin's Tower"*, "Samson and Delilah"*, "Brown Eyed Women", "Good Lovin' ", "Sunrise"*, "Estimated Prophet"* → "Eyes of the World"* → "Wharf Rat"* → "Terrapin Station"* → "Morning Dew"*

E: "Sugar Magnolia" → "Sunshine Daydream"

* appears on Dick's Picks Volume 3

== Track listing ==
Disc one

First set:

1. "Funiculì, Funiculà" (Luigi Denza) – 0:28
2. "The Music Never Stopped" (John Perry Barlow, Bob Weir) – 6:45
3. "Sugaree" (Jerry Garcia, Robert Hunter) – 15:54
4. "Lazy Lightning" (Barlow, Weir) – 3:22 →
5. "Supplication" (Barlow, Weir) – 5:34
6. "Dancing in the Street" (Marvin Gaye, Ivy Jo Hunter, William "Mickey" Stevenson) – 14:28

Second set:

7. "Help on the Way" (Garcia, Hunter) – 5:23 →
8. "Slipknot!" (Grateful Dead) – 6:29 →
9. "Franklin's Tower" (Garcia, Hunter, Bill Kreutzmann) – 15:32

Disc two

Second set, continued:

1. "Samson and Delilah" (traditional) – 7:31
2. "Sunrise" (Donna Godchaux) – 4:15
3. "Estimated Prophet" (Barlow, Weir) – 9:00 →
4. "Eyes of the World" (Garcia, Hunter) – 13:38 →
5. "Wharf Rat" (Garcia, Hunter) – 9:14 →
6. "Terrapin Station" (Garcia, Hunter) – 5:58 →
7. "(Walk Me Out in the) Morning Dew" (Bonnie Dobson, Tim Rose) – 14:21

== Personnel ==
=== Grateful Dead ===
- Jerry Garcia – lead guitar, vocals
- Donna Jean Godchaux – vocals
- Keith Godchaux – keyboards
- Mickey Hart – drums
- Bill Kreutzmann – drums
- Phil Lesh – bass
- Bob Weir – guitar, vocals

=== Production ===
- Betty Cantor-Jackson – recording
- Dick Latvala – tape archivist
- Jeffrey Norman – CD mastering
- Ed Perlstein – photography
- Gecko Graphics – design

== See also ==
- Dick's Picks Volume 29 - Features recordings from the same stretch of shows, on the nights of May 19 and 21, 1977.
