= Hollywood Sportatorium =

Arena in Pembroke Pines, Florida, U.S.

- The Sporto
- View of the Hollywood Sportatorium looking west. Pines Boulevard is out of view to the left.
- Interactive map of Hollywood Sportatorium
- Location: 17171 Pines Boulevard (State Road 820), Pembroke Pines, Florida 33028
- Coordinates: 26°0′32.47″N 80°22′30.79″W
- Owner: Stephen A. Calder
- Capacity: 15,532

Construction
- Built: September 1968
- Opened: December 1969
- Renovated: 1975
- Closed: October 21, 1988
- Demolished: September–October 1993

Tenant
- Fort Lauderdale Strikers (NASL) (1980–81)

The Hollywood Sportatorium was an indoor arena in Pembroke Pines, Florida (originally Hollywood), located at 17171 Pines Boulevard (originally 16661 West Hollywood Boulevard). The Sportatorium was 26 miles (42 km) from downtown Miami and 23 miles (37 km) from downtown Fort Lauderdale. During its 18 years of operation, it was the only venue of its kind in heavily populated South Florida.

== History ==
The Sportatorium was built beginning in September 1968 by Stephen Calder and Norman Johnson. Calder would also build the Calder Race Course shortly thereafter. It stood adjacent to the Miami-Hollywood Motorsports Park, which Calder and Johnson had constructed four years earlier. Among the plans for the Sportatorium were sports events, ice follies programs, auto and boat shows, and eventually a "Gold Coast State Fair". The Sportatorium was constructed as a hangar-like facility constructed out of concrete, a steel roof, an asphalt floor, and no air conditioning. Originally designed to seat 18,000 for stage events and 15,000 for arena events, it opened in December 1969 with only 6,000 seats.

"The idea was to have a facility which could have entertainment and events out of weather," said Bruce Johnson, Norman Johnson's son, who managed the arena until 1980. At first, it hosted indoor rodeos, indoor motocross events, wrestling, boxing, and some concerts. At the time, what is now the six- to eight-lane Pines Boulevard was a two-lane road in a thinly populated area of unincorporated Broward County.

While the seating capacity did eventually increase, by 1974, the Sportatorium still lacked permanent seating, air conditioning, an enclosed roof, and good traffic access. The land on which the arena stood was annexed to Pembroke Pines in 1980.

=== Home of the phantom sports franchise ===
The Sportatorium was often floated as the home of a professional basketball or hockey franchise. As originally built, however, it did not have permanent seating or air conditioning. Additionally, the arena was only accessible from the then two-lane Hollywood Boulevard, resulting in massive traffic jams whenever events there attracted decent-sized crowds. Consequently, for a time there was little serious interest in the Sportatorium for a sports franchise. Even so, as early as 1969, there were inquiries to the Eastern Hockey League and the National Hockey League about the possibility of landing a hockey franchise.

In 1972, the World Hockey Association awarded a franchise to South Florida called the Miami Screaming Eagles. Herb Martin, the owner, had been rebuffed in his efforts to build his own arena in Miami and considered playing at the Sportatorium instead. However, he ultimately concluded that the arena was unsuitable even as a temporary facility and sold the franchise before playing a single game.

Two years later, Calder twice put off an announcement that he would acquire an expansion franchise from the WHA. Miami builder Robert Blum also hoped to get a WHA franchise, but wanted the team to play at the Miami Beach Convention Center (which had fewer than 3,000 seats). Concerning Calder's Sportatorium, Blum said: "I don't even know why they built it. It is a Tinker Toy arena. It's dumb, it's not even good for rock concerts. If they could get good crowds, they couldn't handle them, so even if they succeeded it would be self-defeating."

Calder renovated the arena in 1975 in large part to help bring a professional basketball or hockey team to the arena. Four million dollars were spent renovating the arena and installing air conditioning, new and expanded seating upstairs, and pipes under the floor to make ice. After the renovation, the arena had a seating capacity of 15,532 seats. However, while four different teams were set to move into the Sportatorium in the first year following the renovations, none of them actually did:

- The first attempt to import a team in 1976 was in February, when former Philadelphia Flyers part-owner Bill Putnam attempted to bring the WHA's Minnesota Fighting Saints to the Sportatorium; however, the league's board of trustees voted to suspend the franchise rather than award it to the Florida group headed by Putnam.
- The second attempt was in June 1976, when Diplomat Hotel owner Irving Cowan obtained an option to purchase the Buffalo Braves of the NBA for $6.1 million, and planned to bring them to South Florida and the Sportatorium. Pledges of more than 8,000 season tickets were received. However, the city of Buffalo sued the Braves for breach of contract and sought a restraining order preventing the move. Although Cowan claimed the move would still take place, the effort nonetheless failed due to the lawsuit. The Braves signed a new, conditional lease with the city of Buffalo, and ended up moving to San Diego two years later, where they became the San Diego (now Los Angeles) Clippers.
- The third attempt came just a month later, when Putnam managed to conclude a deal to purchase another WHA club, the Cleveland Crusaders, with the first game scheduled for October 15 at the Sportatorium. The deal failed, however, and the Crusaders ended up moving to Saint Paul to become the second incarnation of the Minnesota Fighting Saints (not to be confused with the original Fighting Saints team that Putnam tried to buy five months earlier). Having already accepted deposits for season tickets, Putnam immediately sought to bring the San Diego Mariners to town, to become the Florida Breakers in time for the 1976–77 season. However, this deal failed as well, and ticket depositors who tried to get their money back found the Breakers' Hollywood Boulevard office closed and the phone disconnected. Putnam eventually filed for bankruptcy. (Had the move taken place, it would have been the franchise's fifth identity in four years, having previously played as the New York Raiders, New York Golden Blades and Jersey Knights before shifting to San Diego.)
- The fourth and final attempt was at the end of the WHA's 1976–77 season. Miami resident Jerry Saperstein, son of Harlem Globetrotters founder Abe Saperstein, agreed to purchase the same San Diego Mariners club that Bill Putnam tried to buy from owner Ray Kroc; pending approval from the WHA board of trustees, the renamed Florida Icegators would've come to the Sportatorium in time for 1977–78 season, . (As noted above, the move would have marked a return to the east coast for the Mariners franchise, originally the New York Golden Blades.) However, the WHA sought to merge with the National Hockey League that year, and the Mariners were not among the four WHA clubs that ultimately joined the older league in 1979.

While the arena never did attract a truly permanent sports franchise, the Fort Lauderdale Strikers of the North American Soccer League played at the Sportatorium for one NASL indoor season in 1980–81. (The season was a disaster for the Strikers, with a 1–17 record and drawing only 1,590 fans per game, worst in the league.) In addition, the Sportatorium did host one preseason NBA matchup when the New Orleans Jazz defeated the Atlanta Hawks, 113–104, in front of 6,068 fans on October 7, 1977.

=== The Rock Mecca of South Florida ===
Despite the Sportatorium's lack of success in attracting a sports franchise, it thrived as a concert arena. The largest concert venue at the time was a small outdoor amphitheater at Pirates World in Dania. Outdoor concerts were also held at Miami Stadium. But the biggest concern with those outdoor facilities was the frequent showers that would often washout concerts. The Sportatorium had a roof, and much more available seating. Although there were various problems with the facility, it quickly became the focal point for the big-name rock music scene in the 1970s and 1980s. Virtually every well-known rock band touring during that period performed on the stage of the Sporto.

In 1971, the Sportatorium began a summer series of weekly rock concerts every Sunday at 2:00 p.m. The first truly big-name rock act to play the Sportatorium was Emerson, Lake & Palmer, on August 10, 1971. Less than a month later, on September 1, 1971, Led Zeppelin stopped at the Sportatorium on its North American tour. The remainder of 1971 saw MC5 and Alice Cooper on September 12, Grand Funk Railroad on October 15, and Fleetwood Mac on November 6. In December, the Sportatorium saw appearances by Spirit, The Amboy Dukes, Teagarden & Van Winkle, Bob Seger, Crabby Appleton, The James Gang (Joe Walsh of The Eagles) and Rain.

Deep Purple, with Uriah Heep as the opening act, performed the first concert of 1972 at the Sportatorium on January 13. The Allman Brothers Band played at the arena on January 22, just three months following the death of Duane Allman. Uriah Heep returned as a headliner in February, with Cactus as the opening act. In April, The Byrds, The Moody Blues, and Pink Floyd played concerts at the Sporto. On April 21 Creedence Clearwater Revival, with opening acts Freddie King and Tony Joe White, performed for the last time in Florida before the breakup of CCR. Following yet another visit mid-summer by Uriah Heep, Yes performed in September with the Eagles as the opening act. Beck, Bogert & Appice, Poco, and John Mayall played in October, and the year closed out in December with a visit from Humble Pie and return visits from the Allman Brothers Band and Fleetwood Mac.

1973 saw concerts from John Martyn, Uriah Heep with Spooky Tooth, Frank Zappa with Foghat, Pink Floyd, Focus, Elton John, Emerson, Lake & Palmer and Chicago with Gentle Giant opening for them. On February 17 Free played their final show at the venue before breaking up for good.

In 1974, there were concerts from Johnny Winter with Brownsville Station, Bob Dylan & The Band, New Riders of the Purple Sage with Commander Cody and His Lost Planet Airmen, The Beach Boys, King Crimson with Poco, The Guess Who, and Uriah Heep with Babe Ruth and Manfred Mann's Earth Band.

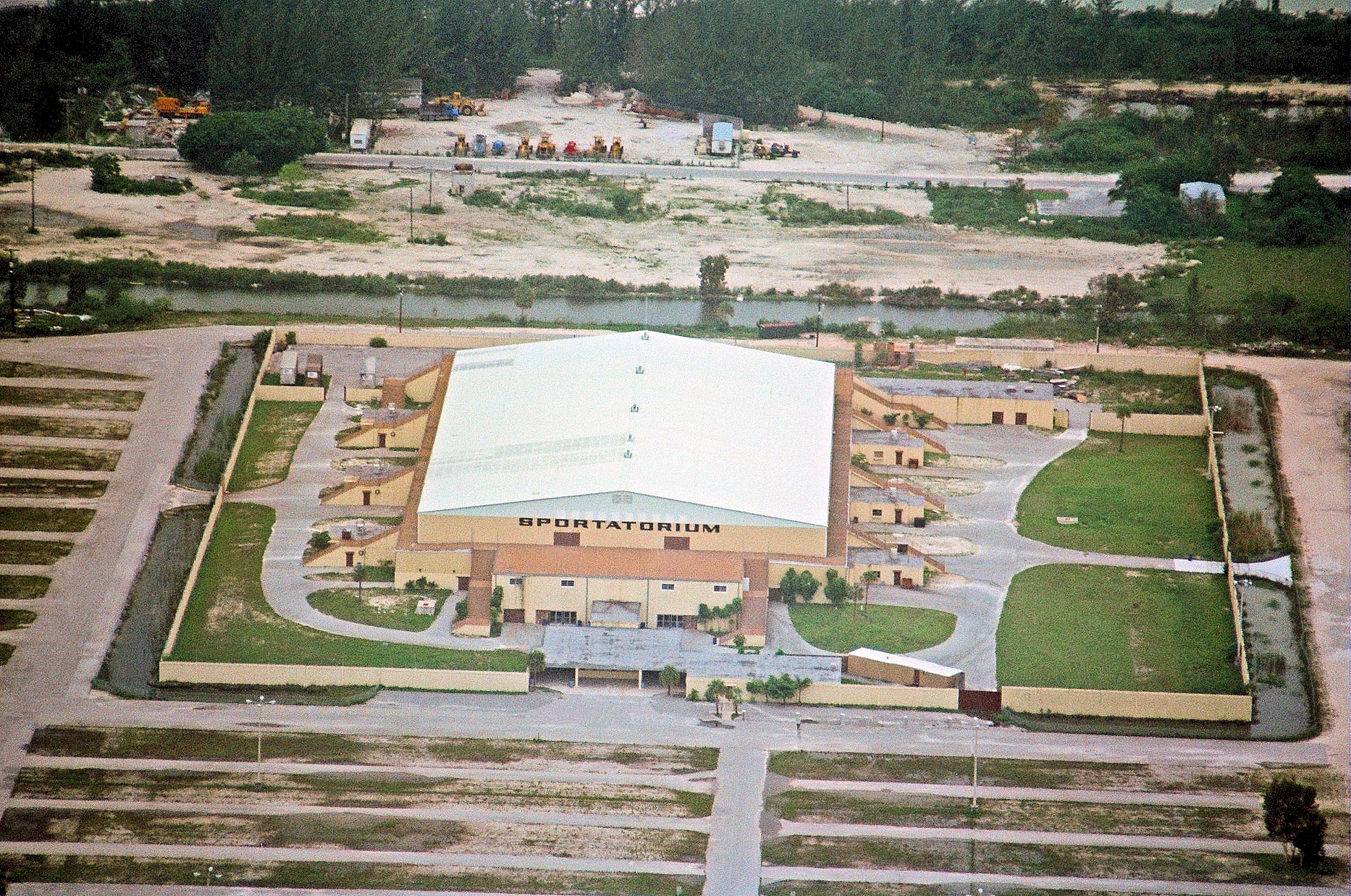
Aerial view of the Sportatorium looking west in the 1980s

The Doobie Brothers, with the Ozark Mountain Daredevils and Lynyrd Skynyrd as the opening acts, and Baker Gurvitz Army played the Sportatorium in 1975, shortly before renovations began on the arena.

Following the 1975–1976 renovation, the Eagles performed in July 1976, followed by ZZ Top and Chicago in October, Eric Clapton in November and Kiss in December. 1977 opened with a January concert by The Beach Boys, followed by a notable February 12 concert by Elvis Presley on what would turn out to be one of his last tours before his death that August. Queen and Thin Lizzy played the Sportatorium a week after Elvis, with Blue Öyster Cult following in March. A concert by Jethro Tull took place in April, and the Grateful Dead played in May. Concerts by Bad Company, AC/DC, and Johnny Winter took place during the summer, followed by a Patti Smith concert in September. On October 15, 1977, Lynyrd Skynyrd played one of its last concerts at the Sportatorium; five days later, three members of the group were killed in a plane crash. The remainder of 1977 saw concerts from Santana, The Doobie Brothers with Pablo Cruise, Kansas, Rush, Rod Stewart, and Robin Trower.

In 1978, there were concerts from Kiss, Rush with Pat Travers and Head East, John Denver, the Grateful Dead, Journey and Van Halen with Montrose, Blue Öyster Cult, The Isley Brothers, Aerosmith with Mahogany Rush, Foghat, Sweet, Genesis, Queen, Black Sabbath, Van Halen, Bob Dylan, and Ambrosia.

1979 saw visits to the Sporto from Boston, Styx, Rush with UFO, The Moody Blues, Kiss, Yes, Mick Ronson with Blue Öyster Cult, Jethro Tull, and Kansas.

In the 1980s, the arena was the site of concerts for AC/DC, Beastie Boys, Billy Idol, Billy Joel, Billy Squier, Blue Öyster Cult, Bob Seger, Bon Jovi, Boston, Bruce Springsteen, Bryan Adams, The Cars, Cheap Trick, Cinderella, Crosby, Stills, and Nash, Deep Purple, Def Leppard, Dio, Dokken, Duran Duran, Electric Light Orchestra, Foghat, The Firm, Foreigner, Grateful Dead, Guns N' Roses, Heart, Huey Lewis and the News, INXS, Iron Maiden, The J. Geils Band, Joan Jett, John Mellencamp, Jonathan Butler, Judas Priest, Kenny G, Kiss, Krokus, Loverboy, Madonna, Mötley Crüe, Nazareth, Neil Young, Night Ranger, Ozzy Osbourne, Poison, The Police, Public Image Ltd, Queensrÿche, Quiet Riot, Ratt, REO Speedwagon, Rick James, Robert Plant, Rush, Scandal, Scorpions, Starship, Stevie Nicks, Sting, Stryper, Survivor, Ted Nugent, Ten Years After, Tina Turner, Triumph, Tom Petty, Twisted Sister, Van Halen, U2, Whitesnake, Whitney Houston, Willie Nelson, Yes, as well as many of the bands who had already played the Sporto in the 1970s.

=== Other events ===
The Sportatorium was also regularly host to boxing, wrestling, tennis and ice skating events. Indoor short-track motorcycle racing was held in 1971. Roberto Durán successfully defended his WBA world lightweight championship at the Sportatorium on October 15, 1976, scoring a first-round knockout against Alvaro Rojas. In another bout on the same card, former heavyweight champion George Foreman, in the midst of his first comeback attempt, knocked out John (Dino) Dennis in the fourth round. The championship of the Women's Tennis Association tour, the Virginia Slims tennis tournament, took place at the Sportatorium in 1976, 1977, and 1978, featuring such well-known players as Fort Lauderdale local Chris Evert, Virginia Wade, and Margaret Court.

In addition, numerous conventions took place at the facility, including a Star Trek convention featuring Gene Roddenberry. The Jehovah's Witnesses also held religious assemblies there.

=== Concert problems ===
==== An "acoustical nightmare" ====
Despite hosting well-known musical acts, the Sportatorium was notorious for poor acoustics. Roger Waters described the Sportatorium as a "real compromise" because even though its acoustics left much to be desired, there was no other large concert venue in South Florida at the time. At one concert, Billy Joel reacted to the echo by calling the facility an "acoustical nightmare".

Ironically, numerous bootleg recordings of concerts from the Sportatorium by bands such as Pink Floyd, Rush, Ambrosia, AC/DC, Black Sabbath, and U2 remain sought after. In addition, one of the Grateful Dead's most critically praised live performances ever took place at the Sportatorium on May 22, 1977, most of which was commercially released in 1995 as Dick's Picks Volume 3.

==== Indoor rain delays ====
The Sportatorium roof was infamous for occasionally leaking over the stage (and performers) or the audience during heavy rainfalls. Robert Plant postponed a 1985 concert for one day due to leaks in the roof, and remarked to the crowd the following night, "This is the first gig I've ever done that was rained out inside the building."

==== Rowdyism ====
Raucous crowds frequently created problems at the Sportatorium. Minor incidents abounded, such as the throwing of firecrackers inside the arena. After one such firecracker-throwing incident in February 1981, Bruce Springsteen announced from the stage, "All right, whoever threw those can come down to the front of the stage. We'll give you your money back and throw you the fuck out of here." Other unruly fans were reported to have urinated on the stage during the show, leading Springsteen to later declare that he would never again perform there.

In July 1980, about 500 fans attending a Ted Nugent concert at the Sportatorium rioted after deputies from the Broward County Sheriff's Office arrested 15 people suspected of smoking marijuana and took them to a command trailer. The crowd held 35 deputies and 15 prisoners at bay in the trailer for nearly an hour. One deputy was injured by rocks and bottles thrown by the crowd. An additional 20 people were injured before deputies in riot gear ended the violence after 21 additional arrests.

In 1981, Pembroke Pines police arrested 13 people at a Rick James concert on charges of illegally carrying weapons, including a .38-caliber revolver and semiautomatic pistols, and possession of cocaine and marijuana.

On November 28, 1981, fans waiting to attend a Rush concert began throwing rocks and bottles at Florida Highway Patrol (FHP) officers and Sportatorium guards when the gates did not open on time due to the late arrival of Rush's drummer, Neil Peart. Neil had been sailing on his sailboat in the British Virgin Islands during a 10-day break and missed his original flight in due to weather and other unforeseen issues. Having to take a later flight that would've got him there in time, he sent a telegram to the venue explaining this. However, the telegram never made it, and workers for the band couldn't verify that he was on the plane (or as Neil put it in his book, Roadshow: Landscape with Drums, "In those pre-Homeland Security days, the airline I was flying on wouldn't release its passenger manifest."). When the doors were finally opened, gate crashers scaled the 11-foot (3.4 m) wall surrounding the facility and started running toward the gates. Officers sprayed tear gas on the intruders, resulting in additional rock throwing and fighting. Twenty-two people including 11 police officers were injured and two fans were arrested. As a result of this incident, a Sportatorium task force was created to handle the rowdyism and related problems.

Drug-related arrests at the arena peaked at 58 at the 17 concerts held in 1983.

==== Traffic ====
The Sportatorium was also infamous for creating severe traffic jams. Interstate 75 would not expand to the Miami area until 1986, and most concertgoers were forced to take a lengthy, miles-long trek westward on Pines Boulevard, which by 1985 was still only a two-lane road for 8 of the 10 miles (16 km) west of the Florida Turnpike, the nearest major highway. The traffic jam on what was then Hollywood Boulevard would frequently extend all the way back to the Turnpike itself. One passenger in the long line of cars for the 1978 John Denver concert was reported to have jumped out of the car he was riding in, jogged a quarter-mile ahead to a fast food restaurant, and received his order in time to walk out the front door and get back in the car he was riding without either having to pause.

Many fans – some without tickets – would turn the impenetrable traffic bottlenecks into impromptu tailgate parties. Cars frequently stalled because of overheated radiators, leading to many concertgoers setting out on foot. This posed some danger, however, because impatient drivers would sometimes attempt to dart down the shoulder of the road to bypass traffic, resulting in a number of pedestrians being struck.

The Broward Sheriff's Office recommended what regular concertgoers knew: to avoid this traffic by taking U.S. 27 either northwest from Miami or south from State Road 84 and approaching the arena from the west. In 1979, the Sportatorium sped up the flow of traffic somewhat by eliminating its $2.00 parking charge and adding a 50-cent charge on each ticket instead. In 1985, the county began widening a four-mile (6 km) stretch of Pines Boulevard from University Drive to Flamingo Road, although the remaining four miles—with the exception of the roadway immediately in front of the arena—remained two lanes.

Because of the horrendous traffic, performers drove out to the arena hours before the show. Elton John arrived by helicopter for a 1984 performance, while Kenny Rogers stopped playing at the Sportatorium for a few years after 200 to 300 ticketholders were unable to attend a show because of the traffic. Despite some improvements, half-hour delays in concert start times to accommodate late arrivals would remain common for bigger acts. After one such delay, Billy Joel remarked from the stage, "Fuck the traffic getting to this place!"

== Decline ==
In 1976, the Sunrise Musical Theater (now The Faith Center) opened in Sunrise, Florida. The theater was one of the first modern facilities in Broward County to try to compete with the Sportatorium. But because of its small capacity (3,732), it wasn't able to attract as many musical artists. Even so, the Sunrise Musical Theater hosted acts like Frank Sinatra, Peter Paul and Mary, The Beach Boys, U2, Sheena Easton, Barry Manilow, King Crimson, Frank Zappa and Black Sabbath.

The Sportatorium's fate was effectively sealed with the opening of Miami Arena in 1988. It gained a short reprieve in August and September 1988 when shows by AC/DC, Iron Maiden, and others that were originally scheduled to take place at the newer facility had to be moved to the Sportatorium due to construction delays. The last heavy metal group to perform at the arena was Judas Priest in September 1988. Although by the mid-1980s it had become known as the heavy-metal showplace of South Florida, the Sportatorium's final show on October 21, 1988, featured country music acts Highway 101, The Desert Rose Band, and Larry Boone.

In 1991, a franchise owner in the newly formed Continental Hockey Association proposed spending $6 million to renovate the Sportatorium, and negotiated a buy/lease agreement with Stephen Calder's heirs. The new team was to be called the Florida Makos, but shortly before the owner was due to put down a deposit on the Sportatorium and commence renovations, the fledgling hockey league failed. A month later, a developer proposed building 1,500 homes on the site and surrounding land, and the Pembroke Pines City Commission voted to change the land's zoning from commercial recreation to residential. In 1992, the Broward County Planning Council approved plans for 1,260 homes and a small shopping center on the site. In 1993, after several years of disuse as well as hurricane damage from the previous year's Hurricane Andrew, the Hollywood Sportatorium was torn down.

A Sedano's supermarket now occupies the precise site where the arena once stood. Some of the Sportatorium's target business would return to Broward County in 1998 with the completion of Amerant Bank Arena (originally the National Car Rental Center) in nearby Sunrise, Florida.
