= Terrapin Part 1 =

Song by the Grateful Dead

from the album Terrapin Station
- Released: July 27, 1977
- Genre: Progressive rock; art rock
- Length: 16:23
- Label: Arista
- Songwriters: Jerry Garcia; Mickey Hart; Bill Kreutzmann; Robert Hunter
- Producer: Keith Olsen

"Terrapin Part 1" is a song suite by the Grateful Dead. Released on their 1977 album Terrapin Station, it takes up the album's entire second side. The piece, split up into seven distinct movements, is the band's longest studio recording at sixteen minutes and twenty-three seconds long. While the Grateful Dead never performed the song live in full, the first three sections of the song (usually denoted as simply "Terrapin Station") became commonplace in the band's setlists. The song's lyrics were written by Robert Hunter, with the music being written by Jerry Garcia, Mickey Hart, and Bill Kreutzmann. (Note: Despite being an instrumental segment, Hunter is also credited as a writer for the "Terrapin" section of the song.)

Since the 1995 death of Garcia and the dissolution of the Grateful Dead, many groups consisting of former members of the band, such as Furthur and Bob Weir & Wolf Bros, have performed the piece in full (a performance of the suite sans "Terrapin Transit" appears on Wolf Bros' Live in Colorado Vol. 2).

== Background ==
"Terrapin Part 1" includes the only lead vocal from Garcia on Terrapin Station, with all other lead vocals on the album being shared by Bob Weir and Donna Jean Godchaux. The "Part 1" in the title refers to the fact that only a portion of Hunter's lyrics intended for the piece were used. Hunter's 1980 album Jack O' Roses contains a version of the suite with portions cut from the Grateful Dead version, including sections entitled "Ivory Wheels/Rosewood Track" and "Jack O' Roses". An unused piece of music intended for the suite, entitled "The Ascent", was included on the 2004 reissue of Terrapin Station appearing in the Beyond Description (1973–1989) box set. A three-minute excerpt of the song was used as the B-side to the single releases of "Dancin' in the Streets" and "Passenger".

In his book A Box of Rain, Hunter stated that the title "Terrapin Station" came about as "the first thing that came into [his] mind" at the beginning of a writing session that would yield the entire set of lyrics written for the track.

The song marks a noticeable departure from the band's usual sound due to Keith Olsen's production. Performances by the Martyn Ford Orchestra and the English Chorale were added to the track, giving it a much more produced sound and sharing some similarities with the heavily orchestrated sound of progressive rock. These additions proved to be controversial; Hart felt Olsen's decision to replace a timbali part with strings was "disrespectful", while Kreutzmann called the string arrangements "really grandiose, like somebody's ego is playing those strings."

== Structure ==
I. "Lady with a Fan" (Garcia, Hunter)

The opening section, "Lady with a Fan" features lyrics inspired by the English ballad "The Lady of Carlisle". This section shifts through numerous time signatures, including common time, 6/8, 3/8, and 2/4., and is written in F Lydian. While "Lady with a Fan" almost always preceded the "Terrapin Station" section, the latter was performed separately during the band's May 22, 1977 concert (found on Dick's Picks Volume 3).

II. "Terrapin Station" (Garcia, Hunter)

The second of three vocal sections, "Terrapin Station" shifts to A major, and features the first appearance of string arrangements. Much like "Lady with a Fan", this section shifts between multiple time signatures, in this case common time, 2/4, and 3/4.

III. "Terrapin" (Garcia, Hunter)

"Terrapin" is an instrumental section which is heavily orchestrated in its studio form. Live performances of "Terrapin Part 1" will most commonly conclude with this section, segueing into the "Drums" > "Space" portion of the show in most cases. The segment revolves around repeating guitar motifs and a stop-start rhythm.

IV. "Terrapin Transit" (Hart, Kreutzmann)

This portion of the piece (along with an instrumental arrangement of "At a Siding" and a quickly abandoned "Terrapin Flyer") was only performed live once, on March 18, 1977 (under the name "The Alhambra"). The short section consists of various percussion instruments played by Hart and Kreutzmann accompanied by strings.

V. "At a Siding" (Hart, Hunter)

"At a Siding" is the third and final section to feature vocals from Garcia. It sets a relatively darker tone than that of the rest of the suite, centered around a repeating D#-D chord progression. As opposed to the more uplifting "Terrapin Station", the lyrics of "At a Siding" take a more pessimistic turn ("You're back in Terrapin for good or ill again"). This section eventually moves into the heavily contrasting "Terrapin Flyer" segment.

VI. "Terrapin Flyer" (Hart, Kreutzmann)

"Terrapin Flyer" is a fast section heavily featuring percussion work by Hart and Kreutzmann alongside orchestration and a guitar solo by Garcia. This section was included as its own track on the Rhino compilation Max Weinberg Presents: Let There Be Drums! Vol. 3: The 70s.

VII. "Refrain" (Garcia)

The final section of the song, "Refrain" is a reprise of the "Terrapin" section with the addition of the English Chorale.

== Reception and legacy ==
"Terrapin Part 1" has received highly positive reviews since its release, and is by many considered one of the band's greatest compositions. Rolling Stone Australia included the song in their list of "Jerry Garcia's 50 Greatest Songs", highlighting "Lady with a Fan" as having "one of Garcia's prettiest melodies" and praising the orchestral elements as "a Baroque climax of massed choral vocals and strings." This is Dig listed it as the third-best Grateful Dead song, stating that while "the studio version's production is contentious among Deadheads, there's no disguising the song's ambition, power and strikingly evocative lyrics."

Jam band Phish covered "Terrapin Part 1" during their encore at Virginia Beach Amphitheater on August 9th, 1998. It was performed to commemorate the passing of Jerry Garcia, which occurred the same day just three years prior. Additionally, it was performed the same way the Grateful Dead performed it live, excluding movements IV-VII. Though not the only time Phish had covered the Grateful Dead up to this point, this would be the first time in over ten years for Phish.

A cover of the entire piece performed by the National alongside members of Grizzly Bear, Sō Percussion and the Brooklyn Youth Chorus was featured on the 2016 Grateful Dead covers album Day of the Dead.

In August 2026, Rolling Stone ranked "Terrapin" as the 5th best Grateful Dead song of all time.

== Personnel ==
- Jerry Garcia – lead guitar, vocals
- Bob Weir – rhythm guitar, vocals
- Phil Lesh – bass guitar
- Mickey Hart – drums, percussion
- Bill Kreutzmann – drums, percussion
- Keith Godchaux – keyboards, piano, synthesizer, vocals
- Donna Jean Godchaux – vocals

Additional personnel:

- Paul Buckmaster – orchestral arrangements
- Martyn Ford Orchestra
- The English Chorale
