= Nicolaes Pickenoy =

Dutch painter (1588–1653/1656)

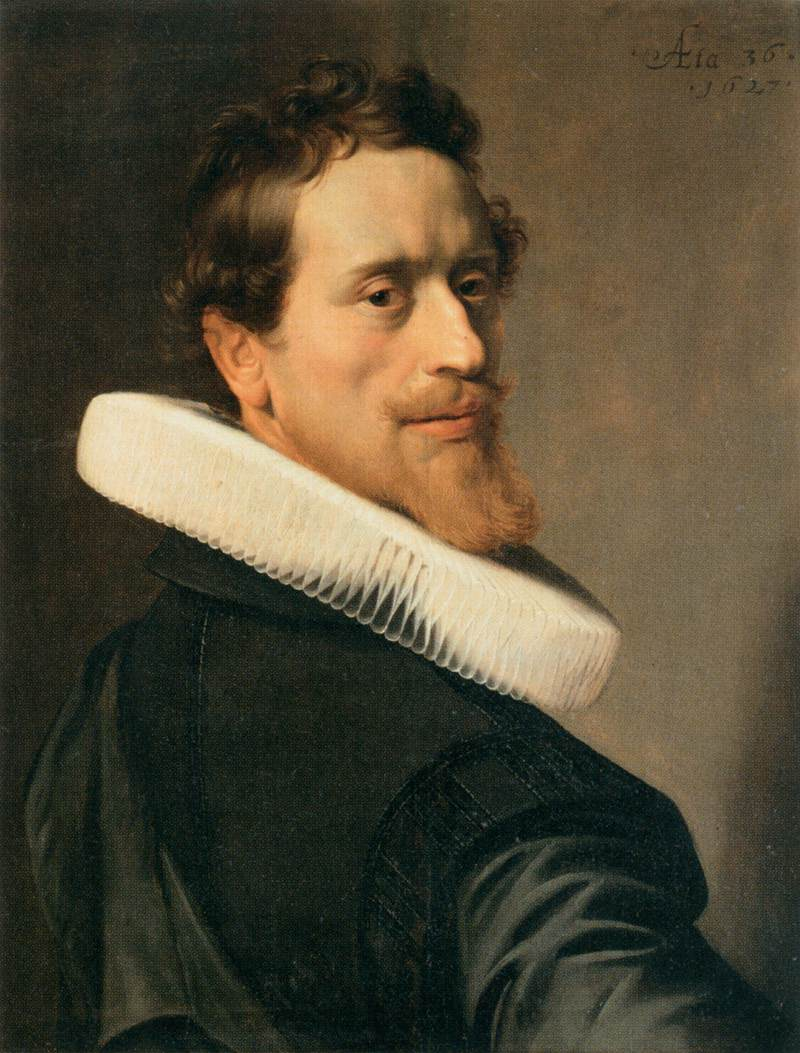
Self-portrait at the age of thirty-six (1627)

Nicolaes Eliaszoon Pickenoy (10 January 1588 – 1653/1656) was a Dutch painter of Flemish origin. Pickenoy was possibly a pupil of Cornelis van der Voort and presumably Bartholomeus van der Helst was his own pupil.

== Life ==
He was the son of the Antwerp monumental mason Elias Claeszoon Pickenoy (1565–1640) and Heijltje Laurens s'Jonge (1562–1638), who emigrated to Amsterdam before Nicolaes Pickenoy was born. In 1621, living near the Oude Kerk, he married Levijntje Bouwens (1599-na 1656), an orphan of 21 years. They had ten children: Sara and Elias died young.

Pickenoy painted large Schuttersstukken, group portraits of the regents of the orphanage, and individual portraits of local or national celebrities like Nicolaes Tulp, Cornelis de Graeff, Maarten Tromp and Jochem Swartenhont, Elisabeth Bas's husband. The earliest picture ascribed to the artist is "Dr. Sebastiaen Egbertz de Vrij's Osteological Presentation" of 1619, now in Amsterdam Historisch Museum. His heyday was ca. 1630–1637, a period marked by a high artistic level and numerous commissions from prominent patrons. After 1637 he painted little, save for a number of prestigious—and lucrative—group portraits. Besides portraits, he also painted a small number of biblical subjects, one of which can be seen in the Museum Catharijneconvent. The Rijksmuseum Amsterdam and Amsterdams Historisch Museum hold many of his best works, not least the Schutterstukken or militia paintings.

Around 1638 he bought the house next to Rembrandt van Rijn from Nicolaes Seys Pauw, on the corner of Sint Anthoniessluis and Jodenbreestraat, a fashionable area with many painters, art dealers, jewellers and so on. Till 1620 the house had been owned by his master, Cornelis van der Voort, and rented out to Hendrick van Uylenburgh from 1626. During the years 1631–1634 the latter was collaborating with Rembrandt, who painted numerous portraits for Van Uylenburgh's art business. Thus the house Pickenoy purchased had been a centre of Amsterdam portraiture for decades. In 1639 Rembrandt returned to the neighbourhood as he bought the house next to Pickenoys, on the site of the present day Rembrandthuis. Rembrandt could leave his house via an exit onto the Zwanenburgwal under the house of his neighbor Pickenoy. He brought out Night Watch—painted in his courtyard—rolled up through the tunnel. Like Rembrandt, Pickenoy was not able to bring up the loan and he sold the house in 1645.

The work of Pickenoy is difficult to distinguish from that of some of his contemporaries. Typical of Pickenoy are the fiercely invading light that makes the heads stand out sharply, the somewhat exaggerated gestures, the large greenish brown shadows and the odd-shaped eyes.

== Gallery of works ==
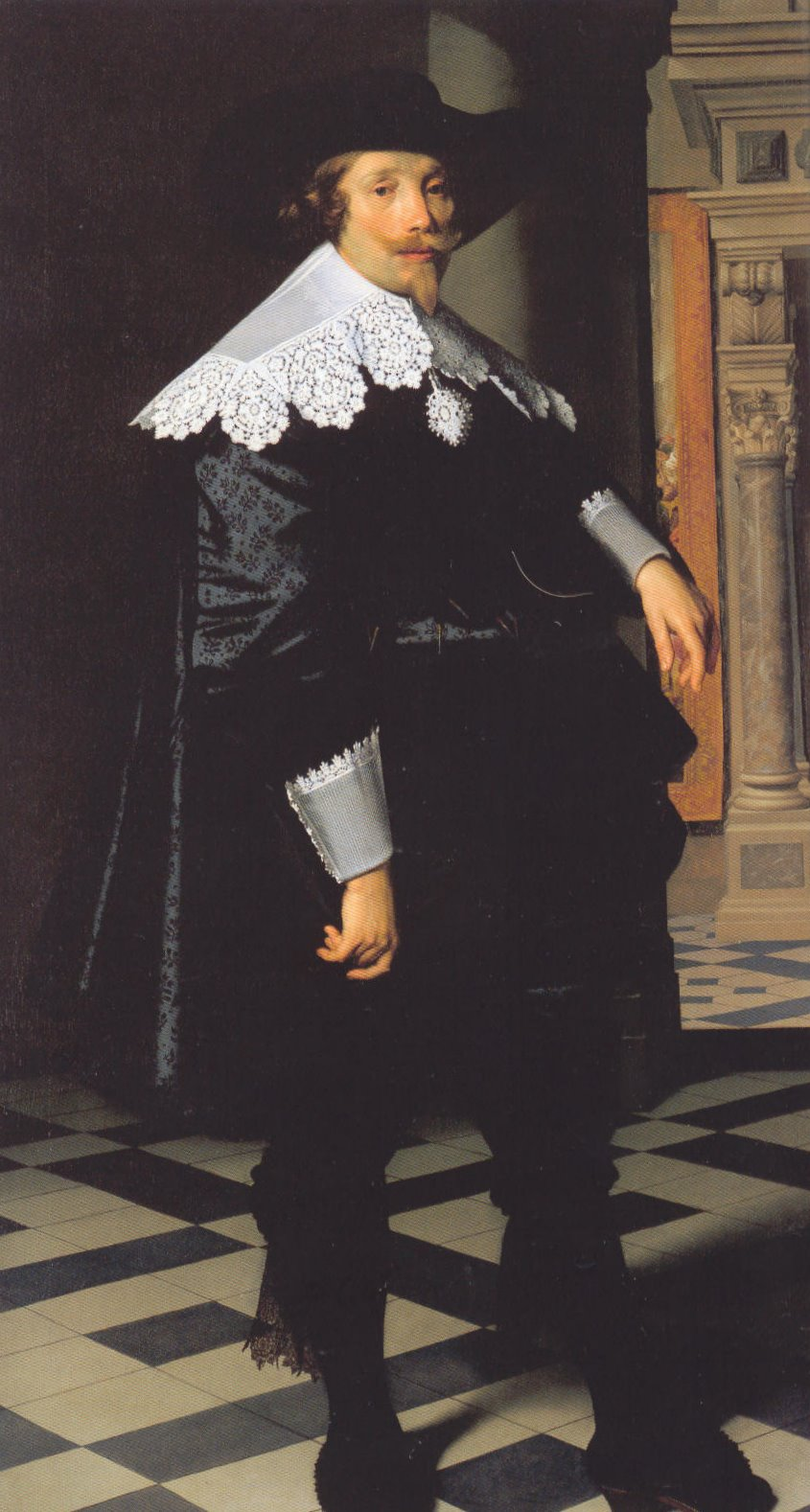
Cornelis de Graeff in 1636 by Nicolaes Eliaszoon Pickenoy, Gemäldegalerie Berlin

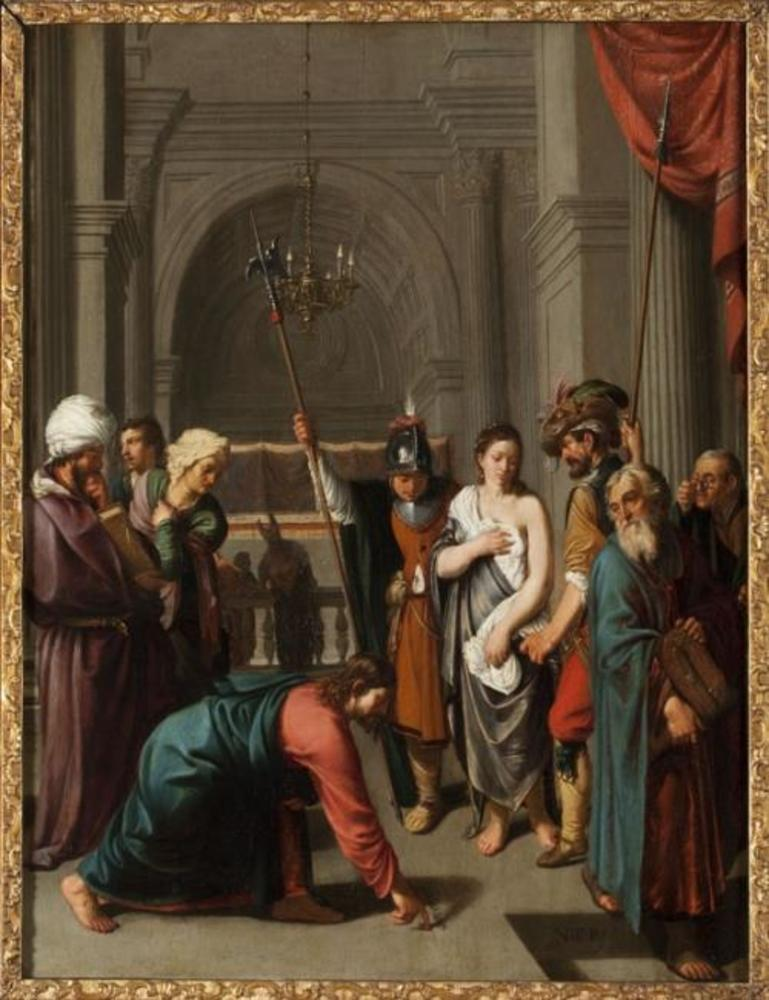
Pharisees bring a woman accused of adultery before Christ

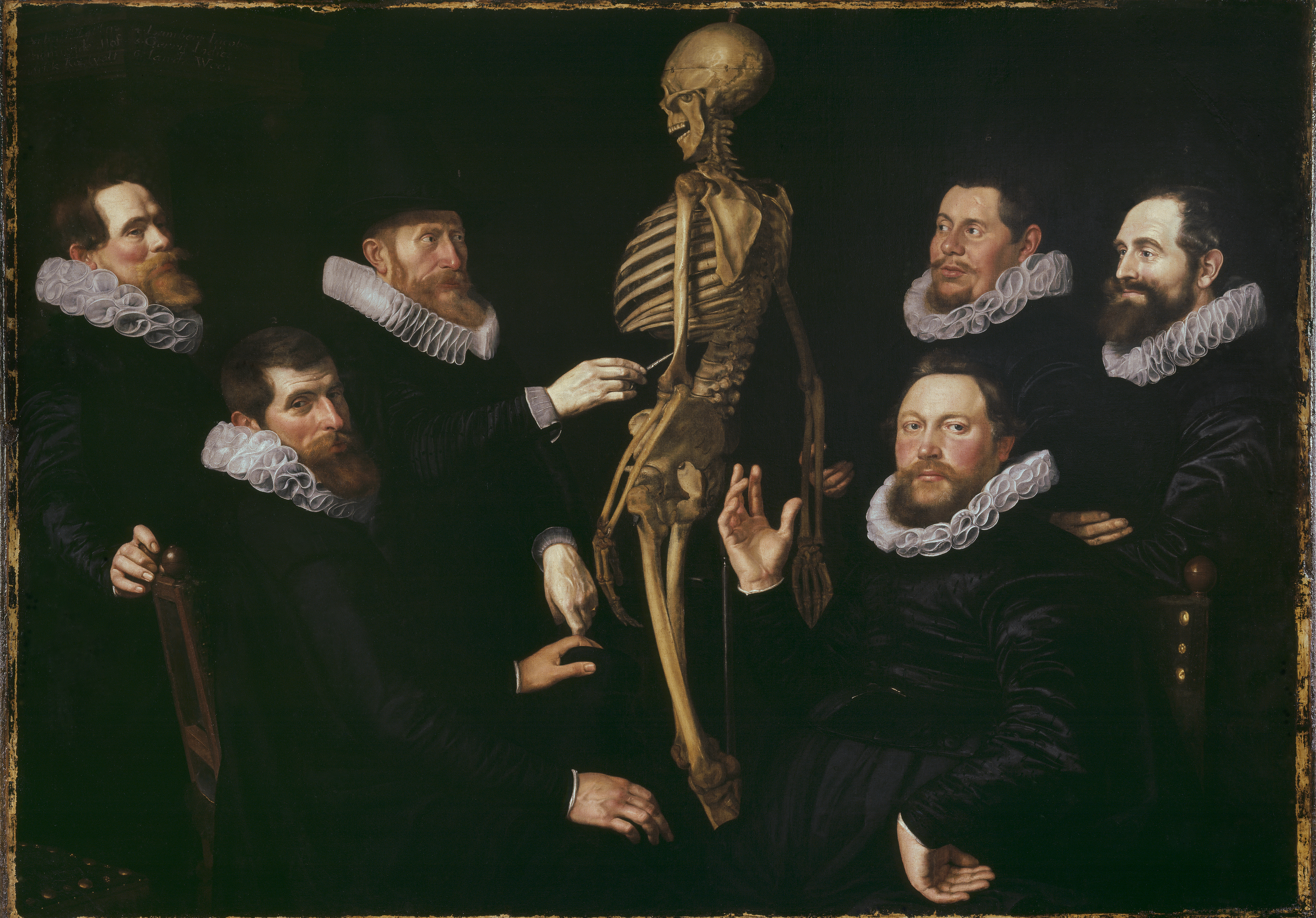
The Osteology Lesson of Dr. Sebastiaen Egbertsz

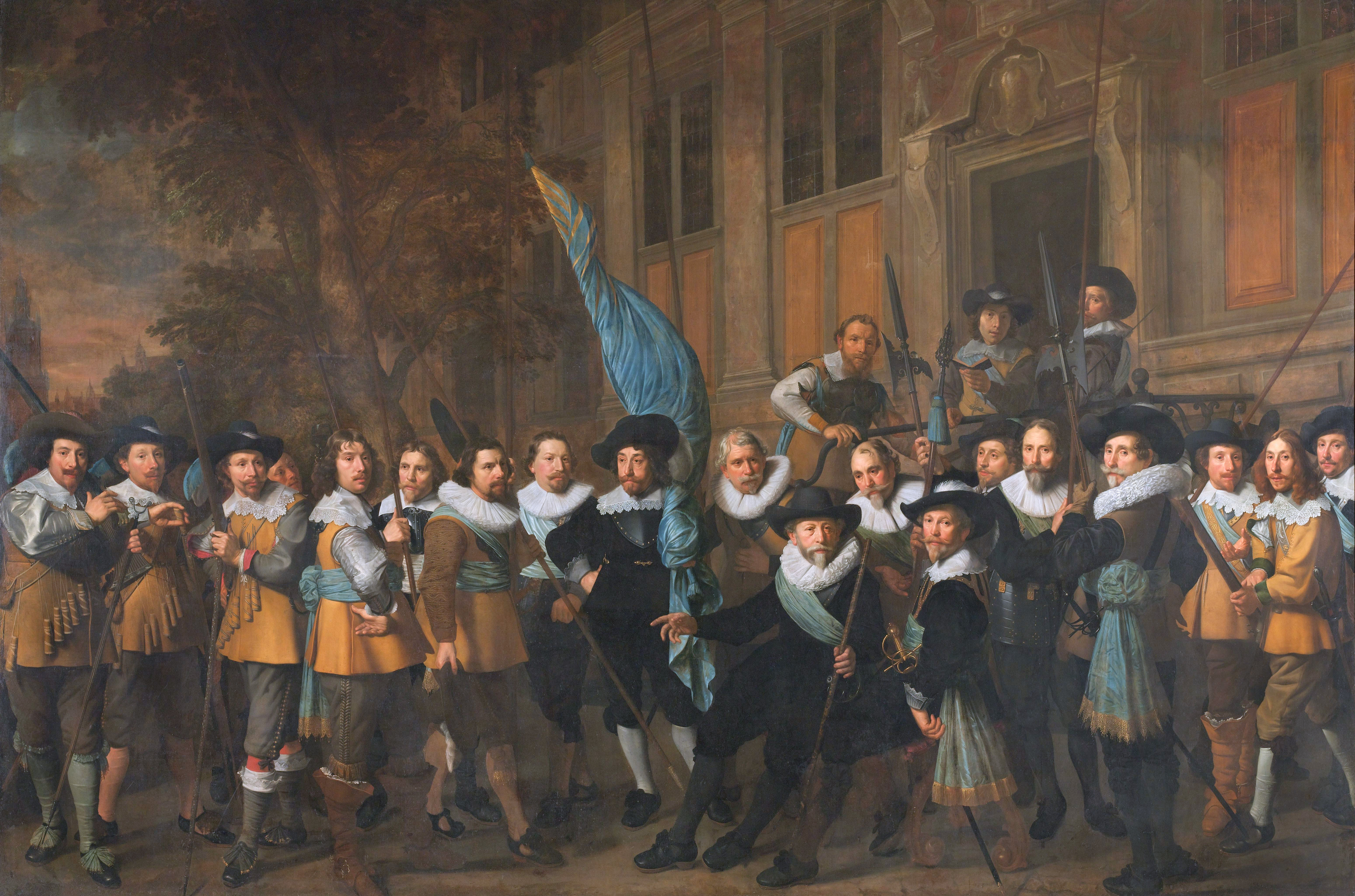
Officers and other Civic Guardsmen of the IV District of Amsterdam, under the Command of Captain Jan Claesz van Vlooswijck and Lieutenant Gerrit Hudde, 1642

== Sources ==
- Oosthoek's Geïllustreerde Encyclopaedie (1917)
- Dudok van Heel, S.A.C. (1985) De schilder Nicolaes Eliasz. Pickenoy en zijn familie; Liber Amicorum voor Jhr M.C.C. van Valkenburg, pp. 152–60.
- Kaaring, David Burmeister: "Nicolaes Eliasz Pickenoy (1588-1650/56) and Portraiture in Amsterdam around 1620-45", in: SMK Art Journal 2005, 127-137 .(For illustrations see: "Nicolaes Eliasz Pickenoy (1588-1650/56) og den amsterdamske portrætkunst, ca. 1620-45", SMK Art Journal 2005, 60–81)
