= Woman with a Fan (Picasso, 1908) =

Painting by Pablo Picasso

Woman with a Fan is a 1907 or 1908 oil on canvas painting by Pablo Picasso, now in the Hermitage Museum, in Saint Petersburg. It shows the strong influence of Paul Cézanne, African art and classical Greek art. It was owned by Sergei Shchukin and later the Antikvariat All-Union Association, entering its present home in 1934.

== See also ==
- Woman with a Fan (Picasso, 1909)
- 1908 in art
