= A Lady with a Fan =

Painting by Ferdinand Bol

- A Lady with a Fan
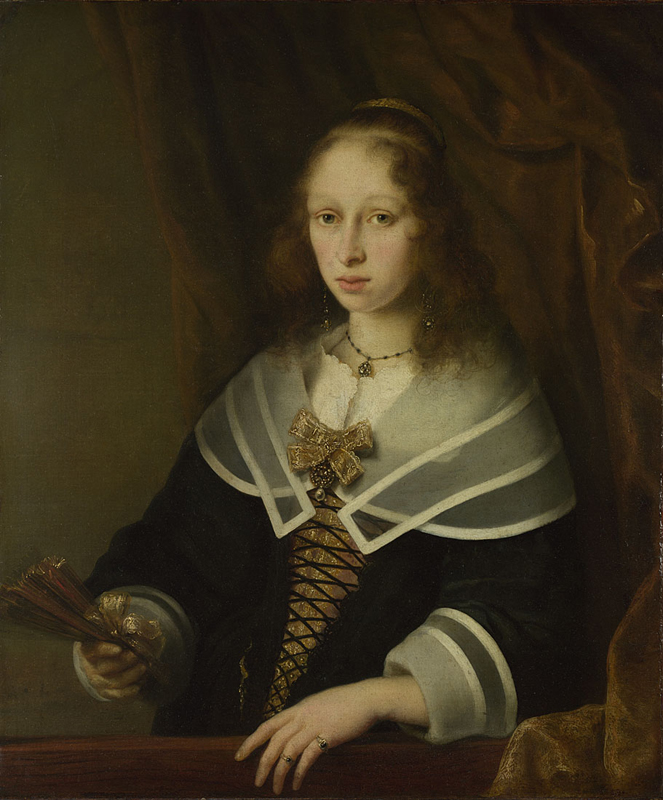
- Artist: Ferdinand Bol
- Dimensions: 83.5 cm (32.9 in) × 69.5 cm (27.4 in)
- Location: National Gallery
- Accession no.: NG5656
- Identifiers: Art UK artwork ID: a-lady-with-a-fan-114014

A Lady with a Fan is an oil-on-canvas painting created c. 1645–1650 by the Golden age of Dutch art painter Ferdinand Bol. It is held in the National Gallery, in London, to which it was bequeathed by Miss A.M. Philips in 1946. The subject has not been identified, though her clothing allows the painting to be dated. The underdrawing of the painting includes several pentimenti, showing the artist changed the composition as he produced the work.
