= Woman with a Fan (Picasso, 1909) =

1909 painting by Pablo Picasso

- Lady with a Fan (English), Femme à l'éventail (French)
- Lady with a Fan (1909) by Pablo Picasso
- Artist: Pablo Picasso
- Year: 1909
- Medium: Oil painting
- Dimensions: 101 cm × 81 cm (40 in × 32 in)
- Location: The Pushkin State Museum of Fine Arts, Moscow

Woman with a Fan is a 1909 oil on canvas painting by Pablo Picasso. It has been held in the Pushkin Museum in Moscow since 1948. It was owned by collector Sergei Shchukin until being seized by the Russian state after the October Revolution in 1917 and assigned to the State Museum of Modern Western Art.

In this painting it can be noticed the influence that African art had on Picasso's works at this time, for example in the dark and sculpted features of the face and in the oval shape of the eyes.

== See also ==
- Woman with a Fan (Picasso, 1908)
- 1909 in art
