= Heinrich Kley =

German painter

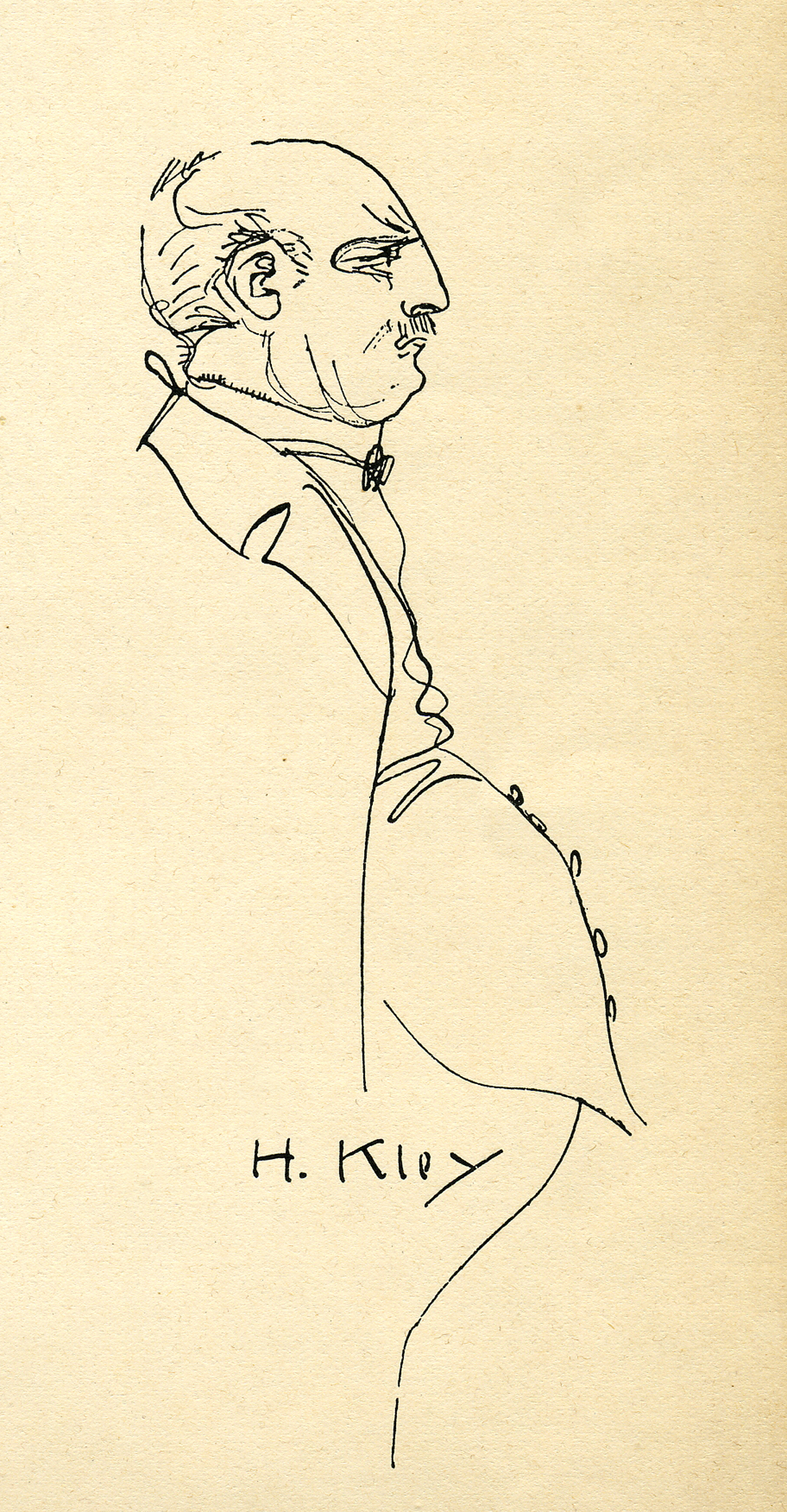
Self-portrait, 1910

Heinrich Kley (15 April 1863 in Karlsruhe – 1945 in Munich) was a German illustrator, editorial illustrator and painter.

== Training and Career ==
Kley studied "practical arts" at the Karlsruhe Akademie and finished his studies in Munich. His early works were conventional portraits, landscapes, still lifes, city scenes and historical paintings. From about 1892 he won a reputation as an "industry artist", painting manufacturing scenes in oils and watercolors. They proved his deep understanding of the modern machine world. Kley attained greater notoriety with his sometimes darkly humorous pen drawings, published in Jugend and the notorious Simplicissimus.

A collection of Kley's two published sketchbooks was sold under the title Sammelalbum alter und neuer Zeichnungen (Album of Old and New Drawings) which was banned under the Nazi regime.

== Death ==
The date of Kley's death is uncertain. Rumors initially suggested his demise in 1937, then again in the early 1940s. It is also suggested that Kley died on 2 August 1945. Some sources mention the date of death as 8 February 1952. According to the Nazi banned books list, Kley died "08.02.1945", i.e., February 8, 1945.

== Disney ==
Cartoonist Joe Grant was well aware of Kley's work and introduced his drawings to Walt Disney, who built an extensive private collection. A number of early Disney productions, notably Fantasia, reveal Kley's inspiration.

Because of Disney's interest and reprints by Dover Publications, Kley is still known in the US, while he is nowadays little regarded in Germany.

== Books ==
- Heinrich Kley, Leut‘ und Viecher. Album. Albert Langen Verlag München o. J.
- Heinrich Kley, Skizzenbuch. Hundert Federzeichnungen. Albert Langen Verlag München o. J.
- Heinrich Kley, Skizzenbuch II. Hundert Federzeichnungen. Albert Langen Verlag München o. J.
- Hetaerenbriefe. Eine Auswahl aus Alciphron, Lucian u. a. Übersetzt von Dr. Hans W. Fischer. Mit Bildern von Heinrich Kley. Georg H. Wigand‘sche Verlagsbuchhandlung Leipzig o.J.
- Lucian, Lucius oder der Esel. Vorwort von Georg Cordesmühl. Bilder von Heinrich Kley. Georg H. Wigand‘sche Verlagsbuchhandlung Leipzig o.J.
- Vergils Aeneis. Travestiert von Alois Blumauer. Illustriert von Heinrich Kley. Berthold Sutter Verlag München 1910
- Justinus Kerner, Die Reiseschatten. Mit Urzinkzeichnungen von Heinrich Kley . Hans von Weber Verlag München 1921
- Festzug. Jubiläum der Universität Heidelberg 1386 - 1886. Festzugs-Album, von Heinrich Kley in Karlsruhe unter Leitung von Professor Hoff entworfen und gezeichnet. Verlag von Bangel & Schmitt (Otto Petters), Univ.-Buchhandlung und Edmund von König, Kunsthandlung in Heidelberg (vermutlich Kleys erste Veröffentlichung)
- The Drawings of Heinrich Kley. Dover Publications New York 1962
- More Drawings of Heinrich Kley. Sketchbook I and II. With an introduction. Dover Publications New York 1961
- The Lost Art of Heinrich Kley, Volume 1: Drawings. With a foreword by Michael Wm. Kaluta. Picture This Press, Silver Spring: Maryland, 2012
- The Lost Art of Heinrich Kley, Volume 2: Paintings and Sketches. With a foreword by Joseph V. Procopio. Picture This Press, Silver Spring: Maryland, 2012
