= Playing in the Band, Seattle, Washington, 5/21/74 =

Live album by Grateful Dead
- Released: November 23, 2018
- Recorded: May 21, 1974
- Venue: Hec Edmundson Pavilion
- Genre: Rock
- Length: 46:24
- Labels: Rhino (R1 573385)
- Producer: Grateful Dead

Grateful Dead chronology
Dave's Picks Volume 28 (2018)	Playing in the Band, Seattle, Washington, 5/21/74 (2018)	Dave's Picks Volume 29 (2019)

Playing in the Band, Seattle, Washington, 5/21/74 is a live album by the rock band the Grateful Dead. It was recorded on May 21, 1974 at Hec Edmundson Pavilion in Seattle. It was released as a vinyl LP in a limited edition of 7,400 copies on November 23, 2018, as part of Record Store Day Black Friday.

The album contains only one song, "Playing in the Band". At 46 minutes in length, it is the longest continuous Grateful Dead song ever recorded. This recording was previously released earlier in 2018 as part of the albums Pacific Northwest '73–'74: The Complete Recordings and Pacific Northwest '73–'74: Believe It If You Need It. As featured on the album cover, the show utilized the band's Wall of Sound concert sound system.

Playing in the Band is the second Grateful Dead LP that contains only one song and that was produced for Record Store Day. The first was Dark Star, which was recorded in 1972 and released in 2012.

== Track listing ==
Side A

- "Playing in the Band" (Bob Weir, Mickey Hart, Robert Hunter) – 21:40

Side B

- "Playing in the Band", continued (Weir, Hart, Hunter) – 24:44

== Personnel ==
Grateful Dead

- Jerry Garcia – guitar, vocals
- Donna Jean Godchaux – vocals
- Keith Godchaux – keyboards
- Bill Kreutzmann – drums
- Phil Lesh – bass, vocals
- Bob Weir – guitar, vocals

Production

- Produced by Grateful Dead
- Produced for release by David Lemieux
- Mastering: Jeffrey Norman
- Recording: Kidd Candelario
- Tape restoration: Jamie Howarth, John Chester
- Lacquers: Chris Bellman
- Art direction, design: Lisa Glines
