= 30 Trips Around the Sun: The Definitive Live Story 1965–1995 =

Live album by Grateful Dead
- Released: September 18, 2015
- Recorded: 1965–1995
- Genre: Rock
- Length: 277:13
- Label: Rhino
- Producer: Grateful Dead

Grateful Dead chronology
Dave's Picks Volume 15 (2015)	30 Trips Around the Sun: The Definitive Live Story 1965–1995 (2015)	30 Trips Around the Sun (2015)

30 Trips Around the Sun: The Definitive Live Story 1965–1995 is a four-CD live album by the rock band the Grateful Dead. It contains 30 songs recorded in concert—one from each of the years 1966 through 1995—plus one song recorded in a 1965 studio session. All of the tracks are selected from the 80-CD box set 30 Trips Around the Sun, which contains 30 previously unreleased complete shows. The album was released on September 18, 2015.

== Production ==
Speaking about the selection of concerts for the box set from which the Definitive Live Story tracks were excerpted, producer and tape archivist David Lemieux said, "Our first criterion was the very best live music to represent any given year in the band's history. We wanted to make sure that there were not only the tent-pole shows that fans have been demanding for decades but also ones that are slightly more under the radar, but equally excellent."

== Critical reception ==
Professional ratings
Review scores
Source	Rating
AllMusic	4/5 stars

On AllMusic, Stephen Thomas Erlewine wrote, "Most of all, 30 Trips illustrates how the Dead kept circling back to their folk and blues beginnings no matter who supplemented the core quintet of Jerry Garcia, Bob Weir, Phil Lesh, Bill Kreutzmann, and Mickey Hart. While the four or five main keyboardists brought their own signatures (particularly Pigpen, whose rough-hewn growl provided a gritty counterpart to the band's spacy early explorations), come 1971, the year after the twin masterpieces of Workingman's Dead and American Beauty, the Dead maintained a groove more psychedelic in spirit than sound.... If you take all 30 trips, the Dead's journey feels long and sweet and unlike anything else in rock."

== Track listing ==
Disc one

No.	Title	Writer(s)	Date/venue	Length
1.	"Caution (Do Not Stop on Tracks)"	Jerry Garcia, Bill Kreutzmann, Phil Lesh, Ron McKernan, Bob Weir	November 3, 1965, Golden Gate Recorders, San Francisco, California (Note: More from the session was previously released on Birth of the Dead and So Many Roads (1965–1995))	3:17
2.	"Cream Puff War"	Garcia	July 3, 1966, Fillmore Auditorium, San Francisco (Note: More from this concert was previously released on Rare Cuts and Oddities 1966)	5:10
3.	"Viola Lee Blues"	Noah Lewis	November 10, 1967, Shrine Auditorium, Los Angeles, California	15:17
4.	"Dark Star"	Garcia, Mickey Hart, Kreutzmann, Lesh, McKernan, Weir, Robert Hunter	October 20, 1968, Greek Theatre, Berkeley, California	10:31
5.	"Doin' That Rag"	Garcia, Hunter	February 22, 1969, Dream Bowl, Vallejo, California	6:53
6.	"Dancing in the Street"	William Stevenson, Marvin Gaye, Ivy Jo Hunter	April 15, 1970, Winterland Arena, San Francisco (Note: Contains a patch from the April 12, 1970, San Francisco performance featured on Fallout from the Phil Zone)	11:31
7.	"Ain't It Crazy (The Rub)"	Lightnin' Hopkins	March 18, 1971, Fox Theatre, St. Louis, Missouri	4:43
8.	"Tomorrow Is Forever"	Dolly Parton	September 24, 1972, Palace Theatre, Waterbury, Connecticut	5:32
9.	"Here Comes Sunshine"	Garcia, Hunter	November 14, 1973, San Diego Sports Arena, San Diego, California	13:00

Notes

Disc two

No.	Title	Writer(s)	Date/venue	Length
1.	"Uncle John's Band"	Garcia, Hunter	September 18, 1974, Parc des Expositions, Dijon, France	9:28
2.	"Franklin's Tower"	Garcia, Kreutzmann, Hunter	September 28, 1975, Golden Gate Park, San Francisco	7:52
3.	"Scarlet Begonias"	Garcia, Hunter	October 3, 1976, Cobo Arena, Detroit, Michigan	12:00
4.	"Estimated Prophet"	Weir, John Barlow	April 25, 1977, Capitol Theatre, Passaic, New Jersey	8:00
5.	"Samson and Delilah"	traditional, arranged by Grateful Dead	May 14, 1978, Providence Civic Center, Providence, Rhode Island	10:20
6.	"Lost Sailor" → "Saint of Circumstance"	Weir, Barlow	October 27, 1979, Cape Cod Coliseum, South Yarmouth, Massachusetts	12:28
7.	"Deep Elem Blues"	traditional, arranged by Grateful Dead	November 28, 1980, Lakeland Civic Center, Lakeland, Florida	4:59

Disc three

No.	Title	Writer(s)	Date/venue	Length
1.	"Shakedown Street"	Garcia, Hunter	May 16, 1981, Barton Hall, Ithaca, New York	16:32
2.	"Bird Song"	Garcia, Hunter	July 31, 1982, Manor Downs, Austin, Texas	9:42
3.	"My Brother Esau"	Weir, Barlow	October 21, 1983, The Centrum, Worcester, Massachusetts	5:22
4.	"Feel Like a Stranger"	Weir, Barlow	October 12, 1984, Augusta Civic Center, Augusta, Maine	10:07
5.	"Let It Grow"	Weir, Barlow	June 24, 1985, Riverbend Music Center, Cincinnati	12:38
6.	"Comes a Time"	Garcia, Hunter	May 3, 1986, Cal Expo Amphitheatre, Sacramento, California	7:52
7.	"Morning Dew"	Bonnie Dobson, Tim Rose	September 18, 1987, Madison Square Garden, New York City	11:21

Disc four

No.	Title	Writer(s)	Date/venue	Length
1.	"Not Fade Away"	Charles Hardin, Norman Petty	July 3, 1988, Oxford Plains Speedway, Oxford, Maine	8:02
2.	"Blow Away"	Brent Mydland, Barlow	October 26, 1989, Miami Arena, Miami, Florida	7:53
3.	"Ramble On Rose"	Garcia, Hunter	October 27, 1990, Zenith, Paris, France	7:33
4.	"High Time"	Garcia, Hunter	September 10, 1991, Madison Square Garden, New York City	7:39
5.	"Althea"	Garcia, Hunter	March 20, 1992, Copps Coliseum, Hamilton, Ontario	7:31
6.	"Broken Arrow"	Robbie Robertson	March 27, 1993, Knickerbocker Arena, Albany, New York	6:04
7.	"So Many Roads"	Garcia, Hunter	October 1, 1994, Boston Garden, Boston	7:30
8.	"Visions of Johanna"	Bob Dylan	February 21, 1995, Delta Center, Salt Lake City, Utah	10:22

== Personnel ==
Grateful Dead

- Jerry Garcia – lead guitar, vocals
- Bob Weir – rhythm guitar, vocals
- Ron "Pigpen" McKernan – organ, harmonica, percussion, vocals
- Bill Kreutzmann – drums
- Phil Lesh – electric bass, vocals
- Mickey Hart – drums (1967–1970, 1975–1995 shows)
- Tom Constanten – keyboards (1969 show)
- Keith Godchaux – keyboards (1972–1978 shows)
- Donna Jean Godchaux – vocals (1972–1978 shows)
- Brent Mydland – keyboards, vocals (1979–1989 shows)
- Vince Welnick – keyboards, vocals (1990–1995 shows)

N.B. years listed for the shows included in this release only, not each member's tenure in the band.

Additional musicians

- Bruce Hornsby – piano, vocals (1990–1991 shows)
- Branford Marsalis – saxophone (1991 show)

Production

- Produced by Grateful Dead
- Produced for release by David Lemieux, Doran Tyson, Mark Pinkus
- Associate producer: Ivette Ramos
- Mixing for 1967 and 1989 shows: Jeffrey Norman
- CD mastering: Jeffrey Norman, David Glasser
- Tape to digital transfers, wow and flutter correction: John K. Chester, Jamie Howarth
- Design, artwork: Steve Vance
- Art direction: Doran Tyson, Steve Vance
- Photos: Herb Greene, Mary Anne Mayer, Susana Millman, Bob Minkin, Paul Ryan
- Package supervision: Kate Dear
- Tape research: Michael Wesley Johnson
- Liner notes: Jesse Jarnow

== Charts ==
Chart (2015)	Peak position
Hungarian Albums (MAHASZ)	35
US Billboard 200	161
