= Portland Memorial Coliseum, Portland, OR, 5/19/74 =

Live album by Grateful Dead
- Released: September 7, 2018
- Recorded: May 19, 1974
- Genre: Rock
- Label: Rhino
- Producer: Grateful Dead

Grateful Dead chronology
Pacific Northwest '73–'74: Believe It If You Need It (2018)	Portland Memorial Coliseum, Portland, OR, 5/19/74 (2018)	Dave's Picks Volume 28 (2018)

Portland Memorial Coliseum, Portland, OR, 5/19/74 is a live album by the rock band the Grateful Dead. It contains the complete concert recorded at Portland Memorial Coliseum in Portland, Oregon on May 19, 1974. It was released as a six-disc LP, in a limited edition of 7,500 copies, on September 7, 2018.

The May 19 concert recording was also released on September 7, 2018, as part of the six-show, 19-CD box set Pacific Northwest '73–'74: The Complete Recordings.

== Track listing ==
Side 1
First set:

1. "Mississippi Half-Step Uptown Toodeloo" (Jerry Garcia, Robert Hunter) – 8:14
2. "Mexicali Blues" (Bob Weir, John Perry Barlow) – 3:58
3. "Big Railroad Blues" (Noah Lewis) – 3:57
4. "Black-Throated Wind" (Weir, Barlow) – 7:08

Side 2

1. "Scarlet Begonias" (Garcia, Hunter) – 5:12
2. "Beat It On Down the Line" (Jesse Fuller) – 3:47
3. "Tennessee Jed" (Garcia, Hunter) – 8:27
4. "Me and Bobby McGee" > (Fred Foster, Kris Kristofferson) – 6:02

Side 3

1. "Sugaree" (Garcia, Hunter) – 7:31
2. "Jack Straw" (Weir, Hunter) – 5:23
3. "It Must Have Been the Roses" (Hunter) – 5:28
4. "El Paso" (Marty Robbins) – 4:35

Side 4

1. "Loose Lucy" (Garcia, Hunter) – 5:07
2. "Money Money" (Weir, Barlow) – 4:27

Side 5

1. "China Cat Sunflower" > (Garcia, Hunter) – 8:34
2. "I Know You Rider" (traditional, arranged by Grateful Dead) – 5:40

Side 6
Second set:

1. "Promised Land" > (Chuck Berry) – 3:37
2. "Bertha" > (Garcia, Hunter) – 6:08
3. "Greatest Story Ever Told" (Weir, Hunter) – 6:10
4. "Ship of Fools" (Garcia, Hunter) – 6:36

Side 7

1. "Weather Report Suite" > (Weir, Eric Andersen) – 17:58

Side 8

1. "Wharf Rat" (Garcia, Hunter) – 10:49
2. "Big River" (Johnny Cash) – 5:36

Side 9

1. "Peggy-O" (traditional, arranged by Grateful Dead) – 8:11

Side 10

1. "Truckin'" > (Garcia, Phil Lesh, Weir, Hunter) – 9:15
2. "Jam" > (Grateful Dead) – 9:58

Side 11

1. "Not Fade Away" > (Buddy Holly, Norman Petty) – 6:58
2. "Goin' Down the Road Feeling Bad" (traditional, arranged by Grateful Dead) – 6:59
3. "One More Saturday Night" (Weir) – 5:36

Side 12
Encore:

1. "U.S. Blues" (Garcia, Hunter) – 5:37

== Personnel ==
Grateful Dead

- Jerry Garcia – lead guitar, vocals
- Donna Jean Godchaux – vocals
- Keith Godchaux – keyboards
- Bill Kreutzmann – drums
- Phil Lesh – bass, vocals
- Bob Weir – rhythm guitar, vocals

Production

- Produced by Grateful Dead
- Produced for release by David Lemieux
- Mastering: Jeffrey Norman
- Recording: Kidd Candelario
- Analog tape transfers and restoration: John K. Chester, Jamie Howarth - Plangent Processes
- Cover art: Roy Henry Vickers
- Photos: Richie Pechner
- Liner notes: Nicholas G. Meriwether
