= 30 Trips Around the Sun =

Live album and box set by Grateful Dead
- Released: October 7, 2015
- Recorded: 1965–1995
- Genre: Rock
- Length: 4443:28
- Label: Rhino
- Producer: Grateful Dead

Grateful Dead chronology
30 Trips Around the Sun: The Definitive Live Story 1965–1995 (2015)	30 Trips Around the Sun (2015)	Dave's Picks Volume 16 (2015)

Grateful Dead concert box set chronology
Spring 1990 (The Other One) (2014)	30 Trips Around the Sun (2015)	July 1978: The Complete Recordings (2016)

30 Trips Around the Sun is an 80-CD live album, packaged as a box set, by the rock band the Grateful Dead. Announced for the celebration of their 50th anniversary, it consists of 30 complete, previously unreleased concerts, with one show per year from 1966 through 1995. Comprising 73 hours of music, the box set is individually numbered and limited to 6,500 copies. It was released on October 7, 2015.

The package also includes a gold-colored vinyl 7-inch single which bookends the band's career. The A-side is "Caution (Do Not Stop on Tracks)" from the band's earliest recording session in 1965, with a B-side of the last song the band ever performed together live, "Box of Rain" recorded during their final encore at Soldier Field in Chicago on July 9, 1995. Also contained in the box set is a 288-page book that includes an extensive essay about the history of the Grateful Dead by band archivist Nicholas Meriwether, and a scroll that has "a visual representation of how the band's live repertoire has evolved through the years". Before it sold out, the box set was priced at $700.

All of the concerts were essentially previously unreleased. However, two tracks from the July 3, 1966 performance ("Gangster of Love" & "Don't Mess Up a Good Thing") previously appeared on Rare Cuts and Oddities, and one track ("Candyman") from April 15, 1970 is a bonus track on American Beauty. The seven-inch B-side, "Box of Rain", was previously released on the CD accompanying early prints of Phil Lesh's book Searching for the Sound, while another track from that July 9, 1995 performance ("So Many Roads") was released on So Many Roads.

Some tracks have been previously released informally as free downloads as part of the 30 Days of Dead series on the band's website. The July 3, 1966 performance of "Cream Puff War" was included in 30 Days of Dead in both 2013 and 2014. The October 3, 1976 performance of "Scarlet Begonias" was included in 30 Days of Dead in 2011. The June 24, 1985 performance of "My Brother Esau", the March 27, 1993 performance of "Loose Lucy" and the October 1, 1994 performance of "So Many Roads" were included in 30 Days of Dead in 2013.

A USB drive version of the collection was released December 11, 2015. It is shaped like a gold lightning bolt with the Grateful Dead 50th anniversary logo engraved on the side. The drive includes all of the music from the collection in both FLAC (96/24) and MP3 formats and is an individually numbered limited edition of 1,000 copies.

There is also a 4-CD album that was released September 18, 2015, with one song from each of the 30 concerts, plus the 1965 recording of "Caution". That album is called 30 Trips Around the Sun: The Definitive Live Story 1965–1995.

== Concerts ==
The shows included in the 80-disc box set are:

- 1966 – July 3, Fillmore Auditorium, San Francisco, California
- 1967 – November 10, Shrine Auditorium, Los Angeles, California
- 1968 – October 20, Greek Theatre, Berkeley, California
- 1969 – February 22, Dream Bowl, Vallejo, California
- 1970 – April 15, Winterland, San Francisco, California
- 1971 – March 18, Fox Theatre, St. Louis, Missouri
- 1972 – September 24, Palace Theatre, Waterbury, Connecticut
- 1973 – November 14, San Diego Sports Arena, San Diego
- 1974 – September 18, Parc des Expositions, Dijon, France
- 1975 – September 28, Lindley Meadow, Golden Gate Park, San Francisco
- 1976 – October 3, Cobo Arena, Detroit, Michigan
- 1977 – April 25, Capitol Theatre, Passaic, New Jersey
- 1978 – May 14, Providence Civic Center, Providence, Rhode Island
- 1979 – October 27, Cape Cod Coliseum, South Yarmouth, Massachusetts
- 1980 – November 28, Lakeland Civic Center, Lakeland, Florida
- 1981 – May 16, Barton Hall, Cornell University, Ithaca, New York
- 1982 – July 31, Manor Downs, Austin, Texas
- 1983 – October 21, The Centrum, Worcester, Massachusetts
- 1984 – October 12, Augusta Civic Center, Augusta, Maine
- 1985 – June 24, Riverbend Music Center, Cincinnati
- 1986 – May 3, Cal Expo Amphitheatre, Sacramento, California
- 1987 – September 18, Madison Square Garden, New York City
- 1988 – July 3, Oxford Plains Speedway, Oxford, Maine
- 1989 – October 26, Miami Arena, Miami, Florida
- 1990 – October 27, Le Zénith, Paris, France
- 1991 – September 10, Madison Square Garden, New York
- 1992 – March 20, Copps Coliseum, Hamilton, Ontario
- 1993 – March 27, Knickerbocker Arena, Albany, New York
- 1994 – October 1, Boston Garden, Boston
- 1995 – February 21, Delta Center, Salt Lake City

== Critical reception ==
On AllMusic, Stephen Thomas Erlewine wrote, "Initially released as a limited-edition box set so lavish it was on the verge of being absurd, 30 Trips Around the Sun is a deep exploration of a simple idea: tell the Grateful Dead's story through unreleased live performances taken from every year of their life.... Casual listening this is not but there are considerable rewards lying within a monthlong immersion, even for fans who are not dyed-in-the-wool Deadheads. Certainly, any listener drawn to an album that runs over 72 hours is by definition dedicated but 30 Trips holds appeal to a fan who hasn't spent time diligently keeping up with the picks of Dick and Dave because it is indeed a narrative, showcasing the progression (and occasional stagnation) of the Dead as no other compilation could."

== Personnel ==
Grateful Dead

- Jerry Garcia – lead guitar, vocals
- Bob Weir – rhythm guitar, vocals
- Bill Kreutzmann – drums
- Phil Lesh – electric bass, vocals
- Ron "Pigpen" McKernan – organ, harmonica, percussion, vocals (1966–1971 shows)
- Mickey Hart – drums (1967–1970, 1975–1995 shows)
- Tom Constanten – keyboards (1969 show)
- Keith Godchaux – keyboards (1972–1978 shows)
- Donna Jean Godchaux – vocals (1972–1978 shows)
- Brent Mydland – keyboards, vocals (1979–1989 shows)
- Vince Welnick – keyboards, vocals (1990–1995 shows)

N.B. years listed for the shows included in this release only, not each member's tenure in the band.

Additional musicians

- Ned Lagin – synthesizer ("Seastones" at 1974 show)
- Matt Kelly – guitar ("The Music Never Stopped" and "Beat It On Down the Line" at 1975 show)
- Bruce Hornsby – piano, vocals (1990–1991 shows)
- Branford Marsalis – saxophone (1991 show)

Production

- Produced by Grateful Dead
- Produced for release by David Lemieux
- Executive Producer: Mark Pinkus, Doran Tyson
- Associate Producer: Ivette Ramos
- Recorded by Owsley Stanley, Betty Cantor, Dan Healy, Kidd Candelario, Rex Jackson, John Cutler
- CD mastering: Jeffrey Norman, David Glasser
- Tape to digital transfers, wow and flutter correction: John K. Chester, Jamie Howarth
- Design, artwork: Steve Vance
- Art direction: Doran Tyson, Steve Vance
- Liner notes: Nicholas G. Meriwether, Jesse Jarnow, David Lemieux

== Track listing ==
The track listing for 30 Trips Around the Sun is:

=== July 3, 1966 – Fillmore Auditorium, San Francisco, California ===
- Jerry Garcia, Bill Kreutzmann, Phil Lesh, Ron "Pigpen" McKernan, Bob Weir
- Recorded by Owsley Stanley
- According to the album liner notes, the Grateful Dead played two sets at this show, with the group Love playing between the band's first and second sets. This is the earliest live show that has been released by the band.

Disc 1

1. "Nobody's Fault But Mine" (traditional, arranged by Grateful Dead) – 1:09
2. "Dancing in the Street" (William Stevenson, Marvin Gaye, Ivy Jo Hunter) – 7:59
3. "I Know You Rider" (traditional, arranged by Grateful Dead) – 3:05
4. "He Was a Friend of Mine" (Mark Spoelstra) – 4:16
5. "Next Time You See Me" (William G. Harvey, Frank Forest) – 3:32
6. "Viola Lee Blues" (Noah Lewis) – 7:39
7. "Big Boss Man" (Al Smith, Luther Dixon) – 3:49
8. "Sittin' on Top of the World" (Lonnie Carter, Walter Jacobs) – 2:21
9. "Keep Rolling By" (traditional, arranged by Grateful Dead) – 4:35

Disc 2

1. "New, New Minglewood Blues" (traditional, arranged by Grateful Dead) – 3:54
2. "Cold Rain and Snow" (traditional, arranged by Grateful Dead) – 3:16
3. "Tastebud" (Ron McKernan) – 6:37
4. "Beat It On Down the Line" (Jesse Fuller) – 2:48
5. "Cream Puff War" (Jerry Garcia) – 5:18
6. "Don't Mess Up a Good Thing" (Oliver Sain) – 3:14
7. "Cardboard Cowboy" (Phil Lesh) – 2:31
8. "Gangster of Love" (John Watson) – 5:10
9. "You Don't Have to Ask" (Garcia, Bill Kreutzmann, Lesh, McKernan, Bob Weir) – 4:32
10. "In the Midnight Hour" (Steve Cropper, Wilson Pickett) – 15:50

=== November 10, 1967 – Shrine Auditorium, Los Angeles, California ===
- Jerry Garcia, Mickey Hart, Bill Kreutzmann, Phil Lesh, Ron "Pigpen" McKernan, Bob Weir
- Recorded by Dan Healy
- This show was one of the few multi-track recordings the band made in 1967 and was recorded using an eight track recorder. Segments of this show are believed to have been used during the mixing of the Anthem of the Sun album.
- This concert was also released, in 2016, as a separate three-disc LP.

Disc 1

1. "Viola Lee Blues" (Lewis) – 15:58
2. "It Hurts Me Too" (Elmore James) – 4:40
3. "Beat It On Down the Line" (Fuller) – 3:27
4. "Morning Dew" (Bonnie Dobson, Tim Rose) – 7:39
5. "Good Morning Little Schoolgirl" (Sonny Boy Williamson) – 10:55

Disc 2

1. "That's It for the Other One" (Tom Constanten, Garcia, Kreutzmann, Lesh, McKernan, Weir) – 12:11
  - I. Cryptical Envelopment
  - II. The Other One
  - III. Cryptical Envelopment
2. "New Potato Caboose" > (Lesh, Robert Petersen) – 11:28
3. "Alligator" > (Lesh, McKernan, Robert Hunter) – 11:00
4. "Caution (Do Not Stop on Tracks)" (Garcia, Kreutzmann, Lesh, McKernan, Weir) – 24:28

=== October 20, 1968 – Greek Theatre, Berkeley, California ===
- Jerry Garcia, Mickey Hart, Bill Kreutzmann, Phil Lesh, Ron "Pigpen" McKernan, Bob Weir
- Recorded by Grateful Dead

Disc 1

1. "Good Morning Little Schoolgirl" (Williamson) – 13:53
2. "Turn On Your Lovelight" (Joseph Scott, Deadric Malone) – 13:38
3. "Dark Star" > (Garcia, Mickey Hart, Kreutzmann, Lesh, McKernan, Weir, Hunter) – 10:25
4. "St. Stephen" > (Garcia, Lesh, Hunter) – 6:37
5. "The Eleven" > (Lesh, Hunter) – 4:54
6. "Caution (Do Not Stop on Tracks)" > (Garcia, Kreutzmann, Lesh, McKernan, Weir) – 11:19
7. "Feedback" (Garcia, Hart, Kreutzmann, Lesh, McKernan, Weir) – 4:25

=== February 22, 1969 – Dream Bowl, Vallejo, California ===
- Tom Constanten, Jerry Garcia, Mickey Hart, Bill Kreutzmann, Phil Lesh, Ron "Pigpen" McKernan, Bob Weir
- Recorded by Owsley Stanley

Disc 1

First set:

1. "Dupree's Diamond Blues" > (Garcia, Hunter) – 4:12
2. "Mountains of the Moon" > (Garcia, Hunter) – 5:22
3. "Dark Star" > (Garcia, Hart, Kreutzmann, Lesh, McKernan, Weir, Hunter) – 22:14
4. "Cryptical Envelopment" > (Garcia) – 2:06
5. "The Other One" > (Weir, Kreutzmann) – 8:16
6. "Cryptical Envelopment" > (Garcia) – 6:31
7. "Death Don't Have No Mercy" (Gary Davis) – 7:19

Disc 2

Second set:

1. "Doin' That Rag" > (Garcia, Hunter) – 6:49
2. "St. Stephen" > (Garcia, Lesh, Hunter) – 9:07
3. "The Eleven" > (Lesh, Hunter) – 16:03
4. "Turn On Your Lovelight" (Scott, Malone) – 22:05

=== April 15, 1970 – Winterland, San Francisco, California ===
- Jerry Garcia, Mickey Hart, Bill Kreutzmann, Phil Lesh, Ron "Pigpen" McKernan, Bob Weir
- Recorded by Owsley Stanley

Disc 1

1. "Cold Rain and Snow" (traditional, arranged by Grateful Dead) – 6:05
2. "China Cat Sunflower" > (Garcia, Hunter) – 6:03 (Note: Contains a patch from the March 1, 1970 performance in San Francisco)
3. "I Know You Rider" (traditional, arranged by Grateful Dead) – 4:33
4. "Technical Difficulties" (Mama Tried false start) – 4:11
5. "Mama Tried" (Merle Haggard) – 3:08
6. "It's a Man's, Man's, Man's World" (James Brown, Betty Jean Newsome) – 8:31
7. "Candyman" (Garcia, Hunter) – 5:31 (Note: Previously released as a bonus track on American Beauty)
8. "Hard to Handle" (Otis Redding, Alvertis Isbell, Allen Jones) – 4:05 (Note: Contains a patch from the May 15, 1970, New York City performance featured on Road Trips Volume 3 Number 3)
9. "Cumberland Blues" (Garcia, Lesh, Hunter) – 5:43

Disc 2

1. "Cryptical Envelopment" > (Garcia) – 2:08
2. "Drums" > (Hart, Kreutzmann) – 4:15
3. "Jam" > (Garcia, Hart, Kreutzmann, Lesh, McKernan, Weir) – 5:59
4. "The Other One" > (Weir, Kreutzmann) – 8:37
5. "Cryptical Envelopment" > (Garcia) – 3:17
6. "Dire Wolf" (Garcia, Hunter) – 4:44
7. "Dancing in the Street" (Stevenson, Gaye, Hunter) – 11:27 (Note: Contains a patch from the April 12, 1970, San Francisco performance featured on Fallout from the Phil Zone)
8. "Turn On Your Lovelight" > (Scott, Malone) – 12:10 (Note: Contains a patch from the January 16, 1970, Gresham, Oregon performance featured on Download Series Volume 2)
9. "Not Fade Away" > (Charles Hardin, Norman Petty) – 2:16
10. "Turn On Your Lovelight" (Scott, Malone) – 7:45

=== March 18, 1971 – Fox Theatre, St. Louis, Missouri ===
- Jerry Garcia, Bill Kreutzmann, Phil Lesh, Ron "Pigpen" McKernan, Bob Weir
- Recorded by Rex Jackson

Disc 1

First set:

1. "Casey Jones" (Garcia, Hunter) – 5:35
2. "Me and My Uncle" (John Phillips) – 3:43
3. "Big Boss Man" (Smith, Dixon) – 4:58
4. "Bertha" (Garcia, Hunter) – 6:04
5. "Me and Bobby McGee" (Kris Kristofferson, Fred Foster) – 6:09
6. "Loser" (Garcia, Hunter) – 6:39
7. "China Cat Sunflower" > (Garcia, Hunter) – 4:50
8. "I Know You Rider" (traditional, arranged by Grateful Dead) – 5:39
9. "Ain't It Crazy (The Rub)" (Sam Hopkins) – 5:08
10. "Playing in the Band" (Weir, Hart, Hunter) – 5:14
11. "Cumberland Blues" (Garcia, Lesh, Hunter) – 5:48

Disc 2

Second set:

1. "Truckin'" > (Garcia, Lesh, Weir, Hunter) – 7:57
2. "Drums" > (Kreutzmann) – 5:55
3. "The Other One" > (Weir, Kreutzmann) – 11:31
4. "Wharf Rat" (Garcia, Hunter) – 10:32
5. "Sugar Magnolia" (Weir, Hunter) – 6:48

Disc 3

1. "Greatest Story Ever Told" > (Weir, Hart, Hunter) – 3:15
2. "Johnny B. Goode" (Chuck Berry) – 4:24
3. "Not Fade Away" > (Hardin, Petty) – 6:29
4. "Goin' Down the Road Feeling Bad" > (traditional, arranged by Grateful Dead) – 3:59
5. "Caution (Do Not Stop on Tracks)" > (Garcia, Kreutzmann, Lesh, McKernan, Weir) – 13:55
6. "Feedback" (Garcia, Kreutzmann, Lesh, McKernan, Weir) – 2:28

Encore:

7. "Uncle John's Band" (Garcia, Hunter) – 7:06

=== September 24, 1972 – Palace Theatre, Waterbury, Connecticut ===
- Jerry Garcia, Donna Jean Godchaux, Keith Godchaux, Bill Kreutzmann, Phil Lesh, Bob Weir
- Recorded by Owsley Stanley

Disc 1

First set:

1. "Big Railroad Blues" (Lewis) – 4:00
2. "Mexicali Blues" (Weir, John Barlow) – 3:50
3. "Loser" (Garcia, Hunter) – 6:36
4. "Black-Throated Wind" (Weir, Barlow) – 6:39
5. Cumberland Blues" (Garcia, Lesh, Hunter) – 6:48
6. "Sugaree" (Garcia, Hunter) – 7:27
7. "El Paso" (Marty Robbins) – 4:32
8. "Tennessee Jed" (Garcia, Hunter) – 7:53
9. "Beat It On Down the Line" (Fuller) – 3:23
10. "Bird Song" (Garcia, Hunter) – 9:17
11. "Big River" (Johnny Cash) – 5:04
12. "Brown-Eyed Women" (Garcia, Hunter) – 4:53

Disc 2

1. "Playing in the Band" (Weir, Hart, Hunter) – 17:31

Second set:

2. "Greatest Story Ever Told" > (Weir, Hart, Hunter) – 5:10
3. "Bertha" > (Garcia, Hunter) – 5:39
4. "Promised Land" (Berry) – 3:29
5. "Friend of the Devil" (Garcia, John Dawson, Hunter) – 3:47
6. "Jack Straw" (Weir, Hunter) – 5:08
7. "Tomorrow Is Forever" (Dolly Parton) – 5:36
8. "Me and My Uncle" (Phillips) – 3:07

Disc 3

1. "Dark Star" > (Garcia, Hart, Kreutzmann, Lesh, McKernan, Weir, Hunter) – 28:11
2. "Drums" > (Kreutzmann) – 2:03
3. "Dark Star" > (Garcia, Hart, Kreutzmann, Lesh, McKernan, Weir, Hunter) – 4:16
4. "China Cat Sunflower" > (Garcia, Hunter) – 5:38
5. "I Know You Rider" (traditional, arranged by Grateful Dead) – 7:03
6. "Sugar Magnolia" (Weir, Hunter) – 8:55

Encore:

7. "One More Saturday Night" (Weir) – 5:03

=== November 14, 1973 – San Diego Sports Arena, San Diego, California ===
- Jerry Garcia, Donna Jean Godchaux, Keith Godchaux, Bill Kreutzmann, Phil Lesh, Bob Weir
- Recorded by Kidd Candelario

Disc 1

First set:

1. "Big Railroad Blues" (Lewis) – 4:27
2. "Jack Straw" (Weir, Hunter) – 5:12
3. "Sugaree" (Garcia, Hunter) – 7:44
4. "Mexicali Blues" (Weir, Barlow) – 3:48
5. "Here Comes Sunshine" (Garcia, Hunter) – 13:13
6. "Black-Throated Wind" (Weir, Barlow) – 7:04
7. "Cumberland Blues" (Garcia, Lesh, Hunter) – 6:59
8. "Row Jimmy" (Garcia, Hunter) – 9:06
9. "The Race Is On" (Don Rollins) – 3:42
10. "Brown-Eyed Women" (Garcia, Hunter) – 5:32
11. "Beat It On Down the Line" (Fuller) – 3:19

Disc 2

1. "Tennessee Jed" (Garcia, Hunter) – 8:23
2. "El Paso" (Robbins) – 4:30
3. "China Cat Sunflower" > (Garcia, Hunter) – 8:56
4. "I Know You Rider" (traditional, arranged by Grateful Dead) – 5:34
5. "Around and Around" (Berry) – 5:19

End of the second set:

6. "Me and My Uncle" (Phillips) – 3:11
7. "Goin' Down the Road Feeling Bad" > (traditional, arranged by Grateful Dead) – 7:31
8. "One More Saturday Night" (Weir) – 5:03

Disc 3

Second set:

1. "Truckin' " > (Garcia, Lesh, Weir, Hunter) – 12:46
2. "The Other One" > (Weir, Kreutzmann) – 19:17
3. "Big River" > (Cash) – 4:59
4. "The Other One" > (Weir, Kreutzmann) – 6:12
5. "Eyes of the World" > (Garcia, Hunter) – 12:33
6. "The Other One" > (Weir, Kreutzmann) – 4:21
7. "Wharf Rat" (Garcia, Hunter) – 10:07

=== September 18, 1974 – Parc Des Expositions, Dijon, France ===
- Jerry Garcia, Donna Jean Godchaux, Keith Godchaux, Bill Kreutzmann, Phil Lesh, Bob Weir
- Ned Lagin – keyboards on "Seastones"
- Recorded by Kidd Candelario

Disc 1

First set:

1. "Uncle John's Band" (Garcia, Hunter) – 9:29
2. "Jack Straw" (Weir, Hunter) – 5:26
3. "Friend of the Devil" (Garcia, Dawson, Hunter) – 4:31
4. "Black-Throated Wind" (Weir, Barlow) – 7:12
5. "Scarlet Begonias" (Garcia, Hunter) – 8:49
6. "Mexicali Blues" (Weir, Barlow) – 3:28
7. "Row Jimmy" (Garcia, Hunter) – 10:43
8. "Beat It On Down the Line" (Fuller) – 3:43
9. "Deal" (Garcia, Hunter) – 4:50
10. "The Race Is On" (Rollins) – 3:24
11. "To Lay Me Down" (Garcia, Hunter) – 8:14

Disc 2

1. "Playing in the Band" (Weir, Hart, Hunter) – 23:18

Interlude:

2. "Seastones" (performed by Ned Lagin and Phil Lesh) – 15:35

Second set:

3. "Loose Lucy" (Garcia, Hunter) – 5:22
4. "Big River" (Cash) – 5:18
5. "Peggy-O" (traditional, arranged by Grateful Dead) – 6:58
6. "Me and My Uncle" (Phillips) – 2:53

Disc 3

1. "Eyes of the World" > (Garcia, Hunter) – 14:24
2. "China Doll" (Garcia, Hunter) – 7:23
3. "He's Gone" > (Garcia, Hunter) – 14:06
4. "Truckin' " > (Garcia, Lesh, Weir, Hunter) – 8:56
5. "Drums" > (Kreutzmann) – 4:57
6. "Caution Jam" > (Garcia, Keith Godchaux, Kreutzmann, Lesh, Weir) – 9:04
7. "Ship of Fools" (Garcia, Hunter) – 6:53
8. "Johnny B. Goode" (Berry) – 4:51

Encore:

9. "U.S. Blues" (Garcia, Hunter) – 5:38

=== September 28, 1975 – Golden Gate Park, San Francisco, California ===
- Jerry Garcia, Donna Jean Godchaux, Keith Godchaux, Mickey Hart, Bill Kreutzmann, Phil Lesh, Bob Weir
- Recorded by Betty Cantor

Disc 1

1. "Help on the Way" > (Garcia, Hunter) – 5:47
2. "Slipknot!" (Garcia, K. Godchaux, Kreutzmann, Lesh, Weir) – 8:35
3. "The Music Never Stopped" (Weir, Barlow) – 6:58 *
4. "They Love Each Other" (Garcia, Hunter) – 7:28
5. "Beat It On Down the Line" (Fuller) – 3:31 *
6. "Franklin's Tower" (Garcia, Kreutzmann, Hunter) – 8:18
7. "Big River" (Cash) – 5:15
8. "It Must Have Been the Roses" (Hunter) – 6:05

Disc 2

1. "Truckin' " > (Garcia, Lesh, Weir, Hunter) – 8:40
2. "The Eleven Jam" > (Garcia, K. Godchaux, Hart, Kreutzmann, Lesh, Weir) – 5:34
3. "Drums" > (Hart, Kreutzmann) – 5:51
4. "Stronger Than Dirt" / "Milkin' the Turkey" > (Hart, Kreutzmann, Lesh) – 6:26
5. "Not Fade Away" > (Hardin, Petty) – 10:15
6. "Goin' Down the Road Feeling Bad" > (traditional, arranged by Grateful Dead) – 6:53
7. "One More Saturday Night" (Weir) – 5:23

*with Matt Kelly

=== October 3, 1976 – Cobo Arena, Detroit, Michigan ===
- Jerry Garcia, Donna Jean Godchaux, Keith Godchaux, Mickey Hart, Bill Kreutzmann, Phil Lesh, Bob Weir
- Recorded by Dan Healy

Disc 1

First set:

1. "Bertha" (Garcia, Hunter) – 5:12
2. "Mama Tried" (Haggard) – 2:53
3. "Sugaree" (Garcia, Hunter) – 10:38
4. "New Minglewood Blues" (traditional, arranged by Grateful Dead) – 4:49
5. "Ramble On Rose" (Garcia, Hunter) – 7:01
6. "Looks Like Rain" (Weir, Barlow) – 7:40
7. "Loser" (Garcia, Hunter) – 7:40
8. "El Paso" (Robbins) – 4:35
9. "Scarlet Begonias" (Garcia, Hunter) – 11:54
10. "The Music Never Stopped" (Weir, Barlow) – 7:26

Disc 2

Second set:

1. "Samson and Delilah" (traditional, arranged by Grateful Dead) – 8:19
2. "It Must Have Been the Roses" (Hunter) – 6:55
3. "Playing in the Band" > (Weir, Hart, Hunter) – 9:44
4. "Drums" > (Hart, Kreutzmann) – 2:19

Disc 3

1. "The Wheel" > (Garcia, Kreutzmann, Hunter) – 10:42
2. "Good Lovin' " > (Rudy Clark, Arthur Resnick) – 8:07
3. "Comes a Time" > (Garcia, Hunter) – 9:53
4. "Dancing in the Street" > (Stevenson, Gaye, Hunter) – 8:24
5. "Not Fade Away" > (Hardin, Petty) – 13:56
6. "Dancing in the Street" > (Stevenson, Gaye, Hunter) – 4:04
7. "Around and Around" (Berry) – 7:12

=== April 25, 1977 – Capitol Theatre, Passaic, New Jersey ===
- Jerry Garcia, Donna Jean Godchaux, Keith Godchaux, Mickey Hart, Bill Kreutzmann, Phil Lesh, Bob Weir
- Recorded by Betty Cantor
- Also released in a separate edition, the second vinyl record breakout from the box

Disc 1

First set:

1. "New Minglewood Blues" (traditional, arranged by Grateful Dead) – 6:12
2. "Deal" (Garcia, Hunter) – 5:41
3. "Mama Tried" (Haggard) – 3:07
4. "They Love Each Other" (Garcia, Hunter) – 7:27
5. "Looks Like Rain" (Weir, Barlow) – 8:28
6. "Peggy-O" (traditional, arranged by Grateful Dead) – 9:17
7. "Lazy Lightnin' " > (Weir, Barlow) – 3:31
8. "Supplication" (Weir, Barlow) – 4:19
9. "Ship of Fools" (Garcia, Hunter) – 6:50
10. "Estimated Prophet" (Weir, Barlow) – 8:15
11. "Brown-Eyed Women" (Garcia, Hunter) – 6:05
12. "The Music Never Stopped" (Weir, Barlow) – 6:37

Disc 2

Second set:

1. "Scarlet Begonias" > (Garcia, Hunter) – 9:02
2. "Fire on the Mountain" > (Hart, Hunter) – 11:22
3. "Samson and Delilah" (traditional, arranged by Grateful Dead) – 7:52
4. "Terrapin Station" > (Garcia, Hunter) – 9:36
5. "Playing in the Band" > (Weir, Hart, Hunter) – 9:22
6. "Drums" > (Hart, Kreutzmann) – 4:01
7. "Wharf Rat" > (Garcia, Hunter) – 16:15
8. "Playing in the Band" (Weir, Hart, Hunter) – 5:00

Encore:

9. "U.S. Blues" (Garcia, Hunter) – 6:08

=== May 14, 1978 – Providence Civic Center, Providence, Rhode Island ===
- Jerry Garcia, Donna Jean Godchaux, Keith Godchaux, Mickey Hart, Bill Kreutzmann, Phil Lesh, Bob Weir
- Recorded by Betty Cantor

Disc 1

First set:

1. "Mississippi Half Step Uptown Toodeloo" (Garcia, Hunter) – 12:01
2. "Cassidy" (Weir, Barlow) – 5:44
3. "They Love Each Other" (Garcia, Hunter) – 7:08
4. "Looks Like Rain" (Weir, Barlow) – 8:32
5. "It Must Have Been the Roses" (Hunter) – 6:54
6. "Me and My Uncle" > (Phillips) – 2:59
7. "Big River" (Cash) – 6:30
8. "Brown-Eyed Women" (Garcia, Hunter) – 5:57
9. "Let It Grow" (Weir, Barlow) – 17:38

Disc 2

Second set:

1. "Samson and Delilah" (traditional, arranged by Grateful Dead) – 10:46
2. "Ship of Fools" (Garcia, Hunter) – 7:38
3. "Estimated Prophet" > (Weir, Barlow) – 13:53
4. "Eyes of the World" > (Garcia, Hunter) – 15:43
5. "Drums" > (Hart, Kreutzmann) – 12:32

Disc 3

1. "Not Fade Away" > (Hardin, Petty) – 15:40
2. "Goin' Down the Road Feeling Bad" > (traditional, arranged by Grateful Dead) – 7:51
3. "Around and Around" (Berry) – 8:48

Encore:

4. "U.S. Blues" (Garcia, Hunter) – 5:29

=== October 27, 1979 – Cape Cod Coliseum, South Yarmouth, Massachusetts ===
- Jerry Garcia, Mickey Hart, Bill Kreutzmann, Phil Lesh, Brent Mydland, Bob Weir
- Recorded by Dan Healy

Disc 1

First set:

1. "Jack Straw" (Garcia, Hunter) – 8:00
2. "Candyman" (Garcia, Hunter) – 7:35
3. "Me and My Uncle" > (Phillips) – 3:10
4. "Big River" (Cash) – 7:15
5. "Brown-Eyed Women" (Garcia, Hunter) – 5:51
6. "Easy to Love You" (Brent Mydland, Barlow) – 4:04
7. "New Minglewood Blues" (traditional, arranged by Grateful Dead) – 7:04
8. "Stagger Lee" (Garcia, Hunter) – 8:30
9. "Lost Sailor" > (Weir, Barlow) – 6:41
10. "Saint of Circumstance" > (Weir, Barlow) – 5:30
11. "Deal" (Garcia, Hunter) – 5:44

Disc 2

Second set:

1. "Dancing in the Street" > (Stevenson, Gaye, Hunter) – 14:23
2. "Franklin's Tower" (Garcia, Kreutzmann, Hunter) – 17:11

Disc 3

1. "He's Gone" > (Garcia, Hunter) – 14:00
2. "Caution Jam" > (Garcia, Hart, Kreutzmann, Lesh, Mydland, Weir) – 3:44
3. "The Other One" > (Weir, Kreutzmann) – 8:55
4. "Drums" > (Hart, Kreutzmann) – 6:30
5. "Not Fade Away" > (Hardin, Petty) – 9:13
6. "Black Peter" > (Garcia, Hunter) – 9:30
7. "Around and Around" (Berry) – 8:08

Encore:

8. "One More Saturday Night" (Weir) – 5:06

=== November 28, 1980 – Lakeland Civic Center, Lakeland, Florida ===
- Jerry Garcia, Mickey Hart, Bill Kreutzmann, Phil Lesh, Brent Mydland, Bob Weir
- Recorded by Dan Healy

Disc 1

First set:

1. "Jack Straw" (Weir, Hunter) – 6:04
2. "Peggy-O" (traditional, arranged by Grateful Dead) – 6:47
3. "Little Red Rooster" (Willie Dixon) – 9:35
4. "Tennessee Jed" (Garcia, Hunter) – 8:59
5. "Passenger" (Lesh, Peter Monk) – 5:00
6. "Deep Elem Blues" (traditional, arranged by Grateful Dead) – 5:07
7. "Looks Like Rain" (Weir, Barlow) – 8:03
8. "Deal" (Garcia, Hunter) – 6:41

Disc 2

Second set:

1. "Feel Like a Stranger" (Weir, Barlow) – 8:39
2. "To Lay Me Down" > (Garcia, Hunter) – 9:03
3. "Let It Grow" > (Weir, Barlow) – 11:17
4. "Terrapin Station" > (Garcia, Hunter) – 11:55
5. "Drums" > (Hart, Kreutzmann) – 10:20

Disc 3

1. "Space" > (Garcia, Hart, Kreutzmann, Lesh, Mydland, Weir) – 5:44
2. "Not Fade Away" > (Hardin, Petty) – 5:50
3. "Black Peter" > (Garcia, Hunter) – 9:27
4. "Sugar Magnolia" (Weir, Hunter) – 9:28

Encore:

5. "U.S. Blues" (Garcia, Hunter) – 5:21

=== May 16, 1981 – Barton Hall, Cornell University, Ithaca, New York ===
- Jerry Garcia, Mickey Hart, Bill Kreutzmann, Phil Lesh, Brent Mydland, Bob Weir
- Recorded by Dan Healy

Disc 1

First set:

1. "Feel Like a Stranger" (Weir, Barlow) – 9:09
2. "Friend of the Devil" (Garcia, Dawson, Hunter) – 9:21
3. "Me and My Uncle" > (Phillips) – 3:02
4. "Big River" (Cash) – 6:18
5. "Althea" > (Garcia, Hunter) – 8:54
6. "C.C. Rider" (traditional, arranged by Grateful Dead) – 7:53
7. "Brown-Eyed Women" (Garcia, Hunter) – 5:23
8. "Passenger" (Lesh, Monk) – 5:16
9. "High Time" > (Garcia, Hunter) – 8:07
10. "Let It Grow" > (Weir, Barlow) – 10:43
11. "Don't Ease Me In" (traditional, arranged by Grateful Dead) – 3:22

Disc 2

Second set:

1. "Shakedown Street" > (Garcia, Hunter) – 16:40
2. "Bertha" > (Garcia, Hunter) – 5:47
3. "Lost Sailor" > (Weir, Barlow) – 6:27
4. "Saint of Circumstance" > (Weir, Barlow) – 6:58

Disc 3

1. "Spanish Jam" > (Garcia, Hart, Kreutzmann, Lesh, Mydland, Weir) – 8:58
2. "Drums" > (Hart, Kreutzmann) – 10:52
3. "Jam" > (Garcia, Hart, Kreutzmann, Lesh, Mydland, Weir) – 3:16
4. "Truckin' " > (Garcia, Lesh, Weir, Hunter) – 6:01
5. "Nobody's Jam" > (Garcia, Hart, Kreutzmann, Lesh, Mydland, Weir) – 2:30
6. "Stella Blue" > (Garcia, Hunter) – 9:52
7. "Goin' Down the Road Feeling Bad" > (traditional, arranged by Grateful Dead) – 6:21
8. "One More Saturday Night" (Weir) – 4:42

Encore:

9. "Uncle John's Band" (Garcia, Hunter) – 9:26

=== July 31, 1982 – Manor Downs, Austin, Texas ===
- Jerry Garcia, Mickey Hart, Bill Kreutzmann, Phil Lesh, Brent Mydland, Bob Weir
- Recorded by Dan Healy

Disc 1

First set:

1. "Alabama Getaway" > (Garcia, Hunter) – 6:11
2. "Promised Land" (Berry) – 4:38
3. "Candyman" (Garcia, Hunter) – 6:54
4. "El Paso" (Robbins) – 5:03
5. "Bird Song" > (Garcia, Hunter) – 9:28
6. "Little Red Rooster" (Dixon) – 8:10
7. "Ramble On Rose" (Garcia, Hunter) – 7:23
8. "It's All Over Now" (Bobby Womack, Shirley Womack) – 9:07
9. "Brown-Eyed Women" > (Garcia, Hunter) – 5:47
10. "The Music Never Stopped" (Weir, Barlow) – 7:45
11. "Deal" (Garcia, Hunter) – 6:29

Disc 2

Second set:

1. "Scarlet Begonias" > (Garcia, Hunter) – 13:12
2. "Fire on the Mountain" > (Hart, Hunter) – 10:22
3. "Estimated Prophet" > (Weir, Barlow) – 11:20
4. "Eyes of the World" > (Garcia, Hunter) – 14:22
5. "Drums" > (Hart, Kreutzmann) – 8:14

Disc 3

1. "Space" > (Garcia, Lesh, Mydland, Weir) – 8:01
2. "Uncle John's Band" > (Garcia, Hunter) – 8:23
3. "Truckin' " > (Garcia, Lesh, Weir, Hunter) – 8:49
4. "Morning Dew" > (Dobson, Rose) – 10:57
5. "One More Saturday Night" (Weir) – 4:59

Encore

6. "Don't Ease Me In" (traditional, arranged by Grateful Dead) – 3:14

=== October 21, 1983 – The Centrum, Worcester, Massachusetts ===
- Jerry Garcia, Mickey Hart, Bill Kreutzmann, Phil Lesh, Brent Mydland, Bob Weir
- Recorded by Dan Healy

Disc 1

First set:

1. "The Music Never Stopped" (Weir, Barlow) – 9:33
2. "Loser" (Garcia, Hunter) – 7:02
3. "C.C. Rider" (traditional, arranged by Grateful Dead) – 9:07
4. "Cumberland Blues" (Garcia, Lesh, Hunter) – 7:46
5. "Cassidy" (Weir, Barlow) – 6:11
6. "Ramble On Rose" (Garcia, Hunter) – 7:34
7. "My Brother Esau" (Weir, Barlow) – 5:21
8. "Big Railroad Blues" > (Lewis) – 7:37
9. "Promised Land" (Berry) – 4:45

Disc 2

Second set:

1. "Scarlet Begonias" > (Garcia, Hunter) – 13:29
2. "Fire on the Mountain" (Hart, Hunter) – 19:05
3. "Uncle John's Band" > (Garcia, Hunter) – 8:23
4. "Playing in the Band" > (Weir, Hart, Hunter) – 11:29
5. "Drums" > (Hart, Kreutzmann) – 9:23

Disc 3

1. "Space" > (Garcia, Lesh, Mydland, Weir) – 15:19
2. "Truckin' " > (Garcia, Lesh, Weir, Hunter) – 7:57
3. "Wharf Rat" > (Garcia, Hunter) – 9:57
4. "I Need a Miracle > (Weir, Barlow) – 3:33
5. "Touch of Grey" (Garcia, Hunter) – 6:31

Encore:

1. "Johnny B. Goode" (Berry) – 4:11

=== October 12, 1984 – Augusta Civic Center, Augusta, Maine ===
- Jerry Garcia, Mickey Hart, Bill Kreutzmann, Phil Lesh, Brent Mydland, Bob Weir
- Recorded by Dan Healy

Disc 1

First set:

1. "Feel Like a Stranger" (Weir, Barlow) – 10:42
2. "It Must Have Been the Roses" (Hunter) – 6:21
3. "On the Road Again" (traditional, arranged by Grateful Dead) – 3:11
4. "Jack-a-Roe" (traditional, arranged by Grateful Dead) – 5:51
5. "It's All Over Now" (B. Womack, S. Womack) – 7:53
6. "Cumberland Blues" (Garcia, Lesh, Hunter) – 6:30
7. "The Music Never Stopped" (Weir, Barlow) – 8:55

Disc 2

Second set:

1. "Cold Rain and Snow" (traditional, arranged by Grateful Dead) – 7:15
2. "Lost Sailor" > (Weir, Barlow) – 6:43
3. "Saint Of Circumstance" > (Weir, Barlow) – 7:24
4. "Don't Need Love" > (Mydland) – 6:20
5. "Uncle John's Band" > (Garcia, Hunter) – 16:21
6. "Drums" > (Hart, Kreutzmann) – 11:01

Disc 3

1. "Space" > (Garcia, Lesh, Mydland, Weir) – 6:43
2. "Playing in the Band" > (Weir, Hart, Hunter) – 8:03
3. "Uncle John's Band" > (Garcia, Hunter) – 2:03
4. "Morning Dew" (Dobson, Rose) – 13:06

Encore:

5. "Good Lovin' " (Clark, Resnick) – 7:40

=== June 24, 1985 – Riverbend Music Center, Cincinnati, Ohio ===
- Jerry Garcia, Mickey Hart, Bill Kreutzmann, Phil Lesh, Brent Mydland, Bob Weir
- Recorded by Dan Healy

Disc 1

First set:

1. "Alabama Getaway" > (Garcia, Hunter) – 5:51
2. "Greatest Story Ever Told" (Weir, Hunter) – 4:21
3. "They Love Each Other" (Garcia, Hunter) – 8:26
4. "New Minglewood Blues" (traditional, arranged by Grateful Dead) – 8:37
5. "Tennessee Jed" (Garcia, Hunter) – 8:02
6. "My Brother Esau" (Weir, Barlow) – 5:19
7. "Loser" (Garcia, Hunter) – 7:25
8. "Let It Grow" (Weir, Barlow) – 12:31

Disc 2

Second set:

1. "Iko Iko" > (James Crawford, Barbara Hawkins, Rosa Hawkins, Joan Johnson) – 8:17
2. "Samson and Delilah" > (traditional, arranged by Grateful Dead) – 8:33
3. "He's Gone" > (Garcia, Hunter) – 10:04
4. "Smokestack Lightnin'" > (Chester Burnette) – 4:18
5. "Cryptical Envelopment" > (Garcia) – 1:48
6. "Drums" > (Hart, Kreutzmann) – 11:03

Disc 3

1. "Space" > (Garcia, Lesh, Mydland, Weir) – 7:50
2. "Comes a Time" > (Garcia, Hunter) – 5:53
3. "The Other One" > (Weir, Kreutzmann) – 5:09
4. "Cryptical Envelopment" > (Garcia) – 0:37
5. "Wharf Rat" > (Garcia, Hunter) – 8:37
6. "Around and Around" > (Berry) – 3:48
7. "Good Lovin' " (Clark, Resnick) – 8:52

Encore:

8. "U.S. Blues" (Garcia, Hunter) – 4:49

=== May 3, 1986 – Cal Expo Amphitheatre, Sacramento, California ===
- Jerry Garcia, Mickey Hart, Bill Kreutzmann, Phil Lesh, Brent Mydland, Bob Weir
- Recorded by Dan Healy

Disc 1

First set:

1. "Cold Rain and Snow" > (traditional, arranged by Grateful Dead) – 6:45
2. "The Race Is On" (Rollins) – 3:04
3. "They Love Each Other" (Garcia, Hunter) – 8:33
4. "C.C. Rider" (traditional, arranged by Grateful Dead) – 6:25
5. "High Time" (Garcia, Hunter) – 7:53
6. "Beat It On Down the Line" > (Fuller) – 2:58
7. "Promised Land" > (Berry) – 3:37
8. "Deal" (Garcia, Hunter) – 8:09

Second set:

9. "Scarlet Begonias" > (Garcia, Hunter) – 9:36
10. "Fire on the Mountain" (Hart, Hunter) – 9:35

Disc 2

1. "Man Smart, Woman Smarter" > (Norman Span) – 7:11
2. "Goin' Down the Road Feeling Bad" > (traditional, arranged by Grateful Dead) – 6:59
3. "Drums" > (Hart, Kreutzmann) – 14:49
4. "Space" > (Garcia, Lesh, Mydland, Weir) – 6:52
5. "The Other One" > (Weir, Kreutzmann) – 7:41
6. "Comes a Time" > (Garcia, Hunter) – 7:37
7. "Sugar Magnolia" (Weir, Hunter) – 10:45

=== September 18, 1987 – Madison Square Garden, New York ===
- Jerry Garcia, Mickey Hart, Bill Kreutzmann, Phil Lesh, Brent Mydland, Bob Weir
- Recorded by Dan Healy

Disc 1

First set:

1. "Hell in a Bucket" > (Weir, Barlow, Mydland) – 7:10
2. "Sugaree" > (Garcia, Hunter) – 10:29
3. "Walkin' Blues" (Robert Johnson, arranged by Weir) – 6:50
4. "Candyman" (Garcia, Hunter) – 6:51
5. "When I Paint My Masterpiece" (Bob Dylan) – 4:52
6. "Bird Song" (Garcia, Hunter) – 10:23

Second set:

7. "Shakedown Street" > (Garcia, Hunter) – 12:52
8. "Man Smart, Woman Smarter" > (Span) – 7:15

Disc 2

1. "Terrapin Station" > (Garcia, Hunter) – 13:29
2. "Drums" > (Hart, Kreutzmann) – 8:23
3. "Space" > (Garcia, Lesh, Hart, Hunter) – 7:59
4. "Goin' Down the Road Feeling Bad" > (traditional, arranged by Grateful Dead) – 6:05
5. "All Along the Watchtower" > (Dylan) – 4:50
6. "Morning Dew" > (Dobson, Rose) – 11:10
7. "Good Lovin' " > (Clark, Resnick) – 4:17
8. "La Bamba" > (Ritchie Valens) – 1:30
9. "Good Lovin' " (Clark, Resnick) – 4:21

Encore:

10. "Knockin' on Heaven's Door" (Dylan) – 9:03

=== July 3, 1988 – Oxford Plains Speedway, Oxford, Maine ===
- Jerry Garcia, Mickey Hart, Bill Kreutzmann, Phil Lesh, Brent Mydland, Bob Weir
- Recorded by Dan Healy

Disc 1

First set:

1. "Hell in a Bucket" > (Weir, Barlow) – 6:20
2. "Sugaree" (Garcia, Hunter) – 9:01
3. "Walkin' Blues" (Johnson, arranged by Weir) – 6:42
4. "Tennessee Jed" (Garcia, Hunter) – 8:22
5. "Queen Jane Approximately" (Dylan) – 6:33
6. "Bird Song" (Garcia, Hunter) – 11:46

Disc 2

Second set:

1. "Touch of Grey" (Garcia, Hunter) – 6:46
2. "Hey Pocky Way" (Joseph Modeliste, Arthur Neville, Leo Nocentelli, George Porter Jr.) – 6:10
3. "Looks Like Rain" (Weir, Barlow) – 9:56
4. "Estimated Prophet" > (Weir, Barlow) – 11:38
5. "Eyes of the World" > (Garcia, Hunter) – 8:14
6. "I Will Take You Home" > (Mydland, Barlow) – 3:56
7. "Drums" > (Hart, Kreutzmann) – 10:15

Disc 3

1. "Space" > (Garcia, Lesh, Mydland, Weir) – 7:55
2. "Goin' Down the Road Feeling Bad" > (traditional, arranged by Grateful Dead) 6:55
3. "I Need a Miracle" > (Weir, Barlow) – 3:36
4. "Dear Mr. Fantasy" > (Jim Capaldi, Steve Winwood, Chris Wood) – 5:18
5. "Hey Jude" (John Lennon, Paul McCartney) – 3:32

Encore:

6. "Not Fade Away" (Hardin, Petty) 11:24

=== October 26, 1989 – Miami Arena, Miami, Florida ===
- Jerry Garcia, Mickey Hart, Bill Kreutzmann, Phil Lesh, Brent Mydland, Bob Weir
- Recorded by John Cutler

Disc 1

First set:

1. "Foolish Heart" (Garcia, Hunter) – 9:07
2. "Little Red Rooster" (Dixon) – 9:08
3. "Stagger Lee" (Garcia, Hunter) – 6:29
4. "Me and My Uncle" > (Phillips) – 2:50
5. "Big River" (Cash) – 5:48
6. "Brown-Eyed Women" (Garcia, Hunter) – 6:01
7. "Victim or the Crime" > (Weir, Gerrit Graham) – 7:52
8. "Don't Ease Me In" (traditional, arranged by Grateful Dead) – 3:35

Disc 2

Second set:

1. "Estimated Prophet" > (Weir, Barlow) – 13:34
2. "Blow Away" (Mydland, Barlow) – 8:00
3. "Dark Star" > (Garcia, Hart, Kreutzmann, Lesh, McKernan, Weir, Hunter) – 29:46
4. "Drums" > (Hart, Kreutzmann) – 9:36

Disc 3

1. "Space" > (Garcia, Lesh, Mydland, Weir) – 6:33
2. "The Wheel" > (Garcia, Kreutzmann, Hunter) – 4:52
3. "All Along the Watchtower" > (Dylan) – 5:25
4. "Stella Blue" > (Garcia, Hunter) – 8:16
5. "Not Fade Away" (Hardin, Petty) – 12:15

Encore:

6. "And We Bid You Goodnight" (Traditional, arranged by Grateful Dead) – 2:45

=== October 27, 1990 – Le Zénith, Paris, France ===
- Jerry Garcia, Mickey Hart, Bill Kreutzmann, Phil Lesh, Bob Weir, Vince Welnick – featuring Bruce Hornsby
- Recorded by Dan Healy

Disc 1

First set:

1. "Hell in a Bucket" > (Weir, Barlow) – 6:21
2. "Sugaree" (Garcia, Hunter) – 11:47
3. "New Minglewood Blues" (traditional, arranged by Grateful Dead) – 7:31
4. "Jack-a-Roe" (traditional, arranged by Grateful Dead) – 5:12
5. "Black-Throated Wind" (Weir, Barlow) – 6:20
6. "Ramble On Rose" (Garcia, Hunter) – 7:39
7. "When I Paint My Masterpiece" (Dylan) – 5:09
8. "Bird Song" > (Garcia, Hunter) – 11:53
9. "Promised Land" (Berry) – 4:51

Disc 2

Second set:

1. "China Cat Sunflower" > (Garcia, Hunter) – 6:57
2. "I Know You Rider" (traditional, arranged by Grateful Dead) – 7:06
3. "Saint of Circumstance" > (Weir, Barlow) – 6:25
4. "Crazy Fingers" > (Garcia, Hunter) – 9:25
5. "Playing in the Band" > (Weir, Hart, Hunter) – 10:45
6. "Drums" > (Hart, Kreutzmann) – 10:05

Disc 3

1. "Space" > (Garcia, Lesh, Weir) – 11:43
2. "Playing in the Band" > (Weir, Hart, Hunter) – 2:28
3. "Stella Blue" > (Garcia, Hunter) – 9:14
4. "Throwing Stones" > (Weir, Barlow) – 10:14
5. "Not Fade Away" (Hardin, Petty) – 10:13

Encore:

6. "One More Saturday Night" (Weir) – 5:18

=== September 10, 1991 – Madison Square Garden, New York ===
- Jerry Garcia, Mickey Hart, Bill Kreutzmann, Phil Lesh, Bob Weir, Vince Welnick – featuring Bruce Hornsby and Branford Marsalis
- Recorded by Dan Healy

Disc 1

First set:

1. "Shakedown Street" > (Garcia, Hunter) – 14:04
2. "C.C. Rider" > (traditional, arranged by Grateful Dead) – 5:45
3. "It Takes a Lot to Laugh, It Takes a Train to Cry" (Dylan) – 4:59
4. "Black-Throated Wind" (Weir, Barlow) – 6:19
5. "High Time" (Garcia, Hunter) – 7:43
6. "Cassidy" (Weir, Barlow) – 7:29
7. "Deal" (Garcia, Hunter) – 9:29

Disc 2

Second set:

1. "Help on the Way" > (Garcia, Hunter) – 4:11
2. "Slipknot!" > (Garcia, K. Godchaux, Kreutzmann, Lesh, Weir) – 7:26
3. "Franklin's Tower" (Garcia, Hunter) – 10:19
4. "Estimated Prophet" > (Weir, Barlow) – 13:04
5. "Dark Star" > (Garcia, Hart, Kreutzmann, Lesh, McKernan, Weir, Hunter) – 12:25
6. "Drums" > (Hart, Kreutzmann) – 4:56

Disc 3

1. "Space" > (Garcia, Lesh, Weir, Welnick) – 8:19
2. "Dark Star" > (Garcia, Hart, Kreutzmann, Lesh, McKernan, Weir, Hunter) – 12:17
3. "I Need a Miracle" > (Weir, Barlow) – 4:15
4. "Standing on the Moon" > (Garcia, Hunter) – 9:02
5. "Turn On Your Lovelight" (Scott, Malone) – 7:50

Encore:

6. "It's All Over Now, Baby Blue" (Dylan) – 6:48

=== March 20, 1992 – Copps Coliseum, Hamilton, Ontario ===
- Jerry Garcia, Mickey Hart, Bill Kreutzmann, Phil Lesh, Bob Weir, Vince Welnick – featuring Bruce Hornsby
- Recorded by Dan Healy

Disc 1

First set:

1. "Hell in a Bucket" (Weir, Barlow) – 6:48
2. "Althea" (Garcia, Hunter) – 7:31
3. "The Same Thing" (Dixon) – 8:33
4. "Brown-Eyed Women" (Garcia, Hunter) – 5:49
5. "Mexicali Blues" > (Weir, Barlow) – 4:40
6. "Maggie's Farm" (Dylan) – 8:22
7. "Bird Song" (Garcia, Hunter) – 12:21
8. "Promised Land" (Berry) – 4:51

Disc 2

Second set:

1. "Shakedown Street" (Garcia, Hunter) – 13:12
2. "Man Smart, Woman Smarter" (Span) – 10:04
3. "Dark Star" > (Garcia, Hart, Kreutzmann, Lesh, McKernan, Weir, Hunter) – 14:16
4. "Drums" > (Hart, Kreutzmann) – 9:50

Disc 3

1. "Space" > (Garcia, Lesh, Weir, Welnick) – 11:07
2. "The Other One" > (Weir, Kreutzmann) – 9:26
3. "Standing on the Moon" > (Garcia, Hunter) – 9:53
4. "Turn On Your Lovelight" (Scott, Malone) – 7:48

Encore:

5. "U.S. Blues" (Garcia, Hunter) – 5:26

=== March 27, 1993 – Knickerbocker Arena, Albany, New York ===
- Jerry Garcia, Mickey Hart, Bill Kreutzmann, Phil Lesh, Bob Weir, Vince Welnick
- Recorded by Dan Healy

Disc 1

First set:

1. "Hell in a Bucket" (Weir, Barlow) – 6:34
2. "Bertha" (Garcia, Hunter) – 6:54
3. "The Same Thing" (Dixon) – 7:36
4. "Peggy-O" (Traditional, arranged by Grateful Dead) – 5:54
5. "Queen Jane Approximately" (Dylan) – 6:11
6. "Broken Arrow" (Robbie Robertson) – 6:08
7. "Loose Lucy" (Garcia, Hunter) – 7:05
8. "Cassidy" (Weir, Barlow) – 7:07
9. "Casey Jones" (Garcia, Hunter) – 5:46

Disc 2

Second set:

1. "Eyes of the World" > (Garcia, Hunter) – 12:12
2. "Estimated Prophet" > (Weir, Barlow) – 11:45
3. "Comes a Time" > (Garcia, Hunter) – 6:44
4. "Corrina" > (Weir, Hart, Hunter) – 10:23
5. "Drums" > (Hart, Kreutzmann) – 12:57

Disc 3

1. "Space" > (Garcia, Lesh, Weir, Welnick) – 9:08
2. "The Wheel" > (Garcia, Kreutzmann, Hunter) – 4:22
3. "All Along the Watchtower" > (Dylan) – 5:50
4. "Days Between" > (Garcia, Hunter) – 9:49
5. "One More Saturday Night" (Weir) – 5:11

Encore:

6. "I Fought the Law" (Sonny Curtis) – 2:48

=== October 1, 1994 – Boston Garden, Boston, Massachusetts ===
- Jerry Garcia, Mickey Hart, Bill Kreutzmann, Phil Lesh, Bob Weir, Vince Welnick
- Recorded by John Cutler

Disc 1

First set:

1. "Help on the Way" > (Garcia, Hunter) – 4:23
2. "Slipknot!" > (Garcia, K. Godchaux, Kreutzmann, Lesh, Weir) – 5:00
3. "Franklin's Tower" (Garcia, Hunter) – 11:37
4. "Walkin' Blues" (Johnson, arranged by Weir) – 5:51
5. "Althea" (Garcia, Hunter) – 8:28
6. "Me and My Uncle" > (Phillips) – 2:49
7. "Big River" (Cash) – 6:01
8. "Just Like Tom Thumb's Blues" (Dylan) – 5:58
9. "So Many Roads" > (Garcia, Hunter) – 7:23
10. "Promised Land" (Berry) – 4:41

Disc 2

Second set:

1. "Scarlet Begonias" > (Garcia, Hunter) – 11:30
2. "Fire on the Mountain" (Hart, Hunter) – 16:23
3. "Way to Go Home" (Welnick, Hunter) – 6:42
4. "Saint of Circumstance" > (Weir, Barlow) – 7:51
5. "Terrapin Station" > (Garcia, Hunter) – 16:22
6. "Drums" > (Hart, Kreutzmann) – 12:01

Disc 3

1. "Space" > (Garcia, Lesh, Weir, Welnick) – 18:19
2. "The Last Time" > (Mick Jagger, Keith Richards) – 6:01
3. "Stella Blue" > (Garcia, Hunter) – 11:19
4. "One More Saturday Night" (Weir) – 5:08

Encore:

5. "Liberty" (Garcia, Hunter) – 7:58

=== February 21, 1995 – Delta Center, Salt Lake City, Utah ===
- Jerry Garcia, Mickey Hart, Bill Kreutzmann, Phil Lesh, Bob Weir, Vince Welnick
- Recorded by John Cutler

Disc 1

First set:

1. "Salt Lake City" (Weir, Barlow) – 4:56
2. "Friend of the Devil" (Garcia, Hunter) – 7:54
3. "Wang Dang Doodle" (Dixon) – 6:30
4. "Tennessee Jed" (Garcia, Hunter) – 7:57
5. "Broken Arrow" (Robertson) – 5:53
6. "Black-Throated Wind" (Weir, Barlow) – 6:12
7. "So Many Roads" (Garcia, Hunter) – 8:10
8. "The Music Never Stopped" (Weir, Barlow) – 9:02

Disc 2

Second set:

1. "Foolish Heart" (Garcia, Hunter) – 10:39
2. "Samba in the Rain" (Welnick, Hunter) – 7:13
3. "Truckin' " > (Garcia, Lesh, Weir, Hunter) – 8:32
4. "I Just Want to Make Love to You" > (Dixon) – 3:48
5. "That Would Be Something" > (McCartney) – 3:40
6. "Drums" > (Hart, Kreutzmann) – 11:25

Disc 3

1. "Space" > (Garcia, Lesh, Weir, Welnick) – 11:17
2. "Visions of Johanna" > (Dylan) – 10:11
3. "Sugar Magnolia" (Weir, Hunter) – 9:59

Encore:

4. "Liberty" (Garcia, Hunter) – 7:01
