= Shrine Exposition Hall, Los Angeles, CA 11/10/1967 =

Live album by Grateful Dead
- Released: January 22, 2016
- Recorded: November 10, 1967
- Venue: Shrine Exposition Hall, Los Angeles
- Genre: Rock
- Label: Rhino
- Producer: Grateful Dead

Grateful Dead chronology
Dave's Picks Volume 16 (2015)	Shrine Exposition Hall, Los Angeles, CA 11/10/1967 (2016)	Dave's Picks Volume 17 (2016)

Shrine Exposition Hall, Los Angeles, CA 11/10/1967 is a live album by the rock band the Grateful Dead. A three-disc vinyl LP, it contains the complete concert recorded on November 10, 1967 at the Shrine Exposition Hall in Los Angeles, California. It was released by Rhino Records in January 2016, in a limited edition of 6,700 copies. The concert was recorded on an 8-track multitrack recorder and was mixed down to stereo for the album.

The same concert recording was also released as part of the 30 Trips Around the Sun box set in October 2015.

== Track listing ==
Side 1

1. "Viola Lee Blues" (Noah Lewis) – 15:58
2. "It Hurts Me Too" (Elmore James, Marshall Sehorn) – 4:18

Side 2

1. "Beat It On Down the Line" (Jesse Fuller) – 3:50
2. "Morning Dew" (Bonnie Dobson, Tim Rose) – 7:39
3. "Good Morning Little Schoolgirl" (Sonny Boy Williamson) – 10:55

Side 3

1. "That's It for the Other One" – 12:04
  - "Cryptical Envelopment" (Jerry Garcia)
  - "The Other One" (Bob Weir, Bill Kreutzmann)
  - "Cryptical Envelopment" reprise (Garcia)

Side 4

1. "New Potato Caboose" (Phil Lesh, Robert Petersen) – 11:36

Side 5

1. "Alligator" (Lesh, Ron McKernan, Robert Hunter) – 11:01
2. "Caution (Do Not Stop on Tracks)" part 1 (Grateful Dead) – 4:15

Side 6

1. "Caution (Do Not Stop on Tracks)" part 2 (Grateful Dead) – 20:31

== Personnel ==
Grateful Dead

- Jerry Garcia – guitar, vocals
- Mickey Hart – drums
- Bill Kreutzmann – drums
- Phil Lesh – bass, vocals
- Ron "Pigpen" McKernan – organ, harmonica, percussion, vocals
- Bob Weir – guitar, vocals

Production

- Produced by Grateful Dead
- Produced for release by David Lemieux
- Recording: Dan Healy
- Mixing: Jeffrey Norman
- Mastering: Jeffrey Norman, David Glasser
