= Dave's Picks Volume 27 =

Live album by Grateful Dead
- Released: July 27, 2018
- Recorded: September 2, 1983
- Venue: Boise State University Pavilion
- Genre: Rock
- Length: 182:10
- Label: Rhino
- Producer: Grateful Dead

Grateful Dead chronology
Dave's Picks Volume 26 (2018)	Dave's Picks Volume 27 (2018)	Pacific Northwest '73–'74: The Complete Recordings (2018)

Dave's Picks Volume 27 is a three-CD live album by the rock band the Grateful Dead. It contains the complete concert recorded on September 2, 1983, at Boise State University Pavilion, in Boise, Idaho. It was produced as a limited edition of 18,000 copies and was released on July 27, 2018.

== Critical reception ==
In Glide Magazine, Doug Collette wrote, "As archivist David Lemieux recounts with his usual erudite and passionate liner notes, this is the first release from this period in the vault series, presenting proof positive that the iconic band could be absolutely brilliant, even at this juncture, on the cusp of a comparatively fallow period in its career. Implicit in the selection of this complete show at Boise State University is the crucial importance of Brent Mydland's contributions to the ensemble..."

On jambands.com, Kristopher Weiss said, "As it goes, Volume 27 presents a good – not superior – Grateful Dead show, famous in part because it represents the band's only concert in Idaho and kicks off with Phil Lesh's on-mic admonishment, "Citizens of Boise, submit or perish – you are a conquered people" as the band launches an early version of Willie Dixon's "Wang Dang Doodle".... Hot moments notwithstanding, 9/2/83 is not the show with which to turn friends on to the magic of the Grateful Dead."

== Track listing ==
Disc 1

First set:

1. "Wang Dang Doodle" > (Willie Dixon) – 6:27
2. "Jack Straw" (Bob Weir, Robert Hunter) – 5:47
3. "They Love Each Other" (Jerry Garcia, Hunter) – 7:48
4. "Mama Tried" > (Merle Haggard) – 2:43
5. "Big River" (Johnny Cash) – 6:25
6. "Brown-Eyed Women" (Garcia, Hunter) – 5:50
7. "New Minglewood Blues" (traditional, arranged by Grateful Dead) – 8:15
8. "Big Railroad Blues" (Noah Lewis) – 7:33
9. "Looks Like Rain" > (Weir, John Perry Barlow) – 10:51
10. "Deal" (Garcia, Hunter) – 9:53

Disc 2

Second set:

1. "Help on the Way" > (Garcia, Hunter) – 4:04
2. "Slipknot!" > (Garcia, Keith Godchaux, Bill Kreutzmann, Phil Lesh, Weir) – 7:26
3. "Franklin's Tower" (Garcia, Kreutzmann, Hunter) – 14:12
4. "Estimated Prophet" > (Weir, Barlow) – 12:53
5. "Eyes of the World" > (Garcia, Hunter) – 12:10
6. "Jam" > (Grateful Dead) – 3:22
7. "Drums" (Mickey Hart, Kreutzmann) – 5:50

Disc 3

1. "Space" > (Garcia, Lesh, Weir) – 10:06
2. "Throwing Stones" > (Weir, Barlow) – 7:49
3. "Goin' Down the Road Feeling Bad" > (traditional, arranged by Grateful Dead) – 7:50
4. "Black Peter" > (Garcia, Hunter) – 8:10
5. "Sugar Magnolia" (Weir, Hunter) – 9:17

Encore:

6. "It's All Over Now, Baby Blue" (Bob Dylan) – 7:25

== Personnel ==
Grateful Dead

- Jerry Garcia – guitar, vocals
- Mickey Hart – drums
- Bill Kreutzmann – drums
- Phil Lesh – bass, vocals
- Brent Mydland – keyboards, vocals
- Bob Weir – guitar, vocals

Production

- Produced by Grateful Dead
- Produced for release by David Lemieux
- Associate Producers: Doran Tyson & Ivette Ramos
- Mastering: Jeffrey Norman
- Recording: Dan Healy
- Art direction, design: Steve Vance
- Cover art: Tim McDonagh
- Photos: Bob Minkin
- Liner notes: David Lemieux
- Executive producer: Mark Pinkus

== Charts ==
Chart (2018)	Peak position
US Billboard 200	29
US Top Rock Albums (Billboard)	5
