= Dave's Picks Volume 16 =

Live album by Grateful Dead
- Released: November 1, 2015
- Recorded: March 28, 1973
- Venue: Springfield Civic Center
- Genre: Rock
- Length: 210:22
- Label: Rhino
- Producer: Grateful Dead

Grateful Dead chronology
30 Trips Around the Sun (2015)	Dave's Picks Volume 16 (2015)	Shrine Exposition Hall, Los Angeles, CA 11/10/1967 (2016)

Dave's Picks Volume 16 is a three-CD live album by the rock band the Grateful Dead. It contains the complete concert recorded on March 28, 1973 at the Springfield Civic Center in Springfield, Massachusetts. It was produced as a limited edition of 16,500 numbered copies, and was released on November 1, 2015.

Dave's Picks Volume 16 was the first release by the Grateful Dead to feature singer Donna Godchaux's rendition of Loretta Lynn's "You Ain't Woman Enough", a country song performed just 15 times by the band, all in 1973. Another album that includes Godchaux singing this tune is Worcester, MA, 4/4/73, a live archival release by the New Riders of the Purple Sage.

== Track listing ==
Disc 1
First set:

1. "Cumberland Blues" (Jerry Garcia, Phil Lesh, Robert Hunter) – 6:08
2. "Here Comes Sunshine" (Garcia, Hunter) – 8:47
3. "Mexicali Blues" (Bob Weir, John Barlow) – 3:42
4. "Wave That Flag" (Garcia, Hunter) – 5:39 (Note: Previously released as a bonus track on From the Mars Hotel)
5. "Beat It On Down the Line" (Jesse Fuller) – 3:25
6. "Loser" (Garcia, Hunter) – 7:09
7. "Jack Straw" (Weir, Hunter) – 4:59
8. "Box of Rain" (Lesh, Hunter) – 4:57
9. "They Love Each Other" (Garcia, Hunter) – 6:03
10. "El Paso" (Marty Robbins) – 4:50
11. "Row Jimmy" (Garcia, Hunter) – 8:41
12. "Around and Around" (Chuck Berry) – 5:24
13. "Brown-Eyed Women" (Garcia, Hunter) – 5:13

Disc 2

1. "You Ain't Woman Enough" (Loretta Lynn) – 5:17
2. "Looks Like Rain" (Weir, Barlow) – 7:36
3. "China Cat Sunflower" > (Garcia, Hunter) – 8:54
4. "I Know You Rider" (traditional, arranged by Grateful Dead) – 5:19

Second set:

5. "Promised Land" (Berry) – 3:12
6. "Loose Lucy" (Garcia, Hunter) – 7:04
7. "Me and My Uncle" (John Phillips) – 4:12
8. "Don't Ease Me In" (traditional, arranged by Grateful Dead) – 3:23
9. "The Race Is On" (Don Rollins) – 3:13
10. "Stella Blue" (Garcia, Hunter) – 7:34
11. "Big River" (Johnny Cash) – 4:38
12. "Mississippi Half-Step Uptown Toodeloo" (Garcia, Hunter) – 7:51

Disc 3

1. "Weather Report Suite Prelude" > (Weir) – 3:09
2. "Dark Star" > (Garcia, Mickey Hart, Bill Kreutzmann, Lesh, Ron McKernan, Weir, Hunter) – 31:46
3. "Eyes of the World" > (Garcia, Hunter) – 12:51
4. "Playing in the Band" (Weir, Hart, Hunter) – 15:27
5. "Johnny B. Goode" (Berry) – 3:51

== Personnel ==
=== Grateful Dead ===
- Jerry Garcia – guitar, vocals
- Donna Jean Godchaux – vocals
- Keith Godchaux – keyboards
- Bill Kreutzmann – drums
- Phil Lesh – bass, vocals
- Bob Weir – guitar, vocals

=== Production ===
- Produced by Grateful Dead
- Produced for release by David Lemieux
- Executive producer: Mark Pinkus
- Associate producers: Doran Tyson, Ivette Ramos
- CD mastering: Jeffrey Norman
- Recording: Kidd Candelario
- Art direction, design: Steve Vance
- Cover art: Micah Nelson
- Photos: E.E. Stern, Rich "The Fish" Weiner
- Tape research: Michael Wesley Johnson
- Archival research: Nicholas Meriwether

== Charts ==
Chart (2015)	Peak position
US Billboard 200	34
