= Dave's Picks Volume 29 =

Live album by Grateful Dead
- Released: February 1, 2019
- Recorded: February 26, 1977
- Venue: Swing Auditorium; San Bernardino, California
- Genre: Rock
- Length: 197:51
- Label: Rhino (R2-573507)
- Producer: Grateful Dead

Grateful Dead chronology
Playing in the Band, Seattle, Washington, 5/21/74 (2018)	Dave's Picks Volume 29 (2019)	The Warfield, San Francisco, California, October 9 & 10, 1980 (2019)

Dave's Picks Volume 29 is a three-CD live album by the rock band the Grateful Dead. It contains the complete concert recorded on February 26, 1977 at Swing Auditorium in San Bernardino, California, and three bonus tracks from February 27, 1977. It was produced as a limited edition of 20,000 copies, and released on February 1, 2019.

This concert featured the band's first live performances of the songs "Terrapin Station" and "Estimated Prophet".

The album cover depicts a skeleton couple who are walking towards Swing Auditorium. In the background is the San Bernardino landmark known as the Arrowhead.

== Critical reception ==
On AllMusic, Timothy Monger wrote, "Having returned from a hiatus the year before with a renewed vigor, 1977 would prove to be a banner year for the Dead in terms of the energy and quality of their performances, and this oft-bootlegged classic kicked it all off."

== Track listing ==
Disc 1

First set:

1. "Terrapin Station" (Garcia, Hunter) – 12:25
2. "New Minglewood Blues" (traditional, arranged by Grateful Dead) – 5:27
3. "They Love Each Other" (Garcia, Hunter) – 7:12
4. "Estimated Prophet" (Weir, Barlow) – 7:46*
5. "Sugaree" (Garcia, Hunter) – 11:44
6. "Mama Tried" → (Merle Haggard) – 3:04
7. "Deal" (Garcia, Hunter) – 6:07
8. "Playing in the Band" → (Weir, Hart, Hunter) – 13:46
9. "The Wheel" → (Garcia, Kreutzmann, Hunter) – 5:29
10. "Playing in the Band" (Weir, Hart, Hunter) – 5:10

Disc 2

Second set:

1. "Samson and Delilah" (traditional, arranged by Weir) – 7:23
2. "Tennessee Jed" (Garcia, Hunter) – 9:12
3. "The Music Never Stopped" (Weir, Barlow) – 6:58
4. "Help on the Way" → (Garcia, Hunter) – 5:44
5. "Slipknot!" → (Garcia, Godchaux, Kreutzmann, Lesh, Weir) – 7:31
6. "Franklin's Tower" (Garcia, Hunter, Kreutzmann) – 13:37
7. "Promised Land" (Chuck Berry) – 5:03

Disc 3

Second set, continued:

1. "Eyes of the World" → (Garcia, Hunter) – 12:09
2. "Dancing in the Street" → (William "Mickey" Stevenson, Marvin Gaye, Ivy Jo Hunter) – 9:46
3. "Around and Around" (Chuck Berry) – 7:50

Encore:

4. "U.S. Blues" (Garcia, Hunter) – 6:17

February 27, 1977 – Robertson Gym, University Of California, Santa Barbara, California:

5. "Morning Dew" (Bonnie Dobson, Tim Rose) – 13:58
6. "Sugar Magnolia" (Weir, Hunter) – 9:45
7. "Johnny B. Goode" (Chuck Berry) – 4:23
- First 10 seconds of "Estimated Prophet" are missing from the master tape. They are patched from a different performance, likely adjusted for speed.

== Personnel ==
Grateful Dead

- Jerry Garcia – guitar, vocals
- Donna Jean Godchaux – vocals
- Keith Godchaux – keyboards
- Mickey Hart – drums
- Bill Kreutzmann – drums
- Phil Lesh – bass
- Bob Weir – guitar, vocals

Production

- Produced by Grateful Dead
- Produced for release by David Lemieux
- Executive Producer: Mark Pinkus
- Associate Producers: Doran Tyson and Lisa Allen
- CD Mastering: Jeffrey Norman
- Recording: Betty Cantor-Jackson
- Art direction, design: Steve Vance
- Cover art: Tyler Crook
- Tape Research: Michael Wesley Johnson
- Liner notes: David Lemieux
- Tapes provided with assistance of ABCD Enterprises, LLC

== Charts ==
Chart (2019)	Peak position
US Billboard 200	26
US Top Rock Albums (Billboard)	2
