= Dave's Picks Volume 28 =

Live album by Grateful Dead
- Released: October 26, 2018
- Recorded: June 17, 1976
- Venues: Capitol Theatre; Passaic, New Jersey
- Genre: Rock
- Length: 193:18
- Labels: Rhino (R2-565022)
- Producer: Grateful Dead

Grateful Dead chronology
Portland Memorial Coliseum, Portland, OR, 5/19/74 (2018)	Dave's Picks Volume 28 (2018)	Playing in the Band, Seattle, Washington, 5/21/74 (2018)

Dave's Picks Volume 28 is a three-CD live album by the rock band the Grateful Dead. It contains the complete concert recorded on June 17, 1976, at Capitol Theatre, in Passaic, New Jersey and two bonus tracks from June 23, 1976 and June 28, 1976. It was produced as a limited edition of 18,000 copies, and released on October 26, 2018. The show from the next date was released in 2005 on Grateful Dead Download Series Volume 4.

== Critical reception ==
On AllMusic, Timothy Monger wrote, "The three-disc set is loaded with highlights of their mid-'70s era, including strong "Help on the Way" / "Slipknot!" / "Franklin's Tower" and "Let It Grow" / "Wharf Rat" / "Around and Around" medleys."

== Track listing ==
Disc 1

First set:

1. "Cold Rain and Snow" (traditional, arranged by Grateful Dead) – 7:17
2. "Big River" (Johnny Cash) – 6:43
3. "They Love Each Other" (Jerry Garcia, Robert Hunter) – 7:37
4. "Cassidy" (Bob Weir, John Perry Barlow) – 4:55
5. "Tennessee Jed" (Garcia, Hunter) – 10:08
6. "Looks Like Rain" > (Weir, Barlow) – 8:34
7. "Row Jimmy" (Garcia, Hunter) – 10:12
8. "The Music Never Stopped" (Weir, Barlow) – 6:29
9. "Scarlet Begonias" (Garcia, Hunter) – 11:06
10. "Promised Land" (Chuck Berry) – 3:59

Disc 2

Second set:

1. "Help on the Way" > (Garcia, Hunter) – 5:35
2. "Slipknot!" > (Garcia, Keith Godchaux, Bill Kreutzmann, Phil Lesh, Weir) – 8:02
3. "Franklin's Tower" > (Hunter, Garcia, Kreutzmann) – 11:10
4. "Dancing in the Street" > ( William "Mickey" Stevenson, Marvin Gaye, Ivy Jo Hunter) – 11:47
5. "Samson and Delilah" (traditional, arranged by Grateful Dead) – 6:17
6. "Ship Of Fools" (Garcia, Hunter) – 7:41

Disc 3

1. "Lazy Lightning" > (Weir, Barlow) – 3:02
2. "Supplication" (Weir, Barlow) – 5:15
3. "Friend of the Devil" (Garcia, Hunter) – 8:54
4. "Let It Grow" > (Weir, Barlow) – 6:12
5. "Drums" > (Mickey Hart, Kreutzmann) – 2:38
6. "Let It Grow" > (Weir, Barlow) – 2:31
7. "Wharf Rat" > (Garcia, Hunter) – 11:20
8. "Around and Around" (Berry) – 7:22

June 23, 1976 – Tower Theatre, Upper Darby, Pennsylvania:

9. "Sugaree" (Garcia, Hunter) – 9:09

June 28, 1976 – Auditorium Theatre, Chicago, Illinois:

10. "High Time" (Garcia, Hunter) – 9:17 (previously released on Grateful Dead Download Series Volume 4)

== Personnel ==
Grateful Dead

- Jerry Garcia – guitar, vocals
- Donna Jean Godchaux – vocals
- Keith Godchaux – keyboards
- Mickey Hart – drums
- Bill Kreutzmann – drums
- Phil Lesh – bass
- Bob Weir – guitar, vocals

Production

- Produced by Grateful Dead
- Produced for release by David Lemieux
- Associate Producers: Doran Tyson & Ivette Ramos
- Mastering: Jeffrey Norman
- Recording: Betty Cantor-Jackson
- Art direction, design: Steve Vance
- Cover art: Tim McDonagh
- Liner notes: David Lemieux
- Tapes provided through the assistance of ABCD Enterprises, LLC

== Charts ==
Chart (2018)	Chart position
US Billboard 200	35
US Top Rock Albums (Billboard)	5
