= Grateful Dead Download Series Volume 4 =

Live album by Grateful Dead
- Released: August 2, 2005
- Recorded: June 18, 1976
- Length: 209:45
- Label: Grateful Dead Productions

Grateful Dead chronology
Truckin' Up to Buffalo (2005)	Grateful Dead; Download Series Volume 4 (2005)	Grateful Dead Download Series Volume 5 (2005)

Download Series Volume 4 is a live album by the rock band Grateful Dead. It was released as a digital download on August 2, 2005, and is a three disc set featuring virtually all of the June 18, 1976 show from the Capitol Theatre in Passaic, New Jersey. The song "Tennessee Jed" was omitted due to technical problems on the master tape that could not be resolved during mastering. To compensate for this omission, the third disc includes highlights from concerts later in June 1976 in Philadelphia and Chicago.

June 1976 marked the beginning of a near non-stop touring circuit by the Grateful Dead that would last until the band's dissolution in 1995 following Jerry Garcia's passing. This period also saw the return of Mickey Hart as the second drummer, ending his five-year hiatus. In mid-June, the band performed three consecutive nights at the Capitol Theatre.

New songs for 1976 included "The Music Never Stopped", "Crazy Fingers", "Samson and Delilah", and "The Wheel". The show also featured one of only five Grateful Dead performances of Garcia's song "Mission In The Rain".

Volume 4 was mastered in HDCD by Jeffrey Norman.

== Critical reception ==
Professional ratings
Review scores
Source	Rating
Allmusic	2.5/5 stars

Stephen Thomas Erlewine wrote on AllMusic, "Nearly all of the Passaic show is here, running 20 tracks over the equivalent of two discs, while the excerpts from the Philadelphia show run nine tracks, all containing songs unplayed in Jersey. This includes a rather epic "Playing in the Band" – 23 minutes that lead into "Drums" and "The Wheel" before returning for a three-minute reprise of "Playing". Such bravura jams are largely absent on the low-energy Passaic show... [which] is generally a lazy stroll through a fairly familiar set list; pleasant, but not especially memorable."

== Track listing ==
Disc one

First set:

1. "The Music Never Stopped" (John Barlow, Bob Weir) - 5:54
2. "Sugaree" (Robert Hunter, Jerry Garcia) - 11:02
3. "Mama Tried" (Merle Haggard) - 3:06
4. "Crazy Fingers" (Hunter, Garcia) - 13:07
5. "Big River" (Johnny Cash) - 6:22
6. "Brown-Eyed Women" (Hunter, Garcia) - 4:49
7. "Looks Like Rain" (Barlow, Weir) - 7:57
8. "Row Jimmy" (Hunter, Garcia) - 10:28
9. "Cassidy" (Barlow, Weir) - 4:45
10. "Mission In the Rain" (Hunter, Garcia) - 7:44
11. "Promised Land" (Chuck Berry) - 4:18

Disc two

Second set:

1. "Samson and Delilah" (trad., arr. Grateful Dead) - 6:44
2. "St. Stephen" > (Hunter, Garcia, Phil Lesh) - 4:39
3. "Not Fade Away" > (Buddy Holly, Norman Petty) - 11:16
4. "St. Stephen" > (Hunter, Garcia, Lesh) - 1:02
5. "Eyes of the World" > (Hunter, Garcia) - 12:31
6. "Drums" > (Mickey Hart, Bill Kreutzmann) - 2:16
7. "The Wheel" > (Hunter, Garcia) - 4:42
8. "Sugar Magnolia" (Hunter, Weir) - 11:42

Encore:

9. "U.S. Blues" (Hunter, Garcia) - 5:50

Disc three

Bonus tracks:

1. "Scarlet Begonias" (6/21/76 Tower Theatre, Philadelphia, PA) - 10:59
2. "Lazy Lightnin' " > (6/21/76 Tower Theatre, Philadelphia, PA) - 2:48
3. "Supplication" (6/21/76 Tower Theatre, Philadelphia, PA) - 5:18
4. "Candyman" (6/21/76 Tower Theatre, Philadelphia, PA) - 7:03
5. "Playing In the Band" > (6/22/76 Tower Theatre, Philadelphia, PA) - 23:25
6. "Drums" > (6/22/76 Tower Theatre, Philadelphia, PA) - 2:30
7. "The Wheel" > (6/22/76 Tower Theatre, Philadelphia, PA) - 4:59
8. "Playing In the Band" (6/22/76 Tower Theatre, Philadelphia, PA) - 3:21
9. "High Time" (6/28/76 Auditorium Theatre, Chicago, IL) - 9:27

== Personnel ==
Grateful Dead

- Jerry Garcia – lead guitar, vocals
- Donna Jean Godchaux – vocals
- Keith Godchaux – Piano
- Mickey Hart – drums
- Bill Kreutzmann – drums
- Phil Lesh – electric bass
- Bob Weir – rhythm guitar, vocals

Production

- Betty Cantor-Jackson – recording
- Jeffrey Norman – mastering

== See also ==
- Dave's Picks Volume 28 - Features the full show from the night before on June 17, 1976 at the Capitol Theater.
