= Grateful Dead Download Series Volume 1 =

Live album by Grateful Dead
- Released: May 3, 2005
- Recorded: April 30, 1977
- Length: 189:08
- Label: Grateful Dead Productions

Grateful Dead chronology
Rare Cuts and Oddities 1966 (2005)	Grateful Dead; Download Series Volume 1 (2005)	Grateful Dead Download Series Volume 2 (2005)

Download Series Volume 1 is the first installment in a series of digital download albums by the rock band Grateful Dead. It was released on May 3, 2005. The album features the complete show from April 30, 1977, which was the second night of a five-night run at the Palladium in New York City. To complete the third disc, bonus material from the previous night's at the same venue is also included .

Volume 1 was mastered in HDCD format from the original 2-track soundboard tapes by Jeffrey Norman. Consistent with other releases in the Download Series, the music is available for download in various formats: 128Kbit or 256Kbit MP3s, or lossless FLAC-files, all without any copy-protection.

== Critical reception ==
Professional ratings
Review scores
Source	Rating
Allmusic	4/5 stars

On AllMusic, Jesse Jarnow said, "Rivaling the spring of 1972 as the most-plundered season in the Grateful Dead's live catalog, the spring of 1977 found the Dead playing at their platonic best. It was during that period that the Dead struck what, for many, remains the perfect balance of tightness and energy of performance... The band's April 30th show at the Palladium – the first release in their downloads series, and the sixth extended release from the spring of 1977, including one box set – has an advantage on the much revered show recorded in Ithaca on May 8th: an actual open-ended jam. A 15-minute "Not Fade Away" veers into deep, melodic abstraction before languidly segueing into Garcia's heart-wrenching ballad "Stella Blue"."

== Track listing ==
=== Disc one ===
First set:

1. "The Music Never Stopped" (John Perry Barlow, Bob Weir) - 7:05
2. "Bertha" (Robert Hunter, Jerry Garcia) - 6:19
3. "It's All Over Now" (Bobby Womack) - 8:04
4. "Deal" (Hunter, Garcia) - 6:11
5. "Mama Tried" > (Merle Haggard) - 2:38
6. "Me and My Uncle" (John Phillips) - 3:04
7. "Peggy-O" (trad., arr. Grateful Dead) - 7:46
8. "Looks Like Rain" (Barlow, Weir) - 9:39
9. "Mississippi Half-Step Uptown Toodeloo" (Hunter, Garcia) - 10:06
10. "Promised Land" (Chuck Berry) - 4:53

=== Disc two ===
Second set:

1. "Scarlet Begonias" > (Hunter, Garcia) - 9:05
2. "Fire on the Mountain" > (Hunter, Mickey Hart) - 11:27
3. "Good Lovin' " (Rudy Clark, Artie Resnick) - 5:47
4. "Friend of the Devil" (John Dawson, Hunter, Garcia) - 8:42
5. "Estimated Prophet" (Barlow, Weir) - 9:01

=== Disc three ===
1. "St. Stephen" > (Hunter, Garcia, Phil Lesh) - 4:34
2. "Not Fade Away" > (Buddy Holly, Norman Petty) - 14:57
3. "Stella Blue" > (Hunter, Garcia) - 9:09
4. "St. Stephen" > (Hunter, Garcia, Lesh) - 0:49
5. "One More Saturday Night" (Weir) - 5:33
6. Encore: "Terrapin Station" (Hunter, Garcia) - 10:20
7. "Sugaree" (Hunter, Garcia) - 14:18
8. "Scarlet Begonias" > (Hunter, Garcia) - 9:45
9. "Goin' Down the Road Feeling Bad" (trad., arr. Grateful Dead) - 10:17

7 - 9 are bonus tracks from 4/29/77

== Personnel ==
Grateful Dead

- Jerry Garcia – lead guitar, vocals
- Donna Jean Godchaux – vocals
- Keith Godchaux – keyboards
- Mickey Hart – drums
- Bill Kreutzmann – drums
- Phil Lesh – electric bass
- Bob Weir – rhythm guitar, vocals

Production

- Betty Cantor-Jackson – recording
- Jeffrey Norman – mastering
