= Grateful Dead Download Series Volume 2 =

Live album by Grateful Dead
- Released: June 7, 2005
- Recorded: January 18, 1970
- Length: 79:47
- Label: Grateful Dead Productions

Grateful Dead chronology
Grateful Dead Download Series Volume 1 (2005)	Grateful Dead; Download Series Volume 2 (2005)	Dick's Picks Volume 35 (2005)

Download Series Volume 2 is a live album by the rock band Grateful Dead. It was released as a digital download on June 7, 2005. The album features a previously uncirculated concert from January 18, 1970, at Springer's Ballroom in Gresham, Oregon (listed incorrectly as Springer's Inn in Portland, Oregon), presented as a one-disc set.

Volume 2 was mastered in HDCD from the original 2-track master tapes by Jeffrey Norman.

== Critical reception ==
Professional ratings
Review scores
Source	Rating
Allmusic	4/5 stars

On AllMusic, Jesse Jarnow said, "Only one tune from [Workingman's Dead or American Beauty] gets played here... though they also charge through a six-minute take of the new (and rare) "Mason's Children".... The highlight is unquestionably a 13-plus minute version of Martha & the Vandellas' "Dancing in the Street". Garcia, Bob Weir, and Phil Lesh's harmonies are big and enthused, the San Francisco ballroom scene encapsulated in one vocal arrangement. The jam makes its way into deeply spaced jazz, Garcia especially wearing his John Coltrane love... on his sleeve."

== Track listing ==
1. "Cold Rain and Snow" (trad., arr. Grateful Dead) - 6:10
2. "Big Boss Man" (Luther Dixon, Al Smith) - 4:48
3. "Mason's Children" (Robert Hunter, Jerry Garcia, Phil Lesh, Bob Weir) - 5:53
4. "Black Peter" (Hunter, Garcia) - 10:44
5. "Dancing in the Street" (Marvin Gaye, Ivy Hunter, William Stevenson) - 14:04
6. "Good Lovin' " (Rudy Clark, Artie Resnick) - 10:17
7. "China Cat Sunflower" > (Hunter, Garcia) - 4:36
8. "I Know You Rider" (trad., arr. Grateful Dead) - 5:08
9. "Turn On Your Love Light" (Deadric Malone, Joseph Scott) - 18:07

== Personnel ==
=== Grateful Dead ===
- Jerry Garcia – lead guitar, vocals
- Ron "Pigpen" McKernan – vocals, percussion
- Tom Constanten – keyboards
- Mickey Hart – drums
- Bill Kreutzmann – drums
- Phil Lesh – electric bass
- Bob Weir – rhythm guitar, vocals

=== Production ===
- Bear – recording
- Jeffrey Norman – mastering
