= Capitol Theatre (Passaic, New Jersey) =

Entertainment venue in New Jersey, US

- Interactive map of Capitol Theatre
- Address: 326 Monroe Street
- Location: Passaic, New Jersey
- Coordinates: 40.8645°N 74.1280°W
- Owner: John Scher
- Capacity: 3,200
- Event: Rock

Construction
- Built: 1921
- Closed: 1989
- Demolished: 1991

The Capitol Theatre was an entertainment venue located at the intersection of Monroe Street and Central Avenue in Passaic, New Jersey. Opened in 1921 as a vaudeville house, the Capitol later served as a movie theater under Fabian Theaters and Warner Bros. Pictures (later Stanley Warner Corporation), then as a venue for rock concerts.

Throughout the 1970s and 1980s, the 3,200-seat theatre was a popular stop on many major rock artist's tours. The venue was known for its in-house video system which resulted in a number of good quality, black and white video bootlegs. After it closed, the building fell into disrepair and it was demolished in April 1991. A shopping center known as Capitol Plaza occupies the site now.

== History ==
=== Vaudeville and films ===
The Capitol Theatre opened on October 7, 1921 with a sold-out concert by the U.S. Marine Band, which helped raise funds for a pipe organ in the city's high school.

By the 1960s, it was known as the Capitol Cinema, and by 1970s the theater was showing adult films.

=== Rock venue ===
On June 27, 1971, the popular Fillmore East theater in New York City closed, ending owner and rock promoter Bill Graham's stipulation that acts who played at his venue were prohibited from performing at any theater within 75 miles for the following four months. John Scher, a young rock promoter from West Orange, New Jersey, seized on the closure of the Fillmore East by acquiring the Capitol Theatre and transforming it into a rock venue.

The first concert at The Capitol Theatre was by The J. Geils Band and Humble Pie on December 16, 1971.

Jerry Garcia played at the Capitol Theatre over 40 times - either with the Grateful Dead or in one of his many side projects (the Jerry Garcia Band, Old & In The Way, Garcia & Saunders, etc). Several of the Grateful Dead shows were released on CD, including the June 17, 1976 performance, which appeared on Dave's Picks Volume 28.

Kiss recorded side 4 of their 1977 live album, Alive II at this venue.

On Monday, November 6th, 1978, a Gala Benefit performance to elect Senatorial candidate Bill Bradley was held at the venue. The featured musical guest was Parliament-Funkadelic and the Brides Of Funkenstein.

The theater closed in 1989 for various reasons, including the changing music industry and the 1981 opening of Brendan Byrne Arena at the nearby Meadowlands Sports Complex. John Scher had also started to promote concerts at the arena, enabling much of the Capitol Theatre staff to obtain employment there when the theater closed.

== In popular culture ==
The Marshall Tucker Band concert from February 18, 1977 was released on December 4, 2007 as a 2 CD/DVD package called Carolina Dreams Tour '77, marking the 30th anniversary of the concert. This is the only known footage of a complete concert by the original members.

== Notable appearances ==
- The Three Stooges - February 14, 1959
- Melanie - February 19, 1972
- The Four Seasons - 1972
- Frank Zappa - October 31, 1972 - 2 shows (With the Petite Wazoo Orchestra)
- The Beach Boys - November 19, 1972
- Genesis - March 1, 1973
- Edgar Winter - March 17, 1973
- Bette Midler - March 10, 1973
- Jerry Garcia Band - June 6, 1973
- Jerry Garcia Band - June 16, 1973
- Jerry Garcia Band - September 6, 1973
- The Pointer Sisters - December 1, 1973
- The Byrds - 1973 (last concert before break-up)
- Mountain - 1973
- Johnny Winter - January 9, 1974
- Melanie - April 5, 1974
- Mountain - April 20, 1974
- Hot Tuna - October 4, 1974
- Lou Reed, Hall & Oates - October 5, 1974
- Santana, Tower of Power - October 10, 1974
- Bruce Springsteen, John Sebastian, Dan Fogelberg - October 18, 1974
- Kiss - October 23, 1974
- Frank Zappa - November 8, 1974
- Jerry Garcia Band - November 9, 1974
- Gregg Allman - 1974, Several recordings appear on The Gregg Allman Tour
- Procol Harum - 1975, Several recordings appear on Procol's Ninth (Deluxe Edition)
- Queen, Argent, Kansas - February 21, 1975 (Sheer Heart Attack Tour)
- Jerry Garcia Band - April 5, 1975
- Lou Reed - May 3, 1975
- Kiss - October 4, 1975 (2 shows)
- Fleetwood Mac - October 17, 1975 (on their tour for Fleetwood Mac across the US and Canada. Show was recorded for broadcast on the King Biscuit Flower Hour.)
- Jerry Garcia Band - November 11, 1975
- Linda Ronstadt - December 6, 1975
- Peter Frampton - February 14, 1976 (2 shows)
- Dan Fogelberg - March 20, 1976
- Jerry Garcia Band - April 2, 1976
- Janis Ian - April 18 1976
- Steve Goodman - April 18, 1976
- Grateful Dead - June 16, 17, 18 and 19, 1976 (released as Grateful Dead Download Series Volume 4 and as part of the 30 Trips Around the Sun and June 1976 box sets)
- Billy Joel - October 2, 1976
- Sparks - November 27, 1976
- Rush - December 10, 1976
- Peter Gabriel - March 5, 1977 (his first concert as a solo artist)
- Grateful Dead - April 25, 26 and 27, 1977 (released as Capitol Theatre, Passaic, NJ, 4/25/77 and as part of the 30 Trips Around the Sun box set)
- Al Stewart - April 30, 1977
- Jerry Garcia Band - November 26, 1977
- Rick Danko - December 17, 1977
- Randy Newman - February 11, 1978
- Jerry Garcia Band - March 17, 1978
- Ramones, The Runaways, Tuff Darts - March 25, 1978
- Journey - June 10, 1978 (first tour with Steve Perry)
- Elvis Costello and the Attractions, Mink DeVille, Nick Lowe & Rockpile - May 5, 1978
- Meat Loaf - May 26, 1978
- The Rolling Stones - June 14, 1978
- Bruce Springsteen & The E Street Band - September 19–21, 1978 (the Sept. 19 show was broadcast throughout the tri-state area)
- Player - October 8, 1978
- Frank Zappa - October 13, 1978 (two shows on one day)
- The Roches - October 21, 1978
- Harry Chapin - October 21, 1978 (performing alone, without his band)
- Parliament-Funkadelic - November 6, 1978
- Outlaws and Molly Hatchet - November 10, 1978
- Grateful Dead - November 24, 1978
- Cheap Trick - December 8, 1978
- Robert Gordon and Southside Johnny and the Asbury Jukes - December 30–31, 1978
- Heart - January 26, 1979
- Willie Nelson and Leon Russell - March 1, 1979
- Judy Collins - March 10, 1979 (Hard Times for Lovers tour)
- Irakere - March 23, 1979
- Toto with Sad Cafe - April 21, 1979
- The Who - September 10–11, 1979
- Van Morrison - October 6, 1979
- Talking Heads - November 17, 1979 (part released on The Name of This Band is Talking Heads)
- Rainbow - December 1, 1979
- Southside Johnny and the Asbury Jukes - December 31, 1979
- Jerry Garcia Band - March 1, 1980 (released as Garcia Live Volume One)
- The Clash - March 8, 1980
- Willie Colón & his Orchestra, featuring Rubén Blades and Celia Cruz - March 22, 1980
- Cheap Trick - March 29, 1980
- Grateful Dead - March 30, 31, and April 1, 1980
- The Brothers Johnson - April 25, 1980
- Genesis - June 28, 1980
- Jerry Garcia Band - July 26, 1980
- The English Beat - September 26, 1980
- Gary Numan - October 18, 1980
- Talking Heads - November 4, 1980
- The B-52's - November 7, 1980
- The Police - November 29, 1980
- Boz Scaggs - November 30, 1980
- Southside Johnny and the Asbury Jukes - December 31, 1980
- The Allman Brothers Band - January 3 and 4, 1981
- Jerry Garcia Band - February 13, 1981
- Ozzy Osbourne - April 24, 1981 (with Randy Rhoads, Tommy Aldridge and Rudy Sarzo)
- Alice Cooper - October 10, 1981
- Jerry Garcia Band - November 6, 1981
- Blue Öyster Cult - December 26, 1981
- Southside Johnny and the Asbury Jukes - December 31, 1981
- Prince - January 30, 1982 (with Bobby Z., Brown Mark, Dez Dickerson, Doctor Fink and Lisa Coleman)
- Jerry Garcia - April 10, 1982
- John Mayall & the Bluesbreakers - June 18, 1982
- Jerry Garcia Band - June 24, 1982
- Warren Zevon - October 1, 1982 (show was recorded for a later broadcast on the King Biscuit Flower Hour)
- Stray Cats (Stevie Ray Vaughan & Double Trouble were added to the bill a half-hour before showtime)
- Randy Newman - March 26, 1983
- U2 - May 12, 1983
- Jerry Garcia Band - June 3, 1983
- R.E.M. - June 9, 1984
- Culture Club - September 3, 1983
- Jerry Garcia Band - December 10, 1983
- George Thorogood and The Destroyers - July 5, 1984
- Lou Reed - September 25, 1984
- Jethro Tull – October 28, 1984
- Dave Edmunds’ Ten Great Guitars with Link Wray, Dickey Betts, Johnny Winter, Brian Setzer, Steve Cropper, David Gilmour, Neal Schon, Lita Ford and Tony Iommi - November 3, 1984
- Jerry Garcia Band - November 24, 1984
- Dave Edmunds - February 28, 1985
- Southside Johnny & the Asbury Jukes with guest appearance by Little Steven - September 20, 1985
- Stevie Ray Vaughan & Double Trouble - September 21, 1985
- Jerry Garcia Band - January 31, 1986
- Metallica with Metal Church opening - November 29, 1986 (Damage, Inc. Tour)
- The Kinks - March 4, 1987
- Beastie Boys - April 1, 1987 (Murphy's Law and Public Enemy open. The first show in which Flavor Flav wears his signature clock necklace on stage.)
- Megadeth with Warlock and Sanctuary opening - April 23, 1988 (So Far, So Good. . . So What! Tour)
- Duran Duran - March 11, 1989

Pig Light Show appeared from the Opening Night in December 1971 till the end of June 1973, performing with all artists during those dates.
