= Pacific Northwest '73–'74: Believe It If You Need It =

Live album by Grateful Dead
- Released: September 7, 2018
- Recorded: June 22, 24, 1973; May 17, 19, 21, 1974
- Genre: Rock
- Length: 234:30
- Label: Rhino (R2 572292)
- Producer: Grateful Dead

Grateful Dead chronology
Pacific Northwest '73–'74: The Complete Recordings (2018)	Pacific Northwest '73–'74: Believe It If You Need It (2018)	Portland Memorial Coliseum, Portland, OR, 5/19/74 (2018)

Pacific Northwest '73–'74: Believe It If You Need It is a three-CD live album by the rock band the Grateful Dead. It contains songs recorded at various concerts in the Pacific Northwest in 1973 and 1974. It was released on September 7, 2018. The songs on the album are excerpted from the 19-CD box set Pacific Northwest '73–'74: The Complete Recordings, which contains six complete shows and was released the same day.

== Critical reception ==
On AllMusic, Fred Thomas wrote, "Culled from several shows taking place in the Pacific Northwest on summer tours of 1973 and 1974, Believe It If You Need It zeroes in on the Grateful Dead in a particularly playful and comfortable phase, with the Deadhead-populated region and the Dead's first taste of financial success giving their playing in this time a more carefree fluidity.... "Playing in the Band" from a 5/21/74 performance at the University of Washington in Seattle is nothing short of epic, even for the Dead.... Even with the odd presentation and occasional performance issues, this set captures the Dead in what would be a short-lived period of playful release, grappling with both sadness and success through some of their most free and searching playing."

== Track listing ==
Disc one
No.	Title	Writer(s)	Recorded	Venue	Length
1.	"China Cat Sunflower" →	Jerry Garcia, Robert Hunter	May 19, 1974	Portland Memorial Coliseum; Portland, Oregon	8:38
2.	"I Know You Rider"	Traditional, arranged by Grateful Dead	May 19, 1974	Portland Memorial Coliseum; Portland, Oregon	5:30
3.	"Bird Song"	Garcia, Hunter	June 22, 1973	P.N.E. Coliseum; Vancouver, British Columbia	14:21
4.	"Box of Rain"	Phil Lesh, Hunter	June 24, 1973	Portland Memorial Coliseum; Portland, Oregon	5:19
5.	"Brown-Eyed Women"	Garcia, Hunter	May 21, 1974	Hec Edmundson Pavilion; Seattle, Washington	5:02
6.	"Truckin'" → (Note: "Tico-Tico" tuning before "Truckin'")	Garcia, Lesh, Bob Weir, Hunter	May 19, 1974	Portland Memorial Coliseum; Portland, Oregon	10:43
7.	"Jam" →	Grateful Dead	May 19, 1974	Portland Memorial Coliseum; Portland, Oregon	9:58
8.	"Not Fade Away" →	Buddy Holly, Norman Petty	May 19, 1974	Portland Memorial Coliseum; Portland, Oregon	6:56
9.	"Goin' Down the Road Feeling Bad"	Traditional, arranged by Grateful Dead	May 19, 1974	Portland Memorial Coliseum; Portland, Oregon	7:01
10.	"One More Saturday Night"	Weir	May 19, 1974	Portland Memorial Coliseum; Portland, Oregon	4:51
Disc two
No.	Title	Writer(s)	Recorded	Venue	Length
1.	"Here Comes Sunshine"	Garcia, Hunter	June 22, 1973	P.N.E. Coliseum; Vancouver, British Columbia	12:11
2.	"Eyes of the World" →	Garcia, Hunter	May 17, 1974	P.N.E. Coliseum; Vancouver, British Columbia	13:24
3.	"China Doll"	Garcia, Hunter	May 21, 1974	Hec Edmundson Pavilion; Seattle, Washington	5:33
4.	"Playing in the Band"	Weir, Mickey Hart, Hunter	May 21, 1974	Hec Edmundson Pavilion; Seattle, Washington	46:32
Disc three
No.	Title	Writer(s)	Recorded	Venue	Length
1.	"Sugaree"	Garcia, Hunter	May 17, 1974	P.N.E. Coliseum; Vancouver, British Columbia	7:37
2.	"He's Gone" →	Garcia, Hunter	June 22, 1973	P.N.E. Coliseum; Vancouver, British Columbia	11:30
3.	"Truckin'" →	Garcia, Lesh, Weir, Hunter	June 22, 1973	P.N.E. Coliseum; Vancouver, British Columbia	26:06
4.	"The Other One" →	Weir, Bill Kreutzmann	June 22, 1973	P.N.E. Coliseum; Vancouver, British Columbia	15:43
5.	"Wharf Rat" →	Garcia, Hunter	June 22, 1973	P.N.E. Coliseum; Vancouver, British Columbia	7:58
6.	"Sugar Magnolia"	Weir, Hunter	June 22, 1973	P.N.E. Coliseum; Vancouver, British Columbia	9:53

== Personnel ==
Grateful Dead

- Jerry Garcia – guitar, vocals
- Donna Jean Godchaux – vocals
- Keith Godchaux – keyboards
- Bill Kreutzmann – drums
- Phil Lesh – bass, vocals
- Bob Weir – guitar, vocals

Production

- Produced by Grateful Dead
- Produced for release by David Lemieux
- Mastering: Jeffrey Norman
- Recording: Rex Jackson (1973), Kidd Candelario (1974)
- Original art: Roy Henry Vickers
- Art direction: Roy Henry Vickers, Lisa Glines, Doran Tyson
- Design: Lisa Glines
- Photos: Richard Pechner
- Liner notes: Jesse Jarnow
