= Rare Cuts and Oddities 1966 =

Compilation album by Grateful Dead
- Released: March 25, 2005
- Recorded: 1966
- Genres: Psychedelic rock Jam band
- Label: Grateful Dead Records
- Producer: David Lemieux

Grateful Dead chronology
The Grateful Dead Movie Soundtrack (2005)	Rare Cuts and Oddities 1966 (2005)	Grateful Dead Download Series Volume 1 (2005)

Professional ratings
Review scores
Source	Rating
Allmusic	4/5 stars
The Music Box	3/5 stars

Rare Cuts and Oddities 1966 is an album of live and studio tracks recorded by the rock band the Grateful Dead in 1966. It was released on CD by Grateful Dead Records on March 25, 2005.

Rare Cuts and Oddities 1966 was re-released as a limited-edition, two-disc LP in conjunction with Record Store Day on April 20, 2013.

== Track listing ==
1. "Walking the Dog" (Rufus Thomas) – 5:38
2. "You See a Broken Heart" (Ron "Pigpen" McKernan) – 2:50
3. "The Promised Land" (Chuck Berry) – 2:31
4. "Good Lovin' " (Artie Resnick, Rudy Clark) – 2:41
5. "Standing on the Corner" (Grateful Dead) – 2:55
6. "Cream Puff War" (Jerry Garcia) – 3:37
7. "Betty and Dupree" (traditional, arranged by Grateful Dead) – 5:35
8. "Stealin' " (Gus Cannon) – 2:53
9. "Silver Threads and Golden Needles" (Dick Reynolds, Jack Rhodes) – 3:00
10. "Not Fade Away" (Buddy Holly, Norman Petty) – 3:51
11. "Big Railroad Blues" (Noah Lewis) – 3:10
12. "Sick and Tired" (Dave Bartholomew, Chris Kenner) – 3:19
13. "Empty Heart" (Mick Jagger, Brian Jones, Keith Richards, Charlie Watts, Bill Wyman) – 6:18
14. "Gangster of Love" (Johnny "Guitar" Watson) – 4:35
15. "Don't Mess Up a Good Thing" (Oliver Sain) – 2:56
16. "Hey Little One" (Dorsey Burnette, Barry De Vorzon) – 5:02
17. "I'm a King Bee" (Slim Harpo) – 6:01
18. "Caution (Do Not Stop on Tracks)" (Grateful Dead) – 9:18

== Recording dates ==
- Tracks 1–6 & 10 – early 1966 studio recordings
- Tracks 7–8 – March 2 studio recordings
- Track 9 – late 1966 studio recording
- Tracks 11–13 – February/March live recordings
- Tracks 14–15 – Recorded live at the Fillmore Auditorium in San Francisco on July 3, a concert later released in full on 30 Trips Around the Sun
- Tracks 16–18 – Recorded live at the Danish Center in Los Angeles on March 12

== Personnel ==
=== Grateful Dead ===
- Jerry Garcia – guitar, vocals
- Bob Weir – guitar, vocals
- Ron "Pigpen" McKernan – harmonica, organ, vocals
- Phil Lesh – electric bass, vocals
- Bill Kreutzmann – drums

=== Production ===
- Owsley Stanley – original recordings producer and notes
- Grateful Dead – producers (track 9)
- David Lemieux – compilation producer and additional liner notes
- Jeffrey Norman – CD mastering
- Herb Greene – photos
- Robert Chevalier – photos
- Richard Biffle – cover art
- Eileen Law – archival research
- Brian Connors – art coordination
- Robert Minkin – package layout
