= Pacific Northwest '73–'74: The Complete Recordings =

Live album and box set by Grateful Dead
- Released: September 7, 2018
- Recorded: June 22, 24, 26, 1973; May 17, 19, 21, 1974
- Genre: Rock
- Label: Rhino
- Producer: Grateful Dead

Grateful Dead chronology
Dave's Picks Volume 27 (2018)	Pacific Northwest '73–'74: The Complete Recordings (2018)	Pacific Northwest '73–'74: Believe It If You Need It (2018)

Grateful Dead concert box set chronology
May 1977: Get Shown the Light (2017)	Pacific Northwest '73–'74: The Complete Recordings (2018)	Giants Stadium 1987, 1989, 1991 (2019)

Pacific Northwest '73–'74: The Complete Recordings is a live box set album by the rock band the Grateful Dead. It contains six complete concerts recorded in the Pacific Northwest in 1973 and 1974, on 19 CDs. It was released, in a limited edition of 15,000 copies, on September 7, 2018.

A 3-CD album of songs selected from Pacific Northwest '73–'74: The Complete Recordings, titled Pacific Northwest '73–'74: Believe It If You Need It, was released the same day.

Pacific Northwest '73–'74: The Complete Recordings was nominated for a Grammy Award for Best Boxed or Special Limited Edition Package. The CDs are contained in a bentwood box decorated with First Nations-inspired art by Roy Henry Vickers.

== Concerts ==
The concert recordings included in the album are:

- June 22, 1973 – P.N.E. Coliseum, Vancouver, British Columbia
- June 24, 1973 – Portland Memorial Coliseum, Portland, Oregon
- June 26, 1973 – Seattle Center Arena, Seattle, Washington
- May 17, 1974 – P.N.E. Coliseum, Vancouver, British Columbia
- May 19, 1974 – Portland Memorial Coliseum, Portland, Oregon
- May 21, 1974 – Hec Edmundson Pavilion, Seattle, Washington

== Track listing ==
=== June 22, 1973 – P.N.E. Coliseum, Vancouver, British Columbia ===
Disc 1

First set:

1. "Bertha" (Jerry Garcia, Robert Hunter) – 6:30
2. "Beat It On Down the Line" (Jesse Fuller) – 3:41
3. "Deal" (Garcia, Hunter) – 5:00
4. "Mexicali Blues" (Bob Weir, John Perry Barlow) – 4:02
5. "Box of Rain" (Phil Lesh, Hunter) – 5:47
6. "Bird Song" (Garcia, Hunter) – 14:29
7. "The Race Is On" (Don Rollins) – 3:17
8. "Sugaree" (Garcia, Hunter) – 8:05
9. "Looks Like Rain" (Weir, Barlow) – 7:34
10. "Row Jimmy" (Garcia, Hunter) – 9:22
11. "Jack Straw" (Weir, Hunter) – 5:01

Disc 2

1. "China Cat Sunflower" → (Garcia, Hunter) – 8:39
2. "I Know You Rider" (traditional, arranged by Grateful Dead) – 5:48
3. "Big River" (Johnny Cash) – 5:01
4. "Tennessee Jed" (Garcia, Hunter) – 8:00
5. "Playing in the Band" (Weir, Mickey Hart, Hunter) – 18:59

Second set:

6. "Here Comes Sunshine" (Garcia, Hunter) – 12:25
7. "Promised Land" (Chuck Berry) – 2:58
8. "Brown-Eyed Women" (Garcia, Hunter) – 5:30
9. "El Paso" (Marty Robbins) – 4:33

Disc 3

1. "Black Peter" (Garcia, Hunter) – 9:23
2. "Greatest Story Ever Told" (Weir, Hunter) – 5:00
3. "Big Railroad Blues" (Noah Lewis) – 3:56
4. "He's Gone" → (Garcia, Hunter) – 11:24
5. "Truckin'" → (Garcia, Lesh, Weir, Hunter) – 26:06
6. "The Other One" → (Weir, Bill Kreutzmann) – 15:22
7. "Wharf Rat" (Garcia, Hunter) – 8:05

Disc 4

1. "Sugar Magnolia" (Weir, Hunter) – 9:57
2. "Casey Jones" (Garcia, Hunter) – 7:31

Encore:

3. "Johnny B. Goode" (Berry) – 3:56

=== June 24, 1973 – Portland Memorial Coliseum, Portland, Oregon ===
Disc 5

First set:

1. "Promised Land" (Berry) – 3:43
2. "Loser" (Garcia, Hunter) – 7:09
3. "Mexicali Blues" (Weir, Barlow) – 3:53
4. "They Love Each Other" (Garcia, Hunter) – 5:48
5. "Looks Like Rain" (Weir, Barlow) – 7:52
6. "Box of Rain" (Lesh, Hunter) – 5:30
7. "Big Railroad Blues" (Lewis) – 4:20
8. "Jack Straw" (Weir, Hunter) – 5:02
9. "Sugaree" (Garcia, Hunter) – 7:24
10. "The Race Is On" (Rollins) – 3:27
11. "Row Jimmy" (Garcia, Hunter) – 8:30
12. "Beat It On Down the Line" (Fuller) – 3:30
13. "China Cat Sunflower" → (Garcia, Hunter) – 6:47
14. "I Know You Rider" (traditional, arranged by Grateful Dead) – 5:05

Disc 6

1. "Around and Around" (Berry) – 5:06

Second set:

2. "Mississippi Half-Step Uptown Toodeloo" (Garcia, Hunter) – 8:44
3. "You Ain't Woman Enough" (Loretta Lynn) – 3:42
4. "El Paso" (Robbins) – 4:35
5. "Stella Blue" (Garcia, Hunter) – 7:57
6. "Greatest Story Ever Told" → (Weir, Hunter) – 5:04
7. "Bertha" (Garcia, Hunter) – 6:12
8. "Big River" (Cash) – 4:47

Disc 7

1. "Dark Star" → (Garcia, Hart, Kreutzmann, Lesh, Ron "Pigpen" McKernan, Weir, Hunter) – 27:46
2. "Eyes of the World" → (Garcia, Hunter) – 15:40
3. "China Doll" (Garcia, Hunter) – 6:38
4. "Sugar Magnolia" (Weir, Hunter) – 9:40

Encore:

5. "One More Saturday Night" (Weir) – 5:16

=== June 26, 1973 – Seattle Center Arena, Seattle, Washington ===
Disc 8

First set:

1. "Casey Jones" → (Garcia, Hunter) – 6:01
2. "Greatest Story Ever Told" (Weir, Hunter) – 5:33
3. "Brown-Eyed Women" (Garcia, Hunter) – 5:47
4. "Jack Straw" (Weir, Hunter) – 5:04
5. "Box of Rain" (Lesh, Hunter) – 5:35
6. "Deal" (Garcia, Hunter) – 4:23
7. "Mexicali Blues" (Weir, Barlow) – 4:08
8. "You Ain't Woman Enough" (Lynn) – 3:47
9. "Row Jimmy" (Garcia, Hunter) – 9:06
10. "The Race Is On" (Rollins) – 3:34
11. "China Cat Sunflower" → (Garcia, Hunter) – 8:08
12. "I Know You Rider" (traditional, arranged by Grateful Dead) – 6:00
13. "Beat It On Down the Line" (Fuller) – 3:28
14. "Loser" (Garcia, Hunter) – 6:50

Disc 9

1. "Playing in the Band" (Weir, Hart, Hunter) – 15:49

Second set:

2. "Bertha" (Garcia, Hunter) – 5:56
3. "Promised Land" (Berry) – 3:27
4. "They Love Each Other" (Garcia, Hunter) – 5:46
5. "El Paso" (Robbins) – 4:28
6. "Black Peter" (Garcia, Hunter) – 9:18
7. "Big River" (Cash) – 4:58
8. "Here Comes Sunshine" (Garcia, Hunter) – 11:58
9. "Me and My Uncle" (John Phillips) – 3:11

Disc 10

1. "He's Gone" → (Garcia, Hunter) – 13:59
2. "Truckin'" → (Garcia, Lesh, Weir, Hunter) – 10:55
3. "The Other One" → (Weir, Kreutzmann) – 6:33
4. "Me and Bobby McGee" → (Kris Kristofferson) – 5:25
5. "The Other One" → (Weir, Kreutzmann) – 18:06
6. "Sugar Magnolia" (Weir, Hunter) – 10:03

Encore:

7. "Johnny B. Goode" (Berry) – 3:56

=== May 17, 1974 – P.N.E. Coliseum, Vancouver, British Columbia ===
Disc 11

First set:

1. "Promised Land" (Berry) – 3:33
2. "Deal" (Garcia, Hunter) – 4:45
3. "The Race Is On" (Rollins) – 3:34
4. "Ramble On Rose" (Garcia, Hunter) – 6:56
5. "Jack Straw" (Weir, Hunter) – 5:16
6. "Dire Wolf" (Garcia, Hunter) – 5:28
7. "Beat It On Down the Line" (Fuller) – 3:53
8. "Loose Lucy" (Garcia, Hunter) – 5:07
9. "Big River" (Cash) – 5:22
10. "It Must Have Been the Roses" (Hunter) – 5:47
11. "Mexicali Blues" (Weir, Barlow) – 3:48
12. "Row Jimmy" (Garcia, Hunter) – 8:59

Disc 12

1. "Playing in the Band" (Weir, Hart, Hunter) – 23:07

Second set:

2. "U.S. Blues" (Garcia, Hunter) – 6:09
3. "Me and My Uncle" (Phillips) – 3:17
4. "Ship of Fools" (Garcia, Hunter) – 6:27
5. "Money Money" (Weir, Barlow) – 4:45
6. "China Cat Sunflower" → (Garcia, Hunter) – 8:20
7. "I Know You Rider" (traditional, arranged by Grateful Dead) – 5:22

Disc 13

1. "Greatest Story Ever Told" (Weir, Hunter) – 5:27
2. "Sugaree" (Garcia, Hunter) – 8:18
3. "Truckin'" → (Garcia, Lesh, Weir, Hunter) – 9:56
4. "Nobody's Fault But Mine" → (traditional, arranged by Grateful Dead) – 5:14
5. "Eyes of the World" → (Garcia, Hunter) – 13:19
6. "China Doll" (Garcia, Hunter) – 6:01
7. "Sugar Magnolia" (Weir, Hunter) – 9:21

=== May 19, 1974 – Portland Memorial Coliseum, Portland, Oregon ===
Disc 14

First set:

1. "Mississippi Half-Step Uptown Toodeloo" (Garcia, Hunter) – 8:14
2. "Mexicali Blues" (Weir, Barlow) – 3:58
3. "Big Railroad Blues" (Lewis) – 3:57
4. "Black-Throated Wind" (Weir, Barlow) – 7:08
5. "Scarlet Begonias" (Garcia, Hunter) – 5:12
6. "Beat It On Down the Line" (Fuller) – 3:47
7. "Tennessee Jed" (Garcia, Hunter) – 8:27
8. "Me and Bobby McGee" (Kristofferson) – 6:02
9. "Sugaree" (Garcia, Hunter) – 7:31
10. "Jack Straw" (Weir, Hunter) – 5:23
11. "It Must Have Been the Roses" (Hunter) – 5:28
12. "El Paso" (Robbins) – 4:35
13. "Loose Lucy" (Garcia, Hunter) – 5:07
14. "Money Money" (Weir, Barlow) – 4:27

Disc 15

1. "China Cat Sunflower" → (Garcia, Hunter) – 8:34
2. "I Know You Rider" (traditional, arranged by Grateful Dead) – 5:40

Second set:

3. "Promised Land" → (Berry) – 3:37
4. "Bertha" → (Garcia, Hunter) – 6:08
5. "Greatest Story Ever Told" (Weir, Hunter) – 6:10
6. "Ship of Fools" (Garcia, Hunter) – 6:36
7. "Weather Report Suite" → (Weir, Eric Andersen, Barlow) – 17:58
8. "Wharf Rat" (Garcia, Hunter) – 10:49
9. "Big River" (Cash) – 5:36
10. "Peggy-O" (traditional, arranged by Grateful Dead) – 8:11

Disc 16

1. "Truckin'" → (Garcia, Lesh, Weir, Hunter) – 9:15
2. "Jam" → (Grateful Dead) – 9:58
3. "Not Fade Away" → (Buddy Holly, Norman Petty) – 6:58
4. "Goin' Down the Road Feeling Bad" (traditional, arranged by Grateful Dead) – 6:59
5. "One More Saturday Night" (Weir) – 5:36

Encore:

6. "U.S. Blues" (Garcia, Hunter) – 5:37

=== May 21, 1974 – Hec Edmundson Pavilion, Seattle, Washington ===
Disc 17

First set:

1. "Me and My Uncle" (Phillips) – 3:25
2. "Brown-Eyed Women" (Garcia, Hunter) – 5:20
3. "Beat It On Down the Line" (Fuller) – 3:47
4. "Deal" (Garcia, Hunter) – 4:55
5. "Mexicali Blues" (Weir, Hunter) – 3:59
6. "It Must Have Been the Roses" (Hunter) – 5:45
7. "The Race Is On" (Rollins) – 3:34
8. "Scarlet Begonias" (Garcia, Hunter) – 5:55
9. "El Paso" (Robbins) – 4:56
10. "Row Jimmy" (Garcia, Hunter) – 9:25
11. "Money Money" (Weir, Barlow) – 5:01
12. "Ship of Fools" (Garcia, Hunter) – 6:18

Disc 18

1. "Weather Report Suite" → (Weir, Andersen, Barlow) – 17:22
2. "China Doll" (Garcia, Hunter) – 5:48

Second set:

3. "Playing in the Band" (Weir, Hart, Hunter) – 46:59
4. "U.S. Blues" (Garcia, Hunter) – 5:47

Disc 19

1. "Big River" (Cash) – 5:24
2. "Stella Blue" (Garcia, Hunter) – 8:40
3. "Around and Around" (Berry) – 5:25
4. "Eyes of the World" → (Garcia, Hunter) – 13:52
5. "Wharf Rat" → (Garcia, Hunter) – 9:45
6. "Sugar Magnolia" (Weir, Hunter) – 10:03

Encore:

7. "Johnny B. Goode" (Berry) – 4:08

== Personnel ==
Grateful Dead

- Jerry Garcia – lead guitar, vocals
- Donna Jean Godchaux – vocals
- Keith Godchaux – keyboards
- Bill Kreutzmann – drums
- Phil Lesh – bass, vocals
- Bob Weir – rhythm guitar, vocals

Production

- Produced by Grateful Dead
- Produced for release by David Lemieux
- Mastering: Jeffrey Norman
- Recording: Rex Jackson (6/22/73, 6/24/73), Kidd Candelario (6/26/73, 5/17/74, 5/19/74, 5/21/74)
- Analog tape transfers and restoration: John K. Chester, Jamie Howarth - Plangent Processes
- Cover art: Roy Henry Vickers
- Photos: Richie Pechner
- Liner notes: Nicholas G. Meriwether

== Charts ==
Chart (2018)	Peak position
US Billboard 200	88
US Top Rock Albums (Billboard)	12
