= Long Strange Trip =

- Long Strange Trip film poster
- Directed by: Amir Bar-Lev
- Produced by: Eric Eisner; Alex Blavatnik; Nicholas Koskoff; Justin Kreutzmann; Ken Dornstein
- Starring: Grateful Dead
- Edited by: Keith Fraase; John Walter
- Production companies: Double E Pictures; AOMA Sunshine Films; Sikelia Productions
- Distributed by: Abramorama; Amazon Studios
- Release date: January 23, 2017
- Running time: 238 minutes
- Country: United States
- Language: English

Long Strange Trip is a 2017 American documentary film about the rock band the Grateful Dead. It premiered on January 23, 2017, at the Sundance Film Festival. It had a one-night only nationwide screening on May 25, 2017, and a week-long limited theatrical release in New York and Los Angeles starting on May 26. The film was split into a six-part miniseries, which became available on Amazon Prime Video on June 2, 2017.

Long Strange Trip was directed by Amir Bar-Lev, and has a running time of almost four hours. Martin Scorsese was one of the executive producers. Justin Kreutzmann, the son of Grateful Dead drummer Bill Kreutzmann, was one of the producers.

The film features newly conducted interviews with living band members (at the time of production) and friends including Bob Weir and his wife Natascha, Mickey Hart, Bill Kreutzmann, Phil Lesh, John Perry Barlow, Donna Godchaux, Dennis McNally, Barbara "Brigid" Meier, Nick Paumgarten, Steve Silberman, and Alan Trist.

A soundtrack album was released on May 26, 2017.

Long Strange Trip was nominated for a Grammy Award for Best Music Film.

== Critical reception ==
Owen Gleiberman wrote in Variety, "At three hours and 58 minutes, it has the sprawl and generosity of a good Dead show, yet there's nothing indulgent about it – it's an ardent piece of documentary classicism.... Deadheads will drink it in and debate it, poring over every detail it works in and leaves out, yet the ultimate recommendation I can give the movie is this: I'm one of those people who can't stand the Grateful Dead... yet I found Long Strange Trip enthralling. For the first time, it made me see, and feel, and understand the slovenly glory of what they were up to, even if my ears still process their music as monotonous roots-rock wallpaper."

Jordan Hoffman wrote in Vanity Fair, "The film's first half is a typical, though very well-polished rock doc: getting the band together, how they found their sound, their struggles and successes. After intermission, the narrative goes to unexpected and extremely emotional places: an examination of intense public adoration and the burdens of fame. For lack of a better term, it becomes a real movie.... But I do think that Bar-Lev has done the impossible: his film will make those who normally scoff at those patchouli-smelling ersatz flower children tap their feet, maybe even join them for a dance."

In the Los Angeles Times, Robin Abcarian said, "I can't imagine that anyone will walk away from Long Strange Trip, Amir Bar-Lev's remarkable four-hour documentary about the Grateful Dead, without a newfound appreciation for the band's music and its place in American popular culture."

== Home video release ==
The film was made available on the Blu-ray, DVD and other digital formats on November 9, 2018. The two-DVD release features commentary from Amir Bar-Lev and editor John Walter. The third disc of the three-DVD Deluxe Edition contains footage of the Grateful Dead's May 24, 1970 performance at the Hollywood Festival in England.

== Soundtrack album ==
Long Strange Trip

Compilation album / Soundtrack album by Grateful Dead
- Released: May 23, 2017
- Recorded: 1969–1994
- Genre: Rock
- Label: Rhino
- Producer: Grateful Dead

Grateful Dead chronology
Cornell 5/8/77 (2017)	Long Strange Trip (2017)	Dave's Picks Volume 23 (2017)

The documentary's soundtrack album Long Strange Trip contains songs compiled from various live and studio recordings by the band, many of which had been previously released. There are two versions of the album – one with two CDs, and another, available only from Amazon.com, with three CDs. It was released on May 26, 2017. The longer version of the album was released as a six-disc vinyl LP on August 4, 2017, in a limited edition of 2,500 copies.

=== Critical reception ===
Stephen Thomas Erlewine wrote on AllMusic, "Like the film, the Long Strange Trip soundtrack skips entire portions of the Dead's history because it focuses on the bigger picture. Some eras are soft-peddled and some classic songs are missing but by threading in studio cuts with the live tracks, this gives a good idea of everything the Grateful Dead did and why they matter."

=== Track listing ===
Disc 1
No.	Title	Writer(s)	Originally released	Recorded	Length
1.	"Death Don't Have No Mercy"	Reverend Gary Davis	Live/Dead	Fillmore West, San Francisco, CA, 3/2/1969	10:31
2.	"St. Stephen"	Jerry Garcia, Phil Lesh, Robert Hunter	Live/Dead	Fillmore West, San Francisco, CA, 2/27/1969	6:41
3.	"Uncle John's Band"	Garcia, Hunter	Workingman's Dead	1970	4:46
4.	"Dark Star"	Garcia, Mickey Hart, Bill Kreutzmann, Lesh, Ron McKernan, Bob Weir, Hunter	previously unreleased	Fillmore East, New York, NY, 2/14/1970	23:51
5.	"Easy Wind"	Hunter	Workingman's Dead	1970	5:01
6.	"Candyman"	Garcia, Hunter	American Beauty	1970	6:16
7.	"China Cat Sunflower" >	Garcia, Hunter	previously unreleased	Château d'Hérouville, Hérouville, France, 6/21/1971	5:09
8.	"I Know You Rider"	traditional, arranged by Grateful Dead	previously unreleased	Château d'Hérouville, Hérouville, France, 6/21/1971	5:54
9.	"Morning Dew"	Bonnie Dobson, Tim Rose	Europe '72	Lyceum Theatre, London, England, 5/26/1972	11:43
Disc 2
No.	Title	Writer(s)	Originally released	Recorded	Length
1.	"He's Gone"	Garcia, Hunter	Sunshine Daydream	Renaissance Faire Grounds, Veneta, OR, 8/27/1972	8:52
2.	"The Music Never Stopped"	Weir, John Perry Barlow	One from the Vault	Great American Music Hall, San Francisco, CA, 8/13/1975	5:32
3.	"Scarlet Begonias" >	Garcia, Hunter	Cornell 5/8/77	Barton Hall, Cornell University, Ithaca, NY, 5/8/1977	9:53
4.	"Fire on the Mountain"	Hart, Hunter	Cornell 5/8/77	Barton Hall, Cornell University, Ithaca, NY, 5/8/1977	15:09
5.	"Althea"	Garcia, Hunter	Go to Nassau	Nassau Coliseum, Uniondale, NY, 5/16/1980	8:32
6.	"Touch of Grey"	Garcia, Hunter	In the Dark	1987	5:51
7.	"Dear Mr. Fantasy" >	Jim Capaldi, Steve Winwood, Chris Wood	previously unreleased	Sullivan Stadium, Foxboro, MA, 7/2/1989	7:06
8.	"Hey Jude"	John Lennon, Paul McCartney	previously unreleased	Sullivan Stadium, Foxboro, MA, 7/2/1989	3:59
9.	"Ripple"	Garcia, Hunter	American Beauty	1970	4:09
10.	"Brokedown Palace"	Garcia, Hunter	American Beauty	1970	4:06
Disc 3 – Amazon exclusive
No.	Title	Writer(s)	Originally released	Recorded	Length
1.	"Playing in the Band"	Weir, Hunter	Europe '72: The Complete Recordings	Beat-Club, Bremen, West Germany, 4/21/1972	9:48
2.	"Eyes of the World"	Garcia, Hunter	Dick's Picks Volume 31	Roosevelt Stadium, Jersey City, NJ, 8/6/1974	18:35
3.	"St. Stephen" >	Garcia, Lesh, Hunter	Cornell 5/8/77	Barton Hall, Cornell University, Ithaca, NY, 5/8/1977	4:47
4.	"Not Fade Away" >	Buddy Holly, Norman Petty	Cornell 5/8/77	Barton Hall, Cornell University, Ithaca, NY, 5/8/1977	16:20
5.	"St. Stephen"	Garcia, Lesh, Hunter	Cornell 5/8/77	Barton Hall, Cornell University, Ithaca, NY, 5/8/1977	2:04
6.	"Dark Hollow"	Bill Browning	Reckoning	Warfield Theatre, San Francisco, CA, 10/7/1980	4:04
7.	"Stella Blue"	Garcia, Hunter	previously unreleased	Zoo Amphitheater, Oklahoma City, OK, 7/5/1981	10:14
8.	"Days Between"	Garcia, Hunter	previously unreleased	Madison Square Garden, New York, NY, 10/18/1994	13:56

=== Personnel ===
Grateful Dead

- Jerry Garcia – guitar, vocals
- Bob Weir – guitar, vocals
- Phil Lesh – bass, vocals
- Bill Kreutzmann – drums, percussion
- Mickey Hart – drums, percussion
- Ron "Pigpen" McKernan – organ, harmonica, percussion, vocals
- Tom Constanten – keyboards
- Keith Godchaux – keyboards
- Donna Jean Godchaux – vocals
- Brent Mydland – keyboards, vocals
- Vince Welnick – keyboards, vocals

Additional musicians

- Ned Lagin – piano on "Candyman"
- David Grisman – mandolin on "Ripple"
- Howard Wales – organ on "Candyman", piano on "Brokedown Palace"
