= The Warfield, San Francisco, California, October 9 & 10, 1980 =

Live album by Grateful Dead
- Released: April 13, 2019
- Recorded: October 9 and 10, 1980
- Venue: Warfield Theatre; San Francisco
- Genre: Rock
- Label: Rhino
- Producer: Grateful Dead

Grateful Dead chronology
Dave's Picks Volume 29 (2019)	The Warfield, San Francisco, California, October 9 & 10, 1980 (2019)	Sage & Spirit (2019)

The Warfield, San Francisco, California, October 9 & 10, 1980 is a live album by the rock band the Grateful Dead. It contains the two sets of acoustic music performed by the Dead on October 9 and 10, 1980 at the Warfield Theatre in San Francisco. It was produced as a two-disc LP in a limited edition of 10,000 copies, and as a two-disc CD in a limited edition of 6,000 copies. It was released on April 13, 2019, in conjunction with Record Store Day.

== Recording ==
In September and October 1980, the Grateful Dead played a series of concerts that had one set of acoustic music followed by two sets of electric music. The tour included 15 shows at the Warfield Theatre in San Francisco, two shows at the Saenger Performing Arts Center in New Orleans, and eight shows at Radio City Music Hall in New York City. The following year they released two live double albums recorded at these concerts – Reckoning, with all acoustic songs, and Dead Set, with all electric songs – as well as a video called Dead Ahead.

The Warfield, San Francisco, California, October 9 & 10, 1980 contains the complete acoustic sets from two of the Warfield concerts.

== Track listing ==
Disc 1 – October 9, 1980
Side A

1. "Dire Wolf" (Jerry Garcia, Robert Hunter) – 3:25
2. "Dark Hollow" (Bill Browning) – 3:43
3. "I've Been All Around This World" (traditional, arranged by Grateful Dead) – 3:52
4. "Cassidy" (Bob Weir, John Perry Barlow) – 6:38
5. "China Doll" (Garcia, Hunter) – 5:31

Side B

1. "On the Road Again" (Reverend Gary Davis) – 3:19
2. "Bird Song" (Garcia, Hunter) – 8:43
3. "The Race Is On" (Don Rollins) – 3:07
4. "Oh Babe, It Ain't No Lie" (Elizabeth Cotten) – 6:34
5. "Ripple" (Garcia, Hunter) – 4:37

Disc 2 – October 10, 1980
Side C

1. "On the Road Again:" (Davis) – 3:10
2. "It Must Have Been the Roses" (Hunter) – 5:55
3. "Monkey and the Engineer" (Jesse Fuller) – 2:50
4. "Jack-a-Roe" (traditional, arranged by Grateful Dead) – 4:14
5. "Dark Hollow" (Browning) – 3:37

Side D

1. "To Lay Me Down" (Garcia, Hunter) – 8:48
2. "Heaven Help the Fool" (Weir, Barlow) – 6:14
3. "Bird Song" (Garcia, Hunter) – 7:56
4. "Ripple" (Garcia, Hunter) – 4:28

== Personnel ==
Grateful Dead

- Jerry Garcia – acoustic guitar, vocals
- Mickey Hart – drums
- Bill Kreutzmann – drums
- Phil Lesh – electric bass
- Brent Mydland – piano, harpsichord, vocals
- Bob Weir – acoustic guitar, vocals

Production

- Produced by Grateful Dead
- Produced for release by David Lemieux
- Mastering: Jeffrey Norman
- Lacquer cutting: Chris Bellman
- Recording: Betty Cantor-Jackson
- Art direction, design: Masaki Koike
- Photos: Jay Blakesberg
