= The Story of the Grateful Dead =

Box set by Grateful Dead
- Released: November 2020
- Recorded: 1969 – 1990
- Genre: Rock
- Labels: Vinyl Me, Please

Grateful Dead chronology
Dave's Picks Volume 36 (2020)	The Story of the Grateful Dead (2020)	Grateful Dead Origins (2021)

The Story of the Grateful Dead is a box set of albums by the rock band the Grateful Dead. It contains eight previously released albums – four recorded in the studio and four recorded live – in vinyl LP format. It comprises 14 discs, on 180-gram colored vinyl. The albums were remastered directly from the original master recordings. The box set includes a booklet of essays by various musicians, each discussing the influence of one of the albums on their own music. The booklet also contains photos of the Grateful Dead. The box set was released by the Vinyl Me, Please record company in November 2020, in a limited edition of 7,500 copies.

The albums contained in the box set were originally released from 1969 to 1990. They are Workingman's Dead, American Beauty, Live/Dead, Europe '72, Wake of the Flood, Terrapin Station, Reckoning, and Without a Net.

The LPs were cut directly from the master recordings using analog-to-analog technology, except Without a Net which has a digital master.

== Albums ==
The albums included in The Story of the Grateful Dead are listed below. For narrative purposes the box set organizes them into four "episodes".

Episode	Title	Year	Recording	Discs	Liner notes by
1	Workingman's Dead	1970	studio	1	David Longstreth
1	American Beauty	1970	studio	1	Jim James
2	Live/Dead	1969	live	2	Avey Tare
2	Europe '72	1972	live	3	Hunter Brown
3	Wake of the Flood	1973	studio	1	Margo Price
3	Terrapin Station	1977	studio	1	Scott Devendorf
4	Reckoning	1981	live	2	John Darnielle
4	Without a Net	1990	live	3	

== Personnel ==
Grateful Dead

- Jerry Garcia – guitar, vocals
- Bob Weir – guitar, vocals
- Phil Lesh – bass, vocals
- Bill Kreutzmann – drums
- Mickey Hart – drums (Workingman's Dead, American Beauty, Live/Dead, Terrapin Station, Reckoning, Without a Net)
- Ron "Pigpen" McKernan – organ, harmonica, percussion, vocals (Workingman's Dead, American Beauty, Live/Dead, Europe '72)
- Tom Constanten – keyboards (Live/Dead)
- Keith Godchaux – keyboards (Europe '72, Wake of the Flood, Terrapin Station)
- Donna Jean Godchaux – vocals (Europe '72, Wake of the Flood, Terrapin Station)
- Brent Mydland – keyboards, vocals (Reckoning, Without a Net)

Production

- Lacquers cut by Chris Bellman
- Liner notes essays written by MC Taylor, David Longstreth, Jim James, Avey Tare, Hunter Brown, Margo Price, Scott Devendorf, John Darnielle, Jenny Conlee
- Photography by Jim Marshall, Jim Anderson, Adrian Boot, Bob Minkin, Jay Blakesburg, Herb Greene, Rosie McGee
- Box and booklet design by Jeremy Dean
