= History of the Grateful Dead, Volume One (Bear's Choice) =

Live album by Grateful Dead
- Released: July 13, 1973
- Recorded: February 13–14, 1970
- Genres: Jam rock, blues, folk rock
- Length: 47:28
- Label: Warner Bros.
- Producer: Owsley Stanley
- Compiler: Owsley Stanley

Grateful Dead chronology
Europe '72 (1972)	History of the Grateful Dead, Volume One (Bear's Choice) (1973)	Wake of the Flood (1973)

Professional ratings
Review scores
Source	Rating
AllMusic	4/5 stars
Christgau's Record Guide	C+
Rolling Stone	Mixed

History of the Grateful Dead, Volume One (Bear's Choice) is a live album by the Grateful Dead. It is their fourth live album and their ninth album overall. Released in July 1973 on Warner Bros. Records, it offers concert highlights recorded February 13 and 14, 1970, at the Fillmore East in New York City. Often known simply as Bear's Choice, the title references band soundman Owsley "Bear" Stanley. It was originally intended to be the first volume of a series.

The album peaked at number 60 on the Billboard 200.

== Recording ==
The album was recorded during a period when the Grateful Dead were playing concerts consisting of electric sets, plus an acoustic set, revisiting their roots as a folk/jug band. Reflecting this approach (though it was ultimately released three years later), the album has an acoustic side and an electric side. As per policy at the time at promoter Bill Graham's Fillmore East, the band played both an early show and a late show. The recordings were culled from the February 13 & 14, 1970 late shows (bonus tracks on reissues include contemporaneous recordings from Graham's Fillmore West, in San Francisco). Dick's Picks Volume 4, an album released in 1996, offers additional material from these same performances.

The original album was recorded and produced by Owsley "Bear" Stanley, the Dead's then-soundman, who chose his favorite tracks. He compiled it as a tribute of sorts to Ron "Pigpen" McKernan, the band's original keyboard player and blues aficionado, who died during the production of the release. As such, it features three songs on which Pigpen sings lead, including all of side two.

Band manager Rock Scully said "Pigpen went out on the stage and sat down in a chair ... it was the only time he ever did it. He sat down and played the bottleneck guitar. We'd been pushing him for years to do it and finally he just got loose enough and comfortable enough with the audience there at the Fillmore to go out and do it. He went out and sat down on the stage—it was Valentine's Day and he had a honey out in the crowd. He went out and played 'Katie Mae' to her. Immediately following that, Bobby (Weir) and Garcia went out and did the same thing. They sat down and played acoustic guitars. They don't do that anymore." (Note: In fact, they had been playing acoustic sets for several months before that night, and Pigpen's performance of 'Katie Mae' didn't start the acoustic set in that show, but rather ended it.)

Though it was something of a contractual obligation, as the band were trying to finish the terms of their recording contract and end their association with Warner Bros., it was compiled as the first volume of either a two-volume set or a series. However, further volumes never came to be as the band were creating their own record label, after which difficulties prevented the release of live archival recordings. Lead guitarist Jerry Garcia explained, "We [had to] give it to them in order to make Europe '72 a triple LP... We ended up giving them four discs instead of just two just to be able to go to Europe. It all goes back to that damn vacation of ours... [It represents] us in early 1970, at a time in our existence when we never made a record. The stuff we were doing at the time never got onto any of our records before now." Drummer Bill Kreutzmann commented, "To fulfill our contract with Warner Brothers, we let Bear put together a live anthology—hence the nickname Bear’s Choice. The official title, History of the Grateful Dead, Volume One, reflects its unofficial intent as a tribute and send-off to Pigpen."

== Release ==
Side one consists of acoustic performances by McKernan, Jerry Garcia, and Bob Weir on country blues and folk covers, with one original from Workingman's Dead. The second side features the entire electric band on blues covers "Smokestack Lightning" by Howlin' Wolf and "Hard to Handle" by Otis Redding.

The parenthetical "Bear's Choice" of the title prevented confusion with a homonymous, non-contractual album, in retail bins at the time. For this reason and due to title length, fans usually refer to the album simply as "Bear's Choice".

The Grateful Dead's "Dancing Bears" first appeared on the back cover of Bear's Choice.

A large complement of iconography is associated with the Grateful Dead. Along with the "Skull & Roses" and dancing terrapins, perhaps the most ubiquitous are the "Lightning Skull/Steal", and the "Dancing Bears", which notably made their first appearance on the front and rear covers, respectively, of this album. Designed by Bob Thomas, the latter have been incorporated into an endless array of both fan-produced and official merchandise and ephemera. Though usually referred to as the "Dancing Bears" they are, in fact, marching and not dancing. The front cover also has the first appearance of the "Good Old Grateful Dead" epithet, circling the "Lightning Skull" graphic.

The album was remastered for compact disc, in 2001, as part of The Golden Road (1965–1973) box set. This version, with four bonus tracks, was given separate release in 2003. The contemporaneous bonus tracks include another one from the February 13, 1970 concert, and three from a week earlier at the Fillmore West in San Francisco. In keeping with the tributary nature of the original record, three of the four tracks feature lead vocals by McKernan.

Bear's Choice was remastered again for a 50th Anniversary Edition, which was released on May 5, 2023. This edition of the album was produced as an LP (on black or colored vinyl) and as a digital download. Unlike previous 50th anniversary editions of Grateful Dead albums, it was not released on CD.

== Track listing ==
Side one
No.	Title	Writer(s)	Recording date and venue	Length
1.	"Katie Mae"	Lightnin' Hopkins	February 13, 1970, Fillmore East	4:46
2.	"Dark Hollow"	Bill Browning	February 14, 1970, Fillmore East	3:30
3.	"I've Been All Around This World"	traditional	February 14, 1970, Fillmore East	4:40
4.	"Wake Up Little Susie"	Felice and Boudleaux Bryant	February 13, 1970, Fillmore East	2:40
5.	"Black Peter"	Jerry Garcia; Robert Hunter	February 13, 1970, Fillmore East	7:20

Side two
No.	Title	Writer(s)	Recording date and venue	Length
1.	"Smokestack Lightning"	Howlin' Wolf	February 13, 1970, Fillmore East	18:00
2.	"Hard to Handle"	Al Bell; Allen Jones; Otis Redding	February 14, 1970, Fillmore East	6:14

2001/2003 reissue bonus tracks
No.	Title	Writer(s)	Recording date and venue	Length
8.	"Good Lovin'"	Rudy Clark; Arthur Resnick	February 13, 1970, Fillmore East	8:56
9.	"Big Boss Man"	Al Smith; Luther Dixon	February 5, 1970, Fillmore West	4:53
10.	"Smokestack Lightning"	Howlin' Wolf	February 8, 1970, Fillmore West	15:11
11.	"Sitting on Top of the World"	Lonnie Chatmon; Walter Vinson	February 8, 1970, Fillmore West	3:20

Notes

- Sides one and two were combined as tracks 1–7 on CD reissues.
- More tracks from the February 13th and 14th shows would later be released on Dick's Picks Volume 4

== Personnel ==
- Jerry Garcia – acoustic and lead guitar, vocals on "Dark Hollow", "I've Been All Around This World", "Wake Up Little Susie", and "Black Peter"; electric guitar and vocals on "Smokestack Lightning" (both versions), "Hard to Handle", "Good Lovin'", "Big Boss Man", and "Sitting on Top of the World"
- Mickey Hart – drums and percussion on "Smokestack Lightning" (both versions), "Hard to Handle", "Good Lovin'", "Big Boss Man", and "Sitting on Top of the World"
- Bill Kreutzmann – drums and percussion on "Smokestack Lightning" (both versions), "Hard to Handle", "Good Lovin'", "Big Boss Man", and "Sitting on Top of the World"
- Phil Lesh – bass guitar and vocals on "Smokestack Lightning" (both versions), "Hard to Handle", "Good Lovin'", "Big Boss Man", and "Sitting on Top of the World"
- Ron "Pigpen" McKernan – acoustic guitar and vocals on "Katie Mae"; organ, percussion, harmonica, and vocals on "Smokestack Lightning" (both versions), "Hard to Handle", "Good Lovin'", "Big Boss Man", and "Sitting on Top of the World"
- Bob Weir – acoustic rhythm guitar and vocals on "Dark Hollow", "I've Been All Around This World", "Wake Up Little Susie", and "Black Peter"; electric guitar and vocals on "Smokestack Lightning" (both versions), "Hard to Handle", "Good Lovin'", "Big Boss Man", and "Sitting on Top of the World"

Technical personnel

- James Austin – production (reissue)
- Joe Gastwirt – mastering consultancy (reissue)
- David Lemieux – production (reissue)
- Peter McQuaid – executive production for Grateful Dead Productions
- Owsley Stanley – production

== Charts ==
Chart (1973)	Peak position
Canadian RPM 100 Albums	88
US Billboard Top LP's & Tape	60
US Cash Box Top 100 Albums	48
US Record World Album Chart	70
