= Star Magic =

Talent management agency division of ABS-CBN Corporation

ABS-CBN Center for Communication Arts, Inc. Showbiz Magic, Inc.
- The logo of Star Magic (2021–present)
- Trade name: Star Magic
- Formerly: Discovery (1988–1992); ABS-CBN Talent Center/ABS-CBN Talent Development and Management Center (1992–2007); Star Circle (2000–2004)
- Type: Division
- Industry: Talent agency
- Founded: 1988; 38 years ago
- Founders: Lino Brocka; Charo Santos-Concio; Freddie M. Garcia; Johnny Manahan
- Headquarters: ABS-CBN Broadcasting Center, Diliman, Quezon City, Philippines
- Area served: Philippines
- Key people: Laurenti M. Dyogi
- Products: Music and entertainment
- Services: Talent management
- Parent: ABS-CBN Corporation
- Divisions: Star Magic Records (under Star Music); Star Magic Studio (in partnership with Star Cinema, Mavx Production, and Regal Entertainment); Star Magic Digital Artists Agency
- Website: starmagicph.com

ABS-CBN Center for Communication Arts, Inc. or Showbiz Magic, Inc. (doing business as Star Magic, formerly known as Discovery, ABS-CBN Talent Center/ABS-CBN Talent Development and Management Center and Star Circle, and also stylized as StarMagic without space in between words) is a Philippine talent management agency owned by ABS-CBN Corporation based in Quezon City, Metro Manila. Founded in 1988, Star Magic has been one of the Philippines' leading talent management agencies for decades, and has managed many of the country's top stars.

== History ==
Star Magic was established in 1988 as Discovery when Charo Santos-Concio, Freddie M. Garcia, Johnny Manahan, and director Lino Brocka formed a talent management to provide actors on endorsements and projects in the Philippine television, cinema and music industry, and create a stable of new stars exclusively for the network. Discovery changed its name to ABS-CBN Talent Center/ABS-CBN Talent Development and Management Center on May 12, 1992, and was used until 2007, then to Star Magic in 1995, and to Star Circle in 2000, before reverting to the third name in 2004.

On June 26, 2011, the company celebrated its 19th anniversary on ASAP Rocks. It also launched the new music video with its current artists.

In 2019, Star Magic hosted a Mobile Legends: Bang Bang event with 4 teams of celebrities.

In 2020, following the expiration and subsequent denial of ABS-CBN's broadcast franchise, Manahan and Mariole Alberto stepped down, with Manahan moving to Brightlight Productions and later to Sparkle GMA Artist Center and MediaQuest Holdings. Laurenti Dyogi, who also leads ABS-CBN Studios, was named the talent agency's new head which took effect on January 1, 2021.

In 2021, Star Magic announced during its Black Pen Day Signing that they will be launching Star Magic Records, a sub label under ABS-CBN Music; Star Magic Studio, which will create content for Star Magic artists; and Star Magic Digital Artist Agency, as well as relaunching ABS-CBN Corporation's theatre arm Teatro Kapamilya.

In August 2022, certain Star Magic artists toured the United States as part of their 30th anniversary celebration, staging shows in Kings Theater, Brooklyn, The Warfield, San Francisco, and in the Saban Theatre, Beverly Hills. Prior to the US tour, the artists (except singer-songwriter SAB) staged a kick-off event at the Newport Performing Arts Theater in Resorts World Manila.

== See also ==
- List of Star Magic former and current talents
- Rise Artists Studio
- Sparkle GMA Artist Center
