= Black Peter (song) =

Song by Grateful Dead

from the album Workingman's Dead
- Released: June 14, 1970
- Length: 5:42
- Label: Warner Bros.
- Composer: Jerry Garcia
- Lyricist: Robert Hunter
- Producers: Bob Matthews; Betty Cantor; Grateful Dead

"Black Peter" is a song by the American rock band the Grateful Dead, released as the sixth track on the band's fourth studio album Workingman's Dead (1970).

== Overview ==
The lyrics of "Black Peter" were written by Robert Hunter after an LSD experience in June 1969 after his apple juice was reportedly dosed without his knowledge with around $50,000 worth of crystal LSD. The song's lyrics concern a man on his deathbed who doesn't know how long he will live, while the man's friends gather around him and attempt to make conversation with the man, but he doesn't want to, only asking rhetorical questions such as "who can the weather command?", "who can command the weather?" and "Who can be commanded by the weather?". Hunter said in his book A Box of Rain that "I wrote this as a brisk piece like Kershaw's 'Louisiana Man.' Garcia took it seriously, though, dressing it in subtle changes and a mournful tempo. The bridge verse—'See here how everything lead up to this day...' —was written after the restructuring of the piece and reflects the additional depth of - "Black Queen" possibility provided for the song by his treatment." The song became a staple of the Dead's concerts of the early 1970's. Many Deadheads have theorized the song was written from the perspective of the Dutch folklore character of the same name as the song. The song had been reportedly been performed by the Dead nearly 350 times before their breakup.

== Release and reception ==
In a review of the song for AllMusic, Matthew Greenwald wrote that it has a "laid-back, almost Don Williams-like ballad [..] quite evocative of a barroom at three in the morning." adding that "The mournful melody is blues-based, yet it also has strong elements of both gospel and country." Glide magazine said in a review of Dave's Picks Volume 24, which includes a live version of the song recorded on August 25, 1972 that "Even the deliberate balladry of "Black Peter" has an unusual resonance and not just in the stirring tones of Lesh's bass: Robert Hunter's lyrics echo with profound truth".

== Cover versions ==
A cover by Anohni featuring yMusic was included on the 2016 tribute album Day of the Dead.
