= Sage & Spirit =

Compilation album by Grateful Dead
- Released: April 3, 2019
- Recorded: 1970 – 1980
- Genre: Rock
- Label: Rhino
- Producer: Grateful Dead

Grateful Dead chronology
| The Warfield, San Francisco, California, October 9 & 10, 1980 (2019) | Sage & Spirit (2019) | Dave's Picks Volume 30 (2019) |

Sage & Spirit is a compilation album by the rock band the Grateful Dead. It contains ten songs – eight recorded in the studio and two live – selected from various albums. It was produced as a vinyl LP in a limited edition of 4,000 copies, and released on April 3, 2019, in conjunction with Record Store Day.

The tracks on Sage & Spirit were excerpted from the albums Workingman's Dead (1970), American Beauty (1970), Europe '72 (1972), Wake of the Flood (1973), From the Mars Hotel (1974), Blues for Allah (1975), Shakedown Street (1978), and Go to Heaven (1980).

Sage & Spirit was a cross-marketing promotion with Dogfish Head Brewery. The cover of the album depicts a dancing bear holding a mug of beer. Grateful Dead Productions and Dogfish Head Brewery had previously collaborated on a beer called American Beauty, a pale ale brewed with granola and honey.

== Track listing ==
Side A

1. "Sugar Magnolia" (Bob Weir, Robert Hunter) – 3:17 – from American Beauty
2. "Eyes of the World" (Jerry Garcia, Hunter) – 5:20 – from Wake of the Flood
3. "Lost Sailor" (Weir, John Perry Barlow) – 5:54 – from Go to Heaven
4. "Saint of Circumstance" (Weir, Barlow) – 5:40 – from Go to Heaven
5. "High Time" (Garcia, Hunter) – 5:12 – from Workingman's Dead

Side B

1. "Sage & Spirit" (Weir) – 3:04 – from Blues for Allah
2. "Jack Straw" (Weir, Hunter) – 4:46 – from Europe '72
3. "Unbroken Chain" (Phil Lesh, Robert Petersen) – 6:45 – from From the Mars Hotel
4. "Brown-Eyed Women" (Garcia, Hunter) – 4:45 – from Europe '72
5. "If I Had the World to Give" (Garcia, Hunter) – 4:50 – from Shakedown Street

== Personnel ==
Grateful Dead

- Jerry Garcia – guitar, vocals
- Bob Weir – guitar, vocals
- Phil Lesh – bass guitar, vocals
- Bill Kreutzmann – drums
- Mickey Hart – drums (1, 3–6, 10)
- Ron "Pigpen" McKernan – organ on "Brown Eyed Women" and percussion on "Jack Straw"
- Keith Godchaux – keyboards (2, 6–10)
- Brent Mydland – keyboards, vocals (3–4)
- Donna Jean Godchaux – vocals (2, 6–10)

Production

- Produced by Grateful Dead
- Produced for release by David Lemieux
- Mastering: David Glasser
- Lacquer cutting: Chris Bellman
- Cover illustration: Michael Hacker
- Design, layout: Rory Wilson
