= Dick's Picks Volume 4 =

Live album by Grateful Dead
- Released: February 23, 1996
- Recorded: February 13–14, 1970
- Genres: Rock, folk rock, psychedelic rock
- Length: 189:46
- Label: Grateful Dead

Grateful Dead chronology
Dick's Picks Volume 3 (1995)	Dick's Picks Volume 4 (1996)	Dick's Picks Volume 5 (1996)

Dick's Picks Volume 4 is the fourth live album in the Dick's Picks series of releases by the Grateful Dead. It was recorded on February 13 and February 14, 1970, at the Fillmore East in New York City, and released in February 1996. It was the first of the Dick's Picks CDs to have three discs. It was also the first Dead album to include the song "Mason's Children".

Dick's Picks Volume 4 was the second album of live material from the 2/13/70 and 2/14/70 concerts. The first was History of the Grateful Dead, Volume One (Bear's Choice), which was released in 1973.

The Grateful Dead played three sets of music at each of these concerts — a relatively short electric set, an acoustic set, and another, longer electric set, followed by an encore. Dick's Picks Volume 4 contains the complete third sets of both shows, plus two additional tracks.

== The Fillmore East shows ==
On February 11, 13, and 14, 1970, the Grateful Dead — along with the Allman Brothers Band and Love — performed at Bill Graham's Fillmore East auditorium in New York City. The February 13 and February 14 Dead shows were widely regarded as among the band's best concerts, even before the release of Dick's Picks Volume 4. In addition to the evidence offered by Bear's Choice, high quality soundboard bootlegs of the concerts had been in circulation for quite some time. In a 1993 poll of Grateful Dead tape traders, based on the concert recordings then in circulation, the 2/13/70 show was ranked #2 on the list of all-time favorite Dead tapes, and 2/14/70 was #17. (The May 8, 1977, concert at Cornell University's Barton Hall received the top ranking.) The same poll rated the 2/13/70 versions of "Dark Star", "The Other One", and "Turn On Your Love Light" as the best ever. (The "Dark Star" played on August 27, 1972, in Veneta, Oregon, was ranked #2. The February 27, 1969, version from the Fillmore West, included in Live/Dead, was #9.)

Selections from the Allman Brothers Band's performances at this set of concerts were released as the album Fillmore East, February 1970.

== Enclosure and liner notes ==
Dick's Picks Volume 4 is the first release in the series to include an enclosure. Consisting of a single sheet of paper folded into thirds, it is six pages long and about the same size as the CD case.

The front page duplicates the cover of the CD and the back shows a photo of the venue. On the inside, the first page lists the contents of and credits for the release and next to that is a full-page black-and-white photograph of the band performing. The last two pages contain liner notes.

=== Liner notes by Bear ===
The liner notes were written by Owsley "Bear" Stanley, who recorded the show. This short essay briefly reviews the place these shows hold in the band's history and spends some time discussing the sound equipment the band used at the time.

Bear writes that the PA system "worked pretty well most of the time" but that "Monitors continued to be a vexation until 1978." He goes on to describe the system used for the shows in some detail to "help those technically inclined to understand why this recording sounds the way it does."

Following these technical notes, the author goes on to make some personal observations, noting that "Taping was just something that I always did and the performance was always more important than getting the tape right." He then mentions that the Allman Brothers also played during these shows, and "Everyone was having a real good time."

Bear closes with some nostalgic musings, stating that "Listening to these tapes again after so many years was a real treat for me, remembering what a good time we all had in those early days of youth and hijinks."

== Critical reception ==
Professional ratings
Review scores
Source	Rating
Allmusic	5/5 stars
The Music Box	5/5 stars
Rolling Stone	5/5 stars

Dick's Picks Volume 4 received a rating of five stars out of five from Rolling Stone, The Music Box magazine, and Allmusic.

Greg Kot of Rolling Stone wrote, "But when the early Dead were at their best, few American bands were better in concert. Exhibit A is Volume Four, which culls highlights from two masterly 1970 performances at the Fillmore East. Here the full range of the band's arsenal is represented: the luminous 'Dark Star', a raging 'Not Fade Away', the sheer nastiness of McKernan on his showpiece, 'Turn On Your Love Light'."

In The Music Box, John Metzger said, "I don't think I need to tell anyone about the performance of the Grateful Dead on February 13 – 14, 1970, as these have long been fan favorites.... If you have never heard the February 13 performance of Dark Star / That's It for the Other One / Lovelight, you must be living in a cave or have never seen the Grateful Dead. It's one of the most amazing performances they ever did. Over 90 minutes of pure bliss that is sure to convert the unconverted."

William Ruhlmann of Allmusic wrote, "It isn't just the set list that makes this a legendary show, it's the playing: amazing interaction among the players on every song, with Garcia noodling his way to nirvana. While it would be an exaggeration to say that if you own this three-CD, three-hour-and-ten-minute album you have all you need of the Grateful Dead on disc, the overstatement is only slight."

On Jambands.com, Dan Alford wrote, "This performance really needs no introduction; it's one of the most famous two night stands in the Grateful Dead's history, and if you don't think 5/8/77 is the best GD performance, it's possible you think 2/13/70 is.... Easily one of the best moments of the 30 year trip."

== Grayfolded ==
Over 14 minutes of the 2/13/70 version of "Dark Star" was included on the Grateful Dead / John Oswald plunderphonics collaboration project Grayfolded. The section of music used was the jam in between the first and second verse, affectionately called the "Feelin' Groovy Jam" by Deadheads, because of the musical similarity to Simon & Garfunkel's "The 59th Street Bridge Song (Feelin' Groovy)". The section of Grayfolded where this can be found is on Disc 2, track 2 called "73rd Star Bridge Sonata".

== Set lists ==
The concert set lists for the 2/13/70 and 2/14/70 shows at the Fillmore East were:

- February 13, 1970
  - Early show: "Cold Rain and Snow", "Beat It On Down The Line", "Good Lovin' ", "Mama Tried" → "Black Peter", "Hard To Handle", "St. Stephen" → "Not Fade Away", "Casey Jones"
  - First set (electric): "China Cat Sunflower" → "I Know You Rider", "Me and My Uncle", "Dire Wolf", "Smokestack Lightning"^{[b]}
  - Second set (acoustic): "The Monkey and the Engineer", "Sadie", "Wake Up Little Susie"^{[b]}, "Black Peter"^{[b]}, "Uncle John's Band", "Katie Mae"^{[b]}
  - Third set (electric): "Dark Star"^{[a]} → "That's It for the Other One"^{[a]} → "Turn On Your Love Light"^{[a]}
  - Encore: "We Bid You Goodnight"
- February 14, 1970
  - Early show: "Cold Rain and Snow", "Dark Star"^{[c]} > "St. Stephen" → "The Eleven" → "Turn On Your Lovelight"
  - First set (electric): "Casey Jones"^{[a]}, "Mama Tried", "Hard to Handle"^{[b]}
  - Second set (acoustic): "The Monkey and the Engineer", "Dark Hollow"^{[b]}, "I've Been All Around this World"^{[b]}, "Wake Up Little Susie", "Black Peter", "Uncle John's Band", "Katie Mae"
  - Third set (electric): "Dancing in the Street"^{[a]}, "China Cat Sunflower"^{[a]} → "I Know You Rider"^{[a]} > "High Time"^{[a]}, "Dire Wolf"^{[a]}, "Alligator"^{[a]} > "Drums"^{[a]} → "Me and My Uncle"^{[a]} → "Not Fade Away"^{[a]} → "Mason's Children"^{[a]} → "Caution (Do Not Stop On Tracks)"^{[a]} → "Feedback"^{[a]}
  - Encore: "We Bid You Goodnight"^{[a]}

^{[a]} appears on Dick's Picks Volume 4
^{[b]} appears on Bear's Choice
^{[c]} appears on Long Strange Trip

== Caveat emptor ==
Each volume of Dick's Picks has its own "caveat emptor" label, advising the listener of the sound quality of the recording. The label for Volume 4 reads:

"This compact disc has been digitally remastered directly from the original half track 7 1/2 ips analog tape. It is a snapshot of history, not a modern professional recording, and may therefore exhibit some technical anomalies and the unavoidable effects of the ravages of time."

== Track listing ==
Disc one

February 14 – first set:

1. Introduction by Zacherle – 1:51
2. "Casey Jones" (Jerry Garcia, Robert Hunter) – 4:29

February 14 – third set:

3. "Dancing in the Street" (William "Mickey" Stevenson, Marvin Gaye, Ivy Jo Hunter) – 9:30
4. "China Cat Sunflower" (Garcia, Hunter) – 5:09 →
5. "I Know You Rider" (traditional, arr. Grateful Dead) – 5:04 →
6. "High Time" (Garcia, Hunter) – 6:51
7. "Dire Wolf" (Garcia, Hunter) – 4:23

February 13 – third set:

8. "Dark Star" (Garcia, Mickey Hart, Bill Kreutzmann, Phil Lesh, Ron "Pigpen" McKernan, Bob Weir, Hunter) – 29:41 →

- Dark Star – 18:20 →
- Feelin' Groovy Jam (Paul Simon, arr. Grateful Dead) – 3:05 →
- Dark Star – 8:08 →

Disc two

February 13 – third set, continued:

1. "That's It for the Other One" (Grateful Dead) – 30:07 →

- Cryptical Envelopment (Garcia) – 1:55 →
- Drums (Hart, Kreutzmann) – 7:36 →
- The Other One (Weir, Kreutzmann) – 13:47 →
- Cryptical Envelopment (reprise) – 6:39 →

2. "Turn On Your Love Light" (Joe Scott, Deadric Malone) – 30:27

Disc three

February 14 – third set, continued:

1. "Alligator" (Lesh, McKernan, Hunter) – 3:55 →
2. "Drums" (Hart, Kreutzmann) – 12:31 →
3. "Me and My Uncle" (Phillips) – 3:14 →
4. "Not Fade Away" (Hardin, Petty) – 13:56 →
5. "Mason's Children" (Garcia, Lesh, Weir, Hunter) – 3:53 →
6. "Caution (Do Not Stop On Tracks)" (Grateful Dead) – 14:25 →
7. "Feedback" (Grateful Dead) – 8:40 →
8. "We Bid You Goodnight" (traditional) – 2:00

== Personnel ==
Grateful Dead

- Jerry Garcia - lead guitar, vocals
- Mickey Hart - drums
- Bill Kreutzmann - drums
- Phil Lesh - electric bass, vocals
- Ron "Pigpen" McKernan - organ, percussion, vocals
- Bob Weir - guitar, vocals

Production

- Owsley "Bear" Stanley - recording, liner notes
- Dick Latvala - tape archivist
- Jeffrey Norman - CD mastering
- Amalie R. Rothschild - photography
- Gecko Graphics - design
