= Dave's Picks Volume 23 =

2017 live album by the Grateful Dead

Live album by Grateful Dead
- Released: August 1, 2017
- Recorded: January 22, 1978
- Venue: McArthur Court
- Genre: Rock
- Length: 167:54
- Label: Rhino
- Producer: Grateful Dead

Grateful Dead chronology
Long Strange Trip (2017)	Dave's Picks Volume 23 (2017)	Dave's Picks Volume 24 (2017)

Dave's Picks Volume 23 is a three-CD live album by the rock band the Grateful Dead. It contains the complete concert recorded at McArthur Court at the University of Oregon in Eugene, Oregon on January 22, 1978. It was released on August 1, 2017, in a limited edition of 16,500 copies.

Dave's Picks Volume 23 was released as a five-disc LP on April 28, 2023, in a limited edition of 5,000 copies.

== Critical reception ==
Professional ratings
Review scores
Source	Rating
AllMusic	4/5 stars

On AllMusic, Timothy Monger wrote, "Long-running Grateful Dead archival series Dave's Picks delivers a true gem on Vol. 23, featuring what many die-hard Deadheads claim to be one of the best shows of 1978... Emerging from the wild and jazzy cosmos of 'Space', Garcia and keyboardist Keith Godchaux deftly segue into a particularly spirited 'St. Stephen', which could have easily closed out an already epic show, but instead sets up a relentlessly energetic half-hour finale of 'Not Fade Away', 'Around and Around', and 'U.S. Blues'.... The newly uncovered Betty Cantor-Jackson recordings from this night finally put all the sonic pieces together on this excellent release."

In Glide Magazine, Doug Collette said, "... it was during this performance Jerry Garcia quoted the theme of Close Encounters of the Third Kind. Titillating but ultimately ephemeral as is that reference, it is representative of the element of surprise pervading this show.... All of which, of course, comes through with equal punch and depth on this recording of Betty Cantor-Jackson’s.... With additional official releases of this era, this period of Grateful Dead history elevates further in their canon of work."

== Track listing ==
Disc 1

First set

1. "New Minglewood Blues" (traditional, arranged by Grateful Dead) – 6:20
2. "Dire Wolf" (Jerry Garcia, Robert Hunter) – 4:35
3. "Cassidy" (Bob Weir, John Barlow) – 5:08
4. "Peggy-O" (traditional, arranged by Grateful Dead) – 7:23
5. "El Paso" (Marty Robbins) – 5:21
6. "Tennessee Jed" (Garcia, Hunter) – 9:06
7. "Jack Straw" (Weir, Hunter) – 6:08
8. "Row Jimmy" (Garcia, Hunter) – 10:37
9. "The Music Never Stopped" (Weir, Barlow) – 8:08

Disc 2

Second set

1. "Bertha" → (Garcia, Hunter) – 6:52
2. "Good Lovin'" (Rudy Clark, Arthur Resnick) – 6:26
3. "Ship of Fools" (Garcia, Hunter) – 7:33
4. "Samson and Delilah" (traditional, arranged by Weir) – 7:48

Disc 3

1. "Terrapin Station" → (Garcia, Hunter) – 11:08
2. "Drums" → (Mickey Hart, Bill Kreutzmann) – 7:51
3. "The Other One" → (Weir, Kreutzmann) – 16:57
4. "Space" → (Garcia, Phil Lesh, Weir) – 3:52
5. "St. Stephen" → (Garcia, Lesh, Hunter) – 7:39
6. "Not Fade Away" → (Norman Petty, Charles Hardin) – 14:09
7. "Around and Around" (Chuck Berry) – 8:57

Encore

8. "U.S. Blues" (Garcia, Hunter) – 5:53

== Personnel ==
Grateful Dead

- Jerry Garcia – guitar, vocals
- Donna Jean Godchaux – vocals
- Keith Godchaux – keyboards
- Mickey Hart – drums
- Bill Kreutzmann – drums
- Phil Lesh – bass, vocals
- Bob Weir – guitar, vocals

Production

- Produced by Grateful Dead
- Produced for release by David Lemieux
- Mastering: Jeffrey Norman
- Recording: Betty Cantor-Jackson
- Art direction, design: Steve Vance
- Cover art: Dave Van Patten
- Photos: Bruce Polonsky
- Liner notes essay "McArthur Court Is Melting in the Oort: Close Encounters in Eugene": Jesse Jarnow
- Executive producer: Mark Pinkus
- Associate producers: Doran Tyson, Ivette Ramos
- Tape research: Michael Wesley Johnson
- Tapes provided through the assistance of ABCD Enterprises, LLC

== Charts ==
Chart (2017)	Peak position
US Billboard 200	30
US Top Rock Albums (Billboard)	5
