= Dave's Picks Volume 37 =

Live album by Grateful Dead
- Released: January 29, 2021
- Recorded: April 15, 1978
- Venue: College of William & Mary; Williamsburg, Virginia
- Genre: Rock
- Length: 233:00
- Label: Rhino
- Producer: Grateful Dead

Grateful Dead chronology
Grateful Dead Origins (2021)	Dave's Picks Volume 37 (2021)	Dave's Picks Volume 38 (2021)

Dave's Picks Volume 37 is a three-CD live album by the rock band the Grateful Dead. It contains the complete concert recorded on April 15, 1978, at the College of William & Mary in Williamsburg, Virginia, as well as selections from the April 18 concert at the Civic Arena in Pittsburgh, Pennsylvania. It was released on January 29, 2021, in a limited edition of 25,000 copies.

== Critical reception ==
On AllMusic, Timothy Monger wrote, "The ongoing Grateful Dead archival series Dave's Picks offers up its 37th volume with a fairly rollicking show from the spring of 1978. Recorded by the inimitable Betty Cantor-Jackson, Vol. 37 finds the band at Williamsburg, Virginia's College of William and Mary on April 15th where they chug through two lengthy sets of highlights..."

== Track listing ==
Disc 1

First set:

1. "Mississippi Half-Step Uptown Toodeloo" (Jerry Garcia, Robert Hunter) – 10:43
2. "Passenger" (Phil Lesh, Peter Monk) – 4:52
3. "Friend of the Devil" (Garcia, John Dawson, Hunter) – 7:04
4. "El Paso" (Marty Robbins) – 4:53
5. "Brown-Eyed Women" (Garcia, Hunter) – 5:30
6. "Let It Grow" (Bob Weir, John Perry Barlow) – 14:32
7. "Deal" (Garcia, Hunter) – 7:15

Second set:

8. "Bertha" > (Garcia, Hunter) – 6:01
9. "Good Lovin'" (Rudy Clark, Arthur Resnick) – 7:04
10. "Candyman" (Garcia, Hunter) – 7:39

Disc 2

1. "Sunrise" > (Donna Jean Godchaux) – 4:12
2. "Playing in the Band" > (Weir, Mickey Hart, Hunter) – 14:25
3. "Rhythm Devils" > (Hart, Bill Kreutzmann) – 11:40
4. "Not Fade Away" > (Norman Petty, Charles Hardin) – 13:30
5. "Morning Dew" (Bonnie Dobson, Tim Rose) – 10:47
6. "Around and Around" (Chuck Berry) – 8:41

Encore:

7. "One More Saturday Night" (Weir) – 4:59

Bonus tracks – April 18, 1978:

8. "Lazy Lightning" > (Weir, Barlow)– 4:06
9. "Supplication" (Weir, Barlow) – 5:58

Disc 3

1. "Sugaree" (Garcia, Hunter) – 15:02
2. "Tennessee Jed" (Garcia, Hunter) – 9:11
3. "Scarlet Begonias" > (Garcia, Hunter) – 13:51
4. "Dancing in the Street" > (William "Mickey" Stevenson, Marvin Gaye, Ivy Jo Hunter) – 13:33
5. "Rhythm Devils" > (Hart, Kreutzmann) – 1:16
6. "Samson and Delilah" (traditional, arranged by Weir) – 7:23
7. "Terrapin Station" (Garcia, Hunter) – 10:59
8. "Around and Around" (Berry) – 8:34

Note: The song list for the April 18, 1978, concert at the Civic Arena in Pittsburgh, Pennsylvania was:

First set: "New Minglewood Blues" · "Sugaree"^{[A]} · "Looks Like Rain" · "Dire Wolf" · "Beat It On Down the Line" · "Loser" · "El Paso" · "Tennessee Jed"^{[A]} · "Lazy Lightning"^{[A]} · "Supplication"^{[A]}

Second set: "Scarlet Begonias"^{[A]} · "Dancing in the Street"^{[A]} · "Rhythm Devils"^{[B]} · "Samson and Delilah"^{[A]} · "Terrapin Station"^{[A]} · "Around and Around"^{[A]}

Encore: "U.S. Blues"

[A] Included in Dave's Picks Volume 37
[B] Partially included in Dave's Picks Volume 37

== Personnel ==
Grateful Dead

- Jerry Garcia – guitar, vocals
- Donna Jean Godchaux – vocals
- Keith Godchaux – keyboards
- Mickey Hart – drums
- Bill Kreutzmann – drums
- Phil Lesh – bass
- Bob Weir – guitar, vocals

Production

- Produced by Grateful Dead
- Produced for release by David Lemieux
- Mastering: Jeffrey Norman
- Recording: Betty Cantor-Jackson
- Art direction, design: Steve Vance
- Cover art: Helen Rebecchi Kennedy
- Photos: James R. Anderson, Bob Minkin, Rob Bleetstein
- Liner notes essay: Rob Bleetstein

== Charts ==
Chart performance for Dave's Picks Volume 37
Chart (2021)	Peak position
US Billboard 200	19
US Top Rock Albums (Billboard)	2
