= Cumberland Blues =

Song by Grateful Dead

from the album Workingman's Dead
- Released: June 14, 1970
- Length: 3:15
- Label: Warner Bros.
- Composers: Jerry Garcia; Phil Lesh
- Lyricist: Robert Hunter
- Producers: Bob Matthews; Betty Cantor; Grateful Dead

"Cumberland Blues" is a song by the American rock band Grateful Dead, released on their fourth studio album Workingman's Dead (1970). The song is about working down in the mines and often seen as an ode to blue collarism.

== Background and composition ==
"Cumberland Blues" is often seen as the Grateful Dead's "ode-to-blue collarism" due to its lyrics about working in a mine, with an up-tempo beat that nods to the struggles of basic survival. Its music was written by Jerry Garcia and Phil Lesh, while the lyrics were written by Robert Hunter. The "Melinda" mentioned in the lyrics comes from someone Robert Hunter knew in high school. The "Cumberland Mine" is the name of an actual mine in Nova Scotia. Garcia has said of his banjo playing: "My style has been characterized as picking every note, and that's a holdover from banjo[.]" Matthew Greenwald of AllMusic believes that there is little doubt the band was inspired by Crosby, Stills and Nash. Robert Hunter recalled in A Box of Rain that "The best compliment I ever had on a lyric was from an old guy who'd worked at the Cumberland mine. He said, 'I wonder what the guy who wrote this song would've thought if he'd ever known something like the Grateful Dead was gonna do it."

== Release and reception ==
In a ranking of the band's 10 best songs, The Guardian's Chris Hardman placed it at number 6, and states that "Hunter tells of an actual Cumberland miner who wasn’t keen on the idea of the Dead playing what he thought was an old song from the area – although the gradual mood and musical changes mark it out from most country songs." Matthew Greenwald states in the opening of his review that "A sprightly country melody and a breezy tempo are the vehicles for "Cumberland Blues," one of the finest songs on the Workingman's Dead album." During the Fare Thee Well concerts, Trey Anastasio performed vocals for "Cumberland Blues" and "Cream Puff War".

== Cover versions ==
Charles Beadley and the Menahan Street Band performed a cover version of "Cumberland Blues" for the 2016 Day of the Dead tribute album.
