= Noah Van Sciver =

American cartoonist (born 1984)

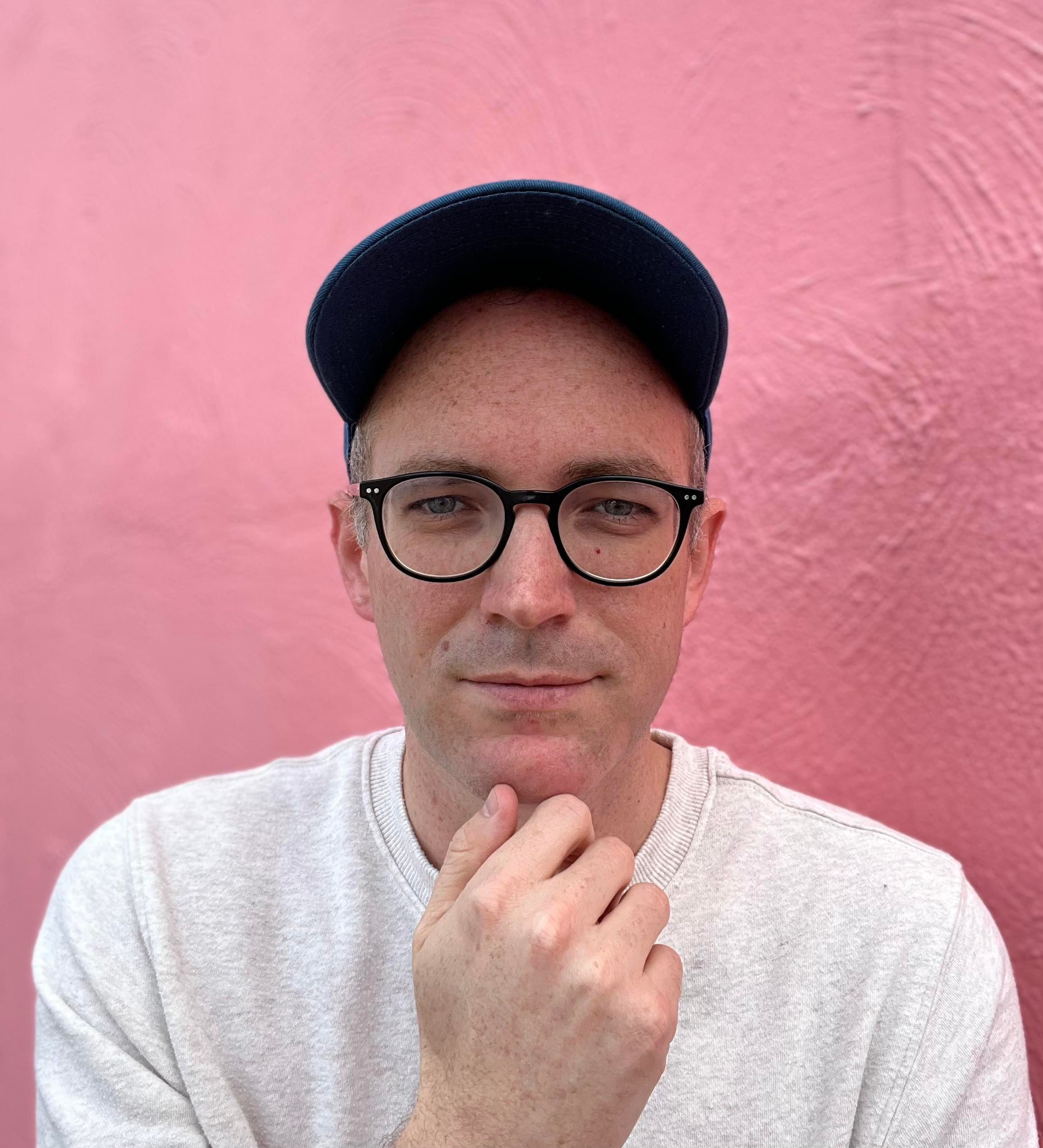
- Born: July 7, 1984 (age 42) Merchantville, New Jersey, U.S.
- Notable works: Blammo; 4 Questions; The Hypo; Saint Cole; Fante Bukowski; My Hot Date

Noah Van Sciver (born July 7, 1984) is an independent American cartoonist who resides in Columbia, South Carolina.

== Early life ==
Van Sciver grew up in a large family in New Jersey. A self-taught artist, he was influenced by many comics, including Ralph Snart Adventures and comics by Joe Matt and R. Crumb. He and his family were members of the Church of Jesus Christ of Latter-day Saints (LDS Church), but he is no longer a member. His brother Ethan is a comic book artist and an internet personality.

== Comics ==
Van Sciver began producing his one-person anthology Blammo in 2006, originally selling them for one dollar. His 4 Questions strip in Denver's alternative weekly, Westword, helped publicize his work when he started publishing it in 2007. After four issues of Blammo, Kilgore Books & Comics published subsequent issues.

In 2010, he briefly campaigned to write and draw Howard the Duck as part of Marvel's Strange Tales series, but was turned down.

His short story "Abby's Road," which originally appeared in Blammo #6, was selected for the Best American Comics 2012 anthology. Van Sciver's work has appeared in Mad magazine, and has been featured in The Comics Journal, Mome, and Mineshaft.

In October 2012, Fantagraphics Books published The Hypo: The Melancholic Young Lincoln, a narrative biography of Abraham Lincoln that spans the years 1837–1842. The Hypo, Van Sciver's first full-length graphic novel, earned positive critical praise, and made it onto several "best-of" lists for 2012, including MTV Geek (#3), Boing Boing (tied #3), Publishers Weekly Critic's Poll (#4), and was ranked as one of the Best Graphic Novels of 2012 by the Library Journal.

In 2015, Fantagraphics released two Van Sciver graphic novels, Saint Cole and Fante Bukowski. Van Sciver stated in an interview that he based the character Fante Bukowski's experiences partially on his own experiences. The character Fante Bukowski is an aspiring writer hungry for recognition, and his name is a combination of the surnames of John Fante and Charles Bukowski. In a 2018 interview, Van Sciver said that he did not have plans to draw more Fante Bukowski books.

Also in 2015, Kilgore Books released Van Sciver's autobiographical mini comic My Hot Date, which won the 'Best Story' Ignatz Award at the Small Press Expo.

For the 2015–2016 school year, Van Sciver was a fellow at the Center for Cartoon Studies in White River Junction, VT. He stopped publishing 4 Questions in 2015.

In Van Sciver's autobiographical comic, One Dirty Tree (2018), he examined his childhood. He reported that his family was not happy with the comic, and Van Sciver felt bad for making his father a villain, when his father suffers from mental illness. John Wenzel at The Know described the comic's imagery as "uncanny, [and] deceptively casual."

Van Sciver drew the artwork for the graphic novel Grateful Dead Origins, which was written by Chris Miskiewicz. The book tells the story of the early days of the rock band the Grateful Dead. It was published by Z2 Comics in 2020.

Van Sciver uses Photoshop along with traditional media like rapidograph pens, Higgins inks, colored pencils and watercolors. He keeps regular hours drawing, working each day from 9am until 5pm. He has used social media like Patreon and Twitter in the past to get immediate feedback on his work. He moved to Columbia, South Carolina, in 2018.

== Awards ==
Van Sciver won the 2016 Ignatz award for Outstanding Story with the one-shot stand alone comic My Hot Date. He has been nominated for an Ignatz award many times:

2010 Outstanding Comic - Blammo #6 (Kilgore)
2012 Outstanding Minicomic - The Death of Elijah Lovejoy (2D Cloud)
2014 Outstanding Comic - Blammo #8 (Kilgore), 2015 Outstanding Graphic Novel - Saint Cole (Fantagraphics)
2015 Outstanding Artist - Saint Cole (Fantagraphics)
2015 Outstanding Graphic Novel - Saint Cole (Fantagraphics)
2016 Outstanding Artist - Disquiet (Fantagraphics)
2016 Outstanding Story - My Hot Date (Kilgore)
2020 Outstanding Collection - The Complete Works of Fante Bukowski (Fantagraphics)

In 2016, his graphic novel Fante Bukowski was nominee for a Best Writer/Artist Eisner Award.

Van Sciver has been shortlisted for two AML Awards from the Association for Mormon Letters: in 2015 for My Hot Date and 2018 for One Dirty Tree. He received the AML Award for One Dirty Tree.

== Bibliography ==
The following is a mostly complete list of comics which contain solely content by Van Sciver. Collaborations, anthologies, and collections are listed in the table that follows.

COMIC	YEAR	PUBLISHER	NOTES
The War	1989	Self-published	Features Spider-Man, Ziggy, and Gumby.
Blammo Funnies	2006-2007	Self-published	1 (2006) & 2 (2007). Forerunner to Blammo.
Blammo	2007-2018	Self-published & Kilgore Books Comics	Self-published: 1 (2007), 2 (2008), 3 (2009), 4 (2009), 7.5 (2011). Kilgore Books & Comics: 5 (2009), 6 (2010), 7 (2011), 8 (2013),8 1/2 (2014), 9 (2016), 10 (2018).
Various Self-Published one-shot mini-comics	2007-2019	Self-published	Chicken Strips (2007), Hep (2007), The Work of Young, Unfed, and Unknown Cartoonist (2008), More Work from an Unknown Cartoonist (2008), The Limited and Very Rare Noah Van Sciver mini-comic (2009), Chapbook (2009), Judgments (2009), I want to be special to you (2010), Dueling (2011), The Hypo mini promo (2011), More Mundane (2013), In the Thick of It (2019)
Complaints	2010	Poopsheet Foundation	Included in Treasury of Mini Comics Vol. 1. According to the Poopsheet foundation website: "Print run is 50 even though it says 100 on back cover."
Noah novella	2010	Grimalkin Press	"The People's History of Noah Van Sciver. A selection of autobiographical comics" Includes stories Pair of Pants, My First Date, Being Skinny, My Life in Quotations, I am a Rotten Hateful Bastard, The Worst Winter, Process, The Incident, Fame, Complaints, Christmas as a Third Wheel, and Eight Things I Hate.
The Death of Elijah Lovejoy	2011	2dcloud	B&W. Deleted chapter from The Hypo. Reprinted in color in Disquiet.
1999	2012	Retrofit Comics	Self-published bootleg in 2013, and Re-published in Youth is Wasted
Noah Van Sciver in Conversation With Charles Forsman	2012	Oily Comics	
The Hypo: The Melancholic Young Lincoln	2012	Fantagraphics	
Who Is Dead in the White House? mini	2012	Fantagraphics	
St. Cole promo mini	2013	Kilgore Books & Comics	
Weekend Alone	2013	Tinto Press LLC	Sketchbook
Weekend For Two	2014	Tinto Press LLC	Sketchbook
Youth Is Wasted	2014	Adhouse Books	Contains unpublished and previous published work. Excerpts from BLAMMO #s 6, 7, & 8 as well as 1999 minicomic, and stories originally published in Illustrated Journal of Humor Vol. 1, Alternative Comics #4, and MOME #22.
I Don't Hate Your Guts	2014	2D Cloud	
The Lizard Laughed	2014	Oily Comics	Reprinted in Disquiet, self-published and reprinted as stand-alone one shot in 2021
Cheer Up	2014	Hic & Hoc Publications	500 copies printed, rarest fully produced Van Sciver book
Slow Graffiti	2014-2017	Alternative Comics (#1 only) & Self-published	1 (2014), 2 (2016), 3 (2017)
Saint Cole	2015	Fantagraphics	
My Hot Date	2015	Kilgore Books & Comics	Reprinted in 2021 as My Hot Date (and other embarrassments). Includes new intro strip "The Power of the Force" and bonus strip "Holly Hill"
Fante Bukowski	2015	Fantagraphics	
Disquiet	2016	Fantagraphics	Contains unpublished and previous published work. Includes The Lizard Laughed, The Cow's Head, Down in a Hole, Punks V. Lizards, Death of Elijah Lovejoy (in color), previously published Christmas story from unnamed mini-comic, and previously unpublished art & stories.
Fante Bukowski Two	2017	Fantagraphics	
His Last Comic (mini-kuš #60)	2017	kuš!	
One Dirty Tree	2018	Uncivilized Books	
Fante Bukowski 3: A Perfect Failure	2018	Fantagraphics	
Constant Companion	2018	Fantagraphics	Sketchbook, part of "Fantagraphics Underground Series"
For Art's Sake	2020	self-published	Includes a broader story around some strips published in The Introvert's Club weekly strip
The Complete Works of Fante Bukowski	2020	Fantagraphics	Collects Fante Bukowski 1–3 with bonus material
Please Don't Step on my JNCO Jeans	2020	Fantagraphics	Reprints from weekly strip "The Introvert's Club" as published in Columbus Alive.
Boring	2021	Self-published	Autobiographical one-shot floppy
Blammo Issues 1-5	2021	Kilgore Books & Comics	Collection of Blammo Issues 1-5 plus bonus strips: Process, Christmas as a 3rd Wheel, Dueling, Day in the Life of My Father, The Van Sciver Factory, Pair of Pants, My First Date, Embarrassing Story, This Comic Should Be Read in Slow Motion, My Life in Quotations, Winter is a Time to..., Fontano the Chicago Sub, Cowtown Comix Fest, and assorted sketches and notes.
Joseph Smith and the Mormons	2022	Abrams ComicArts	
Maple Terrace 1-3	2023	Uncivilized Comics	Autobiographical three issue floppy
Beat It, Rufus	2025	Fantagraphics	Hardcover Graphic Novel
Vibe Shift	2026	Kuš	New and old work
The Mess	2026	Fantagraphics	Hardcover Graphic Novel

The following is a list of collaborations, anthologies, and collections that feature Van Sciver's work.

COMIC/MAGAZINE	YEAR	PUBLISHER	NOTES
4 Questions	2007-2015	The Denver Westword	Weekly feature in free weekly paper. Mostly interviews with bands but also cartoonists such as Gary Panter and Joseph Remnant. Also included Denver-themed and autobiographical strips.
Mineshaft	2008-2019	Mineshaft Magazine	#23 One page story, #32 Rich Dad, Poor Dad, #33 One page sketch: My last shift at Kilgore Books, #34 One page story: Cabin Fever, #36 1/2 page story: Moonchild, #37 Columbia, #38 One page story: The Self (adaptation of Herman Hesse text)
The Comics Journal	2008–2009, 2020	Fantagraphics	Series of seven three-page cartoon interviews conducted and drawn by Van Sciver. #293 Joe Matt, #295, Liz Prince, #296 Johnny Ryan, #297 Frank Stack, #298 Peter Bagge, #299 John Porcellino, #300 Gary Groth. Also, issue #305 contains a two part tribute to Clare Briggs. 15 full page Clare Briggs comics colored by Van Sciver plus one page comic "A Tribute to Clare Briggs."
Not My Small Diary	2008	Self-published by Delaine Derry Green	Two different issues: #14 Part Two Story: My First Date (Tells the story of the date later revised and expanded to become My Hot Date), #16 Story: I Don't Drive. Reprinted in The Portable Not My Small Diary (2014)
MOME	2009	Fantagraphics	Two different issues: Summer 2009 (#15) Story: The True Tale of the Denver Spider-Man, Fall 2011 (#22), Story: Roommates (later collected in Youth Is Wasted)
Apartment 307	2009	Self-published by Josh Blair	Also contains stories by Josh Blair, Pete Borrebach, and Nick Marino
side b: the music lover's comic anthology	2009	Poseur Ink	Story: My Bohemian Dream
Apartment 307: One Year Later	2010	Self-published by Josh Blair	Also contains stories by Josh Blair, Pete Borrebach, and Nick Marino
Khaki Shorts #26	2010	Braw Books	Scottish anthology. Cover and story: Process. Also collected in The Khollected Khaki Shorts (2015).
Hive 5	2010	Grimalkin Press	Contains excerpt from The Hypo
Sunstone	2010	Sunstone Education Foundation	Three different issues: #360 Special Comics Issue. Story: Fame, #363 Van Sciver's Book of Mormon Origins. Black & White, #364 Van Sciver's Book of Mormon. Full color.
K.B.C. #2	2010	Self-published mini comic anthology	
Wulvereen vs Star Trekk	2010	self-published	Collaboration with John Porcellino made at a superhero convention. Parody of superhero and geek culture.
Bound & Gagged	2010	IWDY Comics	Comic: Hell. Anthology of one-page comics
The Best American Comics 2011	2011	Houghton Mifflin Harcourt	Story: Abby's Road from Blammo #6
So Buttons	2011-2019	Alchemy Comix	Four issues and two compilations. #4 Story: So...Loyal (art only). Also collected in So Buttons: Man of, Like, a Dozen Faces, Story: Noah Van Sciver Tells All (story and art), #5 Story: So...Escalated (art only). Also collected in So Buttons: Man of, Like, a Dozen Faces, #8 Van Sciver did the cover art (Homage to Crumb's cover of American Splendor #4) and the art for story: So...One Halloween. Story also included in So Buttons: Man of, Like, A Dozen Faces, #9 Story: So...Carl (art only), and So Buttons: Slice of Cake (2nd compilation)
š! #10 "Sea Stories"	2012	kuš!	
Little Heart: A comic anthology for marriage equality	2012	2dCloud	Story: Loving
Devastator #6	2012	Devastator Press	Story: Scenes from a New and Used Bookstore
MAD Magazine	2012-2017	DC Comics	#s 516, 518, 520, 542-545
Digestate: A Food & Eating Themed Anthology	2012	Birdcage Bottom Books	Story: 3 Bowls of Raisin Bran, also published in birdy #14
Swayback, Double Four Time	2012	LGL Records	Front and back cover art
Suspect Device	2012-2014	IAMWAR	#s 2-4
Deep In The Woods	2013	2dCloud	"Double header" split comic with Nicholas Breutzman on oversized newsprint. Story: The Cow's Head. Reprinted in Disquiet
Treasury of Mini Comics Volume One	2013	Fantagraphics	includes Complaints mini comic
Henry & Glenn Forever & Ever #4	2013	Microcosm/IWDY Comics	Story: Henry & Glen V. Lizards. Also collected in Henry & Glenn Forever & Ever.
Scene But Not Heard	2013	Top Shelf Productions/Alternative Comics	Collection of wordless comics by Sam Henderson. Van Sciver wrote & drew a 2-page introduction explaining Henderson's impact on his career.
Unknown Origins & Untimely Ends	2013	Hic & Hoc Publications	Story: Meat Shower
Alternative Comics #4	2013	Alternative Comix	Story: Hallelujah!
Real Good Stuff #1 and #2	2013	Poochie Press Publications	Story: Eligibility (Writing by Dennis Eichhorn)
Short Arms, Long Pockets	2014	Oily Comics	An Oily Comics sampler made for free comic book day 2014. Contains 3 page excerpt from The Lizard Laughed.
Pratfall	2014	Self-published zine by Robert Kirby	Anthology featuring "The lighter side of accidents, pain, blood and humiliation."
Cringe: An Anthology of Embarrassment	2014	Birdcage Bottom Books	Illustration: Punk Chasing Wig
The Graphic Canon of Children's Literature: The World's Greatest Kids' Lit as Comics and Visuals	2014	Seven Stories Press	Two stories: Star Dollars and The Water Sprite, both by Brothers Grimm
Subcultures	2014	Ninth Art Press	Story: What is a Juggalo?
Kilgore Quarterly	2014-2017	Kilgore Books	#5, #6, #7 Interior title page sketch
birdy.	2014-2021	Birdy magazine	Contributions to nine different issues: #9 Cover art, #13 Four page interview with various reprinted artwork, #14 Story: 3 Bowls of Rain Bran, also published in Digestate: A Food & Eating Themed Anthology, #21 Cover art, #22 Story: The Floating Head with Bad Breath, #37 Back cover art: Cats, #48 Back cover art: Holiday, #67 Front cover art: Color, #85 1/2 page color art: El Gato (series)
A City of Whiskey & Fire	2015	Red Earth Trace	Story by Daniel Landes, art by Van Sciver. Reprinted in Disquiet.
The Fantastic Four No.9 Project	2015	Self-published by Jason Young	Given away at S.P.A.C.E. 2015. Jason commissioned a different artist to re-draw one page of FF #9. Van Sciver did page 2.
Teenage Mutant Ninja Turtles Amazing Adventures #2	2015	IDW	Backup story, also collected in Teenage Mutant Ninja Turtles Amazing Adventures Vol. 1 TPB
The Hic & Hoc Illustrated Journal of Humor	2015	Alternative Comics	
Schmuck	2015	Alternative Comics	Story: Night at the Museum (art only)
Cinema Sewer Volume Five	2015	Fab Press	Illustrations for story "Rosario 1930: The vintage porno journalism of Curt Moreck"
Taddle Creek #36	2015	Vitalis Publishing	Story: Home
Extra Good Stuff	2015	Last Gasp	Story: Gold Dust Twins (art only)
Hip Hop Family Tree, Volume 4 Treasury Edition	2015	Fantagraphics	Pinup of rap group Gravediggaz
Smoke Signal #23	Fall 2015	Desert Island	Story: Dress Up
Study Group Magazine #4	2016	Study Group	Standard and Deluxe editions. Story: Star Fights (Star Wars parody)
Guido Crepax Valentina Tribute Art	2016	Fantagraphics	One-page pinup, limited to 150 numbered copies
The Introvert's Club	2017-2019	Columbus Alive	Weekly feature in Columbus alt-weekly newspaper and website. Some of the strips were eventually republished as Please Don't Step on my JNCO Jeans and For Art's Sake
NOW: The New Comics Anthology	2017-2020	Fantagraphics	Five issues: #1 Story: Wall of Shame, #3 Story: Wolf Nerd, #7 Story: I'm Punk Now, #8 Story: Saint Cole, #9 Story: Spacehawk
Galago #126	2017	Ordfront	Story: White River Junction, Vermont (Story is in Swedish)
Johnny Appleseed	2017	Fantagraphics	Written by Paul Buhle
Bottoms Up! True Tales of Hitting Rock Bottom	2017	Birdcage Bottom Books	Story: Marigold
Taddle Creek #40	2017	Vitalis Publishing	Story: Cool Comics Club (Of Ohio)
World's Greatest Cartoonists	2017	Fantagraphics	Free Comic Book Day. Cover by Van Sciver. Also includes deleted scene from Fante Bukowski book 2.
Suspect Press	2017-2019	Suspect Press	Four issues: #14 Story: Letter from 1998, #17 Story: Mark Twain Lecture on Artemus Ward (Also printed in Blammo #10), #21 Story:Introvert, #22 cover only
Blind Justice #2	2018	Fantagraphics	Van Sciver did pencils. Three different covers. Also collected in All Time Comics Season 1 TPB
Kramers Ergot 10	2019	Fantagraphics	Story: Lakewoood, Colorado
Eugene V. Debs: A Graphic Biography	2019	Fantagraphics	Written by Paul Buhle & Steve Max
Full Bleed: The Comics & Culture Quarterly, Vol. 3	2019	IDW Publishing	
Stripburger #74	2019	Stripburger	Contains reprint of Artemus Ward (His travels) Among the Mormons from Blammo #10.
Broken Frontier	2020	A Wave Blue World Inc	Story: "Down in a Hole". Reprinted in Disquiet.
Grateful Dead Origins	2020	Z2 Comics	Written by Chris Miskiewicz. Deluxe edition includes LP record.
Peace for Pepe	2020	Dale Zine Shop	One page illustration of Matt Furie's Pepe The Frog
Oh Man! By Clare Briggs	2021	self-published	Collection of prohibition-era comics by Clare Briggs, compiled, published, and with an introduction from Van Sciver.
Freaky #8	2022	Freaky	Reprint of The Floating Head story from birdie. #22
Cheech And Chong's Chronicles: A Brief History of Weed	2022	Z2 Comics	Anthology and collaboration though the majority of pages are drawn by Van Sciver.
Longform 2022	2022	Penguin Books	"An Anthology of Graphic Narratives" Story: Holly Hill (Reprint from 2021 reprint of My Hot Date)
Paul Bunyan:The Invention of an American Legend	2023	TOON Books	

The following is a list of webcomics and illustrations published online.

COMIC	YEAR	WEBSITE	NOTES
Who are you, Jesus	2010	Top Shelf 2.0	Reprint story from Blammo #7
Abraham Lincoln	2010	Top Shelf 2.0	Reprints 7 pages from The Hypo with slightly different coloring
The End of an Artist's Career	2010	Top Shelf 2.0	
Six different classic comic covers redrawn by Van Sciver	2009-2011	Covered Blog	
St. Cole webcomic	2012-2014	Archived version of The Expositor Comics	Collaborative website with Joseph Remnant
Noah Van Sciver's Diary Comics	2012 and 2015	The Comics Journal	Two different five-day diary comics for tcj.com. First in 2012, then in 2015
