= Grateful Dead Origins =

2020 non-fiction graphic novel by Chris Miskiewicz and Noah Van Sciver

- Author: Chris Miskiewicz
- Illustrator: Noah Van Sciver
- Language: English
- Genre: Biography
- Publisher: Z2 Comics
- Publication date: July 2020
- Publication place: United States
- Pages: 152
- ISBN: 978-1940878300

Grateful Dead Origins is a graphic novel about the rock band the Grateful Dead. A work of non-fiction, it tells the story of the early days of the band and how it emerged as part of the San Francisco music scene amid the counterculture of the 1960s. The book was written by Chris Miskiewicz and drawn by Noah Van Sciver. It was edited by David Lemieux, colored by Aladdin Collar, and designed by Tyler Boss.

Grateful Dead Origins was published by Z2 Comics in July 2020. A deluxe edition of the book was published in January 2021.

== Deluxe edition ==
The deluxe edition of Grateful Dead Origins is larger in size than the regular edition and has a hard cover. It includes an LP record of the Grateful Dead performing at the Fillmore West in San Francisco on August 21, 1968. The deluxe version is a limited edition of 6,800 copies. The LP was also offered for sale as a separate item, without the book.

== Critical reception ==
In AIPT, Christopher Franey wrote, "Noah Van Sciver has a style that is caricatured but not way off base. His layouts are great, as they flow nicely and have an interesting vibe to them – they move along in a structure, but when the musical scenes happen, the panels get bigger and livelier. I really appreciate Aladdin Collar working on the colors as it helps to evoke that free spirit, counter-culture feel that these guys embodied.... Chris Miskiewicz does a great job telling a story that makes us feel like we are there.... This is a great graphic novel musical mash-up that does more than any Wikipedia page can do."

In The Comics Journal, Tegan O'Neil wrote, "Coming to the book from the perspective of someone with, if we're being blunt, pretty much zero desire to ever again have to think about the Grateful Dead, it was a very pleasantly readable narrative.... [Noah Van Sciver's] pen is extraordinarily expressive.... Written by Chris Miskiewicz, the book flows pretty well considering how choppy these kind of biopic projects can read in comics form.... The book will find a happy home on many fans' shelves.... It doesn't work completely as a comic book because it's not supposed to be encountered in a vacuum apart from the music."

== Album ==
Grateful Dead Origins

Live album by Grateful Dead
- Released: January 2021
- Recorded: August 21, 1968
- Venue: Fillmore West
- Genre: Rock
- Length: 38:34
- Label: Rhino
- Producer: Grateful Dead

Grateful Dead chronology
The Story of the Grateful Dead (2020)	Grateful Dead Origins (2021)	Dave's Picks Volume 37 (2021)

As noted above, the deluxe edition of the Grateful Dead Origins book includes an LP record of the same name. The album was also sold separately, without the book. It was recorded live in concert at the Fillmore West in San Francisco on August 21, 1968.

=== Track listing ===
Side 1:

1. "Dark Star" (Jerry Garcia, Mickey Hart, Bill Kreutzmann, Phil Lesh, Ron McKernan, Bob Weir, Robert Hunter) – 14:33
2. "St. Stephen" (Garcia, Lesh, Hunter) – 4:45

Side 2:

1. "The Eleven" (Lesh, Hunter) – 11:07
2. "Death Don't Have No Mercy" (Reverend Gary Davis) – 8:09

=== Personnel ===
Grateful Dead

- Jerry Garcia – guitar, vocals
- Mickey Hart – drums
- Bill Kreutzmann – drums
- Phil Lesh – bass, vocals
- Ron McKernan – keyboards
- Bob Weir – guitar, vocals

Production

- Produced by Grateful Dead
- Produced for release by David Lemieux
- Mastering: David Glasser
- Recording: Dan Healey
- Cover art: Noah Van Sciver
- Art direction, design: Steve Vance

== See also ==
- Grateful Dead Comix – an original comic book title published by Kitchen Sink Press, a total of 9 issues 1991–1994.
