= Grateful Dead: Dead Ahead =

Dead Ahead
- Dead Ahead DVD cover
- Directed by: Len Dell'Amico
- Produced by: Richard Loren
- Starring: The Grateful Dead
- Edited by: Veronica Loza
- Distributed by: Stanley Sherman Organization
- Release date: 1981
- Running time: 114 minutes
- Country: United States
- Language: English

Dead Ahead is a concert video by the Grateful Dead. It was recorded at Radio City Music Hall in New York City on October 30 and October 31, 1980, and released in 1981. An expanded version was released in 2005. In contrast to other Dead concert videos, Dead Ahead contains acoustic as well as electric song performances.

== Acoustic and electric tour of 1980 ==
In September and October 1980, the Grateful Dead did a concert tour of shows with three sets each, one acoustic set followed by two electric sets. The acoustic sets were the first the band had performed since the early 1970s aside from a few one-off acoustic sets in special circumstances. The tour comprised 15 shows at The Warfield in San Francisco, two shows at the Saenger Theatre in New Orleans, and eight shows at Radio City Music Hall in New York.

The following year, songs from the tour were released as two live albums, the all-acoustic Reckoning and the all-electric Dead Set.

== The concert video ==
Dead Ahead contains songs from the last two New York concerts, October 30 and October 31, 1980. Although the video was compiled from multiple performances, and is shorter than one of the three-set concerts, it follows the general format of one of the shows, starting with some acoustic material and proceeding to a longer section of amplified music, including a somewhat edited "Drums" and "Space".

The video also includes several sketches by the comedy team of Al Franken and Tom Davis. These are from the final night of the tour, October 31, which was hosted by Franken and Davis, and broadcast on radio and on closed circuit TV.

== Home media ==
Dead Ahead was released on VHS video tape and on laserdisc in 1981. Remastered versions of the video tape and laserdisc were issued in 1995. In November 2005, Dead Ahead was released on a DVD which included 53 minutes of bonus songs.

== Track listing ==
- "Uncle John's Band" (Garcia, Hunter); Studio version
- Introduction (Franken & Davis)
- "Bird Song" (Garcia, Hunter) — acoustic; October 31, 1980
- "On The Road Again" (traditional, arranged by Grateful Dead) — acoustic; October 30, 1980
- "To Lay Me Down" (Garcia, Hunter) — acoustic; October 30, 1980
- "Ripple" (Garcia, Hunter) — acoustic; October 31, 1980
- Henry Kissinger Interview (Franken & Davis)
- "Me and My Uncle" (Phillips); October 31, 1980
- "Mexicali Blues" (Weir, Barlow); October 31, 1980
- "Ramble On Rose" (Garcia, Hunter); October 31, 1980
- "Little Red Rooster" (Dixon); October 31, 1980
- A Visit Backstage (Franken & Davis)
- "Don't Ease Me In" (traditional, arranged by Grateful Dead); October 31, 1980
- "Lost Sailor" (Weir, Barlow); October 31, 1980
- "Saint of Circumstance" (Weir, Barlow); October 31, 1980
- "Franklin's Tower" (Garcia, Kreutzmann, Hunter); October 31, 1980
- "Drums" (Hart, Kreutzmann); October 31, 1980
- "Space" (Garcia, Weir, Lesh, Mydland); October 31, 1980
- "Fire on the Mountain" (Hart, Hunter); October 31, 1980
- "Not Fade Away" (Hardin, Petty); October 31, 1980
- "Good Lovin'" (Resnick, Clark); October 31, 1980

=== DVD bonus tracks ===
- "Heaven Help the Fool" (Weir, Barlow) — acoustic instrumental; October 30, 1980
- "Shakedown Street" (Garcia, Hunter); October 30, 1980
- "Samson and Delilah" (traditional, arranged by Grateful Dead); October 30, 1980
- "He's Gone" (Garcia, Hunter); October 30, 1980
- "Truckin'" (Garcia, Lesh, Weir, Hunter); October 30, 1980

== Credits ==
=== Grateful Dead ===
- Jerry Garcia – vocals, guitar
- Mickey Hart – drums, percussion
- Bill Kreutzmann – drums, percussion
- Phil Lesh – bass
- Brent Mydland – keyboards, vocals
- Bob Weir – vocals, guitar

=== Production ===
- Len Dell'Amico – director
- Richard Loren – producer
- John Scher – executive producer
- Dan Healy and Betty Cantor-Jackson – audio mix
- Candace Brightman – lighting and set design
- Thom Drewke – technical supervisor
- Veronica Loza – editor and production coordinator
- Dennis Larkins and Peter Barsotti – cover art
- Al Franken and Tom Davis – hosts
