= Dave's Picks Volume 36 =

Live album by Grateful Dead
- Released: October 30, 2020
- Recorded: March 26 – 27, 1987
- Venues: Hartford Civic Center; Hartford, Connecticut
- Genre: Rock
- Length: 275:54
- Label: Rhino
- Producer: Grateful Dead

Grateful Dead chronology
American Beauty: The Angel's Share (2020)	Dave's Picks Volume 36 (2020)	The Story of the Grateful Dead (2020)

Dave's Picks Volume 36 is a four-CD live album by the rock band the Grateful Dead. It contains two complete concerts recorded on March 26 and 27, 1987, at the Hartford Civic Center in Hartford, Connecticut. It was released on October 30, 2020, in a limited edition of 22,000 copies.

In July 1986 Grateful Dead guitarist and singer Jerry Garcia lapsed into a diabetic coma lasting several days. Afterwards he began a slow and ultimately successful recovery. Due to Garcia's medical condition, the band had to cancel their late-summer and fall tours. They did not return to playing live shows until December of that year. The two Hartford concerts were performed near the beginning of the band's first tour of the East Coast following these events. According to journalist Andrew Carter, "The energy level during those first post-coma east coast shows—in Hampton, VA (three nights) and Hartford, CT (two nights), respectively—was higher than it had been in years. After a brush with mortality, the Grateful Dead came back as strong as ever."

== Critical reception ==
On AllMusic, Timothy Monger wrote, "A completist's dream, Vol. 36 of the long-running Grateful Dead series Dave's Picks offers up a generous four-disc set containing two complete back-to-back shows from the group's late-'80s revival.... The set lists run the width and breadth of the band's career with numerous highlights and strong, sometimes emotional performances of Dead classics like "Black Peter", "He's Gone", and "Uncle John's Band"."

== Track listing ==
Disc 1

March 26, 1987 – first set:

1. "In the Midnight Hour" (Steve Cropper, Wilson Pickett) – 4:36
2. "Cold Rain and Snow" (traditional, arranged by Grateful Dead) – 6:57
3. "C.C. Rider" (traditional, arranged by Grateful Dead) – 8:29
4. "Row Jimmy" (Jerry Garcia, Robert Hunter) – 11:29
5. "My Brother Esau" (Bob Weir, John Perry Barlow) – 4:49
6. "When Push Comes to Shove" (Garcia, Hunter) – 4:43
7. "Desolation Row" > (Bob Dylan) – 8:55
8. "Bird Song" (Garcia, Hunter) – 10:34
9. "Promised Land" (Chuck Berry) – 4:30

Disc 2

March 26, 1987 – second set:

1. "China Cat Sunflower" > (Garcia, Hunter) – 6:04
2. "I Know You Rider" (traditional, arranged by Grateful Dead) – 5:28
3. "Looks Like Rain" (Weir, Barlow) – 8:26
4. "He's Gone" > (Garcia, Hunter) – 13:25
5. "Drums" > (Mickey Hart, Bill Kreutzmann) – 8:42
6. "Space" > (Garcia, Phil Lesh, Weir) – 7:41
7. "I Need a Miracle" > (Weir, Barlow) – 4:15
8. "Black Peter" > (Garcia, Hunter) – 9:26
9. "Around and Around" (Berry) – 3:48
10. "Good Lovin'" (Rudy Clark, Arthur Resnick) – 8:07

March 26, 1987 – encore:

11. "The Mighty Quinn" (Dylan) – 4:28

Disc 3

March 27, 1987 – first set:

1. "Alabama Getaway" > (Garcia, Hunter) – 5:09
2. "Greatest Story Ever Told" (Weir, Hart, Hunter) – 4:32
3. "West L.A. Fadeaway" (Garcia, Hunter) – 7:34
4. "Little Red Rooster" (Willie Dixon) – 8:21
5. "Brown-Eyed Women" (Garcia, Hunter) – 5:44
6. "Beat It On Down the Line" (Jesse Fuller) – 3:25
7. "Tennessee Jed" (Garcia, Hunter) – 9:04
8. "The Music Never Stopped" (Weir, Barlow) – 8:27

March 27, 1987 – second set:

9. "Touch of Grey" > (Garcia, Hunter) – 6:24
10. "Samson and Delilah" (traditional, arranged by Weir) – 8:07
11. "Cumberland Blues" (Garcia, Hunter, Lesh) – 5:19

Disc 4

March 27, 1987 – second set, continued:

1. "Estimated Prophet" > (Weir, Barlow) – 10:39
2. "Eyes of the World" > (Garcia, Hunter) – 8:28
3. "Drums" > (Hart, Kreutzmann) – 9:08
4. "Space" > (Garcia, Lesh, Weir) – 7:07
5. "Uncle John's Band" > (Garcia, Hunter) – 7:19
6. "Morning Dew" (Bonnie Dobson, Tim Rose) – 11:24

March 27, 1987 – encore:

7. "Johnny B. Goode" (Berry) – 4:47

== Personnel ==
Grateful Dead

- Jerry Garcia – guitar, vocals
- Mickey Hart – drums
- Bill Kreutzmann – drums
- Phil Lesh – bass, vocals
- Brent Mydland – keyboards, vocals
- Bob Weir – guitar, vocals

Production

- Produced by Grateful Dead
- Produced for release by David Lemieux
- Mastering: Jeffrey Norman
- Recording: Dan Healy, Don Pearson
- Art direction, design: Steve Vance
- Cover art: Dave Kloc
- Photos: James R. Anderson, Robbi Cohn, David Lemieux
- Liner notes essay: David Lemieux

== Charts ==
Chart (2020)	Peak position
US Billboard 200	25
US Top Rock Albums (Billboard)	5
