= Dave's Picks Volume 38 =

Live album by Grateful Dead
- Released: April 30, 2021
- Recorded: September 8, 1973
- Venue: Nassau Coliseum; Uniondale, New York
- Genre: Rock
- Length: 229:22 (Bonus disc 79:58)
- Label: Rhino
- Producer: Grateful Dead

Grateful Dead chronology
Dave's Picks Volume 37 (2021)	Dave's Picks Volume 38 (2021)	Dave's Picks Volume 39 (2021)

Alternative cover
- Dave's Picks 2021 Bonus Disc

Dave's Picks Volume 38 is a three-CD live album by the rock band the Grateful Dead. It contains the complete concert recorded on September 8, 1973 at Nassau Coliseum in Uniondale, New York. It also contains two bonus tracks recorded on the previous night at the same venue. Some copies of the album include a bonus disc with eight more songs from the September 7 concert. It was released on April 30, 2021 in a limited edition of 25,000 copies.

Dave's Picks Volume 38 was the first live Dead album to include the song "Let Me Sing Your Blues Away", sung by keyboardist Keith Godchaux. The "Eyes of the World" on the bonus disc was previously released, in slightly edited form, as a bonus track on the 2004 reissue of Wake of the Flood.

The September 7 and 8, 1973 Nassau Coliseum concerts were the first Grateful Dead shows at which Jerry Garcia played his custom Doug Irwin guitar "Wolf".

== Critical reception ==
On AllMusic Timothy Monger wrote, "Captured at Uniondale, New York's Nassau Coliseum, this set features a number of songs from the band's soon-to-be-released Wake of the Flood LP including a dreamy "Stella Blue", a 15-minute "Eyes of the World", and the live debut of "Weather Report Suite"."

== Track listing ==
Disc 1

First set:

1. "Bertha" (Jerry Garcia, Robert Hunter) – 6:21
2. "Me and My Uncle" (John Phillips) – 3:16
3. "Sugaree" (Garcia, Hunter) – 8:03
4. "Beat It On Down the Line" (Jesse Fuller) – 3:39
5. "Tennessee Jed" (Garcia, Hunter) – 8:09
6. "Looks Like Rain" (Bob Weir, John Perry Barlow) – 8:15
7. "Brown-Eyed Women" (Garcia, Hunter) – 5:49
8. "Jack Straw" (Weir, Hunter) – 5:27
9. "Row Jimmy" (Garcia, Hunter) – 9:51)
10. "Weather Report Suite" – 15:00
  - "Prelude" (Weir)
  - "Part I" (Weir, Eric Andersen)
  - "Part II (Let It Grow)" (Weir, Barlow)

Disc 2

First set, continued:

1. "Eyes of the World" (Garcia, Hunter) – 15:23
2. "China Doll" (Garcia, Hunter) – 6:28

Second set:

3. "Greatest Story Ever Told" (Weir, Mickey Hart, Hunter) – 5:13
4. "Ramble On Rose" (Garcia, Hunter) – 6:57
5. "Big River" (Johnny Cash) – 5:02
6. "Let Me Sing Your Blues Away" (Keith Godchaux, Hunter) – 4:10
7. "China Cat Sunflower" (Garcia, Hunter) – 8:23
8. "I Know You Rider" (traditional, arranged by Grateful Dead) – 6:19
9. "El Paso" (Marty Robbins) – 4:51

September 7, 1973:

10. "Bird Song" (Garcia, Hunter) – 13:27

Disc 3

Second set, continued:

1. "He's Gone" (Garcia, Hunter) – 14:55
2. "Truckin'" (Garcia, Phil Lesh, Weir, Hunter) – 11:46
3. "Not Fade Away" (Norman Petty, Charles Hardin) – 9:03
4. "Goin' Down the Road Feeling Bad" (traditional, arranged by Grateful Dead) – 7:55
5. "Not Fade Away" (Petty, Hardin) – 4:17

Encore:

6. "Stella Blue" (Garcia, Hunter) – 7:56
7. "One More Saturday Night" (Weir) – 5:06

September 7, 1973:

8. "Playing in the Band" (Weir, Hart, Hunter) – 18:16

Dave's Picks 2021 Bonus Disc

September 7, 1973:

1. "Here Comes Sunshine" (Garcia, Hunter) – 11:04
2. "Let It Grow" > (Weir, Barlow) – 11:33
3. "Stella Blue" (Garcia, Hunter) – 8:32
4. "Truckin'" > (Garcia, Lesh, Weir, Hunter) – 10:44
5. "Drums" > (Bill Kreutzmann) – 2:30
6. "The Other One Jam" > (Weir, Kreutzmann) – 7:09
7. "Eyes of the World" > (Garcia, Hunter) – 19:02
8. "Sugar Magnolia" (Weir, Hunter) – 9:22

Note: The song list for the September 7, 1973 concert at Nassau Coliseum was:

First set: "Promised Land" · "Sugaree" · "Mexicali Blues" · "They Love Each Other" · "Jack Straw" · "Looks Like Rain" · "Deal" · "El Paso" · "Bird Song"^{[A]} · "Playing in the Band"^{[A]}

Second set: "Here Comes Sunshine"^{[B]} · "Me and My Uncle" · "Loser" · "Let It Grow"^{[B]} · "Stella Blue"^{[B]} · "Truckin'"^{[B]} · "Drums"^{[B]} · "The Other One Jam"^{[B]} · "Eyes of the World"^{[B]} · "Sugar Magnolia"^{[B]}

Encore: "Around and Around"

[A] Included in Dave's Picks Volume 38
[B] Included in Dave's Picks 2021 bonus disc

== Personnel ==
Grateful Dead

- Jerry Garcia – guitar, vocals
- Bob Weir – guitar, vocals
- Keith Godchaux – keyboards, vocals
- Donna Jean Godchaux – vocals
- Phil Lesh – bass, vocals
- Bill Kreutzmann – drums

Production

- Produced by Grateful Dead
- Produced for release by David Lemieux
- Mastering: Jeffrey Norman
- Recording: Kidd Candelario
- Art direction, design: Steve Vance
- Cover art: Helen Rebecchi Kennedy
- Photos: Richard Burke
- Liner notes: David Lemieux, Jay Kerley

== Charts ==
Chart performance for Dave's Picks Volume 38
Chart (2021)	Peak position
US Billboard 200	25
US Top Rock Albums (Billboard)	3
