= Dennis Leonard (disambiguation) =

Dennis Leonard (born 1951) is an American baseball player.

Den(n)is Leonard may also refer to:

- Dennis Leonard (sound editor), sound editor
- Denis Leonard of Westmeath County Council
- Dennis Leonard, engineer on Dead Set (album)
- Dennis Leonard, of KWGN-TV
