= Dave's Picks Volume 24 =

Live album by Grateful Dead
- Released: November 1, 2017
- Recorded: August 25, 1972
- Venue: Berkeley Community Theatre; Berkeley, California
- Genre: Rock
- Length: 165:01
- Label: Rhino
- Producer: Grateful Dead

Grateful Dead chronology
Dave's Picks Volume 23 (2017)	Dave's Picks Volume 24 (2017)	Robert F. Kennedy Stadium, Washington, D.C., July 12 & 13, 1989 (2017)

Dave's Picks Volume 24 is a three-CD live album by the rock band the Grateful Dead. It contains the complete concert recorded at the Berkeley Community Theatre in Berkeley, California on August 25, 1972. It was produced as a limited edition of 16,500 copies, and was released on November 1, 2017.

On copies of the show that had previously circulated online, the last three songs were missing.

The next concert performed by the band, two days later, is documented in the film and album Sunshine Daydream.

== Critical reception ==
On AllMusic, Timothy Monger said, "Captured in late August, just a few months after the Dead's epic Europe '72 tour, this show took place at the Berkeley Community Theatre on the campus of Berkeley High School. In spite of, or perhaps inspired by the comforts of being on home turf, they turn in a relaxed yet fresh and exploratory set, offering a set list that reflects the riches of that era."

According to Glide Magazine the album has, "... a setlist comprised of durable concert favorites, at a time in Grateful Dead history that this band arguably had its deepest store of excellent material, sequenced in an order that alternately (and sometimes simultaneously) reassures and surprises: hear some forty-four minutes of "Truckin'" into "The Other One" for example.... As complete a package as any in the five-year history of the series, Dave's Picks Volume 24... is a set that validates a Deadhead's devotion and presents the full spectrum of attraction(s) for the uninitiated."

== Track listing ==
Disc 1

First set:

1. "Cold Rain and Snow" (traditional, arranged by Grateful Dead) – 7:46
2. "Black-Throated Wind" (Bob Weir, John Barlow) – 6:19
3. "He's Gone" (Jerry Garcia, Robert Hunter) – 10:16
4. "Beat It On Down the Line" (Jesse Fuller) – 3:26 (Note: "Stars and Stripes Forever" tuning before "Beat It On Down the Line")
5. "Loser" (Garcia, Hunter) – 8:29
6. "El Paso" (Marty Robbins) – 4:56 (Note: "Frozen Logger" tuning before "El Paso")
7. "Black Peter" (Garcia, Hunter) – 9:12
8. "Jack Straw" (Weir, Hunter) – 5:01

Disc 2

1. "Friend of the Devil" (Garcia, John Dawson, Hunter) – 4:10
2. "Promised Land" (Chuck Berry) – 3:37
3. "Bird Song" (Garcia, Hunter) – 11:25
4. "Playing in the Band" (Weir, Mickey Hart, Hunter) – 16:48
5. "Bertha" (Garcia, Hunter) – 6:40

Disc 3

Second set:

1. "Truckin'" > (Garcia, Phil Lesh, Weir, Hunter) – 16:02
2. "The Other One" > (Weir, Bill Kreutzmann) – 28:03
3. "Stella Blue" (Garcia, Hunter) – 9:03
4. "One More Saturday Night" (Weir) – 5:46

Encore:

5. "Sugar Magnolia" (Weir, Hunter) – 7:57

== Personnel ==
Grateful Dead

- Jerry Garcia – guitar, vocals
- Donna Jean Godchaux – vocals
- Keith Godchaux – keyboards
- Bill Kreutzmann – drums
- Phil Lesh – bass, vocals
- Bob Weir – guitar, vocals

Production

- Produced by Grateful Dead
- Produced for release by David Lemieux
- Mastering: Jeffrey Norman
- Recording: Owsley Stanley
- Art direction, design: Steve Vance
- Cover art: Dave Van Patten
- Photos: Michael Parrish
- Liner notes essay "This Is the Season of What?" by David Lemieux
- Executive producer: Mark Pinkus
- Associate producers: Doran Tyson, Ivette Ramos
- Tape research: Michael Wesley Johnson
- Archival research: UC Santa Cruz Grateful Dead Archive
- Tapes provided through the assistance of ABCD Enterprises LLC

== Charts ==
Chart (2017)	Peak position
US Billboard 200	91
