= Candyman (Grateful Dead song) =

Song by Grateful Dead

from the album American Beauty
- Released: November 1, 1970
- Studio: Wally Heider Studios, San Francisco
- Genre: Blues; country; folk
- Length: 6:14
- Label: Warner Bros.
- Songwriters: Jerry Garcia; Robert Hunter
- Producers: Grateful Dead; Steve Barncard

"Candyman" is a song by the American folk rock band Grateful Dead from their 1970 album American Beauty, written by Jerry Garcia and Robert Hunter.

== Background ==
Multiple different songs with the title "Candyman" existed before the Grateful Dead's song, most of them having very sexual themes in their lyrics.

== Composition and lyrics ==
The lyrics of "Candyman" describe rural gambling and the dark side of country social circles.

== Recording ==
According to Ned Lagin, who played the piano on the track, he played "exactly what was required" for his piano part, while claiming he "never thought he should do any more than that".

== Reception ==
David Gans recounted an interview in his book Conversations with the Dead: The Grateful Dead Interview Book where Garcia called "Candyman" "pretty blatant". Matthew Greenwald called it a "mournful, slow blues with country shading", while noting that the harmonies were inspired by Crosby Stills & Nash.

== Personnel ==
Grateful Dead

- Jerry Garcia – lead vocals, electric guitar
- Bill Kreutzmann – drums
- Bob Weir – rhythm guitar
- Phil Lesh – bass
- Mickey Hart – percussion

Other musicians

- Ned Lagin – piano
- Howard Wales – organ

== Cover versions ==
American guitarist Jim James contributed a cover of the song to Day of the Dead, a Grateful Dead tribute album, a cover that was described as "aching" by Rolling Stone magazine. Andy Cohen played the song for his daughter, stating "I love singing to my girl. Every week she gets a little more 'awake'."

== Sources ==
- Gans, David (2002). Conversations with the Dead: The Grateful Dead Interview Book. Da Capo Press. ISBN 0-306-81099-9.
- Jackson, Blair (1999). Garcia: An American Life. Penguin Books. ISBN 0-670-88660-2.
