= Dark Hollow (song) =

Single by Bill Browning
- A-side: "Borned with the Blues"
- Released: 1958
- Recorded: 1958
- Genre: Folk
- Length: 2:10
- Label: Island
- Songwriter(s): Bill Browning

"Dark Hollow" is a folk song first recorded by folk singer-songwriter Bill Browning in 1958. It is included as the B-side of his single "Borned with the Blues". Though usually credited to Browning, the song has some lyrical similarities to the traditional "East Virginia Blues/East Virginia" and "Come All You Fair and Tender Ladies", likely Browning's inspiration.

The British folk group Pentangle sang a version of that song called “Cold Mountain” which includes several lyrics to “Dark Hollow” that are identical. Pentangle toured in the US in early 1969 and opened up for the Grateful Dead on several occasions while at the Fillmore West in San Francisco.

"Dark Hollow" is considered to be the most popular of Browning's short career, but it did not reach the peak of its popularity until it was recorded by Grateful Dead in the early 1970s. They began performing acoustic covers of the song in 1970. Electric covers soon followed in 1973 followed by more acoustic covers in 1980. In total, Grateful Dead performed "Dark Hollow" around 30 times. Their version appears on History of the Grateful Dead, Volume One (Bear's Choice) and the live recording Reckoning.

== Other renditions ==
- Jimmie Skinner – (1958)
- David Grisman – Early Dawg (1966)
- Mac Wiseman – Mac Wiseman (1967)
- Ralph Stanley – Hills of Home (1969)
- Grateful Dead - History of the Grateful Dead, Volume One (Bear's Choice) (1973)
- Muleskinner – Muleskinner (1974)
- David Bromberg – Midnight on the Water (1975)
- Amythyst Kiah – Dig (2020)
