= Reckoning (Grateful Dead album) =

1981 live album by the Grateful Dead

Live album by Grateful Dead
- Released: April 1, 1981
- Recorded: September 25 – October 31, 1980
- Venue: Warfield Theatre, San Francisco, CA; Radio City Music Hall, New York, NY
- Genre: Folk rock; acoustic rock
- Length: 72:21
- Label: Arista
- Producer: Dan Healy; Betty Cantor-Jackson; Jerry Garcia

Grateful Dead chronology
Go to Heaven (1980)	Reckoning (1981)	Dead Set (1981)

Professional ratings
Review scores
Source	Rating
AllMusic	4/5 stars
Robert Christgau	B+

Reckoning is a 1981 live double album by the Grateful Dead. It is the band's sixth live album and seventeenth album overall. It consists of acoustic material recorded live in September and October 1980. Some of the tracks are shortened versions of the live performances.

The material recorded in 1980 was originally intended for release on one double LP set, but the format of the music subsequently steered the Grateful Dead towards the release of two double albums, Reckoning and Dead Set. Grateful Dead guitarist Jerry Garcia commented that the band "ended with so much good material that it was a struggle. The idea of just one acoustic and one electric record was sort of pathetic, since our electric tunes are seldom less than eight minutes long. And that meant our fat electric album would have two songs on a side. It was kind of silly."

Initial CD releases omitted one track, "Oh Babe, It Ain't No Lie", for space reasons. One CD, tape, and LP release, by Pair/Arista Records in 1984, was given the title For the Faithful.... In 1988 the album was re-issued with the original title.

== Track listing ==
=== Original release ===
Side A
No.	Title	Writer(s)	Recording date and venue	Length
1.	"Dire Wolf"	Jerry Garcia; Robert Hunter	10/11/80 Warfield Theatre	3:20
2.	"The Race Is On"	Don Rollins	10/13/80 Warfield Theatre	2:58
3.	"Oh Babe It Ain't No Lie"	Elizabeth Cotten	09/30/80 Warfield Theatre	6:28
4.	"It Must Have Been the Roses"	Hunter	10/26/80 Radio City Music Hall	6:56

Side B
No.	Title	Writer(s)	Recording date and venue	Length
5.	"Dark Hollow"	Bill Browning	10/07/80 Warfield Theatre	3:49
6.	"China Doll"	Garcia; Hunter	10/14/80 Warfield Theatre	5:22
7.	"Been All Around This World"	Trad. arr. Grateful Dead	10/14/80 Warfield Theatre	4:31
8.	"Monkey and the Engineer"	Jesse Fuller	10/27/80 Radio City Music Hall	2:37
9.	"Jack-A-Roe"	Trad. arr. Grateful Dead	10/10/80 Warfield Theatre	4:05

Side C
No.	Title	Writer(s)	Recording date and venue	Length
10.	"Deep Elem Blues"	Trad. arr. Grateful Dead	10/11/80 Warfield Theatre	4:51
11.	"Cassidy"	Bob Weir; John Perry Barlow	10/14/80 Warfield Theatre	4:38
12.	"To Lay Me Down"	Garcia; Hunter	10/25/80 Radio City Music Hall	8:59

Side D
No.	Title	Writer(s)	Recording date and venue	Length
13.	"Rosa Lee McFall"	Charlie Monroe	09/26/80 Warfield Theatre	2:54
14.	"On the Road Again"	Trad. arr. Grateful Dead	10/30/80 Radio City Music Hall	3:15
15.	"Bird Song"	Garcia; Hunter	10/14/80 Warfield Theatre	7:34
16.	"Ripple"	Garcia; Hunter	09/26/80 Warfield Theatre	4:38
Total length:				77:05

=== 2004 Rhino reissue bonus disc ===
No.	Title	Writer(s)	Recording date and venue	Length
1.	"To Lay Me Down" (Studio Rehearsal)	Garcia; Hunter	09/14/80 Club Front	9:12
2.	"Iko Iko"	James "Sugar Boy" Crawford, Barbara Anne Hawkins, Rosa Lee Hawkins, Joan Johnson	10/07/80 Warfield Theatre	4:23
3.	"Heaven Help the Fool" (instrumental version)	Weir; Barlow	10/25/80 Radio City Music Hall	6:18
4.	"El Paso"	Marty Robbins	10/13/80 Warfield Theatre	4:41
5.	"Sage & Spirit"	Weir	10/31/80 Radio City Music Hall	3:14
6.	"Little Sadie"	Trad. arr. Grateful Dead	10/31/80 Radio City Music Hall	2:45
7.	"It Must Have Been the Roses" (Alternate Live Version)	Hunter	10/23/80 Radio City Music Hall	7:01
8.	"Dark Hollow" (Alternate Live Version)	Trad. arr. Grateful Dead	10/23/80 Radio City Music Hall	4:30
9.	"Jack-A-Roe" (Alternate Live Version)	Trad. arr. Grateful Dead	10/23/80 Radio City Music Hall	5:08
10.	"Cassidy" (Alternate Live Version)	Weir; Barlow	10/23/80 Radio City Music Hall	5:06
11.	"China Doll" (Alternate Live Version)	Garcia; Hunter	10/23/80 Radio City Music Hall	5:52
12.	"Monkey and the Engineer" (Alternate Live Version)	Fuller	10/23/80 Radio City Music Hall	2:37
13.	"Oh Babe It Ain't No Lie" (Alternate Live Version)	Cotten	10/23/80 Radio City Music Hall	7:13
14.	"Ripple" (Alternate Live Version)	Garcia; Hunter	10/23/80 Radio City Music Hall	4:37
15.	"Tom Dooley"	Trad. arr. Grateful Dead	11/17/78 Rambler Room	3:33
16.	"Deep Elem Blues" (Alternate Live Version)	Trad. arr. Grateful Dead	11/17/78 Rambler Room	3:42
Total length:				79:55

== Personnel ==
- Jerry Garcia – guitar, vocals
- Bob Weir – guitar, vocals
- Phil Lesh – bass guitar
- Brent Mydland – piano, harpsichord, vocals (except 1978 tracks)
- Bill Kreutzmann – drums
- Mickey Hart – drums

Production

- Produced by Dan Healy, Betty Cantor-Jackson, Jerry Garcia
- Mixing: Dan Healy
- Recording: Betty Cantor-Jackson
- Engineering: Don Pearson, John Cutler, Dennis Leonard
- Cover illustration: Rick Griffin
- Photography: John Werner

== Charts ==
Album: Billboard

Year	Chart	Position
1981	Pop Albums	43

Singles: Billboard

Year	Single	Chart	Position
1981	"Dire Wolf"	Mainstream Rock	37
