= Workingman's Dead =

1970 album by Grateful Dead

Studio album by Grateful Dead
- Released: June 14, 1970
- Recorded: February 1970
- Studios: Pacific High Recording, San Francisco
- Genres: Roots rock; folk rock; country rock; blues rock
- Length: 35:33
- Label: Warner Bros.
- Producers: Bob Matthews; Betty Cantor; Grateful Dead

Grateful Dead chronology
Live/Dead (1969)	Workingman's Dead (1970)	Vintage Dead (1970)

Singles from Workingman's Dead
- 1. "Uncle John's Band" Released: July 1, 1970

Professional ratings
Review scores
Source	Rating
AllMusic	5/5 stars
American Songwriter	5/5 stars
Christgau's Record Guide	A
The Encyclopedia of Popular Music	5/5 stars
Pitchfork	9.1/10
Rolling Stone	5/5 stars

Workingman's Dead is the fourth studio album (and fifth overall) by American rock band the Grateful Dead. It was recorded in February 1970 and released on June 14, 1970, by Warner Bros. Records. The album and its studio follow-up, American Beauty, were recorded back-to-back using a similar style, eschewing the psychedelic experimentation of previous albums in favor of Jerry Garcia and Robert Hunter's Americana-styled songcraft.

In 2003, the album was ranked number 262 on Rolling Stone magazine's list of the 500 greatest albums of all time, 264 in a 2012 revised list, and 409 in the 2020 list. It was voted number 371 in Colin Larkin's All Time Top 1000 Albums.

== Recording ==
The band again recorded at Pacific High Recording Studio in San Francisco, spending just nine days there. After the protracted sessions required for the previous two studio albums, Garcia suggested "Let's do it all in three weeks and get it the hell out of the way". Besides trying to avoid the debt that had accumulated while recording Aoxomoxoa, the band was dealing with the stress of a recent drug bust in New Orleans – which could have resulted in jail time. Additionally, they returned from a tour to find their soon-to-be-fired manager, Lenny Hart (father of drummer Mickey Hart), refusing to show the books to anyone else in the organization. "In midst of all this adverse stuff that was happening ... [recording the album] was definitely an upper," said Garcia in an interview.

Lyricist Robert Hunter had joined the band on the road for the first time, resulting in a period of faster song development. Unlike the psychedelic, electrified music for which the band had become known, the new songs took a new direction, reviving their folk-band roots. Bassist Phil Lesh stated "The song lyrics reflected an 'old, weird' America that perhaps never was ... The almost miraculous appearance of these new songs would also generate a massive paradigm shift in our group mind: from the mind-munching frenzy of a seven-headed fire-breathing dragon to the warmth and serenity of a choir of chanting cherubim. Even the album cover reflects this new direction: The cover for Aoxomoxoa is colorful and psychedelic, and that of Workingman’s Dead is monochromatic and sepia." In recent years, a search revealed that the photograph was taken at 1199 Evans Avenue in San Francisco.

Workingman's Dead and American Beauty, the companion album that followed months later, were, according to drummer Bill Kreutzmann, both influenced by the Bakersfield sound. He explained "We tried to be like a Bakersfield band – but one that still sounded like we were from 300 miles north of that town ... we held to our psychedelic roots. Workingman's Dead was all about discovering the song ... American Beauty became all about having the harmonies to do that".

This was, sort of, stepping out of our spacesuit and coming down to Earth and putting on a pair of Osh Kosh and digging the furrows ... we would have to bring the music in, to support the texts: Hunter's Holy Grail

— Mickey Hart

While on tour in Boulder, Colorado, the previous year, Garcia had purchased a steel guitar and was now keen to use it on the new batch of songs. Lesh explained, "Just as with any other instrument he picked up, he made it sing. The main impetus for this development was the nature of the new songs Hunter and Jerry had been writing; many of them had a decidedly country flavor ('Dire Wolf,' 'Friend of the Devil,' 'High Time,' 'Casey Jones', 'Ripple'), and Jerry began using the new axe on these as they were slotted into the set lists. Bobby [Weir] also began bringing in covers of his favorite country tunes and some originals in that vein, so we were starting to see a trend developing. Personally, I was thrilled that the band could make such a complete musical about-face while still maintaining the flat-out weirdness that I’d come to know and love."

Songs such as "Uncle John's Band", "High Time", and "Cumberland Blues" were brought to life with soaring harmonies and layered vocal textures that had not previously been a part of the band's sound. According to the 1992 Dead oral history, Aces Back to Back, in the summer of 1968 Stephen Stills vacationed at Mickey Hart's ranch in Novato. "Stills lived with me for three months around the time of CSN's first record," recalls Hart, "and he and David Crosby really turned Jerry and Bobby onto the voice as the holy instrument. You know, 'Hey, is this what a voice can do?' That turned us away from pure improvisation and more toward songs."

Garcia commented that much of the sound of the album comes both from his pairing with Hunter, as well as the band's friendship with Crosby, Stills and Nash: "Hearing those guys sing and how nice they sounded together, we thought, 'We can try that. Let's work on it a little'."

== Release ==
The album title came about when Jerry Garcia commented to lyricist Robert Hunter that the album was "turning into the 'workingman's Dead' version of the band". Having both worked on all of the album's songs and gone out on the road with the band, Hunter appears as a seventh member on the front cover photograph.

Warner Bros. released "Uncle John's Band" (backed with "New Speedway Boogie") as a single to promote the album. It received limited airplay, even though it was edited to a radio-friendly three-minute length and the lyric "goddamn" removed.

Readers of Rolling Stone voted Workingman's Dead the best album of 1970, followed by Crosby, Stills, Nash and Young's Déjà Vu and Van Morrison's Moondance.

The album was remastered and expanded in 2001 as part of Rhino Records' 12-CD box set The Golden Road (1965–1973). This version, given separate release in 2003, includes eight bonus tracks. A DVD-Audio version was also released in 2001, without the bonus material. In 2014 it was issued as a two-LP set, mastered at 45 rpm by Mobile Fidelity Sound Lab.

In 2020 Rhino Records released the "50th Anniversary Deluxe Edition" of Workingman's Dead. Disc one contains a new remaster of the album. Discs two and three contain a previously unreleased complete concert from the Capitol Theater in Port Chester, New York, recorded on February 21, 1971.

In April 2026 Rhino released three audiophile versions of Workingman's Dead. The first is a vinyl LP produced using the original master tapes. The second is a reel-to-reel tape, also produced from the original masters. The third is a Dolby Atmos mix of the album, created in 2023 by Grateful Dead drummer Mickey Hart and released on Blu-ray disc.

== Track listing ==
All songs written by Jerry Garcia and Robert Hunter, except where noted.

Side one
No.	Title	Lead vocals	Length
1.	"Uncle John's Band"	Garcia; Bob Weir; Phil Lesh	4:42
2.	"High Time"	Garcia	5:13
3.	"Dire Wolf"	Garcia	3:13
4.	"New Speedway Boogie"	Garcia	4:05
Total length:			17:13

Side two
No.	Title	Writer(s)	Lead vocals	Length
1.	"Cumberland Blues"	Garcia; Lesh; Hunter	Garcia; Weir; Lesh	3:15
2.	"Black Peter"		Garcia	5:42
3.	"Easy Wind"	Hunter	Ron McKernan	4:59
4.	"Casey Jones"		Garcia	4:24
Total length:				18:20

2001/2003 reissue bonus tracks
No.	Title	Length
9.	"New Speedway Boogie" (alternate mix)	4:10
10.	"Dire Wolf" (live)	2:31
11.	"Black Peter" (live)	9:07
12.	"Easy Wind" (live)	8:09
13.	"Cumberland Blues" (live)	4:52
14.	"Mason's Children" (live: Garcia, Lesh, Bob Weir, Hunter)	6:32
15.	"Uncle John's Band" (live)	7:57
16.	"Radio promo"	1:00
Total length:		44:18 79:51

Bonus track details

- "Dire Wolf" recorded June 27, 1969, at Santa Rosa Veterans Memorial Hall, Santa Rosa, CA
- "Black Peter" recorded January 10, 1970, at Golden Hall Community Concourse, San Diego, CA
- "Easy Wind" recorded January 16, 1970, at Springer's Ballroom, Gresham, OR
- "Cumberland Blues" recorded January 17, 1970, at Oregon State University (Gymnasium), Corvallis, OR
- "Mason's Children" recorded January 24, 1970 at Civic Auditorium, Honolulu, HI (later released with complete concert on Dave's Picks Volume 19)
- "Uncle John's Band" recorded October 4, 1970, at Winterland, San Francisco, CA (sleeve notes incorrectly list as December 23, 1970, Winterland; another track from this date is a bonus on American Beauty)

=== 50th Anniversary Deluxe Edition ===
Disc two - February 21, 1971 (Set 1) – Capitol Theatre – Port Chester, New York
No.	Title	Length
1.	"Cold Rain and Snow" (traditional, arranged by Grateful Dead)	7:36
2.	"Me and Bobby McGee" (Kris Kristofferson, Fred Foster)	7:33
3.	"Loser" (Garcia, Hunter)	6:54
4.	"Easy Wind"	8:49
5.	"Playing in the Band" (Weir, Hart, Hunter)	5:25
6.	"Bertha" (Garcia, Hunter)	6:13
7.	"Me and My Uncle" (John Phillips)	3:56
8.	"Ripple" (false start)	1:09
9.	"Ripple" (Garcia, Hunter)	5:24
10.	"Next Time You See Me" (Earl Forest, Bill Harvey)	4:39
11.	"Sugar Magnolia" (Bob Weir, Robert Hunter)	6:08
12.	"Greatest Story Ever Told" (Weir, Hunter)	4:09
13.	"Johnny B. Goode" (Chuck Berry)	3:42
Total length:		71:37 107:10

Disc three - February 21, 1971 (Set 2) – Capitol Theatre – Port Chester, New York
No.	Title	Length
1.	"China Cat Sunflower" (Garcia, Hunter)	6:20
2.	"I Know You Rider" (traditional, arranged by Grateful Dead)	4:29
3.	"Bird Song" (Garcia, Hunter)	6:17
4.	"Cumberland Blues"	4:55
5.	"I'm a King Bee" (Slim Harpo)	7:32
6.	"Beat It On Down the Line" (Jesse Fuller)	3:17
7.	"Wharf Rat" (Garcia, Hunter)	9:46
8.	"Truckin'" (Garcia, Lesh, Weir, Hunter)	8:07
9.	"Casey Jones"	4:39
10.	"Good Lovin'" (Artie Resnick, Rudy Clark)	17:00
11.	"Uncle John's Band"	7:27
Total length:		79:49 186:59

== Workingman's Dead: The Angel's Share ==
Workingman's Dead: The Angel's Share

Studio album by Grateful Dead
- Released: July 1, 2020
- Recorded: February 1970
- Studio: Pacific High Recording
- Label: Rhino

Grateful Dead chronology
Dave's Picks Volume 34 (2020)	Workingman's Dead: The Angel's Share (2020)	Dave's Picks Volume 35 (2020)

On July 1, 2020, a collection of demos and outtakes from the Workingman's Dead recording sessions entitled Workingman's Dead: The Angel's Share was released in streaming and digital download formats.

=== Track listing ===
Workingman’s Dead: The Angel’s Share
No.	Title	Length
1.	"Uncle John’s Band (False Start 1) [Not Slated]"	1:04
2.	"Uncle John’s Band (Breakdown) [Not Slated]"	1:08
3.	"Uncle John’s Band (False Start 2) [Not Slated]"	0:27
4.	"Uncle John’s Band (Complete Track) [Not Slated]"	4:44
5.	"Uncle John’s Band (Take 6 Breakdown) [Slated]"	1:02
6.	"Uncle John’s Band (Take 7 Breakdown) [Slated]"	1:46
7.	"High Time (Breakdown 1) [Not Slated]"	1:23
8.	"High Time (Breakdown 2) [Not Slated]"	1:09
9.	"High Time (Take 3 Breakdown) [Slated]"	0:25
10.	"High Time (Complete Track 1) [Not Slated]"	5:40
11.	"High Time (Studio Chatter)"	0:44
12.	"High Time (Complete Track 2) [Not Slated]"	5:32
13.	"High Time (Take 6 Breakdown) [Slated]"	0:46
14.	"High Time (Take 7 Breakdown) [Slated]"	0:17
15.	"Dire Wolf (Breakdown 1) [Not Slated]"	1:25
16.	"Dire Wolf (Complete Track 1) [Not Slated]"	2:51
17.	"Dire Wolf (Complete Track 2) [Not Slated]"	4:23
18.	"Dire Wolf (Take 2 Breakdown) [Slated]"	1:08
19.	"Dire Wolf (Take 4 False Start & Breakdown) [Slated]"	0:45
20.	"Dire Wolf (Breakdown 2) [Not Slated]"	0:57
21.	"Dire Wolf (Take 6 Breakdown) [Slated]"	1:31
22.	"Dire Wolf (Breakdown 3) [Not Slated]"	0:42
23.	"Dire Wolf (False Starts 1) [Not Slated]"	0:21
24.	"Dire Wolf (Breakdown 4) [Not Slated]"	2:18
25.	"Dire Wolf (False Start 2) [Not Slated]"	1:07
26.	"Dire Wolf (Complete Track 3) [Not Slated]"	4:26
27.	"Dire Wolf (Complete Track with Vocals) [Not Slated]"	4:36
28.	"Dire Wolf (False Start 3) [Not Slated]"	0:36
29.	"New Speedway Boogie (Demo with Acoustic Guitar, Drums & Vocals) [Not Slated]"	2:35
30.	"New Speedway Boogie (Complete Track with Vocals 1) [Not Slated]"	3:57
31.	"New Speedway Boogie (Take 2 Breakdown with Vocals) [Slated]"	1:34
32.	"New Speedway Boogie (Take 3 Breakdown with Vocals) [Slated]"	1:38
33.	"New Speedway Boogie (Mis-Named as Take 3 False Start with Vocals) [Slated]"	0:15
34.	"New Speedway Boogie (Take 4 Complete with Vocals & Lead Guitar) [Slated]"	4:26
35.	"New Speedway Boogie (Arranging Take with Vocals) [Not Slated]"	2:37
36.	"New Speedway Boogie (Breakdown with Vocals 1) [Not Slated]"	1:00
37.	"New Speedway Boogie (Breakdown with Vocals 2) [Not Slated]"	1:59
38.	"New Speedway Boogie (Complete Track With Vocals 2) [Not Slated]"	4:48
39.	"New Speedway Boogie (Take 8 With Vocals) [Slated]"	4:19
40.	"Cumberland Blues (Various Breakdowns & Take 9) [Slated]"	3:26
41.	"Black Peter (Breakdown 1) [Not Slated]"	1:05
42.	"Black Peter (Breakdown 2) [Not Slated]"	1:12
43.	"Black Peter (Studio Chatter)"	1:45
44.	"Black Peter (Breakdown 3) [Not Slated]"	5:41
45.	"Black Peter (Breakdown 4) [Not Slated]"	4:42
46.	"Black Peter (Complete Track with Vocals) [Not Slated]"	5:43
47.	"Easy Wind (Complete Track With Vocals 1) [Not Slated]"	4:53
48.	"Easy Wind (Breakdown With Vocals 1) [Not Slated]"	0:48
49.	"Easy Wind (Breakdown With Vocals 2) [Not Slated]"	4:20
50.	"Easy Wind (Breakdown With Vocals 3) [Not Slated]"	1:12
51.	"Easy Wind (Breakdown With Vocals 4) [Not Slated]"	1:04
52.	"Easy Wind (Complete Track With Vocals 2) [Not Slated]"	5:52
53.	"Easy Wind (False Starts & Breakdowns With Vocals) [Not Slated]"	1:43
54.	"Easy Wind (Incomplete Track With Vocals) [Not Slated]"	1:44
55.	"Easy Wind (Take 17 With Vocals) [Slated]"	5:42
56.	"Easy Wind (Take 18 Breakdown With Vocals) [Slated]"	0:45
57.	"Easy Wind (Take 19 Breakdown With Vocals) [Slated]"	1:05
58.	"Easy Wind (Take 20 With Vocals) [Slated]"	4:36
59.	"Easy Wind (Take 21 False Start With Vocals) [Slated]"	0:21
60.	"Easy Wind (Take 22 Breakdown With Vocals) [Slated]"	0:39
61.	"Easy Wind (Take 23 Breakdown With Vocals) [Slated]"	0:39
62.	"Casey Jones (Breakdown 1) [Not Slated]"	2:51
63.	"Casey Jones (Breakdown 2) [Not Slated]"	3:10
64.	"Casey Jones (Complete Track With Vocals) [Not Slated]"	4:34

== Personnel ==
Grateful Dead

- Jerry Garcia – lead guitar, pedal steel guitar, banjo, vocals, lead vocals on all songs except where noted
- Bob Weir – guitar, vocals, co-lead vocals on "Cumberland Blues", lead vocals on the reissue live bonus track "Dire Wolf"
- Pigpen (Ron McKernan) – keyboards, harmonica, vocals, lead vocals on "Easy Wind"
- Phil Lesh – bass, vocals
- Bill Kreutzmann – drums, percussion
- Mickey Hart – drums, percussion (absent on discs two and three of the 50th Anniversary Deluxe Edition)
- Tom Constanten – keyboards on reissue live bonus tracks "Dire Wolf", "Black Peter", "Easy Wind", "Cumberland Blues", "Mason's Children"

Additional musicians

- David Nelson – acoustic guitar on "Cumberland Blues"

Production

- Bob Matthews, Betty Cantor, Grateful Dead – producer
- Alembic – engineer
- Ramrod – equipment crew
- Rex Jackson – equipment crew
- S. Heard – equipment crew
- Jon McIntire – big nurse
- Sam Cutler – executive nanny
- Cosmic Gail – lady in waiting
- David Parker – guardians of the vault
- Bonnie Parker – guardians of the vault
- Mouse Studios, with Toon N Tree – cover photo, art, and design
- John Dawson – special thanks

Reissue production credits

- James Austin – reissue production
- David Lemieux – reissue production
- Peter McQuaid – executive producer
- Michael Wesley Johnson – associate producer and research coordination
- Eileen Law – archival research
- Cassidy Law – project coordinator
- Eric Doney – business affairs
- Nancy Mallonee – business affairs
- Malia Doss – business affairs
- Dennis McNally – Grateful mentor
- Joe Gastwirt – mastering, production consultant
- Jimmy Edwards – production manager
- Joe Motta – project coordination
- Gary Peterson – discography annotation
- Shawn Amos – liner notes coordination
- Daniel Goldmark – editorial supervision
- Hugh Brown – reissue art direction, design
- Greg Allen – reissue art direction, design
- Rachel Gutek – reissue art direction, design
- David Singer – poster on book cover

== Charts ==
Chart (1970)	Peak position
Canadian RPM 100 Albums	17
UK Albums Chart	69
US Billboard Top LP's	27
US Cash Box Top 100 Albums	26
US Record World 100 Top LP's	12

== Certifications ==
Region	Certification	Certified units/sales
United States (RIAA)	Platinum	1,000,000^{^}
^{^} Shipments figures based on certification alone.

== See also ==
- So Many Roads (1965–1995)—a 1999 box set that includes the outtake "Mason's Children"
- The Golden Road (1965–1973)—a 2001 box set which includes the entirety of this album and its re-release bonus tracks
- The Warner Bros. Studio Albums—a 2010 box set which includes this album
