= Bill Browning =

American singer-songwriter

- Born: May 16, 1931; Wayne County, West Virginia
- Died: January 23, 1977 (aged 45)
- Genre: Bluegrass

Wilmer "Bill" Browning (May 16, 1931, in Wayne, West Virginia – January 23, 1977) was an American rockabilly musician, recording studio and songwriter. He wrote the country music hit single "Dark Hollow", which was covered by both Jimmie Skinner and the Grateful Dead.

== Career ==
While working as a truck driver in 1957, Browning convinced Frank J. Videmsek, a local restaurant owner, to set up the record label Island Records and become his manager. Browning's band, the Echo Valley Boys, consisted of eight musicians. The echo Valley Boys released Browning's song "Dark Hollow" in 1958. After releasing the song, the band joined the WWVA Jamboree, and Browning recruited Wayne Moss into the Echo Valley Boys. Browning left Island Records at the end of 1958 for Starday Records where he recorded four album sides.

Browning returned to truck driving in the early 1960s and eventually established the Midway Recording Studio, recording country music and gospel artists in West Virginia, Ohio, and Kentucky. He continued driving trucks also.

== Death ==
Browning had been diagnosed with colitis but in 1975 he discovered that it was actually cancer. He died January 23, 1977, at age 45. He was survived by his wife, Doris Jean, and children.

== Discography ==
=== Island Records ===
- "Wash Machine Boogie"
- "Ramblin' Man" (as the Echo Valley Boys)
- "One Day A Month"/
- "Don't Wait Too Late"
- "Makes You Feel-a So Good"
- "Hula Rock"
- "Breaking Hearts"
- "Lay Me Low"
- "First Prayer"
- "Let The Bible Be Your Guide"
- "Borned [original spelling] With The Blues"
- "Dark Hollow"
- "Gonna Be A Fire"
- "Down In The Holler Where Sally Lives" on a 45 EP labeled "W.W.V.A. Jamboree Special" that also included two songs each from the Cook Brothers, Buddy Durham and Hardrock Gunter.
- "Just Because You Say Your [original spelling] Sorry"
- "Sinful Woman"

=== Starday Records ===
- "Don't Push Don't Shove"
- "Dark Valley Walls"
- "Down In The Hollow"
- "Country Strings"

=== Salem Records ===
- "She's Not Such A Bad Girl"
- "Lookout Girl"

=== Marbone Records (Browning's label) ===
- "Marbone Swamp"
- "It's A Long, Long Way"
- "I Heard That Train A-comin'"
- "Dear Mom"
- "I Was Touched By The Master's Hand"
- "Precious Memories" (as Bill Browning and the Hilanders)

=== Alta Records (Browning's label) ===
- "He Sent His Only Son"
- "People"
- Bill Browning and the Hilanders (album)
- "Gone Astray"
- "The Church Is Gone"
- "How Great Thou Art"
- "I Believe In Jesus"
- "I've Been Saved"
- Today Was Yesterday's Future"
- "Oh Lord, Do You Remember Me"
- "Soul Salvation"
- "There'll Be Singing"
- "Don't Wait Too Late"
