= Raymond Robertson =

Raymond Robertson may refer to:

- Raymond Robertson (politician), Scottish Conservative Party politician, former MP
- Ray Robertson, Canadian writer

== See also ==
- Raymond Robertson-Glasgow (1901–1965), British cricketer and cricket writer
