= Here Comes Sunshine 1973 =

Live album and box set by Grateful Dead
- Released: June 30, 2023
- Recorded: May 13 – June 10, 1973
- Genre: Rock
- Label: Rhino
- Producer: Grateful Dead

Grateful Dead chronology
| Dave's Picks Volume 46 (2023) | Here Comes Sunshine 1973 (2023) | RFK Stadium, Washington, D.C. 6/10/73 (2023) |

Grateful Dead concert box set chronology
| In and Out of the Garden: Madison Square Garden '81, '82, '83 (2022) | Here Comes Sunshine 1973 (2023) | Friend of the Devils: April 1978 (2024) |

Here Comes Sunshine 1973 is a live album by the rock band the Grateful Dead. Packaged as a box set, it contains five complete concerts on 17 CDs. It was recorded in May and June 1973. It was released on June 30, 2023, in a limited edition of 10,000 copies.

Here Comes Sunshine 1973 contains recordings of these concerts:

- May 13, 1973 – Iowa State Fairgrounds, Des Moines, Iowa
- May 20, 1973 – Campus Stadium, Santa Barbara, California
- May 26, 1973 – Kezar Stadium, San Francisco, California
- June 9, 1973 – Robert F. Kennedy Stadium, Washington, D.C.
- June 10, 1973 – Robert F. Kennedy Stadium, Washington, D.C.

The box set also includes a poster and a tenugui.

At the June 10 concert, Dickey Betts and Butch Trucks from the Allman Brothers Band sat in for the final set of music. The song "It Takes a Lot to Laugh, It Takes a Train to Cry" from that set was previously released on the album Postcards of the Hanging.

The June 10 concert was also produced as a separate album called RFK Stadium, Washington, D.C. 6/10/73. It was released as a four-disc CD on June 30, 2023, and as an eight-disc LP on July 28, 2023.

== Track listing ==
Disc 1

May 13, 1973 – Iowa State Fairgrounds – first set:

1. "Promised Land" (Chuck Berry) – 3:48
2. "Deal" (Jerry Garcia, Robert Hunter) – 5:11
3. "Mexicali Blues" (Bob Weir, John Perry Barlow) – 3:56
4. "They Love Each Other" (Garcia, Hunter) – 5:49
5. "Box of Rain" (Phil Lesh, Hunter) – 5:35
6. "Loser" (Garcia, Hunter) – 6:55
7. "Beat It On Down the Line" (Jesse Fuller) – 3:32
8. "China Cat Sunflower" > (Garcia, Hunter) – 6:44
9. "I Know You Rider" (traditional, arranged by Grateful Dead) – 5:50
10. "El Paso" (Marty Robbins) – 5:18
11. "Row Jimmy" (Garcia, Hunter) – 9:03
12. "Me and My Uncle" (John Phillips) – 3:49
13. "Don't Ease Me In" > (traditional, arranged by Grateful Dead) – 3:40
14. "Around and Around" (Berry) – 4:41

Disc 2

May 13, 1973 – Iowa State Fairgrounds – second set:

1. "Tennessee Jed" (Garcia, Hunter) – 8:12
2. "Big River" (Johnny Cash) – 5:10
3. "Bertha" (Garcia, Hunter) – 6:22
4. "Jack Straw" (Weir, Hunter) – 5:01
5. "Sugaree" (Garcia, Hunter) – 7:36
6. "Looks Like Rain" (Weir, Barlow) – 7:36
7. "Here Comes Sunshine" (Garcia, Hunter) – 10:37
8. "Playing in the Band" (Weir, Mickey Hart, Hunter) – 29:10

Disc 3

May 13, 1973 – Iowa State Fairgrounds – third set, part one:

1. "Mississippi Half-Step Uptown Toodeloo" (Garcia, Hunter) – 9:16
2. "Greatest Story Ever Told" (Weir, Hart, Hunter) – 5:50
3. "Brown-Eyed Women" (Garcia, Hunter) – 5:28

May 13, 1973 – Iowa State Fairgrounds – encore:

4. "Casey Jones" (Garcia, Hunter) – 7:42

Disc 4

May 13, 1973 – Iowa State Fairgrounds – third set, part two:

1. "He's Gone" > (Garcia, Hunter) – 14:38
2. "Truckin'" > (Garcia, Weir, Lesh, Hunter) – 13:23
3. "The Other One" > (Weir, Bill Kreutzmann) – 19:07
4. "Eyes of the World" > (Garcia, Hunter) – 16:04
5. "China Doll" (Garcia, Hunter) – 6:20
6. "Sugar Magnolia" (Weir, Hunter) – 9:29

Disc 5

May 20, 1973 – Campus Stadium – first set:

1. "Bertha" (Garcia, Hunter) – 6:14
2. "Me and My Uncle" (Phillips) – 3:15
3. "Box of Rain" (Lesh, Hunter) – 5:07
4. "Deal" (Garcia, Hunter) – 4:49
5. "Looks Like Rain" (Weir, Barlow) – 6:55
6. "Tennessee Jed" (Garcia, Hunter) – 8:07
7. "The Race Is On" (Don Rollins) – 3:03
8. "China Cat Sunflower" > (Garcia, Hunter) – 7:57
9. "I Know You Rider" (traditional, arranged by Grateful Dead) – 5:33
10. "Beat It On Down the Line" (Fuller) – 3:15
11. "They Love Each Other" (Garcia, Hunter) – 5:39
12. "Playing in the Band" (Weir, Hart, Hunter) – 19:29

Disc 6

May 20, 1973 – Campus Stadium – second set:

1. "Promised Land" (Berry) – 3:37
2. "Brown-Eyed Women" (Garcia, Hunter) – 5:40
3. "Mexicali Blues" (Weir, Barlow) – 4:06
4. "Row Jimmy" (Garcia, Hunter) – 8:30
5. "Jack Straw" (Weir, Hunter) – 5:17
6. "Big Railroad Blues" (Noah Lewis, arranged by Grateful Dead) – 4:14
7. "Greatest Story Ever Told" (Weir, Hart, Hunter) – 5:04
8. "Here Comes Sunshine" (Garcia, Hunter) – 10:31
9. "Big River" (Cash) – 4:57
10. "Loser" (Garcia, Hunter) – 7:00
11. "El Paso" (Robbins) – 4:23
12. "Casey Jones" (Garcia, Hunter) – 6:58

Disc 7

May 20, 1973 – Campus Stadium – third set:

1. "Truckin'" > (Garcia, Weir, Lesh, Hunter) – 9:04
2. "Jam" > (Grateful Dead) – 11:16
3. "The Other One" > (Weir, Kreutzmann) – 10:37
4. "Eyes of the World" > (Garcia, Hunter) – 12:12
5. "Stella Blue" (Garcia, Hunter) – 8:11
6. "Sugar Magnolia" (Weir, Hunter) – 10:14

May 20, 1973 – Campus Stadium – encore:

7. "Johnny B. Goode" (Berry) – 4:01

Disc 8

May 26, 1973 – Kezar Stadium – first set:

1. "Promised Land" (Berry) – 3:26
2. "Deal" (Garcia, Hunter) – 5:17
3. "Jack Straw" (Weir, Hunter) – 5:07
4. "Tennessee Jed" (Garcia, Hunter) – 7:53
5. "The Race Is On" (Rollins) – 3:42
6. "Sugaree" (Garcia, Hunter) – 7:57
7. "Mexicali Blues" (Weir, Barlow) – 3:57
8. "Row Jimmy" (Garcia, Hunter) – 8:40
9. "Looks Like Rain" (Weir, Barlow) – 7:34
10. "They Love Each Other" (Garcia, Hunter) – 5:33
11. "Playing in the Band" (Weir, Hart, Hunter) – 17:04

Disc 9

May 26, 1973 – Kezar Stadium – second set:

1. "Here Comes Sunshine" (Garcia, Hunter) – 11:26
2. "El Paso" (Robbins) – 5:04
3. "Loser" (Garcia, Hunter) – 7:10
4. "Beat It On Down the Line" (Fuller) – 3:41
5. "You Ain't Woman Enough" (Loretta Lynn) – 3:28
6. "Box of Rain" (Lesh, Hunter) – 5:27
7. "China Cat Sunflower" > (Garcia, Hunter) – 7:37
8. "I Know You Rider" (traditional, arranged by Grateful Dead) – 5:29
9. "Big River" (Cash) – 5:19
10. "Bertha" (Garcia, Hunter) – 5:59
11. "Around and Around" (Berry) – 4:55

May 26, 1973 – Kezar Stadium – third set, part one:

12. "Mississippi Half-Step Uptown Toodeloo" (Garcia, Hunter) – 8:44
13. "Me and My Uncle" (Phillips) – 3:08

Disc 10

May 26, 1973 – Kezar Stadium – third set, part two:

1. "He's Gone" > (Garcia, Hunter) – 14:12
2. "Truckin'" > (Garcia, Weir, Lesh, Hunter) – 9:05
3. "The Other One" > (Weir, Kreutzmann) – 17:32
4. "Eyes of the World" > (Garcia, Hunter) – 13:41
5. "China Doll" (Garcia, Hunter) – 6:38
6. "Sugar Magnolia" (Weir, Hunter) – 9:11

May 26, 1973 – Kezar Stadium – encore:

7. "Casey Jones" (Garcia, Hunter) – 7:04

Disc 11

June 9, 1973 – Robert F. Kennedy Stadium – first set:

1. "Promised Land" (Berry) – 3:24
2. "Deal" (Garcia, Hunter) – 5:04
3. "Looks Like Rain" (Weir, Barlow) – 7:12
4. "They Love Each Other" (Garcia, Hunter) – 5:53
5. "Jack Straw" (Weir, Hunter) – 5:07
6. "Loose Lucy" (Garcia, Hunter) – 8:43
7. "Mexicali Blues" (Weir, Barlow) – 4:11
8. "Row Jimmy" (Garcia, Hunter) – 8:46
9. "El Paso" (Robbins) – 4:56
10. "Box of Rain" (Lesh, Hunter) – 5:39
11. "Sugaree" (Garcia, Hunter) – 8:24
12. "Beat It On Down the Line" (Fuller) – 3:48
13. "Tennessee Jed" (Garcia, Hunter) – 8:05

Disc 12

June 9, 1973 – Robert F. Kennedy Stadium – second set, part one:

1. "Greatest Story Ever Told" (Weir, Hart, Hunter) – 5:42
2. "China Cat Sunflower" > (Garcia, Hunter) – 7:52
3. "I Know You Rider" (traditional, arranged by Grateful Dead) – 6:14
4. "He's Gone" > (Garcia, Hunter) – 14:20
5. "Truckin'" > (Garcia, Weir, Lesh, Hunter) – 12:33
6. "Playing in the Band" (Weir, Hart, Hunter) – 22:43

Disc 13

June 9, 1973 – Robert F. Kennedy Stadium – second set, part two:

1. "Loser" (Garcia, Hunter) – 7:02
2. "Me and My Uncle" (Phillips) – 3:38
3. "Mississippi Half-Step Uptown Toodeloo" (Garcia, Hunter) – 7:12
4. "Big River" (Cash) – 5:08
5. "Eyes of the World" > (Garcia, Hunter) – 11:28
6. "China Doll" (Garcia, Hunter) – 6:42
7. "Sugar Magnolia" (Weir, Hunter) – 8:29

Disc 14

June 10, 1973 – Robert F. Kennedy Stadium – first set, part one:

1. "Morning Dew" (Bonnie Dobson, Tim Rose) – 11:55
2. "Beat It On Down the Line" (Fuller) – 3:41
3. "Ramble On Rose" (Garcia, Hunter) – 6:59
4. "Jack Straw" (Weir, Hunter) – 5:30
5. "Wave That Flag" (Garcia, Hunter) – 6:14
6. "Looks Like Rain" (Weir, Barlow) – 8:03
7. "Box of Rain" (Lesh, Hunter) – 5:12
8. "They Love Each Other" (Garcia, Hunter) – 5:23
9. "The Race Is On" (Rollins) – 3:34
10. "Row Jimmy" (Garcia, Hunter) – 9:36
11. "El Paso" (Robbins) – 4:34

Disc 15

June 10, 1973 – Robert F. Kennedy Stadium – first set, part two:

1. "Bird Song" (Garcia, Hunter) – 12:08
2. "Playing in the Band" (Weir, Hart, Hunter) – 18:01

June 10, 1973 – Robert F. Kennedy Stadium – second set, part one:

3. "Eyes of the World" > (Garcia, Hunter) – 22:06
4. "Stella Blue" (Garcia, Hunter) – 8:14
5. "Big River" (Cash) – 5:17
6. "Here Comes Sunshine" (Garcia, Hunter) – 10:54

Disc 16

June 10, 1973 – Robert F. Kennedy Stadium – second set, part two:

1. "Around and Around" (Berry) – 6:16
2. "Dark Star" > (Garcia, Hart, Kreutzmann, Lesh, Ron McKernan, Weir, Hunter) – 26:37
3. "He's Gone" > (Garcia, Hunter) – 14:34
4. "Wharf Rat" > (Garcia, Hunter) – 8:04
5. "Truckin'" (Garcia, Weir, Lesh, Hunter) – 7:53
6. "Sugar Magnolia" (Weir, Hunter) – 9:51

Disc 17

June 10, 1973 – Robert F. Kennedy Stadium – third set:

1. "It Takes a Lot to Laugh, It Takes a Train to Cry" (Bob Dylan) – 8:12
2. "That's All Right" (Arthur Crudup) – 12:52
3. "Promised Land" (Berry) – 4:49
4. "Not Fade Away" > (Norman Petty, Charles Hardin) – 11:27
5. "Goin' Down the Road Feeling Bad" > (traditional, arranged by Grateful Dead) – 10:36
6. "Drums" > (Kreutzmann) – 5:52
7. "Not Fade Away" (Petty, Hardin) – 3:33
8. "Johnny B. Goode" (Berry) – 3:18

== Personnel ==
Grateful Dead

- Jerry Garcia – guitar, vocals
- Bob Weir – guitar, vocals
- Phil Lesh – bass guitar, vocals
- Bill Kreutzmann – drums
- Keith Godchaux – keyboards
- Donna Jean Godchaux – vocals

Additional musicians

- Dickey Betts – guitar – June 10, 1973 third set
- Butch Trucks – drums – June 10, 1973 third set

Production

- Produced by Grateful Dead
- Produced for release by David Lemieux
- Associate Producer: Ivette Ramos
- Mastering: Jeffrey Norman
- Recording: Kidd Candelario, Betty Cantor-Jackson, Owsley Stanley
- Tape to digital transfers and speed correction: John K. Chester, Jamie Howarth – Plangent Processes
- Artwork, package design: Masaki Koike
- Liner notes: Ray Robertson, The Owsley Stanley Foundation, David Lemieux
