= Road Trips Full Show: Spectrum 11/6/79 =

Live album by Grateful Dead
- Released: September 10, 2008
- Recorded: November 6, 1979
- Label: Grateful Dead Productions

Grateful Dead chronology
Road Trips Full Show: Spectrum 11/5/79 (2008)	Road Trips Full Show: Spectrum 11/6/79 (2008)	Road Trips Volume 1 Number 2 (2008)

Road Trips Full Show: Spectrum 11/6/79 is a spin-off of the Road Trips series which continues the tradition of releasing full shows of the band the Grateful Dead in download formats (both MP3 and FLAC) started with the Download Series. It was released by Grateful Dead Productions on September 10, 2008, ten months after the release of Road Trips Volume 1 Number 1, and is a full show from the same tour as that release. It is a two disc release of a complete show the band performed on November 6, 1979 at the Spectrum in Philadelphia, Pennsylvania. This release was accompanied by the concurrent release of the show from the previous evening as Road Trips Full Show: Spectrum 11/5/79.

== Track listing ==
Disc one

First set:

1. "Alabama Getaway" > (Garcia, Hunter)
2. "Promised Land" (Chuck Berry)
3. "Tennessee Jed" (Garcia, Hunter)
4. "Me & My Uncle" > (John Phillips)
5. "Mexicali Blues" (Weir, Barlow)
6. "Candyman" (Garcia, Hunter)
7. "Easy To Love You" (Mydland, Barlow)
8. "Looks Like Rain" (Weir, Barlow)
9. "Jack-A-Roe" (Traditional)
10. "Jack Straw" > (Weir, Hunter)
11. "Deal" (Garcia, Hunter)

Disc two

Second set:

1. "Terrapin Station" > (Garcia, Hunter)
2. "Playing In The Band" > (Weir, Hart, Hunter)
3. "Drums" > (Grateful Dead)
4. "Space" > (Grateful Dead)
5. "Black Peter" > (Garcia, Hunter)
6. "Good Lovin' " (Clarke, Resnick)

Encore:

7. "U.S. Blues" (Garcia, Hunter)

== Personnel ==
- Jerry Garcia: lead guitar, vocals
- Mickey Hart: drums
- Bill Kreutzmann: drums
- Phil Lesh: electric bass
- Brent Mydland: keyboards, vocals
- Bob Weir: rhythm guitar, vocals
