= Japantown, Salt Lake City =

Coordinates: 40°46′02″N 111°53′54″W

Japantown
- Nickname: Little Tokyo
- Country: United States
- State: Utah
- City-county: Salt Lake City

Japantown, also known as Little Tokyo, is a neighbourhood in Salt Lake City, Utah. While currently consisting of one street, it was previously one of the largest Japantowns in the United States.

== Location ==
The current Japantown consists of one street, Japantown Street, which runs from Second to Third West on 100 South. Previously, Japantown covered many blocks and was one of the largest Japantowns in the United States.

== History ==
As part of Japanese immigration to the United States in the late nineteenth century, Japanese people came to Utah to work on the railroads, in agriculture and in mines. In 1902, Edward Daigoro Hashimoto, a former railroad worker, launched the E.D. Hashimoto Company in what would become known as Japantown. The company was a labour agency and also provided Japanese items, including food and clothing, to the Japanese population. There were over 2000 people in Japantown by 1910, initially with a high male-to-female ratio.

By 1918, the Salt Lake Buddhist Temple had been built. The Japanese Church of Christ was built in 1924. These two buildings form most of the surviving Japantown. However, in the 1920s, Japantown contained two Japanese-language newspapers (including the Utah Nippo, 1914-1991), a Japanese language school, dance studios, restaurants and stores, covering an area of several blocks.

World War II brought considerable changes. Japanese American internment was introduced in 1942, including the Topaz War Relocation Center near Delta, Utah. When Topaz was shut in late 1945 and even before then, some of those who had been moved to Topaz moved on to Japantown, tripling its population.

In 1969, as part of a failed bid for the 1972 Olympic Winter Games, most of Japantown were destroyed to build the Salt Palace arena. Business owners were forced to sell up under eminent domain rules. Only a small amount of Japantown survived.

In the early 2000s, the Japanese Community Preservation Committee was founded by several people, including Jani Iwamoto, later a Utah state senator, and started advocating for the area.

== Attractions ==
The Obon Festival is held at the Salt Lake Buddhist Temple on the second Saturday in July.

== Notable buildings ==
- Japanese Church of Christ
- Salt Lake Buddhist Temple
