= RFK Stadium, Washington, D.C. 6/10/73 =

Live album by Grateful Dead
- Released: June 30, 2023
- Recorded: June 10, 1973
- Venue: Robert F. Kennedy Stadium
- Genre: Rock
- Length: 281:22
- Label: Rhino
- Producer: Grateful Dead

Grateful Dead chronology
Here Comes Sunshine 1973 (2023)	RFK Stadium, Washington, D.C. 6/10/73 (2023)	Dave's Picks Volume 47 (2023)

RFK Stadium, Washington, D.C. 6/10/73 is a live album by the rock band the Grateful Dead. It contains the complete concert recorded at Robert F. Kennedy Stadium in Washington, D.C., on June 10, 1973. It was released as a four-disc CD on June 30, 2023, and as an eight-disc LP on July 28, 2023.

At this concert, the opening acts were Wet Willie and the Allman Brothers Band. Even by the band's standards, this is a long Dead show (the longest of their career): a first set of over an hour and forty minutes; a two-hour second set; and an hour-long encore. Joining the Grateful Dead onstage for that third set of music were Dickey Betts and Butch Trucks from the Allman Brothers Band.

The song "It Takes a Lot to Laugh, It Takes a Train to Cry" was previously released on the album Postcards of the Hanging. The songs "Bird Song" and "Here Comes Sunshine" were previously released on day 10 of the digital download event 30 Days of Dead 2011 and day 25 of 30 Days of Dead 2017 respectively.

The June 10 concert recording was also released on June 30, 2023 as part of the five-show, 17-CD box set Here Comes Sunshine 1973.

== Track listing ==
Disc 1

First set, part one:

1. "Morning Dew" (Bonnie Dobson, Tim Rose) – 11:55
2. "Beat It On Down the Line" (Jesse Fuller) – 3:41
3. "Ramble On Rose" (Jerry Garcia, Robert Hunter) – 6:59
4. "Jack Straw" (Bob Weir, Hunter) – 5:30
5. "Wave That Flag" (Garcia, Hunter) – 6:14
6. "Looks Like Rain" (Weir, John Perry Barlow) – 8:03
7. "Box of Rain" (Phil Lesh, Hunter) – 5:12
8. "They Love Each Other" (Garcia, Hunter) – 5:23
9. "The Race Is On" (Don Rollins) – 3:34
10. "Row Jimmy" (Garcia, Hunter) – 9:36
11. "El Paso" (Marty Robbins) – 4:34

Disc 2

First set, part two:

1. "Bird Song" (Garcia, Hunter) – 12:08
2. "Playing in the Band" (Weir, Mickey Hart, Hunter) – 18:01

Second set, part one:

3. "Eyes of the World" > (Garcia, Hunter) – 22:06
4. "Stella Blue" (Garcia, Hunter) – 8:14
5. "Big River" (Johnny Cash) – 5:17
6. "Here Comes Sunshine" (Garcia, Hunter) – 10:54

Disc 3

Second set, part two:

1. "Around and Around" (Chuck Berry) – 6:16
2. "Dark Star" > (Garcia, Hart, Bill Kreutzmann, Lesh, Ron McKernan, Weir, Hunter) – 26:37
3. "He's Gone" > (Garcia, Hunter) – 14:34
4. "Wharf Rat" > (Garcia, Hunter) – 8:04
5. "Truckin'" (Garcia, Lesh, Weir, Hunter) – 7:53
6. "Sugar Magnolia" (Weir, Hunter) – 9:51

Disc 4

Third set:

1. "It Takes a Lot to Laugh, It Takes a Train to Cry" (Bob Dylan) – 8:12
2. "That's All Right" (Arthur Crudup) – 12:52
3. "Promised Land" (Berry) – 4:49
4. "Not Fade Away" > (Norman Petty, Charles Hardin) – 11:27
5. "Goin' Down the Road Feeling Bad" > (traditional, arranged by Grateful Dead) – 10:36
6. "Drums" > (Kreutzmann, Butch Trucks) – 5:52
7. "Not Fade Away" (Petty, Hardin) – 3:33
8. "Johnny B. Goode" (Berry) – 3:18

== Personnel ==
Grateful Dead

- Jerry Garcia – guitar, vocals
- Bob Weir – guitar, vocals
- Phil Lesh – bass guitar, vocals
- Bill Kreutzmann – drums
- Keith Godchaux – keyboards
- Donna Jean Godchaux – vocals

Additional musicians

- Dickey Betts – guitar (third set)
- Butch Trucks – drums (third set)

Production

- Produced by Grateful Dead
- Produced for release by David Lemieux
- Executive producer: Mark Pinkus
- Associated producers: Ivette Ramos, Doran Tyson
- Mastering: Jeffrey Norman
- Recording: Owsley Stanley
- Tape restoration and speed correction: Jamie Howarth
- Art direction, design: Masaki Koike
- Creative supervision: Lisa Glines, Doran Tyson
- Package supervision: Shannon Ward
- Liner notes essay: Ray Robertson
