= Road Trips Volume 1 Number 2 =

Live album by Grateful Dead
- Released: February 4, 2008
- Recorded: October 1977
- Genre: Rock
- Length: 158:20 bonus disc: 79:28
- Label: Grateful Dead
- Producer: Grateful Dead

Grateful Dead chronology
Road Trips Full Show: Spectrum 11/6/79 (2008)	Road Trips Volume 1 Number 2 (2008)	Winterland 1973: The Complete Recordings (2008)

Alternative cover
- Road Trips Volume 1 Number 2 Bonus Disc

Professional ratings
Review scores
Source	Rating
All About Jazz	(favorable)
Allmusic	4/5 stars
The Music Box	4.5/5 stars

Road Trips Volume 1 Number 2 is a live album by the American rock band the Grateful Dead, the second in their "Road Trips" series of archival releases. It was recorded in October 1977, and released on February 4, 2008.

Road Trips Volume 1 Number 2 contains material from four different concerts, recorded over a two-week period at venues in New Mexico, Oklahoma, Texas, and Louisiana.

Portions of the 10/11/77 show from Norman, Oklahoma can also be found as bonus tracks on Dick's Picks Volume 29.

== Track listing ==
Disc 1
No.	Title	Recording venue and date	Length
1.	"Let It Grow" (Bob Weir, John Perry Barlow)	Lloyd Noble Center, 10/11/77	10:17
2.	"Sugaree" (Jerry Garcia, Robert Hunter)	Assembly Center, 10/16/77	17:41
3.	"The Music Never Stopped" (Weir, Barlow)	Assembly Center, 10/16/77	8:59
4.	"Mississippi Half-Step Uptown Toodeloo >" (Garcia, Hunter)	Hofheinz Pavilion, 10/14/77	11:53
5.	"El Paso" (Marty Robbins)	Hofheinz Pavilion, 10/14/77	4:52
6.	"Help On the Way >" (Garcia, Hunter)	Lloyd Noble Center, 10/11/77	5:48
7.	"Slipknot! >" (Garcia, Keith Godchaux, Phil Lesh, Weir)	Lloyd Noble Center, 10/11/77	4:02
8.	"Franklin's Tower" (Garcia, Bill Kreutzmann, Hunter)	Lloyd Noble Center, 10/11/77	14:59

Disc 2
No.	Title	Recording venue and date	Length
1.	"Playing in the Band" (Weir, Mickey Hart, Hunter)	Hofheinz Pavilion, 10/14/77	17:12
2.	"Drums >" (Hart, Kreutzmann)	Assembly Center, 10/16/77	3:09
3.	"The Other One >" (Weir)	Assembly Center, 10/16/77	8:24
4.	"Good Lovin' " (Arthur Resnick, Rudy Clark)	Assembly Center, 10/16/77	5:53
5.	"Terrapin Station >" (Garcia, Hunter)	Assembly Center, 10/16/77	11:29
6.	"Black Peter >" (Garcia, Hunter)	Assembly Center, 10/16/77	13:17
7.	"Around and Around" (Chuck Berry)	Assembly Center, 10/16/77	9:08
8.	"Brokedown Palace >" (Garcia, Hunter)	Hofheinz Pavilion, 10/14/77	5:51
9.	"Playing In the Band reprise" (Weir, Hart, Hunter)	Hofheinz Pavilion, 10/14/77	5:23

Bonus Disc
No.	Title	Recording venue and date	Length
1.	"Scarlet Begonias >" (Garcia, Hunter)	Assembly Center, 10/16/77	10:02
2.	"Fire On the Mountain" (Hart, Hunter)	Assembly Center, 10/16/77	9:31
3.	"Estimated Prophet" (Weir, Barlow)	Assembly Center, 10/16/77	12:04
4.	"Loser" (Garcia, Hunter)	Hofheinz Pavilion, 10/14/77	7:55
5.	"Sunrise" (Donna Godchaux)	Lloyd Noble Center, 10/11/77	3:56
6.	"Iko Iko >" (James Crawford)	University of New Mexico, 10/7/77	7:05
7.	"The Wheel >" (Garcia, Kreutzmann, Hunter)	University of New Mexico, 10/7/77	5:30
8.	"Wharf Rat >" (Garcia, Hunter)	University of New Mexico, 10/7/77	13:31
9.	"Sugar Magnolia" (Weir, Hunter)	University of New Mexico, 10/7/77	9:48

== Personnel ==
=== Grateful Dead ===
- Jerry Garcia – lead guitar, vocals
- Donna Godchaux – vocals
- Keith Godchaux – keyboards
- Mickey Hart – drums
- Bill Kreutzmann – drums
- Phil Lesh – electric bass
- Bob Weir – rhythm guitar, vocals

=== Production ===
- Produced by Grateful Dead
- Compilation produced by David Lemieux and Blair Jackson
- Recorded by Betty Cantor-Jackson
- Edited and mastered by Jeffrey Norman at Garage Audio Mastering
- Cover art by Scott McDougall
- Photos by Bob Minkin and Ed Perlstein
- Package design by Steve Vance
- Liner notes written by Steve Silberman

== Sound quality ==
A label on the CD case for Road Trips Volume 1 Number 2 states, "The compact discs herein have been digitally remastered directly from original analog reel-to-reel tapes. They are historical snapshots, not modern professional recordings, and may therefore exhibit occasional technical anomalies and unavoidable ravages of time."

The album was released in HDCD format. This provides enhanced sound quality when played on CD players with HDCD capability, and is fully compatible with regular CD players.

== Concert set lists ==
The complete set lists for the October 7, 11, 14 and 16, 1977 Southwest Tour concerts from which this recording was taken were:

University of New Mexico, Albuquerque, New Mexico – 10/7/77

- First Set: "Mississippi Half-Step Uptown Toodeloo", "Jack Straw", "Peggy-O", "El Paso", "They Love Each Other", "Big River", "Dupree's Diamond Blues", "Let It Grow", "Deal"
- Second Set: "Samson & Delilah", "Sunrise", "Ramble On Rose", "Passenger", "Terrapin Station", "Playing in the Band", "Drums", "Iko Iko"**, "The Wheel"**, "Wharf Rat"**, "Sugar Magnolia"**
- Encore: "One More Saturday Night"

Lloyd Noble Center, Norman, Oklahoma – 10/11/77

- First Set: "Help on the Way"*, "Slipknot!"*, "Franklin's Tower"*, "Jack Straw", "Peggy-O", "El Paso", "Sunrise"**, "Deal", "Let It Grow"*
- Second Set: "Dancin' in the Streets"***, "Dire Wolf"***, "Estimated Prophet", "Eyes of the World", "Not Fade Away"***, "Wharf Rat"***, "Around and Around"***

Hofheinz Pavilion, Houston, Texas – 10/14/77

- First Set: "Jack Straw", "Mississippi Half-Step Uptown Toodeloo"*, "El Paso"*, "Brown-Eyed Women", "New Minglewood Blues", "Loser"**, "Passenger", "Friend of the Devil", "Me & My Uncle", "Tennessee Jed", "The Music Never Stopped"
- Second Set: "Bertha", "Good Lovin' ", "Candyman", "Playing in the Band"*, "Drums", "The Wheel", "Wharf Rat", "Around and Around"
- Encore: "Brokedown Palace"*, "Playing in the Band"*

Assembly Center, Baton Rouge, Louisiana – 10/16/77

- First Set: "Promised Land", "Sugaree"*, "Cassidy", "Loser", "New Minglewood Blues", "Friend of the Devil", "Sunrise", "Dire Wolf", "The Music Never Stopped"*
- Second Set: "Scarlet Begonias"**, "Fire on the Mountain"**, "Estimated Prophet"**, "Drums"*, "The Other One"*, "Good Lovin' "*, "Terrapin Station"*, "Black Peter"*, "Around and Around"*
- Encore: "U.S. Blues"

* appears on Road Trips Volume 1 Number 2
** appears on bonus disc
*** appears on Dick's Picks Volume 29
