= Go to Nassau =

Live album by Grateful Dead
- Released: October 22, 2002
- Recorded: May 15–16, 1980
- Genre: Rock
- Length: 156:03
- Label: Arista

Grateful Dead chronology
Dick's Picks Volume 26 (2002)	Go to Nassau (2002)	Dick's Picks Volume 27 (2003)

Professional ratings
Review scores
Source	Rating
AllMusic	3/5 stars
The Music Box	4/5 stars

Go to Nassau is a two-CD live album by the rock group the Grateful Dead. It was recorded on May 15 and 16, 1980, at Nassau Coliseum in Uniondale, New York. The album, released in 2002, presents half of the songs played on the final two nights of a three-day run at the venue. It is sequenced to represent a prototypical single Dead concert, similarly to Without a Net. The shows were recorded for the King Biscuit Flower Hour and selections were originally broadcast on FM radio stations, on June 22, 1980. The album's title is a syllepsis, referring figuratively to the band's then-current album, Go to Heaven (from which six songs are represented), and literally to the band going to Nassau County to perform.

== Track listing ==
=== Disc One ===
1. "Jack Straw" → (Robert Hunter, Bob Weir) – 6:34
2. "Franklin's Tower" (Hunter, Jerry Garcia, Bill Kreutzmann) – 11:58
3. "New Minglewood Blues" (traditional, arr. Weir) – 7:35
4. "High Time" (Hunter, Garcia) – 8:52
5. "Lazy Lightnin' " → (John Perry Barlow, Weir) – 3:44
6. "Supplication" (Barlow, Weir) – 6:41
7. "Peggy-O" (trad., arr. Grateful Dead) – 7:32
8. "Far From Me" (Brent Mydland) – 4:02
9. "Looks Like Rain" (Barlow, Weir) – 8:12
10. "China Cat Sunflower" → (Hunter, Garcia) – 5:16
11. "I Know You Rider" (trad., arr. Grateful Dead) – 6:30

=== Disc Two ===
1. "Feel Like A Stranger" → (Barlow, Weir) – 9:29
2. "Althea" → (Hunter, Garcia) – 8:22
3. "Lost Sailor" → (Barlow, Weir) – 5:49
4. "Saint Of Circumstance" (Barlow, Weir) – 6:45
5. "Alabama Getaway" (Hunter, Garcia) – 4:50
6. "Playing In The Band" → (Hunter, Mickey Hart, Weir) – 8:03
7. "Uncle John's Band" → (Hunter, Garcia) – 8:25
8. "Drums" → (Hart, Kreutzmann) – 5:26 (Note: Edited version of performance)
9. "Space" → (Grateful Dead) – 2:46
10. "Not Fade Away" → (Buddy Holly, Norman Petty) – 4:52
11. "Goin' Down The Road Feeling Bad" → (trad., arr. Grateful Dead) – 6:49
12. "Good Lovin' " (Artie Resnick, Rudy Clark) – 7:23

== Recording dates ==
- May 15, 1980: Disc 1 tracks 1–2 & 5–8, disc 2 tracks 5–12
- May 16, 1980: Disc 1 tracks 3–4 & 9–11, disc 2 tracks 1–4

== Personnel ==
=== Grateful Dead ===
- Jerry Garcia – guitar, vocals
- Bob Weir – guitar, vocals
- Phil Lesh – electric bass
- Brent Mydland – keyboards, vocals
- Mickey Hart – drums, percussion
- Bill Kreutzmann – drums

=== Production ===
- Jeffrey Norman – mixing
- David Lemieux – compilation producer
- Cassidy Law – album coordination
- Eileen Law – archival research
- Rudson Shurtliff – assistant engineer
- Amy Finkle – package design
- Robert Minkin – photography
- Jim Anderson – photography
