= Dick's Picks Volume 28 =

Live album by Grateful Dead
- Released: April 20, 2003
- Recorded: February 26 and 28, 1973
- Genres: Jam; Folk rock Psychedelic rock
- Length: 304:05
- Label: Grateful Dead Records

Grateful Dead chronology
View from the Vault IV (2003)	Dick's Picks Volume 28 (2003)	Dick's Picks Volume 29 (2003)

Professional ratings
Review scores
Source	Rating
Allmusic	4.5/5 stars
The Music Box	4/5 stars

Dick's Picks Volume 28 is an album by the rock band the Grateful Dead. Released on four CDs on April 20, 2003, it is the 28th installment of the Dick's Picks archival series. It was principally recorded February 26, 1973 at the Pershing Municipal Auditorium in Lincoln, Nebraska, and February 28, 1973 at the Salt Palace in Salt Lake City, Utah.

== Contents ==
Dick's Picks Volume 28 contains most of two concert performances from February 26 & 28, 1973. It includes two versions of "They Love Each Other", in its original arrangement, which featured an additional bridge. It also includes two versions of the Johnny Cash song, "Big River", which was played on both nights. Several other songs that were played both nights, but only one version of each is included, namely the February 26 version of "Promised Land" and the February 28 versions of "Beat it On Down the Line", "Mexicali Blues", "El Paso", "Box of Rain", "China Cat Sunflower", "I Know You Rider" & "Row Jimmy". Additional songs from February 26 are missing from the archival tapes.

The album cover continues the postage stamp theme begun with Dick's Picks Volume 26. Liner notes list vocalist/keyboardist Ron "Pigpen" McKernan as one of the band members "in spirit", as he had, at this time, been too ill to play with the band for eight months. He died, age 27, about a week after these concerts, on March 8, 1973.

== Enclosure and article ==
The release includes three sheets of paper stapled together in the middle, yielding a twelve-page enclosure. The front duplicates the cover of the CD and the back is a mostly blank, textured grey that matches the background of the front.

The first two pages inside the front cover contain a collage consisting of a Dead Heads Newsletter and a clipping of a short newspaper article. The next two pages are a photomontage of black-and-white photographs of each of the band's members, and the middle two pages feature a large black-and-white photograph of the band playing on stage. The next two pages contain another photomontage of black-and-white photographs of each of the band's members, and the last two pages list the contents of and credits for the release.

=== Article from the Salt Lake Tribune ===
The article on the third page of the enclosure is from the Salt Lake Tribune, was written by David Proctor on March 1, 1973, and is entitled "Rock show rolls 'em into the aisles". Just five paragraphs long, it is a very positive review of the light show, the warm up band, which was The New Riders of the Purple Sage, and of course the main attraction, the concert by the Grateful Dead.

== Caveat emptor ==
As with all releases in the Dick's Picks series, the notes also contain a "Caveat emptor", this time reading:

Dick's Picks Volume 28 was mastered directly from the original analog 2 track tapes, running at 7.5 ips. Although these 30 year old tapes have held up remarkably well, they may exhibit some very minor effects of the ravages of time. However, we've done all we can to ensure your listening pleasure.

== Track listing ==
=== February 26, 1973 – Pershing Municipal Auditorium, Lincoln, Nebraska ===
Disc 1

First set:

1. "The Promised Land" (Chuck Berry) – 3:36
2. "Loser" (Robert Hunter, Jerry Garcia) – 6:58
3. "Jack Straw" (Hunter, Bob Weir) – 5:17
4. "Don't Ease Me In" (traditional, arr. Grateful Dead) – 4:01
5. "Looks Like Rain" (John Barlow, Weir) – 7:24
6. "Loose Lucy" (Hunter, Garcia) – 7:04
7. "Beer Barrel Polka" (Lew Brown, Wladimir Timm, Jaromir Vejvoda, Vaclav Zeman) – 1:07 (Note: A brief tuning from the February 22, 1973 concert at University of Illinois)
8. "Big Railroad Blues" (Noah Lewis) – 4:00
9. "Playing in the Band" (Hunter, Mickey Hart, Weir) – 17:23

Second set:

10. "They Love Each Other" (Hunter, Garcia) – 5:51
11. "Big River" (Johnny Cash) – 4:36
12. "Tennessee Jed" (Hunter, Garcia) – 8:03

Note

Disc 2

1. "Greatest Story Ever Told" (Hunter, Hart, Weir) – 5:26
2. "Dark Star" > (Hunter, Garcia, Hart, Bill Kreutzmann, Phil Lesh, Pigpen, Weir) – 25:23
3. "Eyes of the World" > (Hunter, Garcia) – 19:09 (Note: Contains a patch from the February 22, 1973 concert at University of Illinois)
4. "Mississippi Half-Step Uptown Toodleloo" (Hunter, Garcia) – 8:00
5. "Me and My Uncle" (John Phillips) – 3:26
6. "Not Fade Away" > (Buddy Holly, Norman Petty) – 6:34
7. "Goin' Down the Road Feelin' Bad" > (trad., arr. Grateful Dead) – 7:52
8. "Not Fade Away" (Holly, Petty) – 3:02

=== February 28, 1973 – Salt Palace, Salt Lake City, Utah ===
Disc 3

First set:

1. "Cold Rain and Snow" (trad., arr. Grateful Dead) – 6:30
2. "Beat it On Down the Line" (Jesse Fuller) – 3:23
3. "They Love Each Other" (Hunter, Garcia) – 5:54
4. "Mexicali Blues" (Barlow, Weir) – 4:03
5. "Sugaree" (Hunter, Garcia) – 8:03
6. "Box of Rain" (Hunter, Lesh) – 5:18
7. "El Paso" (Marty Robbins) – 4:42
8. "He's Gone" (Hunter, Garcia) – 12:06
9. "Jack Straw" (Hunter, Weir) – 4:48

Second set:

1. "China Cat Sunflower" > (Hunter, Garcia) – 7:20
2. "I Know You Rider" (trad., arr. Grateful Dead) – 5:46
3. "Big River" (Cash) – 4:26

Disc 4

1. "Row Jimmy" (Hunter, Garcia) – 8:27
2. "Truckin' " > (Hunter, Garcia, Lesh, Weir) – 12:02
3. "The Other One" > (Kreutzmann, Weir) – 15:07
4. "Eyes of the World" > (Hunter, Garcia) – 17:02
5. "Morning Dew" (Bonnie Dobson, Tim Rose) – 12:40 (Note: Contains a patch from the June 29, 1973 concert in Los Angeles)
6. "Sugar Magnolia" (Hunter, Weir) – 9:11
7. "We Bid You Goodnight" (trad., arr. Grateful Dead) – 3:05

== Personnel ==
=== Grateful Dead ===
- Jerry Garcia – guitar, vocals
- Bob Weir – guitar, vocals
- Phil Lesh – electric bass, vocals
- Donna Godchaux – vocals
- Keith Godchaux – piano
- Bill Kreutzmann – drums
- Pigpen – in spirit

=== Production ===
- Bill Candelario – recording
- Jeffrey Norman – CD mastering
- David Lemieux – tape archivist
- Robert Minkin – cover art and package design
- Brad Temkin – photography
- Rich Weiner – photography
- Ron Sullivan – photography
- Mary Ann Mayer – Deadhead newsletter design
