= Road Trips Full Show: Spectrum 11/5/79 =

Live album by Grateful Dead
- Released: September 10, 2008
- Recorded: November 5, 1979
- Label: Grateful Dead Productions

Grateful Dead chronology
Road Trips Volume 1 Number 1 (2007)	Road Trips Full Show: Spectrum 11/5/79 (2008)	Road Trips Full Show: Spectrum 11/6/79 (2008)

Road Trips Full Show: Spectrum 11/5/79 is a live album by the rock band the Grateful Dead. It contains the complete concert that they performed at the Spectrum, in Philadelphia, Pennsylvania, on November 5, 1979. It was released by Grateful Dead Records on September 10, 2008 as a digital download, in both MP3 and FLAC formats.

Road Trips Full Show: Spectrum 11/5/79 is a continuation of the Digital Downloads series of Grateful Dead albums, and is also a spin-off of the Road Trips series. It was released ten months after Road Trips Volume 1 Number 1, and features a show from the concert tour that was excerpted for that album. It was issued concurrently with a digital download album recorded the following evening, Road Trips Full Show: Spectrum 11/6/79.

== Track listing ==
Disc one

First set:

1. "China Cat Sunflower" > (Garcia, Hunter)
2. "I Know You Rider" (traditional)
3. "Cassidy" (Weir, Barlow)
4. "Friend of the Devil" (Garcia, Dawson, Hunter)
5. "El Paso" (Marty Robbins)
6. "Stagger Lee" (Garcia, Hunter)
7. "Passenger" (Lesh, Monk)
8. "Peggy-O" (traditional)
9. "The Music Never Stopped" (Weir, Barlow)

Disc two

Second set:

1. "Althea" (Garcia, Hunter)
2. "Easy to Love You" (Mydland, Barlow)
3. "Eyes of the World" > (Garcia, Hunter)
4. "Estimated Prophet" > (Weir, Barlow)
5. "Franklin's Tower" > (Garcia, Kreutzmann, Hunter)

Disc three

1. "Jam" > (Grateful Dead)
2. "Drums" > (Grateful Dead)
3. "Space" > (Grateful Dead)
4. "Lost Sailor" > (Weir, Barlow)
5. "Saint of Circumstance" > (Weir, Barlow)
6. "Sugar Magnolia" (Weir, Hunter)

Encore:

7. "Casey Jones" (Garcia, Hunter)

== Personnel ==
- Jerry Garcia – lead guitar, vocals
- Mickey Hart – drums
- Bill Kreutzmann – drums
- Phil Lesh – electric bass
- Brent Mydland – keyboards, vocals
- Bob Weir – rhythm guitar, vocals
