= Dave's Picks Volume 47 =

Live album by Grateful Dead
- Released: July 28, 2023
- Recorded: December 9, 1979
- Venue: Kiel Auditorium, St. Louis
- Genre: Rock
- Length: 219:24
- Label: Rhino
- Producer: Grateful Dead; David Lemieux

Grateful Dead chronology
RFK Stadium, Washington, D.C. 6/10/73 (2023)	Dave's Picks Volume 47 (2023)	Wake of the Flood: The Angel's Share (2023)

Dave's Picks Volume 47 is a three-CD live album by the rock band the Grateful Dead. It contains the complete concert recorded on December 9, 1979, at Kiel Auditorium in St. Louis, Missouri. It was released on July 28, 2023, in a limited edition of 25,000 copies.

The concert was recorded early in the tenure of Brent Mydland as the Grateful Dead's keyboard player. It includes several songs from the album Go to Heaven, which was released about four months after the St. Louis show.

Dave's Picks Volume 47 also includes bonus tracks comprising the last part of the second set and the encore from the band's December 4, 1979 concert at the Uptown Theatre in Chicago, Illinois. Several other songs from the second set of that performance were included as bonus tracks on Dave's Picks Volume 31.

== Critical reception ==
AllMusic said, "Dave's Picks, Vol. 47 finds the Grateful Dead closing out their epic late-'70s period and cementing the Brent Mydland era that would define much of their early-'80s sound. Having replaced outgoing pair Keith and Donna Godchaux in early 1979, Mydland quickly made his mark in the band not only as their keyboardist and backup singer but also as a songwriter with a funky soft-rock touch and smoky high-tenor voice.... It's yet another win from this seemingly bottomless series of excellent Dead bootlegs-made-official."

== Track listing ==
Disc 1

First set:

1. "Alabama Getaway" > (Jerry Garcia, Robert Hunter) – 7:04
2. "Promised Land" (Chuck Berry) – 4:36
3. "Brown-Eyed Women" (Garcia, Hunter) – 5:55
4. "Cassidy" (Bob Weir, John Perry Barlow) – 5:32
5. "Row Jimmy" (Garcia, Hunter) – 12:33
6. "New Minglewood Blues" (traditional, arranged by Grateful Dead) – 7:00
7. "Candyman" (Garcia, Hunter) – 8:01
8. "Lazy Lightning" > (Weir, Barlow) – 3:34
9. "Supplication" (Weir, Barlow) – 5:53
10. "Deal" (Garcia, Hunter) – 5:50

Disc 2

Second set:

1. "Shakedown Street" > (Garcia, Hunter) – 14:22
2. "Samson and Delilah" (traditional, arranged by Grateful Dead) – 8:05
3. "High Time" (Garcia, Hunter) – 7:54
4. "Easy to Love You" (Brent Mydland, Barlow) – 4:05
5. "Terrapin Station" > (Garcia, Hunter) – 14:41
6. "Lost Sailor" > (Weir, Barlow) – 6:47
7. "Saint of Circumstance" > (Weir, Barlow) – 5:33
8. "Jam" > (Grateful Dead) – 7:51
9. "Drums" (Mickey Hart, Bill Kreutzmann) – 5:30

Disc 3

Second set, continued:

1. "Space" > (Garcia, Phil Lesh, Weir) – 7:42
2. "Black Peter" > (Garcia, Hunter) – 11:43
3. "I Need a Miracle" > (Weir, Barlow) – 4:19
4. "Bertha" > (Garcia, Hunter) – 6:08
5. "Good Lovin'" (Rudy Clark, Arthur Resnick) – 8:28

Encore:

6. "Don’t Ease Me In" (traditional, arranged by Grateful Dead) – 3:47

Bonus tracks – December 4, 1979 – Uptown Theatre, Chicago:

7. "Space" > (Garcia, Lesh, Weir) – 7:42
8. "Not Fade Away" > (Norman Petty, Charles Hardin) – 9:57
9. "Stella Blue" > (Garcia, Hunter) – 9:01
10. "Sugar Magnolia" (Weir, Hunter) – 9:07
11. "U.S. Blues" (Garcia, Hunter) – 5:37

== Personnel ==
Grateful Dead

- Jerry Garcia – guitar, vocals
- Bob Weir – guitar, vocals
- Brent Mydland – keyboards, vocals
- Phil Lesh – bass
- Bill Kreutzmann – drums
- Mickey Hart – drums

Production

- Produced by Grateful Dead
- Produced for release by David Lemieux
- Executive producer: Mark Pinkus
- Associate producers: Doran Tyson, Ivette Ramos
- Mastering: Jeffrey Norman
- Recording: Dan Healy
- Art direction, design: Steve Vance
- Cover art: John Vogl
- Liner notes essay: David Lemieux

== Charts ==
Chart performance for Dave's Picks Volume 47
Chart (2023)	Peak position
US Billboard 200	27
US Top Rock Albums (Billboard)	3
