= Fillmore Auditorium, San Francisco, CA, July 3, 1966 =

Live album by Grateful Dead
- Released: July 3, 2026
- Recorded: July 3, 1966
- Venue: Fillmore Auditorium
- Genre: Rock
- Length: 91:41
- Label: Rhino

Grateful Dead chronology
Dave's Picks Volume 58 (2026)	Fillmore Auditorium, San Francisco, CA, July 3, 1966 (2026)	Dave's Picks Volume 59 (2026)

Singles from Fillmore Auditorium, San Francisco, CA, July 3, 1966
- 1. "Cold Rain and Snow" Released: May 20, 2026; 2. "Viola Lee Blues" Released: June 11, 2026; 3. "Cream Puff War" Released: July 1, 2026

Fillmore Auditorium, San Francisco, CA, July 3, 1966 is a live album by the rock band the Grateful Dead. As the title suggests, it was recorded at the Fillmore Auditorium in San Francisco on July 3, 1966. It was released as a two-disc CD and as a three-disc LP on July 3, 2026. On the vinyl version, five of the record sides contain music; the sixth side is an etching.

This is one of the earliest live recordings of the Grateful Dead. It was previously released in 2015 as part of the box set 30 Trips Around the Sun. Two of the tracks ("Don't Mess Up a Good Thing" and "Gangster of Love") had previously appeared on the 2005 album Rare Cuts and Oddities 1966.

== Independence Ball ==
On Friday, Saturday, and Sunday night, July 1, 2, and 3, 1966, Bill Graham promoted a series of concerts called "The Independence Ball" at the Fillmore Auditorium in San Francisco. The first night featured Quicksilver Messenger Service, Big Brother and the Holding Company (with Janis Joplin), and the Jaywalkers. Performing on the second night were the Great Society, Sopwith Camel, and the Charlatans. The bands that played on the final night were Love and the Grateful Dead. The artwork for the poster and handbill for the event was created by Wes Wilson.

The Dead's performance was recorded by their audio engineer, Owsley "Bear" Stanley.

== Critical reception ==
On AllMusic, Fred Thomas said, "Even in this germinal phase, the Grateful Dead are still a force to contend with on 7/3/66, exhibiting an early look at the group interplay, improvisational curiosity, and dynamic approach to live performance that would only evolve from there.... The snapshot of the Grateful Dead... is one of a work in progress, the band loose and scruffy as they run through their repertoire, and especially raw sound quality enhancing that scruffiness."

In Spectrum Culture, J Simpson wrote, "In many respects, this is the Dead just starting out.... It's a rare glimpse of the Dead in an embryonic state, when it was assumed that Pigpen, rather than Jerry Garcia, would become the de facto leader of this very talented, albeit a bit strange, R&B / electric jug band.... For all its anomalies, the Dead sound remarkably fully formed and self-actualized this early in the game."

== Track listing ==
Disc 1

1. "Nobody's Fault But Mine" (traditional, arranged by Grateful Dead) – 1:09
2. "Dancing in the Street" (William Stevenson, Marvin Gaye, Ivy Jo Hunter) – 7:59
3. "I Know You Rider" (traditional, arranged by Grateful Dead) – 3:05
4. "He Was a Friend of Mine" (traditional, arranged by Grateful Dead) – 4:16
5. "Next Time You See Me" (Bill Harvey, Earl Forest) – 3:32
6. "Viola Lee Blues" (Noah Lewis) – 7:39
7. "Big Boss Man" (Al Smith, Luther Dixon) – 3:49
8. "Sittin' on Top of the World" (Lonnie Carter, Walter Jacobs) – 2:21
9. "Keep Rolling By" (traditional, arranged by Grateful Dead) – 4:35

Disc 2

1. "New, New Minglewood Blues" (Jerry Garcia, Bob Weir, Ron McKernan, Phil Lesh, Bill Kreutzmann) – 3:54
2. "Cold Rain and Snow" (traditional, arranged by Grateful Dead) – 3:16
3. "Tastebud" (McKernan) – 6:37
4. "Beat It On Down the Line" (Jesse Fuller) – 2:48
5. "Cream Puff War" (Garcia) – 5:18
6. "Don't Mess Up a Good Thing" (Oliver Sain) – 3:14
7. "The Monster (Cardboard Cowboy)" (Lesh) – 2:31
8. "Gangster of Love" (John Watson) – 5:10
9. "You Don't Have to Ask" (Garcia, Weir, McKernan, Lesh, Kreutzmann) – 4:32
10. "In the Midnight Hour" (Wilson Pickett, Steve Cropper) – 15:50

== Personnel ==
Grateful Dead

- Jerry Garcia – guitar, vocals
- Bob Weir – guitar, vocals
- Ron "Pigpen" McKernan – organ, harmonica, vocals
- Phil Lesh – bass vocals
- Bill Kreutzmann – drums

Production

- Produced for release by David Lemieux
- Executive producer: Mark Pinkus
- Associate producer: Ivette Ramos
- Recording: Owsley Stanley
- Mastering: Jeffrey Norman
- Art origination and package design: Darryl Norsen
- Photography: Herb Greene
- Liner notes essay: Jesse Jarnow
