= Althea (song) =

Song by the Grateful Dead

from the album Go to Heaven
- Released: April 28, 1980
- Genre: Rock; soft rock; funk rock
- Length: 6:51
- Label: Arista
- Songwriters: Jerry Garcia; Robert Hunter
- Producer: Gary Lyons

"Althea" is a song by the Grateful Dead, with lyrics written by Robert Hunter and music by Jerry Garcia. It first appeared as the third track on the band's 1980 studio album Go to Heaven. Along with "Alabama Getaway", it is one of only two Garcia–Hunter compositions on the album.

The song was first performed live on August 4, 1979, at the Oakland Civic Auditorium in Oakland, California. "Althea" would hold a steady place in the band's repertoire, being played consistently from its debut to the band's final days in 1995, with its final performance occurring at the band's penultimate show on July 8, 1995, at Soldier Field in Chicago, Illinois.

The song was performed over 270 times by the Grateful Dead. "Althea" has been performed by several Grateful Dead offshoots, including Dead & Company, RatDog, and Phil Lesh and Friends.

== Background ==
Several lines in the song reference William Shakespeare's tragedy Hamlet. Namely, the lines, "You may be a clown in the burying ground", "You may be the fate of Ophelia", and "Perchance to dream". The latter phrase is famously featured in the "To be, or not to be" soliloquy spoken by Hamlet in the tragedy's third act.

In a 2015 interview with Rolling Stone, Hunter was asked by David Browne if "Althea" was written about Garcia, to which Hunter promptly answered that it was not. When asked further about certain lines in the song that seem to reference Garcia's worsening drug usage — like "ain't nobody messing with you but you / but your friends are getting most concerned" — Hunter replied,

You know, people think I have a lot more intention at what I do because it sounds very focused and intentional. Sometimes I just write the next line that occurs to me, and then I stand back and look at it and say, "This looks like it works." But that does kind of sound like a message to him. There were other people messing with him.

== Critical reception ==
In a song review for AllMusic, Lindsay Planer wrote,

This slightly skewed love song is arguably the best Jerry Garcia/Robert Hunter collaboration on Go to Heaven.... The studio version doesn't display the subtleties of the Dead's instrumental interaction as keenly as live renditions — such as the one on the two-CD set Go to Nassau. However, Garcia incorporates mini guitar solos as a counterbalance eventually expanded between the verses. Brent Mydland — who joined the Dead just prior to Go to Heaven — would also weave some bright and lyrical lines behind Garcia's lead.

In a Rolling Stone list of Jerry Garcia's fifty greatest songs, "Althea" came in twentieth, with the description reading,

By the beginning of the Eighties, Garcia and Hunter weren't writing together as much as they once had, but when they did collaborate, they could still summon up the old magic. The slow, lovely "Althea" stands out on 1980's lackluster Go to Heaven...

Stereogum rated "Althea" as one of the Grateful Dead's best songs, saying "the studio version of 'Althea,' found on the underrated Go to Heaven album, captures the band at its swampiest."

== Legacy ==
"Althea" was a key contributing factor to the formation of Dead & Company. Guitarist John Mayer first heard the song in 2011 on Pandora and became infatuated with the Grateful Dead. While guest hosting The Late Late Show in 2015, Mayer invited former Grateful Dead guitarist Bob Weir to appear on the show as a musical guest. The two performed "Althea", and Mayer was invited to join Dead & Company shortly thereafter.

=== Cover versions ===
Reggae band Culture covered "Althea" on the 1997 compilation album Fire on the Mountain: Reggae Celebrates the Grateful Dead, Volume 2.

The song was covered on the 2016 compilation album Day of the Dead by Winston Marshall, Kodiak Blue, and Shura.

Cheval Sombre covered the song in 2021 on his EP Althea.

"Althea" was covered on Jaime Wyatt's 2023 album Feel Good, featuring Black Pumas guitarist Adrian Quesada.

== Officially released live recordings by date ==
- Enjoying the Ride – August 12, 1979
- Road Trips Volume 1 Number 1 Bonus Disc – October 31, 1979
- Road Trips Full Show: Spectrum 11/5/79 – November 5, 1979
- Dave's Picks Volume 31 – December 3, 1979
- Road Trips Volume 3 Number 4 – May 6, 1980
- Go to Nassau – May 16, 1980
- Enjoying the Ride – August 23, 1980
- Grateful Dead Download Series Volume 7 – September 3, 1980
- Beyond Description (1973–1989) – October 23, 1980
- Madison Square Garden, New York, NY 3/9/81 – March 9, 1981
- In and Out of the Garden: Madison Square Garden '81, '82, '83 – March 9, 1981
- The Music Never Stopped – March 14, 1981
- Enjoying the Ride – March 14, 1981
- Dave's Picks Volume 56 – March 20, 1981
- Dave's Picks Volume 56 – March 21, 1981
- Enjoying the Ride – May 1, 1981
- 30 Trips Around the Sun – May 16, 1981
- Road Trips Volume 4 Number 4 – April 5, 1982
- Dick's Picks Volume 32 – August 7, 1982
- Dave's Picks Volume 52 – September 11, 1983
- Dick's Picks Volume 6 – October 14, 1983
- Enjoying the Ride – December 27, 1989
- Without a Net – March 15, 1990
- Terrapin Station (Limited Edition) – March 15, 1990
- Spring 1990 (The Other One) – April 1, 1990
- Dave's Picks Volume 40 – July 19, 1990
- Dave's Picks Volume 55 – October 28, 1990
- Enjoying the Ride – May 12, 1991
- 30 Trips Around the Sun: The Definitive Live Story 1965–1995 – March 20, 1992
- 30 Trips Around the Sun – March 20, 1992
- 30 Trips Around the Sun – October 1, 1994

== Personnel ==
- Jerry Garcia – guitar, vocals
- Mickey Hart – percussion
- Bill Kreutzmann – drums
- Phil Lesh – bass
- Brent Mydland – keyboards
- Bob Weir – guitar
