= Dave's Picks Volume 56 =

Live album by the rock band Grateful Dead

Live album by Grateful Dead
- Released: October 31, 2025
- Recorded: March 20 – 21, 1981
- Venue: Rainbow Theatre
- Genre: Rock
- Length: 317:54
- Label: Rhino
- Producer: Grateful Dead

Grateful Dead chronology
Blues for Allah: The Angel's Share (2025)	Dave's Picks Volume 56 (2025)	Dave's Picks Volume 57 (2026)

Dave's Picks Volume 56 is a four-CD live album by the rock band the Grateful Dead. It was recorded on March 20 and 21, 1981, at the Rainbow Theatre in London, England. It was released on October 31, 2025, in a limited edition of 25,000 copies.

The album contains two nearly complete concerts. The encore of the first show, "U.S. Blues", is not included. Additionally, "Drums" and "Space" from both nights have been shortened by a few minutes.

In March 1981 the Grateful Dead played five concerts in Europe. Four were at the Rainbow Theatre, on March 20, 21, 23, and 24. The fifth, on March 28, was at Grugahalle, in Essen, West Germany, on the same bill as the Who.

Volume 56 was the second Dave's Picks in a row that was recorded in Europe.

== Critical reception ==
On AllMusic, Timothy Monger wrote, "These were the Dead's first shows in Europe since the arrival of keyboardist Brent Mydland and his nimble solos and aching tenor vocals are a fixture of these sets. The rest of the band sounds energetic... Overall, there is a ton of music here, showcasing another classic Dead era as they established their '80s sound."

== Track listing ==
Disc 1

March 20, 1981 – first set:

1. "Feel Like a Stranger" (Bob Weir, John Perry Barlow) – 7:31
2. "Friend of the Devil" (Jerry Garcia, Robert Hunter, John Dawson) – 9:27
3. "C.C. Rider" (traditional, arranged by Grateful Dead) – 7:36
4. "Althea" (Garcia, Hunter) – 8:47
5. "Mama Tried" (Merle Haggard) – 2:30
6. "Mexicali Blues" (Weir, Barlow) – 4:54
7. "Loser" (Garcia, Hunter) – 8:15
8. "New Minglewood Blues" (traditional, arranged by Grateful Dead) – 7:14
9. "Candyman" (Garcia, Hunter) – 7:18
10. "Looks Like Rain" (Weir, Barlow) – 7:59
11. "Deal" (Garcia, Hunter) – 8:23

Disc 2

March 20, 1981 – second set:

1. "Scarlet Begonias" (Garcia, Hunter) – 10:37
2. "Fire on the Mountain" (Mickey Hart, Hunter) – 10:37
3. "Lost Sailor" (Weir, Barlow) – 6:05
4. "Saint of Circumstance" (Weir, Barlow) – 6:48
5. "He's Gone" (Garcia, Hunter) – 12:27
6. "Drums" (Hart, Bill Kreutzmann) – 2:31
7. "Space" (Garcia, Phil Lesh, Weir) – 2:25
8. "Truckin'" (Garcia, Lesh, Weir, Hunter) – 9:33
9. "Wharf Rat" (Garcia, Hunter) – 8:23
10. "Around and Around" (Chuck Berry) – 4:26
11. "Johnny B. Goode" (Berry) – 4:07

Disc 3

March 21, 1981 – first set:

1. "Alabama Getaway" (Garcia, Hunter) – 5:32
2. "Promised Land" (Berry) – 4:25
3. "Peggy-O" (traditional, arranged by Grateful Dead) – 7:04
4. "Me and My Uncle" (John Phillips) – 2:57
5. "Big River" (Johnny Cash) – 5:36
6. "Tennessee Jed" (Garcia, Hunter) – 8:29
7. "Little Red Rooster" (Willie Dixon) – 8:52
8. "Althea" (Garcia, Hunter) – 9:50
9. "Let It Grow" (Weir, Barlow) – 12:49
10. "China Cat Sunflower" (Garcia, Hunter) – 6:22
11. "I Know You Rider" (traditional, arranged by Grateful Dead) – 7:56

Disc 4

March 21, 1981 – second set:

1. "Jack Straw" (Weir, Hunter) – 6:04
2. "Ship of Fools" (Garcia, Hunter) – 8:50
3. "Estimated Prophet" (Weir, Barlow) – 11:46
4. "Eyes of the World" (Garcia, Hunter) – 12:59
5. "Drums" (Hart, Kreutzmann) – 5:49
6. "Space" (Garcia, Lesh, Weir) – 5:35
7. "Not Fade Away" (Norman Petty, Charles Hardin) – 10:47
8. "Black Peter" (Garcia, Hunter) – 9:06
9. "One More Saturday Night" (Weir) – 4:56

March 21, 1981 – encore:

10. "Don't Ease Me In" (traditional, arranged by Grateful Dead) – 3:07

== Personnel ==
Grateful Dead

- Jerry Garcia – guitar, vocals
- Mickey Hart – drums
- Bill Kreutzmann – drums
- Phil Lesh – bass
- Brent Mydland – keyboards, vocals
- Bob Weir – guitar, vocals

Production

- Produced by Grateful Dead
- Produced for release by David Lemieux
- Executive producer: Mark Pinkus
- Associate producer: Ivette Ramos
- Recording: Dan Healy
- Mastering: Jeffrey Norman
- Art direction, design: Steve Vance
- Cover art: James Mazza
- Photos: Mark Lancer, David Corio
- Liner notes: David Lemieux

== Charts ==
Chart performance for Dave's Picks Volume 56
Chart (2025)	Peak position
US Billboard 200	25
US Top Rock & Alternative Albums (Billboard)	6
