= Dave's Picks Volume 57 =

Live album by Grateful Dead
- Released: January 30, 2026
- Recorded: February 1, 1978
- Venue: Uptown Theatre
- Genre: Rock
- Length: 232:37
- Label: Rhino

Grateful Dead chronology
| Dave's Picks Volume 56 (2025) | Dave's Picks Volume 57 (2026) | Boston Music Hall, Boston, MA 6/11/76 (2026) |

Dave's Picks Volume 57 is a three-CD live album by the American rock band the Grateful Dead. It contains the complete show recorded at the Uptown Theatre in Chicago on February 1, 1978. It also includes the final song from the first set and most of the second set from the previous night's concert. It was released on January 30, 2026, in a limited edition of 25,000 copies.

Dave's Picks is a series of archival live albums compiled by David Lemieux. Volume 57 is the first of four Dave's Picks planned for 2026, all with cover art by Chelsea Housand.

The Uptown Theatre, originally a movie palace, opened in 1925. From 1978 to 1981, the Grateful Dead played 17 shows at the Uptown. The January 30, January 31, and February 1, 1978 shows comprised the band's first concert run at the venue.

== Critical reception ==
In Glide Magazine, Doug Collette wrote, "... apart from the fleeting brilliance in the extended segue [of "The Other One", "Wharf Rat", and "Sugar Magnolia"] that closes 2/1/78, most of what's on the first two discs is dangerously close to pedestrian... [But the] roughly eighty minutes [of bonus tracks from January 31]... is an altogether remarkable string of playing."

== Track listing ==
Disc 1

February 1, 1978 - first set:

1. "Jack Straw" (Bob Weir, Robert Hunter) – 6:44
2. "Friend of the Devil" (Jerry Garcia, John Dawson, Hunter) – 8:45
3. "Mama Tried" (Merle Haggard) – 2:35
4. "Me and My Uncle" (John Phillips) – 3:53
5. "Ramble On Rose" (Garcia, Hunter) – 8:09
6. "Cassidy" (Weir, John Perry Barlow) – 5:32
7. "Sunrise" (Donna Jean Godchaux) – 3:50
8. "Sugaree" (Garcia, Hunter) – 10:45

February 1, 1978 - second set:

9. "Samson and Delilah" (traditional, arranged by Weir) – 8:42

February 1, 1978 - encore:

10. "Around and Around" (Chuck Berry) – 8:08

Bonus track – January 31, 1978:

11. "Let It Grow" (Weir, Barlow) – 12:40

Disc 2

February 1, 1978 - second set, continued:

1. "It Must Have Been the Roses" (Hunter) – 8:24
2. "Estimated Prophet" (Weir, Barlow) – 11:50
3. "He's Gone" (Garcia, Hunter) – 10:24
4. "Drums" (Mickey Hart, Bill Kreutzmann) – 5:40
5. "Jam" (Grateful Dead) – 8:04
6. "The Other One" (Weir, Kreutzmann) – 10:15
7. "Wharf Rat" (Garcia, Hunter) – 9:15
8. "Sugar Magnolia" (Weir, Hunter) – 9:47

Disc 3

Bonus tracks – January 31, 1978:

1. "Scarlet Begonias" (Garcia, Hunter) – 11:47
2. "Fire on the Mountain" (Hart, Hunter) – 10:35
3. "Terrapin Station" (Garcia, Hunter) – 10:16
4. "Playing in the Band" (Weir, Hart, Hunter) – 9:21
5. "Drums" (Hart, Kreutzmann) – 3:27
6. "Space" (Garcia, Phil Lesh, Weir) – 6:00
7. "Black Peter" (Garcia, Hunter) – 12:54
8. "Truckin'" (Garcia, Lesh, Weir, Hunter) – 8:44
9. "Good Lovin'" (Rudy Clark, Arthur Resnick) – 6:03

== Personnel ==
Grateful Dead

- Jerry Garcia – guitar, vocals
- Bob Weir – guitar, vocals
- Phil Lesh – bass, vocals
- Bill Kreutzmann – drums
- Mickey Hart – drums
- Keith Godchaux – keyboards
- Donna Jean Godchaux – vocals

Production

- Produced by Grateful Dead
- Produced for release by David Lemieux
- Executive producer – Mark Pinkus
- Associate producer – Ivette Ramos
- Mastering – Jeffrey Norman
- Recording – Betty Cantor-Jackson
- Art direction, design – Steve Vance
- Cover art – Chelsea Housand
- Photos – Bruce Polonsky, Kirk West
- Liner notes essay – David Lemieux
