= Dave's Picks Volume 31 =

Live album by Grateful Dead
- Released: July 26, 2019
- Recorded: December 3, 1979
- Venue: Uptown Theatre; Chicago
- Genre: Rock
- Length: 217:24
- Label: Rhino (R2-573509)
- Producer: Grateful Dead

Grateful Dead chronology
Fillmore West 1969: February 28th (2019)	Dave's Picks Volume 31 (2019)	Giants Stadium 1987, 1989, 1991 (2019)

Dave's Picks Volume 31 is a three-CD live album by the rock band the Grateful Dead. It contains the complete concert recorded on December 3, 1979 at the Uptown Theatre in Chicago, Illinois. It was released on July 26, 2019, in a limited edition of 20,000 numbered copies.

Dave's Picks Volume 31 also includes three songs performed at the same venue the following night. Additional tracks from the December 4 Uptown Theatre show can be found on Dave's Picks Volume 47.

== Uptown Theatre ==
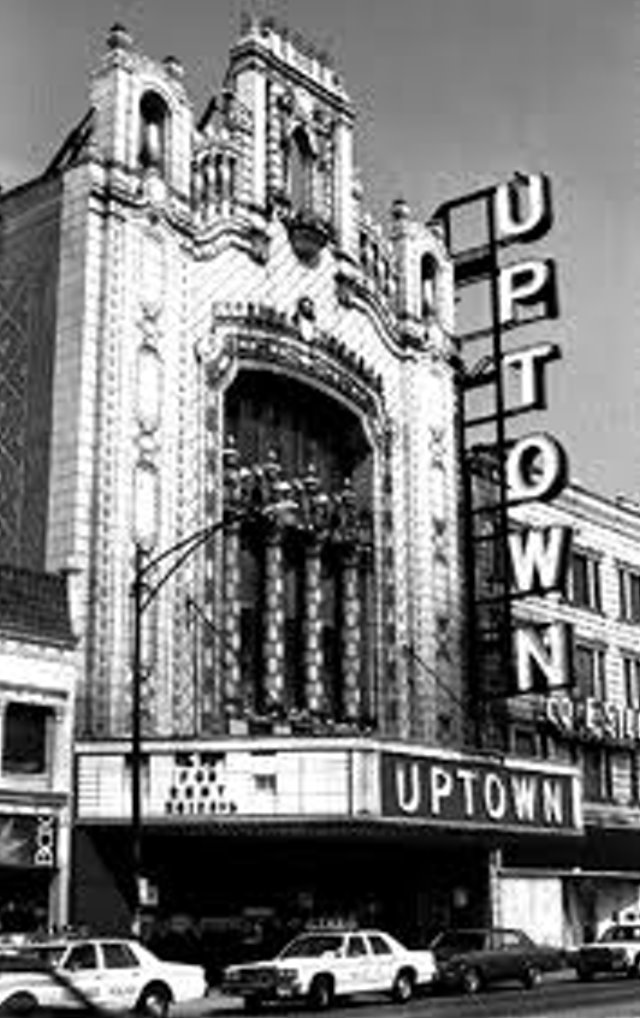
Uptown Theatre in Chicago, ca. late 1970s

The Uptown Theatre is a large, very ornate theater that was built in 1925 and was originally used for showing silent movies. It seats about 4,400 people. From January 1978 to February 1981 the Grateful Dead played there 17 times. Still standing, the theater has been closed since 1981.

== Critical reception ==
On AllMusic, Timothy Monger said, "Plucked from a Chicago run at the end of 1979, Dave's Picks, Vol. 31 features a jaunty trio of sets from the Grateful Dead, who were at the point still in the honeymoon phase with their newest recruit, keyboardist Brent Mydland."

In Glide Magazine, Doug Collette wrote, "In front of close to forty-five hundred attendees, the Grateful Dead were opening a three-night run... and proceeded to blend together tried-and-true material like "Brown-Eyed Women" and "Wharf Rat" with fairly new compositions such as "Alabama Getaway", "Althea" and "Fire On The Mountain"."

== Track listing ==
Disc 1

First set:

1. "Alabama Getaway" > (Jerry Garcia, Robert Hunter) – 7:05
2. "Promised Land" (Chuck Berry) – 4:35
3. "Brown-Eyed Women" (Garcia, Hunter) – 5:48
4. "El Paso" (Marty Robbins) – 4:26
5. "Ramble On Rose" (Garcia, Hunter) – 7:44
6. "It's All Over Now" (Bobby Womack, Shirley Womack) – 8:58
7. "Jack-a-Roe" (traditional, arranged by Grateful Dead) – 5:39
8. "Lazy Lightning" > (Bob Weir, John Perry Barlow) – 3:16
9. "Supplication" (Weir, Barlow) – 5:25
10. "Althea" (Garcia, Hunter) – 11:33
11. "The Music Never Stopped" (Weir, Barlow) – 8:17

Disc 2

Second set:

1. "Scarlet Begonias" > (Garcia, Hunter) – 11:42
2. "Fire on the Mountain" (Mickey Hart, Hunter) – 15:28
3. "Samson and Delilah" (traditional, arranged by Grateful Dead) – 7:45
4. "Terrapin Station" > (Garcia, Hunter) – 14:11
5. "Playing in the Band" > (Weir, Hart, Hunter) – 11:20
6. "Drums" (Hart, Bill Kreutzmann) – 10:02

Disc 3

1. "Space" > (Garcia, Phil Lesh, Weir) – 2:27
2. "Lost Sailor" > (Weir, Barlow) – 7:06
3. "Saint of Circumstance" > (Weir, Barlow) – 6:11
4. "Wharf Rat" > (Garcia, Hunter) – 11:05
5. "Truckin'" (Garcia, Lesh, Weir, Hunter) – 9:33

Encore:

6. "Johnny B. Goode" (Berry) – 4:49

Uptown Theatre – December 4, 1979:

7. "Estimated Prophet" > (Weir, Barlow) – 12:01
8. "Franklin's Tower" > (Garcia, Kreutzmann, Hunter) – 10:12
9. "Jam" (Grateful Dead) – 10:27

== Personnel ==
Grateful Dead

- Jerry Garcia – guitar, vocals
- Mickey Hart – drums
- Bill Kreutzmann – drums
- Phil Lesh – bass
- Brent Mydland – keyboards, vocals
- Bob Weir – guitar, vocals

Production

- Produced by Grateful Dead
- Produced for release by David Lemieux
- Associate Producers: Ivette Ramos & Doran Tyson
- Recording: Dan Healy
- Mastering: David Glasser
- Art direction, design: Steve Vance
- Cover art: Tyler Crook
- Photos: Jay Blakesberg, Kirk West
- Liner notes essay "A Little Bolt of Inspiration": David Lemieux
