= Dick's Picks Volume 27 =

Live album by Grateful Dead
- Released: January 17, 2003
- Recorded: December 16, 1992
- Genres: Jam; Folk rock Psychedelic rock
- Length: 196:21
- Label: Grateful Dead Records

Grateful Dead chronology
Go to Nassau (2002)	Dick's Picks Volume 27 (2003)	Birth of the Dead (2003)

Professional ratings
Review scores
Source	Rating
Allmusic	4/5 stars
The Music Box	3.5/5 stars
Rolling Stone	3/5 stars

Dick's Picks Volume 27 is an album by the Grateful Dead, the 27th installment of their archival release series. It was recorded on December 16, 1992 at the Oakland Coliseum Arena, in Oakland, California. It was released in 2003.

Dick's Picks Volume 27 also contains four bonus songs recorded at the December 17, 1992 concert at the Oakland Coliseum. These include the encore, the only officially released version of the medley "Baba O'Riley" and "Tomorrow Never Knows".

== Enclosure ==
Included in the release is a single sheet of paper, printed on both sides and folded into thirds, yielding a six-page enclosure. The front duplicates the disc's cover, and the back is a mostly blank, textured grey that matches the background of the front.

The first page inside lists the contents of and credits for the release. The next two pages inside contain a large color photo of the band on stage along with copyright information. The fourth inside page features some fan art that adorns the front and back of an envelope sent to "Grateful Dead ticket sales - Oakland", along with two tickets for the show. The background of all of these pages is the same textured grey that appears on the cover.

== Caveat emptor ==
Each volume of Dick's Picks has its own "caveat emptor" label, advising the listener of the sound quality of the recording. The one for Volume 27 reads:

"Dick's Picks Vol. 27 was mastered directly from the original stereo soundboard digital audio tapes, and was not recorded with the intent of producing a commercial release. It may, therefore, contain some very minor anomalies, although everything in our power has been done to make it just exactly perfect."

== Track listing ==
Disc one

First set:

1. "Feel Like a Stranger" (John Barlow, Bob Weir) – 9:20
2. "Brown-Eyed Women" (Robert Hunter, Jerry Garcia) – 5:22
3. "The Same Thing" (Willie Dixon) – 8:09
4. "Loose Lucy" (Hunter, Garcia) – 7:21
5. "Stuck Inside of Mobile with the Memphis Blues Again" (Bob Dylan) – 9:18
6. "Row Jimmy" (Hunter, Garcia) – 10:10
7. "Let it Grow" (Barlow, Weir) – 13:05

Disc two

Second set:

1. "Shakedown Street" (Hunter, Garcia) – 12:59
2. "Samson and Delilah" (traditional, arranged by Weir) – 7:28
3. "Ship of Fools" (Hunter, Garcia) – 7:39
4. "Playing in the Band" (Hunter, Mickey Hart, Weir) – 12:33 →
5. "Drums" (Hart, Bill Kreutzmann) – 14:41 →
6. "Space" (Garcia, Phil Lesh, Weir) – 10:56 →

Disc three

Second set, continued:

1. "Dark Star" (Hunter, Garcia, Hart, Kreutzmann, Lesh, Pigpen, Weir) – 8:56 →
2. "All Along the Watchtower" (Dylan) – 6:38 →
3. "Stella Blue" (Hunter, Garcia) – 8:43 →
4. "Good Lovin' " (Artie Resnick, Rudy Clark) – 8:30

Encore:

5. "Casey Jones" (Hunter, Garcia) – 5:38

Bonus tracks — December 17, 1992:

6. "Throwing Stones" (Barlow, Weir) – 9:43 →
7. "Not Fade Away" (Buddy Holly, Norman Petty) – 10:58
8. "Baba O'Riley" (Pete Townshend) – 3:28 →
9. "Tomorrow Never Knows" (John Lennon, Paul McCartney) – 4:46

== Personnel ==
=== Grateful Dead ===
- Jerry Garcia – guitar, vocals
- Bob Weir – guitar, vocals
- Phil Lesh – electric bass, vocals
- Vince Welnick – keyboards, vocals
- Mickey Hart – drums, percussion
- Bill Kreutzmann – drums, percussion

=== Production ===
- Dan Healy – recording
- David Lemieux – tape archivist
- Eileen Law – archival research
- Jeffrey Norman – CD mastering
- Robert Minkin – design & layout
- Ken Friedman – photography
