= Dick's Picks Volume 29 =

Live album by Grateful Dead
- Released: July 22, 2003
- Recorded: May 19 and 21, 1977
- Length: 420:26
- Label: Grateful Dead Records

Grateful Dead chronology
Dick's Picks Volume 28 (2003)	Dick's Picks Volume 29 (2003)	The Very Best of Grateful Dead (2003)

Professional ratings
Review scores
Source	Rating
Allmusic	4.5/5 stars
The Music Box	5/5 stars

Dick's Picks Volume 29 is an album by the rock band the Grateful Dead. The 29th installment of the "Dick's Picks" archival series, it was recorded May 19, 1977, at the Fox Theatre in Atlanta, Georgia, and May 21, 1977, at the Lakeland Civic Center in Lakeland, Florida. The six-CD release is the longest album in the series and the only one with more than four CDs.

The album contains all of both concerts, except for the encore of the Florida show ("U.S. Blues"). Also included are five unlisted bonus tracks, recorded October 11, 1977 at the Lloyd Noble Center in Norman, Oklahoma. Additional material from this concert later appeared on Road Trips Volume 1 Number 2.

== Enclosures ==
This release is a boxed set containing two CD cases, one for each show. Each case contains a single sheet folded into thirds, yielding two six-page enclosures. The front of each enclosure matches the cover on its case, and the back of each is a mostly blank, textured grey that matches the background of the front. The last page of each enclosure lists the contents of and credits for the release.

=== Liner notes for the May 19, 1977 show ===
The three pages inside the enclosure for the May 19th show feature one page of liner notes followed by a color photograph of the band on stage spanning the other two pages. Accompanying the liner notes is a small black-and-white photograph of the Fox Theater's marquee which states "Grateful Dead" and "Latvala!"

The liner notes have no title and consist of five paragraphs written by Michael M. Getz, "co-author of The Deadhead's Taping Compendium Vols. 1-4." He writes that "it's understandably a rare show when the Dead do deliver stellar song renditions from start to finish," and that "May 19, 1977 is such a show." The author goes on to claim that this "inspirational shift comes from" their rendition of "Sugaree" that night, which he asserts is "the best song ever to turn on friends to the Dead with. It's the perfect microcosm of what they're really up to."

In the last paragraph Getz describes the final sequence of songs, bookended by versions of "Playing in the Band", in glowing terms: "a spice-induced, pre-Matrix scent reeking of flavorful foreboding despite the underlying slow motion rhythm battles with Agent Smith." Michael closes his piece by describing the end of the show, writing "the Grateful Dead gallop triumphantly into one of the most majestic set-ending climaxes of their career."

=== Newspaper clipping for the May 21, 1977 show ===
The three pages inside the enclosure for the May 21st show feature a newspaper clipping of an article entitled "Grateful for a phenomenal concert by 'Dead'." It is by Leslie Laurence, dated May 27, 1977, credited to the Florida Times-Union / Jacksonville Journal, and features a picture of Jerry with the caption "Jerry Garcia is serious about his music."

The article is quite long and detailed, and highlights a few paragraphs by printing them entirely in a bold font. The first half is about the show, and the author makes a common observation, that "If the first set is a series of songs, the second set can only be called ecstasy, rock and roll, and totally unexpected."

In the second half of the article Laurence writes about meeting the band backstage after the show. After claiming Bob Weir "walks around in a semi-daze," she is a bit put off by Phil Lesh, writing that "to call the man anti-press is an understatement." Leslie manages to break through Phil's rough exterior, however, and much of her article ends up being about her conversation with him. She closes her piece by stating that she and Phil are "almost friends now" then suddenly and inexplicably finishes it with the sentence "Garcia walks by with a briefcase and smiles."

== Track listing ==
=== Disc One ===
May 19, 1977 – First Set:

1. "The Promised Land" (Chuck Berry) – 6:14
2. "Sugaree" > (Robert Hunter, Jerry Garcia) – 16:21
3. "El Paso" (Marty Robbins) – 5:04
4. "Peggy-O" (traditional, arr. Grateful Dead) – 8:34
5. "Looks Like Rain" (John Barlow, Bob Weir) – 8:59
6. "Row Jimmy" (Hunter, Garcia) – 11:29
7. "Passenger" (Peter Monk, Phil Lesh) – 3:59
8. "Loser" (Hunter, Garcia) – 8:38

=== Disc Two ===
May 19, 1977 – First Set:

1. "Dancing in the Streets" (Marvin Gaye, Ivy Joe Hunter, William Stevenson) – 13:47

May 19, 1977 – Second Set:

2. "Samson and Delilah" (traditional, arr. Weir) – 8:00
3. "Ramble on Rose" (Hunter, Garcia) – 8:38
4. "Estimated Prophet" (Barlow, Weir) – 10:09

October 11, 1977 bonus tracks:

5. "Not Fade Away" > (Buddy Holly, Norman Petty) – 16:39
6. "Wharf Rat" > (Hunter, Garcia) – 13:41
7. "Around and Around" (Berry) – 8:36

=== Disc Three ===
May 19, 1977 – Second Set:

1. "Lady with a Fan" / "Terrapin Station" > (Hunter, Garcia) – 11:43
2. "Playing in the Band" > (Hunter, Mickey Hart, Weir) – 11:07
3. "Uncle John's Band" > (Hunter, Garcia) – 11:47
4. "Drums" > (Hart, Bill Kreutzmann) – 5:28
5. "The Wheel" > (Hunter, Garcia) – 7:24
6. "China Doll" > (Hunter, Garcia) – 7:50
7. "Playing in the Band" (Hunter, Hart, Weir) – 10:33

=== Disc Four ===
May 21, 1977 – First Set:

1. "Bertha" (Hunter, Garcia) – 7:22
2. "Me and My Uncle" (John Phillips) – 3:52
3. "They Love Each Other" (Hunter, Garcia) – 8:10
4. "Cassidy" (Barlow, Weir) – 5:21
5. "Jack-A-Roe" (trad., arr. Grateful Dead) – 7:00
6. "Jack Straw" (Hunter, Weir) – 6:13
7. "Tennessee Jed" (Hunter, Garcia) – 9:41
8. "New Minglewood Blues" (trad., arr. Weir) – 5:38
9. "Row Jimmy" (Hunter, Garcia) – 11:28

=== Disc Five ===
May 21, 1977 — First Set:

1. "Passenger" (Monk, Lesh) – 4:16
2. "Scarlet Begonias" > (Hunter, Garcia) – 11:44
3. "Fire on the Mountain" (Hunter, Hart) – 12:53

May 21, 1977 — Second Set:

4. "Samson and Delilah" (trad., arr. Weir) – 7:45
5. "Brown-Eyed Women" (Hunter, Garcia) – 5:32

October 11, 1977 bonus tracks:

6. "Dancing in the Streets" > (Gaye, I. Hunter, Stevenson) – 17:38
7. "Dire Wolf" (Hunter, Garcia) – 3:52

=== Disc Six ===
May 21, 1977 — Second Set:

1. "Estimated Prophet" > (Barlow, Weir) – 11:27
2. "He's Gone" > (Hunter, Garcia) – 15:36
3. "Drums" > (Hart, Kreutzmann) – 4:09
4. "The Other One" > (Kreutzmann, Weir) – 11:39
5. "Comes a Time" > (Hunter, Garcia) – 11:52
6. "Saint Stephen" > (Hunter, Garcia, Lesh) – 4:37
7. "Not Fade Away" > (Holly, Petty) – 11:15
8. "St. Stephen" > (Hunter, Garcia, Lesh) – 1:46
9. "One More Saturday Night" (Weir) – 5:01

== Personnel ==
=== Grateful Dead ===
- Jerry Garcia – guitar, vocals
- Bob Weir – guitar, vocals
- Phil Lesh – electric bass
- Donna Godchaux – vocals
- Keith Godchaux – keyboards
- Mickey Hart – drums
- Bill Kreutzmann – drums

=== Production ===
- Betty Cantor-Jackson – recording
- Jeffrey Norman – CD mastering
- David Lemieux – tape archivist
- Eileen Law – archival research
- Robert Minkin – cover art and package design
- Jim Anderson – photography

== See also ==
- Dick's Picks Volume 3 - Features recordings from the same stretch of shows, on the night of May 22, 1977.
