= Salt Palace (arena) =

Former sports arena in Salt Lake City, Utah, U.S.

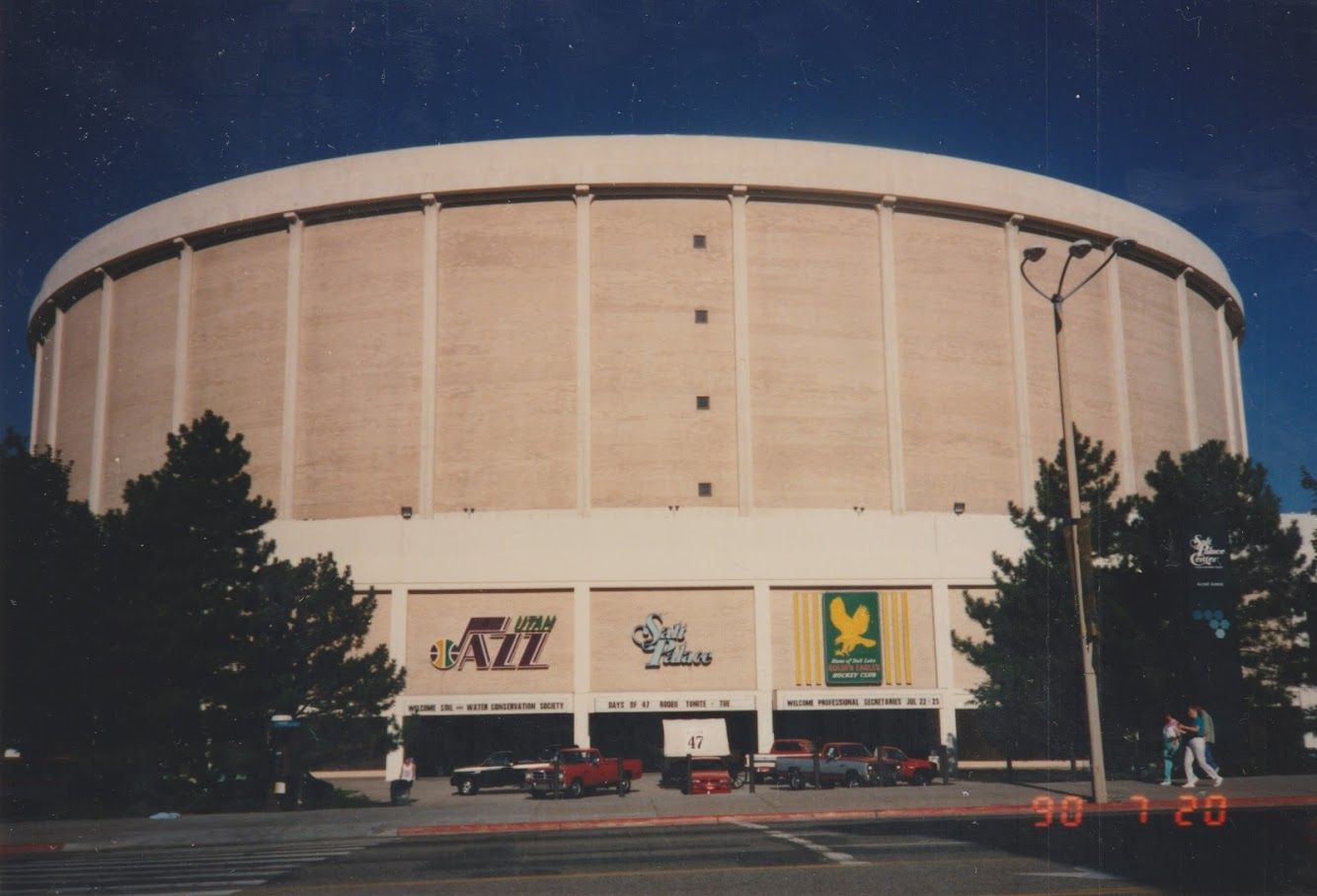
- Salt Palace as seen in 1990

- Location in Utah Location in the United States Location in North America
- Interactive map of Salt Palace
- Full name: Salt Palace Acord Arena (1980–1993)
- Address: 100 South West Temple
- Location: Salt Lake City, Utah, U.S.
- Coordinates: 40.766°N 111.895°W
- Owner: Salt Lake County
- Capacity: 12,616 (basketball); 10,594 (hockey)

Construction
- Groundbreaking: March 10, 1967; 59 years ago
- Opened: July 11, 1969; 57 years ago
- Expanded: 1981–1983
- Closed: 1993; 33 years ago
- Demolished: 1994; 32 years ago
- Cost: $17 million ($164 million in 2025 dollars)
- Architect: Bonneville Architects
- General contractors: Alfred Brown Co.; Robert E. McKee, Inc.

Tenants
- Salt Lake Golden Eagles (WHL/CHL/IHL) (1969–1991); Utah Stars (ABA) (1970–1975); Utah Jazz (NBA) (1979–1991); Utah Rollerbees (RHI) (1993)

The Salt Palace was an indoor arena located in downtown Salt Lake City, Utah, United States. Opened in 1969, the building hosted several professional sport teams, concerts, and other special events before it was closed and demolished in the 1990s to make way for the current Salt Palace Convention Center.

== First Salt Palace ==
The first Salt Palace in the city was a theater and dance hall at 900 South, between State and Main streets; its exterior was sprayed with salt crystals to reflect the sun. This structure was lost to a fire in 1910.

== Building history ==
Ground was broken for the county's "civic auditorium" in March 1967, and the Salt Palace opened in the summer of 1969 at a cost of $17 million with a seating capacity of 10,725. Later expanded to 12,666 seats, the venue was the home of the Utah Stars of the American Basketball Association from 1970 to 1975, the Salt Lake Golden Eagles hockey club from 1969 to 1991, and the NBA's Utah Jazz from 1979 to 1991.

Built on land that was once the "Little Tokyo" area of the city, construction was pushed by Salt Lake's bid committee for the 1972 Winter Olympics, which included Gen. Maxwell E. Rich, president of the Greater Salt Lake Chamber of Commerce, Gov. Cal Rampton, and Salt Lake Tribune publisher John W. Gallivan.

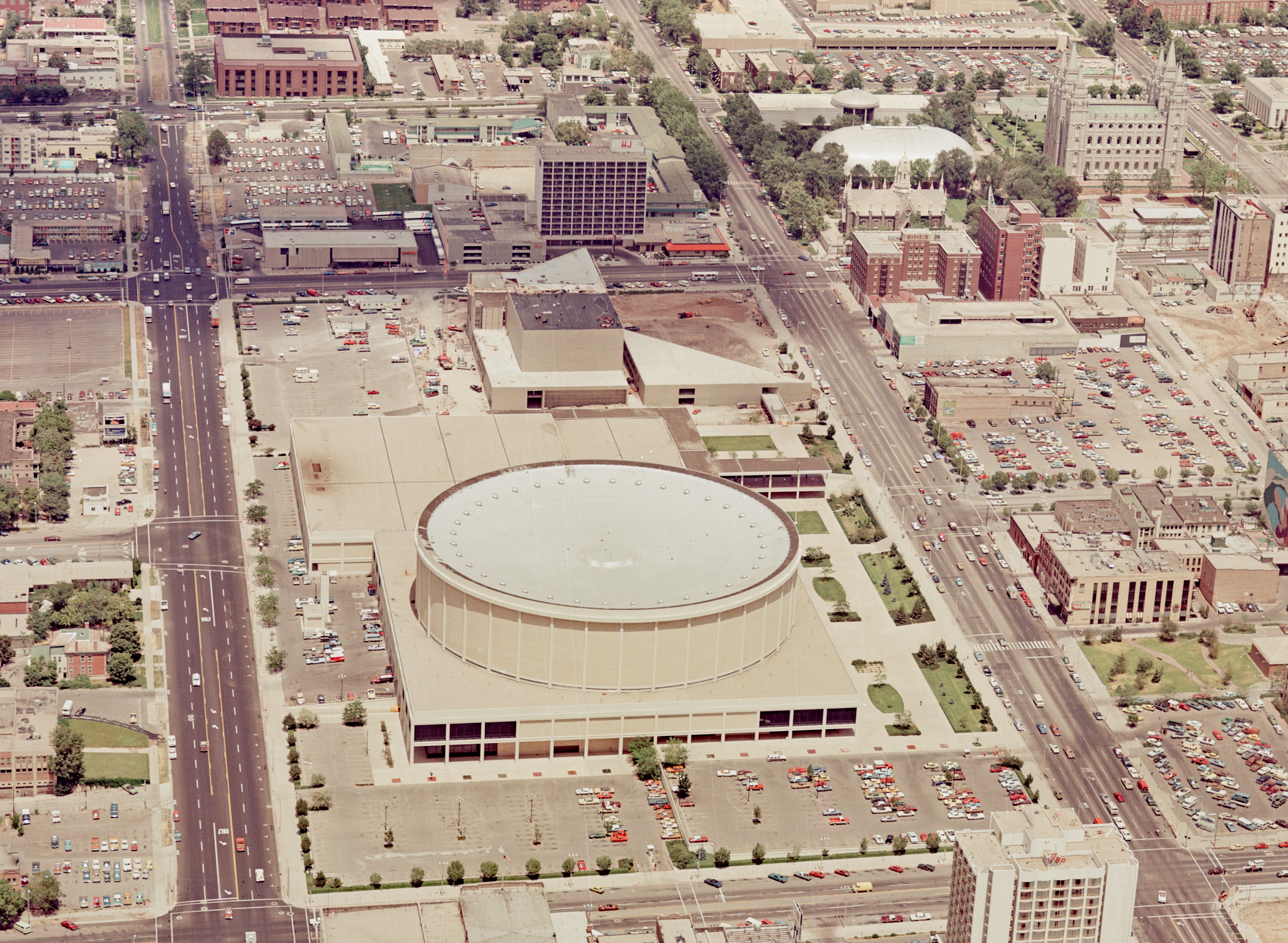
Salt Palace and surrounding area, 1978

From 1980 until the arena's closing, the arena was officially named the "Salt Palace Acord Arena" in memory of Thayne and Lorraine Acord. The elevation of the arena at street level was approximately 4,300 feet (1,310 m) above sea level.

Construction on an expansion to increase the building's exhibit space was started in December 1981 and dedicated on November 9, 1983. The project increased the building's footprint north to South Temple street and west, across 200 West street (which had to be tunneled under the new addition to avoid being closed off). This exhibit space addition was not demolished in the 1990s, but incorporated into the new convention center.

In 1994, three years after the Jazz moved into the new Delta Center, the Salt Palace was demolished. A convention center of the same name stands on the site today.

== Basketball ==
When the Los Angeles Stars of the ABA moved to Salt Lake City following the 1969–70 season, the Salt Palace had a major tenant. The Utah Stars were a major success initially, defeating the Kentucky Colonels in the ABA Finals and capturing the ABA Championship in 1970–71, behind Finals MVP Zelmo Beaty. The Stars set an ABA attendance record in that season (6,100 per game), and would continue to draw well and field excellent teams in the following seasons. The team reached the ABA Finals again in 1973–74, before losing to the New York Nets and Julius Erving.

Moses Malone was selected in the 1974 ABA Draft and joined the team directly out of high school. However, the franchise declined with a 38–46 season in 1974–75, despite drawing 8,500 fans per game. Financial problems plagued owners of the franchise in 1975 and the team folded on December 2 (4–12 record), after the franchise could not make payroll.

Less than six months later on May 19, the ABA Spirits of St. Louis announced that they planned to relocate to Salt Lake City and the Salt Palace as the Utah Rockies for the 1976–77 season. However, negotiations for the ABA-NBA merger were completed and the Spirits/Rockies were one of two ABA teams disbanded in the merger. The fan support that the Stars received established Salt Lake City as a viable basketball market, setting the stage for the NBA's New Orleans Jazz to relocate and become the Utah Jazz in 1979.

The final regular season game in the Salt Palace was a 107–93 win over the Los Angeles Lakers on April 20, 1991. Its final NBA game was in the second round of the playoffs, a three-point loss to the Portland Trail Blazers, 104–101 on May 12.

=== Seating capacity ===
Capacity over the years for basketball:

Years	Capacity
1969–1970	10,725
1970–1978	12,166
1978–1982	12,666
1982–1986	12,690
1986–1988	12,212
1988–1989	12,444
1989–1991	12,616

== Concerts ==
The Salt Palace was the place to play in Salt Lake City and hosted numerous concerts. The Grateful Dead played a show there on February 28, 1973 which was recorded and released as Dick's Picks Volume 28 and another 8½ years later on August 12, 1981.

== Concert deaths ==
Three teenagers were killed at an AC/DC rock concert at the Salt Palace on January 18, 1991. When AC/DC took the stage, the crowd rushed towards the stage, trampling the three. Security guards tried to get the band to stop playing but failed to quickly communicate the extent of the dire situation leading AC/DC to play for about 20 minutes before the band learned people were hurt or dying. The band stopped playing as soon as they discovered what had happened. Blame was pointed at several different groups, including the fans, the band, the security personnel and the Salt Palace's festival seating arrangement. The families of the victims sued AC/DC, as well as other groups associated with the concert, in connection with the deaths and eventually settled out of court.
