= Dave's Picks Volume 58 =

Live album by Grateful Dead
- Released: May 1, 2026
- Recorded: December 18, 1973
- Venues: Curtis Hixon Hall, Tampa
- Genre: Rock
- Length: 219:30 (Bonus disc 76:25)
- Label: Rhino

Grateful Dead chronology
Boston Music Hall, Boston, MA 6/11/76 (2026)	Dave's Picks Volume 58 (2026)	Fillmore Auditorium, San Francisco, CA, July 3, 1966 (2026)

Alternative cover
- Dave's Picks Bonus Disc 2026

Dave's Picks Volume 58 is a three-CD live album by the American rock band Grateful Dead. It was recorded on December 18, 1973, at Curtis Hixon Hall in Tampa, Florida. It was released on May 1, 2026, in a limited edition of 25,000 copies. It is a part of the live album archival series Dave's Picks, a series overseen by and named after David Lemieux, the tape archivist for the band.

Some copies of the album include a bonus disc with songs from the December 12, 1973 concert at Omni Coliseum in Atlanta.

== Background ==
On December 18 and 19, 1973, the band performed at Curtis Hixon Hall in Tampa, Florida. This album documents the first of the two performances. The second of the two was released on the first volume in the Dick's Picks series of albums, overseen by and named after Dick Latvala, Lemieux's predecessor as tape archivist.

== Critical reception ==
In Glide Magazine, Doug Collette wrote, "The late Bob Weir extolled the virtues of the Grateful Dead as a five-piece band, and sure enough, Dave's Picks Volume 58 boasts musicianship absolutely sublime in both its unity and intricacy.... And, if the overall impact that is this installment of the ongoing vault initiative is not quite the euphoric experience chief archivist David Lemieux describes in his essay in the sixteen-page booklet... it nevertheless comes pretty close."

== Track listing ==
Disc 1

First set:

1. "Tennessee Jed" (Jerry Garcia, Robert Hunter) – 9:03
2. "Me and My Uncle" (John Phillips) – 3:36
3. "Don't Ease Me In" (traditional, arranged by Grateful Dead) – 4:34
4. "Looks Like Rain" (Bob Weir, John Perry Barlow) – 7:44
5. "They Love Each Other" (Garcia, Hunter) – 6:14
6. "Me and Bobby McGee" (Kris Kristofferson, Fred Foster) – 6:09
7. "Brown-Eyed Women" (Garcia, Hunter) – 5:31
8. "Beat It On Down the Line" (Jesse Fuller) – 3:51
9. "Peggy-O" (traditional, arranged by Grateful Dead) – 5:55
10. "El Paso" (Marty Robbins) – 4:56
11. "Deal" (Garcia, Hunter) – 5:35
12. "Jack Straw" (Weir, Hunter) – 5:12

Disc 2

First set, continued:

1. "China Cat Sunflower" > (Garcia, Hunter) – 8:55
2. "I Know You Rider" (traditional, arranged by Grateful Dead) – 5:30

Second set:

3. "Promised Land" > (Chuck Berry) – 4:30
4. "Bertha" > (Garcia, Hunter) – 6:02
5. "Greatest Story Ever Told" (Weir, Mickey Hart, Hunter) – 5:48
6. "Row Jimmy" (Garcia, Hunter) – 9:29

Encore:

7. "Uncle John's Band" (Garcia, Hunter) – 8:11

Bonus tracks – December 12, 1973 – Omni Coliseum:

8. "Eyes of the World" > (Garcia, Hunter) – 12:40
9. "Morning Dew" (Bonnie Dobson, Tim Rose) – 14:21

Disc 3

Second set, continued:

1. "Weather Report Suite" > – 17:01
  - "Prelude" (Weir) – 1:57
  - "Part I" (Weir, Eric Andersen) – 4:57
  - "Part II (Let It Grow)" (Weir, Barlow) – 10:08
2. "Dark Star" > (Garcia, Hart, Bill Kreutzmann, Phil Lesh, Ron McKernan, Weir, Hunter) – 21:57
3. "Drums" > (Kreutzmann) – 2:01
4. "Eyes of the World" > (Garcia, Hunter) – 14:05
5. "Wharf Rat" > (Garcia, Hunter) – 10:05
6. "Sugar Magnolia" (Weir, Hunter) – 10:31

Dave's Picks 2026 Bonus Disc

December 12, 1973 – Omni Coliseum – selections:

1. "Sugaree" (Garcia, Hunter) – 8:04
2. "Peggy-O" (traditional, arranged by Grateful Dead) – 5:38
3. "Playing in the Band" (Weir, Hart, Hunter) – 23:15
4. "China Cat Sunflower" > (Garcia, Hunter) – 8:30
5. "I Know You Rider" (traditional, arranged by Grateful Dead) – 5:13
6. "Weather Report Suite" – 16:27
  - "Prelude" (Weir) – 1:22
  - "Part I" (Weir, Andersen) – 4:32
  - "Part II (Let It Grow)" (Weir, Barlow) – 10:33
7. "Wharf Rat" (Garcia, Hunter) – 9:17

== Personnel ==
Grateful Dead

- Jerry Garcia – guitar, vocals
- Keith Godchaux – keyboards
- Bill Kreutzmann – drums
- Phil Lesh – bass, vocals
- Bob Weir – guitar, vocals

Production

- Produced by Grateful Dead
- Produced for release by David Lemieux
- Executive producer: Mark Pinkus
- Associate producer: Ivette Ramos
- Mastering: Jeffrey Norman
- Recording: Kidd Candelerio
- Art direction, design: Steve Vance
- Cover art: Chelsea Housand
- Photos: Rick Norcross
