= Boston Music Hall, Boston, MA 6/11/76 =

Live album by Grateful Dead
- Released: April 18, 2026
- Recorded: June 11, 1976
- Venue: Boston Music Hall (Boston)
- Labels: Grateful Dead; Rhino
- Producer: David Lemieux

Grateful Dead chronology
Dave's Picks Volume 57 (2026)	Boston Music Hall, Boston, MA 6/11/76 (2026)	Dave's Picks Volume 58 (2026)

Boston Music Hall, Boston, MA 6/11/76 is a live album by American rock band the Grateful Dead. It was released on April 18, 2026, as a 5-LP set for Record Store Day. The album, which is limited to 7,600 copies, contains the band's performance at the Boston Music Hall in Boston, Massachusetts, on June 11, 1976. This recording was previously released in 2020 as part of the concert box set June 1976.

The release of the album coincided with a performance commemorating the 50th anniversary of the concert at the Boch Center Wang Theatre Grand Lobby in Boston, organized by the Folk Americana Roots Hall of Fame.

== Track listing ==
Side one

1. "Might as Well" (Jerry Garcia, Robert Hunter) – 6:09
2. "Mama Tried" (Merle Haggard) – 3:24
3. "Tennessee Jed" (Garcia, Hunter) – 9:03
4. "Cassidy" (Bob Weir, John Perry Barlow) – 4:30

Side two

1. "Candyman" (Garcia, Hunter) – 8:37
2. "Big River" (Johnny Cash) – 5:41

Side three

1. "Scarlet Begonias" (Garcia, Hunter) – 10:36 →
2. "Looks Like Rain" (Weir, Barlow) – 8:11

Side four

1. "It Must Have Been the Roses" (Hunter) – 7:23
2. "Lazy Lightning" (Weir, Barlow) – 2:53 →
3. "Supplication" (Weir, Barlow) – 4:52

Side five

1. "Brown-Eyed Women" (Garcia, Hunter) – 6:09
2. "Promised Land" (Chuck Berry) – 3:37

Side six

1. "St. Stephen" (Garcia, Phil Lesh, Hunter) – 9:44 →
2. "Dancing in the Street" (Marvin Gaye, William "Mickey" Stevenson, Ivy Jo Hunter) – 12:10

Side seven

1. "The Music Never Stopped" (Weir, Barlow) – 5:47
2. "Ship of Fools" (Garcia, Hunter) – 7:29
3. "Samson and Delilah" (traditional, arr. Bob Weir) – 6:03

Side eight

1. "Sugaree" (Garcia, Hunter) – 10:40

Side nine

1. "Sugar Magnolia" (Weir, Hunter) – 6:29 →
2. "Eyes of the World" – 13:20

Side ten

1. "Stella Blue" (Garcia, Hunter) – 10:56
2. "Sunshine Daydream" (Weir, Hunter) – 3:29
3. "Johnny B. Goode" (Berry) – 4:14

== Personnel ==
Grateful Dead

- Jerry Garcia – guitar, vocals
- Bob Weir – guitar, vocals
- Keith Godchaux – keyboards
- Donna Jean Godchaux – vocals
- Phil Lesh – bass
- Bill Kreutzmann – drums
- Mickey Hart – drums

Production

- Produced by Grateful Dead
- Produced for release by David Lemieux
- Recording: Betty Cantor-Jackson
- Mastering: Jeffrey Norman
