= Japanese Church of Christ =

Historic church in Salt Lake City, Utah, U.S.

- U.S. National Register of Historic Places
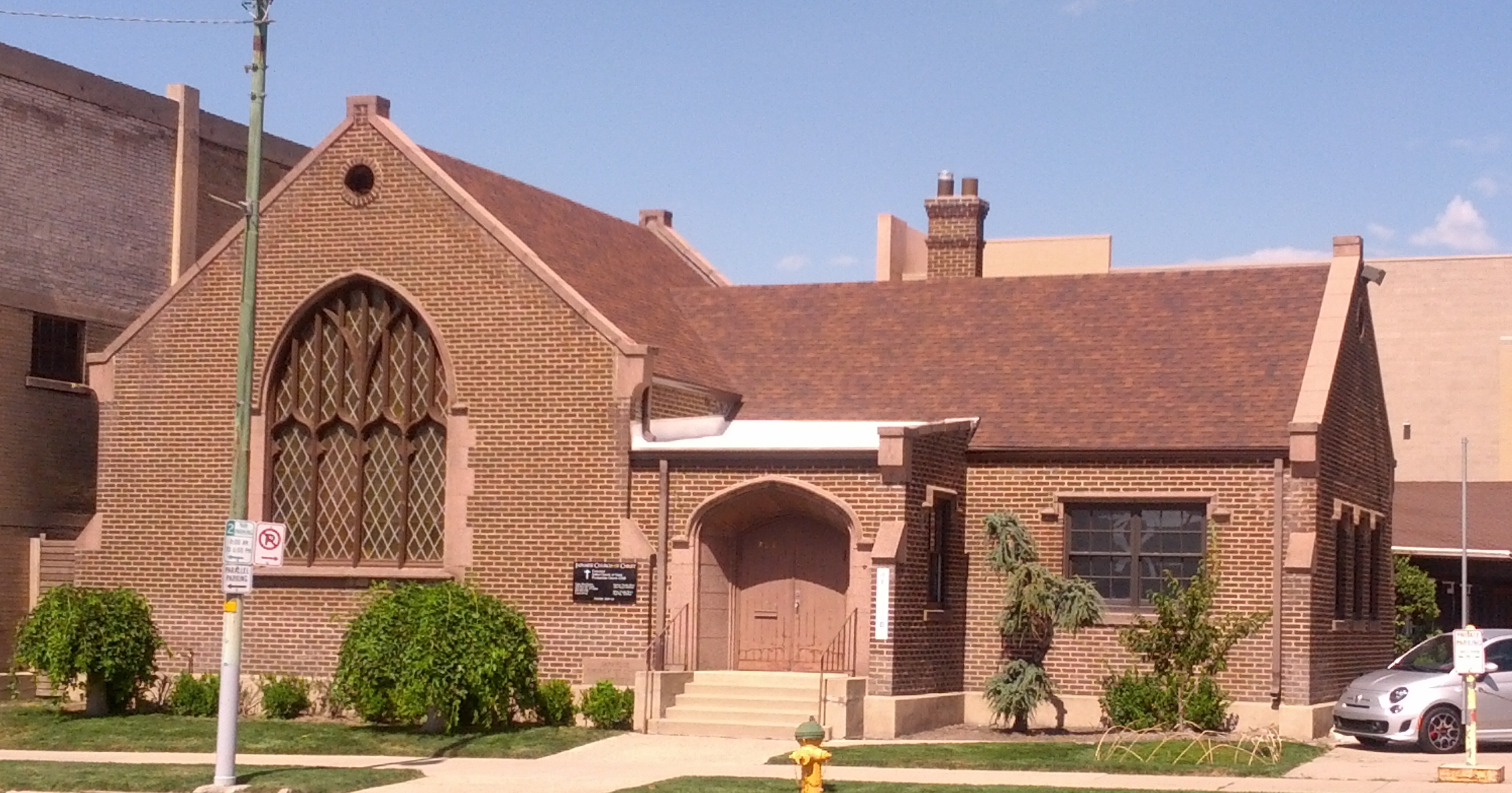

- Location within Utah Location within the United States
- Location: 268 W. 100 South, Salt Lake City, Utah
- Coordinates: 40°46′3″N 111°53′54″W
- Area: 0 acres (0 ha)
- Built: 1924
- Architect: Chytraus, E.
- Architectural style: Late Gothic Revival
- Website: http://www.jccslc.net
- MPS: Salt Lake City Business District MRA
- NRHP reference No.: 82004144
- Added to NRHP: August 17, 1982

Japanese Church of Christ is a historic church at 268 W. 100 South in Salt Lake City, Utah.

The Gothic Revival church building was constructed in 1924 and added to the National Register of Historic Places in 1982. From 1953 to 1967, the church housed two separate branches for Issei and Nisei. As of 2012 the congregation is affiliated with the Presbyterian Church (U.S.A.).
