= Road Trips Volume 1 Number 1 =

Live album by Grateful Dead
- Released: November 5, 2007
- Recorded: Fall, 1979
- Genre: Rock
- Length: 156:28 bonus disc: 77:26
- Label: Grateful Dead
- Producer: Grateful Dead

Grateful Dead chronology
Three from the Vault (2007)	Road Trips Volume 1 Number 1 (2007)	Road Trips Full Show: Spectrum 11/5/79 (2008)

Alternative cover
- Road Trips Volume 1 Number 1 Bonus Disc

Professional ratings
Review scores
Source	Rating
All About Jazz	(favorable)
Allmusic	4/5 stars
The Music Box	3.5/5 stars
Rolling Stone	4/5 stars

Road Trips Volume 1 Number 1 is a live album by the Grateful Dead. It contains highlights from their fall 1979 tour of the East Coast. It was released on November 5, 2007.

== Track listing ==
Disc 1
No.	Title	Recording venue and date	Length
1.	"Alabama Getaway >" (Jerry Garcia, Robert Hunter)	Crisler Arena, 11/10/79	5:31
2.	"Promised Land" (Chuck Berry)	Crisler Arena, 11/10/79	4:44
3.	"Jack Straw >" (Bob Weir, Hunter)	The Spectrum, 11/6/79	6:47
4.	"Deal" (Garcia, Hunter)	The Spectrum, 11/6/79	6:48
5.	"Dancing in the Street >" (William "Mickey" Stevenson, Marvin Gaye, Ivy Jo Hunter)	Memorial Auditorium, 11/9/79	13:10
6.	"Franklin's Tower" (Garcia, Bill Kreutzmann, Hunter)	Memorial Auditorium, 11/9/79	12:04
7.	"Wharf Rat >" (Garcia, Hunter)	Memorial Auditorium, 11/9/79	11:15
8.	"I Need a Miracle >" (Weir, John Perry Barlow)	Memorial Auditorium, 11/9/79	4:04
9.	"Bertha >" (Garcia, Hunter)	Memorial Auditorium, 11/9/79	5:52
10.	"Good Lovin' " (Arthur Resnick, Rudy Clark)	Memorial Auditorium, 11/9/79	7:08

Disc 2
No.	Title	Recording venue and date	Length
1.	"Shakedown Street" (Garcia, Hunter)	New Haven Coliseum, 10/25/79	15:32
2.	"Passenger" (Phil Lesh, Peter Monk)	Crisler Arena, 11/10/79	6:04
3.	"Terrapin Station >" (Garcia, Hunter)	The Spectrum, 11/6/79	15:25
4.	"Playing in the Band" (Weir, Mickey Hart, Hunter)	The Spectrum, 11/6/79	22:17
5.	"Not Fade Away >" (Buddy Holly, Norman Petty)	Capital Centre, 11/8/79	9:27
6.	"Morning Dew" (Bonnie Dobson, Tim Rose)	Capital Centre, 11/8/79	10:13

Bonus Disc
No.	Title	Recording venue and date	Length
1.	"China Cat Sunflower >" (Garcia, Hunter)	Nassau Veterans Memorial Coliseum, 10/31/79	7:29
2.	"I Know You Rider" (traditional, arranged by Grateful Dead)	Nassau Veterans Memorial Coliseum, 10/31/79	8:07
3.	"Lost Sailor >" (Weir, Barlow)	Capital Centre, 11/8/79	6:30
4.	"Saint of Circumstance >" (Weir, Barlow)	Capital Centre, 11/8/79	5:41
5.	"Jam" (Grateful Dead)	Capital Centre, 11/8/79	7:20
6.	"Althea" (Garcia, Hunter)	Nassau Veterans Memorial Coliseum, 10/31/79	9:42
7.	"Estimated Prophet >" (Weir, Barlow)	Memorial Auditorium, 11/9/79	13:16
8.	"He's Gone >" (Garcia, Hunter)	Memorial Auditorium, 11/9/79	10:35
9.	"Jam" (Grateful Dead)	Memorial Auditorium, 11/9/79	8:41

== Credits ==
=== Grateful Dead ===
- Jerry Garcia – guitar, vocals
- Mickey Hart – drums
- Bill Kreutzmann – drums
- Phil Lesh – bass
- Brent Mydland – keyboards, vocals
- Bob Weir – guitar, vocals

=== Production ===
- Produced by Grateful Dead
- Compilation produced by David Lemieux and Blair Jackson
- Recorded by Dan Healy
- Edited and mastered by Jeffrey Norman at Garage Audio Mastering
- Cover art by Scott McDougall
- Photos by Jay Blakesberg, Herb Greene, Larry Hulst, and Bob Minkin
- Package design by Steve Vance
- Liner notes written by Blair Jackson

== Sound quality ==
A label on the CD case for Road Trips Volume 1 Number 1 states, "The compact discs herein have been digitally remastered directly from original soundboard cassettes. They are historical snapshots, not modern professional recordings, and may therefore exhibit occasional technical anomalies and unavoidable ravages of time."

The album was released in HDCD format. This provides enhanced sound quality when played on CD players with HDCD capability, and is fully compatible with regular CD players.

== Recording dates ==
Road Trips Volume 1 Number 1 contains selections from the following concerts:

- New Haven Coliseum, New Haven, Connecticut, 10/25/79
- Nassau Veterans Memorial Coliseum, Uniondale, New York, 10/31/79
- The Spectrum, Philadelphia, Pennsylvania, 11/6/79
- Capital Centre, Landover, Maryland, 11/8/79
- Memorial Auditorium, Buffalo, New York, 11/9/79
- Crisler Arena, Ann Arbor, Michigan, 11/10/79
