= Ray Robertson =

Canadian novelist

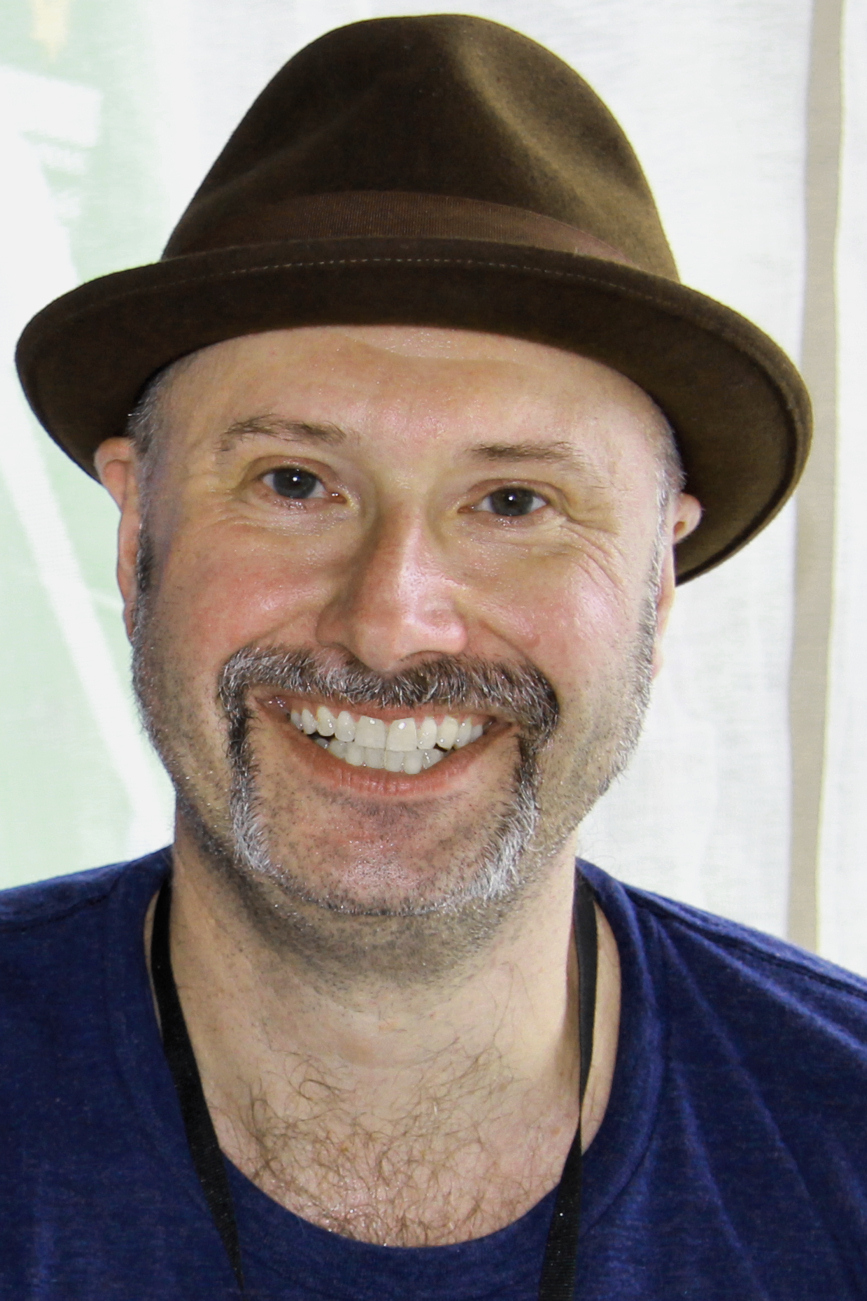
- Ray Robertson at the 2013 Texas Book Festival.
- Born: Chatham, Ontario, Canada
- Occupations: Novelist, essayist
- Website: www.rayrobertson.com

Ray Robertson is the author of nine novels, seven collections of non-fiction, and a book of poetry. His work has been translated into several languages. He contributed the liner notes to three Grateful Dead archival releases: Dave’s Picks #45, the Here Comes Sunshine 1973 box set, and the Mars Hotel 50th Anniversary edition. Born and raised in Chatham, Ontario, he lives Toronto.

== Bibliography ==
=== Novels ===
- Home Movies. Cormorant Books, 1997
- Heroes. Dundurn, 2000
- Moody Food. Doubleday, 2002
- Gently Down the Stream. Cormorant Books, 2005
- What Happened Later. Thomas Allen Publishers, 2007
- David. Thomas Allen Publishers, 2009
- I Was There the Night He Died. Biblioasis, 2014
- 1979. Biblioasis, 2018
- Estates Large and Small. Biblioasis, 2022

=== Non-fiction ===
- Mental Hygiene: Essays on Writers and Writing. Insomniac Press, 2003
- Why Not? Fifteen Reasons to Live. Biblioasis, 2011
- Lives of the Poets (with Guitars). Biblioasis, 2016
- How to Die: A Book About Being Alive. Biblioasis, 2020
- All the Years Combine: The Grateful Dead in Fifty Shows. Biblioasis, 2023
- Dust: More Lives of the Poets (with Guitars). Biblioasis, 2025
- The Right to be Wrong. Cormorant Books, 2026

=== Poetry ===
- The Old Man in the Mirror Isn't Me: Last Call Haiku. Exile, 2020

== Accolades ==
In 2024 Robertson was inducted into the Chatham-Kent Cultural Hall of Fame in its 'Literary Arts' category, in recognition of his work as a novelist and essayist.
