= Johnny Dwork =

- Born: John R. Dwork; October 22, 1959 (age 67)
- Occupations: Athlete; Grateful Dead scholar; artist

Johnny Dwork (born October 22, 1959) is a two-time world champion flying disc freestyle athlete, Grateful Dead scholar and author, event producer, and multimedia artist.

== Early life ==
Johnny Dwork, the only son of Dr. Kerry and Bonnie Dwork, was born and raised in New York City.

== Career ==
=== Flying Disc Freestyle World Champion ===
Dwork is a two-time world champion flying disc freestyle athlete. Dwork also holds the world's only Bachelor of Arts degree for studies in Professional Flying Disc Entertainment and Education, awarded by Hampshire College in 1984.

=== Grateful Dead Scholar and Author ===
While attending Hampshire College, Dwork started the Hampshire College Grateful Dead Historical Society, where he began publishing the Grateful Dead research newsletter DeadBeat. Upon graduating from Hampshire College, Dwork began co-publishing the in-concert Grateful Dead newsletter Terrapin Flyer. Dwork then co-founded the international music culture magazine Dupree's Diamond News, and for ten years served as its editor and publisher. Dwork is co-author and editor of The Deadhead's Taping Compendium, an award-winning, three-volume encyclopedia of the Grateful Dead's music on tape. In 2013, the Grateful Dead included an essay penned by Dwork in the book accompanying the box set release of Sunshine Daydream, the Grateful Dead's all-time most requested live concert recording.

=== Event Producer ===
Mentored during college by Bill Graham, Dwork is a pioneer of "transformational festivals" based on mythic themes, environmental production ethics, and audience participation. Dwork is the Creative Director of Peak Experience Productions, and has produced and co-produced many music and performance arts concerts and festivals across the United States, including the Gathering of the Vibes Festival, and in venues such the New York City's Wetlands Preserve.

=== Multimedia Artist ===
Dwork is the creator of the L'HA! Laser Harp Alembic, which was featured at the Harmony Festival in 2011, at the Portland Art Museum in 2012, at The Tech Museum of Innovation in 2014, and at the Oregon Museum of Science and Industry in 2015.

=== Activist ===
Dwork is a lifelong social and environmental activist. As publisher of Dupree's Diamond News, Dwork partnered with The Nature Conservancy to raise the funds and awareness for saving thousands of acres of endangered rainforest. In the 1980s, Dwork served as the President of the Pioneer Valley Resettlement Project. Dwork also served as a business and creative advisor to the founder of Wetlands Preserve, and is featured in the film "Wetlands Preserved, The Story of an Activist Nightclub." Dwork also sits on the advisory boards of numerous nonprofit organizations, including The Threshold Foundation and The Prayer Rock Foundation.
