= Shakedown Street (vending area) =

Area of a jam band parking lot where the vending takes place

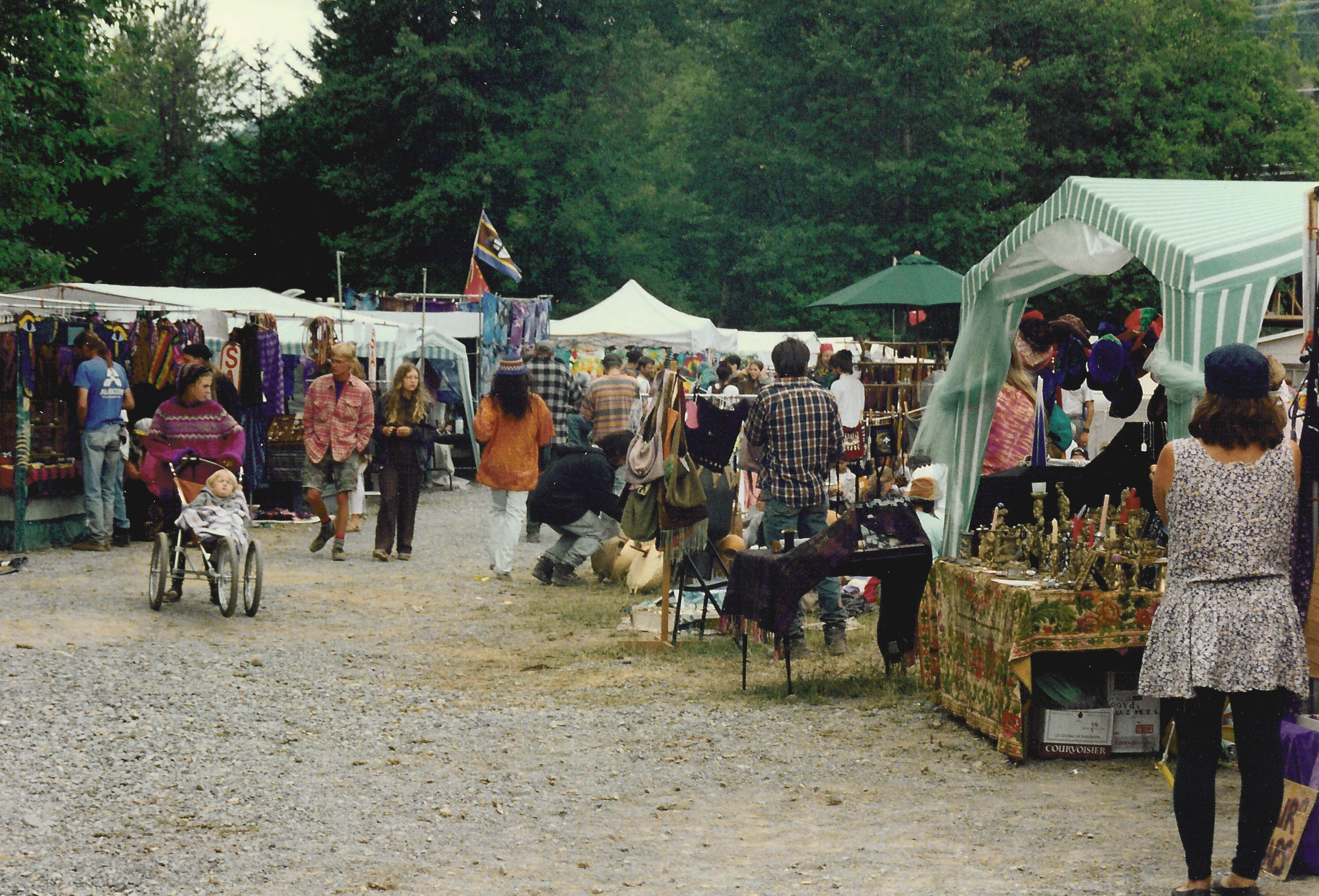
A vending area at the Starlight Mountain Festival

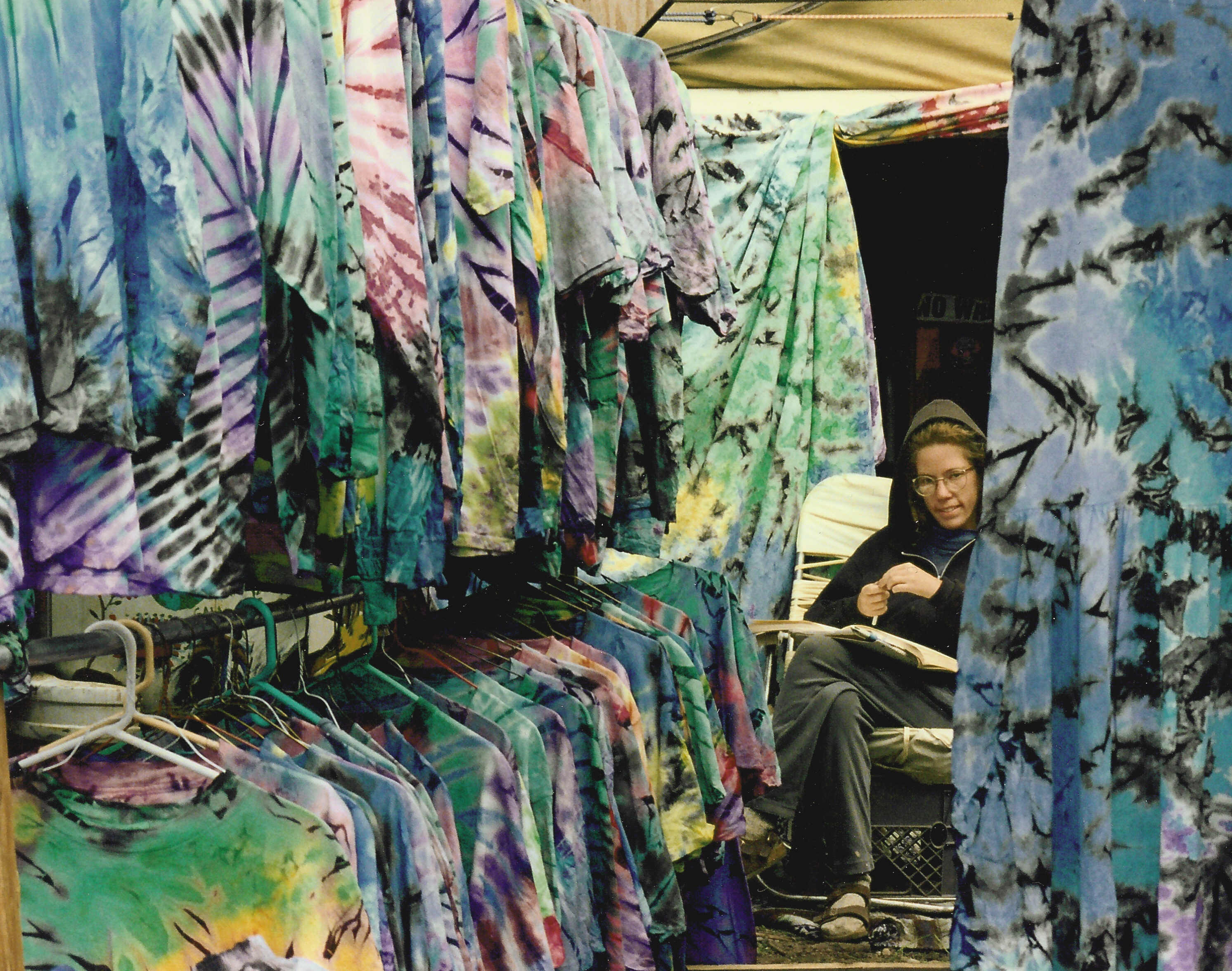
Tie-dye shirts for sale at the Starlight Mountain Festival

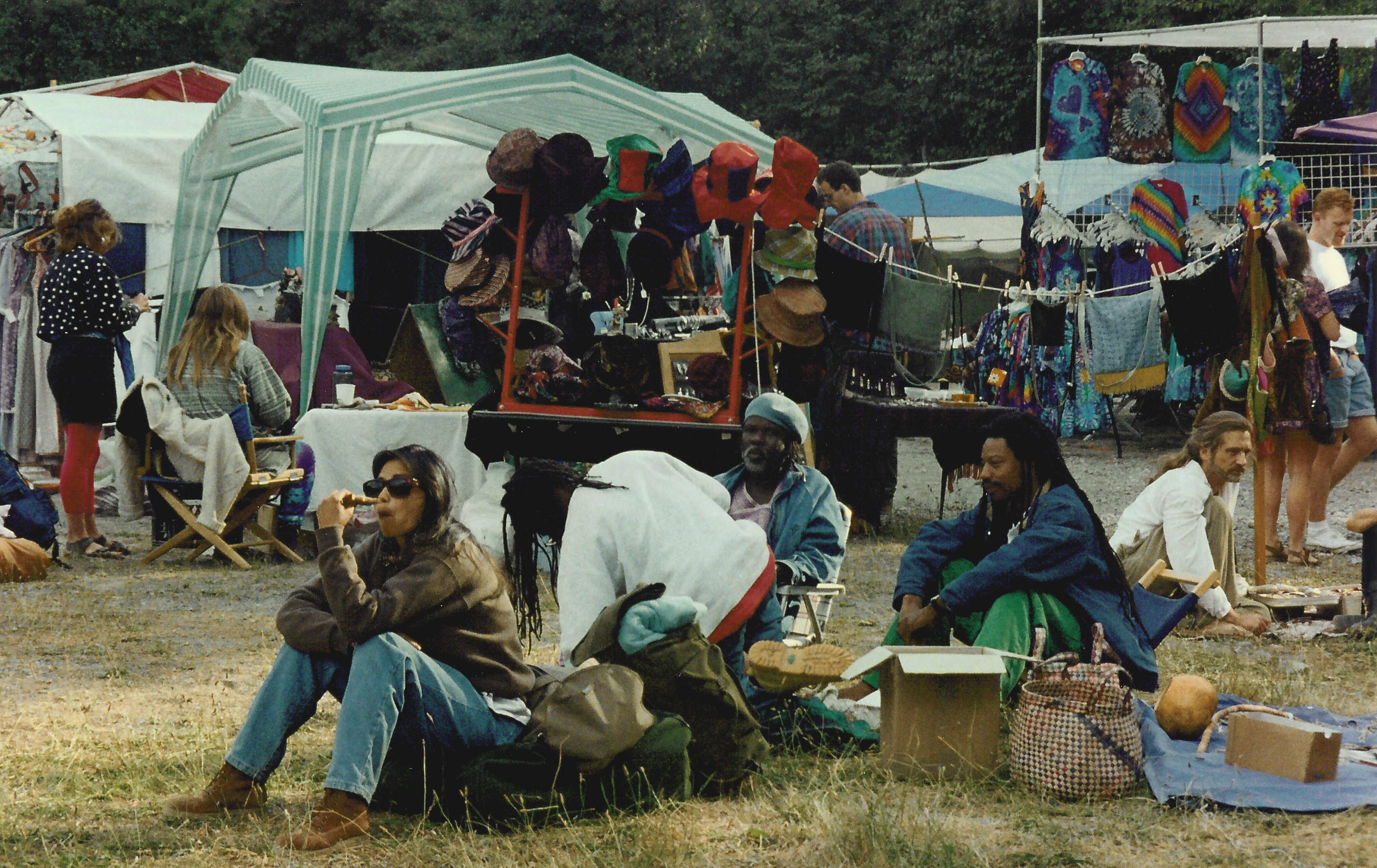
Vendors and concert attendees at the Starlight Mountain Festival

Shakedown Street is the area of a jam band parking lot where the vending takes place. It is named after the Grateful Dead song of the same name, and began in the early 1980s in the parking lots at Grateful Dead concerts. Items sold have included food, and beverages such as alcoholic beverages, clothing (such as T-shirts) and jewelry, among others. Ticket scalping may also occur.

== Tailgating ==
In the Deadhead community, and other like-minded musical scenes, a unique tailgating culture evolved. More than just a party for fans, it is a way for the faithful to sell wares which in turn fund their tickets and gas to the next concert in order to spend weeks, months, or even entire tours on the road. Along with the more traditional fare and beverages such as individual cans or bottles of beer, there may be a selection of vegetarian food such as grilled cheese sandwiches, egg rolls, burritos, falafel, quesadillas, and pizza. Certain illicit foods such as hash brownies and "ganja gooballs" are also sometimes found in the parking lots. Other products available for the tailgaters include handmade jewelry, bumper stickers, t-shirts, drugs, or drug paraphernalia.

== Socialization ==
The Shakedown Street vending scene also provides a common area where touring music fans may socialize with one-another while traveling from show to show during a band's concert tour. This can instill a sense of community among fellow touring concert goers.

== Concerts with similar vending areas ==
- The Grateful Dead
- Dark Star Orchestra
- Disco Biscuits
- əkoostik hookah
- Furthur
- Phil Lesh and Friends
- Phish
- Ratdog
- The String Cheese Incident
- Widespread Panic
- Dead & Company
- The Allman Brothers Band
- Billy Strings
- King Gizzard & the Lizard Wizard

== In popular culture ==
Chef Ra purveyed his rasta pasta dish in the Shakedown Street area of parking lots at many Grateful Dead concerts.

Shakedown Street is referenced in the television show American Dad in season 16 episode 4, titled “Shakedown Steve.”
