= Deadhead =

Dedicated fan of the Grateful Dead or spinoff bands from the Grateful Dead

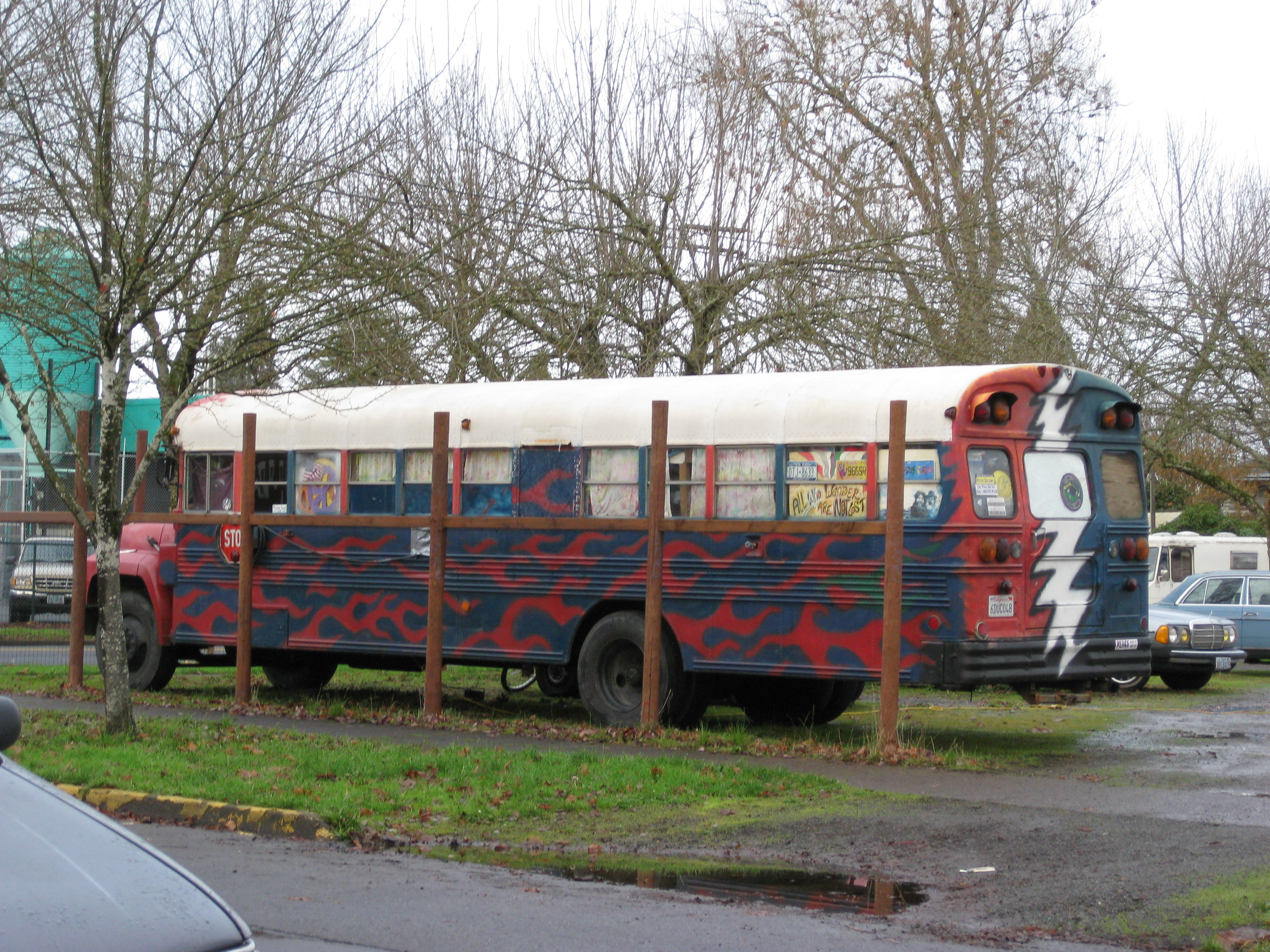
A Deadhead school bus conversion

A Deadhead or Dead head is a fan of the American rock band the Grateful Dead. The Deadhead subculture originated in the 1970s, when a number of fans began traveling to see the Grateful Dead in as many shows or festival venues as they could. As more people began attending live performances and festivals, a community developed. The Deadhead community has since gone on to create slang and idioms unique to them.

Grateful Dead enthusiasts view each concert as a unique event due to the band's extensive improvisation, eclectic song choice and other variables. The wide variety of their live concerts, when coupled with the band's permissive attitude on taping performances, has created a plethora of historical material. Such recordings of previous performances are shared widely among the Deadhead community.

Much Deadhead-related historical material received or collected by the band over the years is housed in the Grateful Dead Archive of University of California, Santa Cruz. Archive founding curator Nicholas Meriwether, who has also written extensively about the culture and its impact on society, predicted, "The Grateful Dead archive is going to end up being a critical way for us to approach and understand the 1960s and the counterculture of the era... It's also going to tell us a lot about the growth and development of modern rock theater, and it's helping us understand fan culture." Over the course of their thirty-year career, the Grateful Dead performed over 2,200 live shows.

== Overview ==
The eclectic musical styling of the Grateful Dead was heavily inspired by the Beatnik movement of the 1950s and later the psychedelic counterculture of the 1960s. One group at the forefront of the psychedelic sound was the Merry Pranksters. On the first historic bus trip, on the bus Furthur, a pattern was set for the Deadhead touring lifestyle to come. By the late 1970s, some Deadheads began to sell tie-dye T-shirts, veggie burritos, or other items at Grateful Dead concerts. In the 1980s, the area where Grateful Dead merchandise was sold became popularly referred to as "Shakedown Street", named after the 1978 song. Income from these shops allowed Deadheads a way to follow the band on its tours.

During the early 1980s, the number of Deadheads taping shows increased, and the band created a special section for fans who wished to record the show. These tapes are still shared and circulated today via websites such as the Live Music Archive and bt.etree.org. In the earlier days of the Grateful Dead, there were questions as to whether or not it was in the best interest of the band for fans to tape concerts. In 1982, Garcia himself was asked what he thought about it, and he replied, "When we are done with it [the concerts], they can have it."

The practice of taping has evolved and expanded in the digital age. The rise of the Internet and peer to peer file sharing networks has made it extremely easy for Deadheads to share concerts through unofficial and official channels. Bob Dylan, who toured with the Grateful Dead during their 1987 summer tour, observed "With most bands the audience participates like in a spectator sport. They just stand there and watch. They keep a distance. With the Dead, the audience is part of the band-they might as well be on stage."

== Origins ==
The term "Deadhead" first appeared in print at the suggestion of Hank Harrison, author of The Dead Trilogy, on the sleeve of Grateful Dead (also known as Skull & Roses), the band's second live album, released in 1971. It read:

DEAD FREAKS UNITE: Who are you? Where are you? How are you?

Send us your name and address and we'll keep you informed.

Dead Heads, P.O. Box 1065, San Rafael, California 94901.

This phenomenon was first touched on in print by Robert Christgau, music critic for Village Voice, at a Felt Forum show in 1971. He noted "how many 'regulars' seemed to be in attendance, and how, from the way they compared notes, they'd obviously made a determined effort to see as many shows as possible."

Eileen Law, a long time friend of the band, was put in charge of the mailing list and maintained the Dead Heads newsletter. It is estimated that by the end of 1971, the band had received about 350 letters, but this number swelled greatly over the next few years to as many as 40,000. In total, 25 mailings/newsletters reached Deadheads between October 1971 and February 1980. After this time, the Grateful Dead Almanac would succeed it, with this eventually being abandoned for Dead.net. Those who did receive the newsletter in the 1970s often found pleasant surprises sent along. One example is from May 1974 when Heads received a sample EP of Robert Hunter's upcoming album Tales of the Great Rum Runners as well as selections from Jerry Garcia's second album, Compliments of Garcia, and some cuts that were from bandmembers Keith and Donna Godchaux's eponymous solo album, Keith & Donna, both on Round Records. This sample was titled Anton Round, which was an alias used by Ron Rakow.

== Impact on shows ==
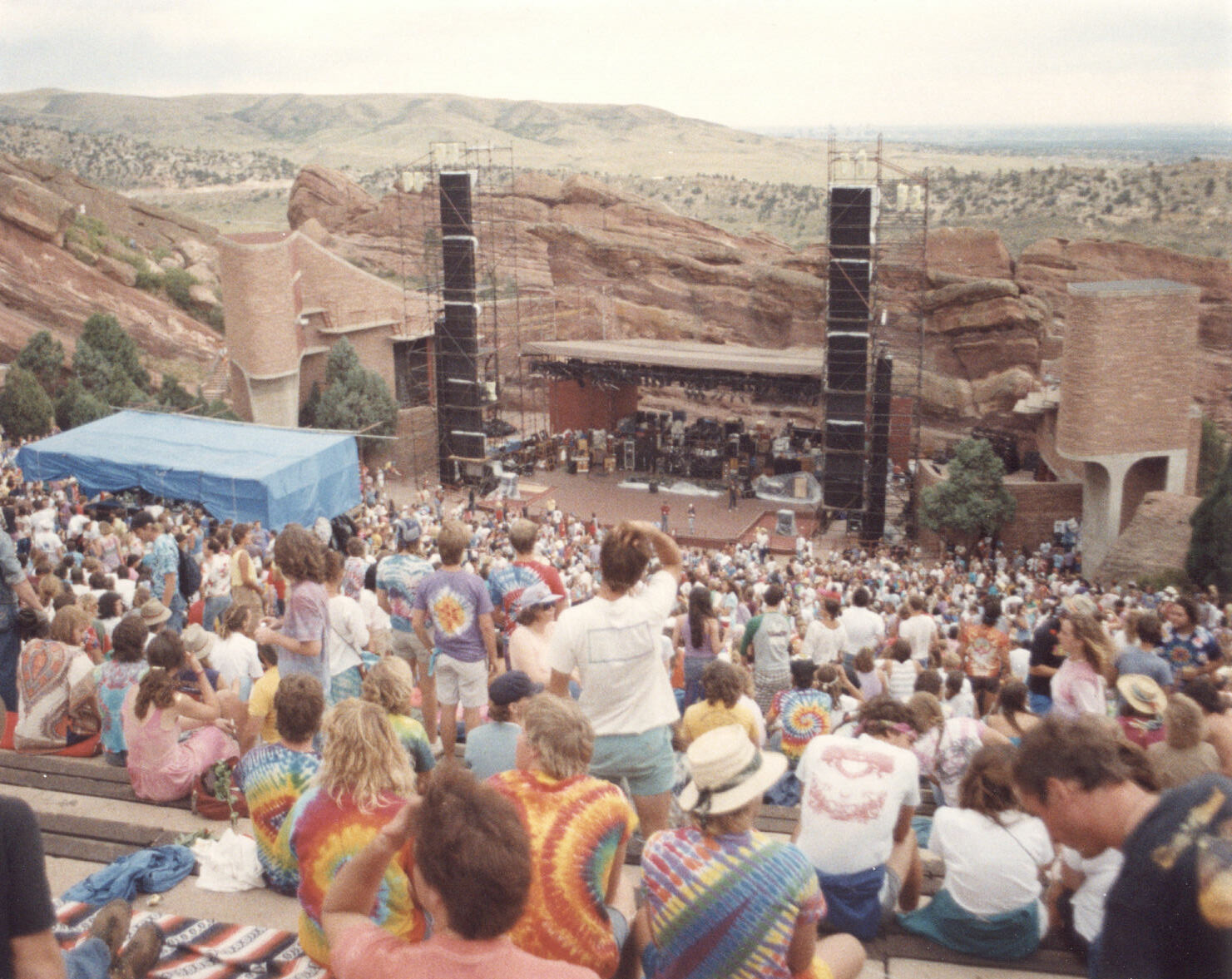
Fans attending a Grateful Dead concert at Red Rocks, Colorado, 1987

The Grateful Dead's appeal to fans was supported by the way the band structured their concerts and the use of the jam band format.

- From the early 1970s on, the Grateful Dead performed few shows with a predetermined setlist.
- At the behest of the band, a section of the audience was walled off to be used exclusively by fans recording the concert.
- From the 1980s on, the second set usually contained a prolonged percussion interlude, called "Drums" (and eventually incorporating electronic elements), by Mickey Hart and Bill Kreutzmann (also known as the "Rhythm Devils") followed by an extended improvisational jam, known as "Space", played by the rest of the band (as featured on the album Infrared Roses).

The band's extensive song catalog enabled them to create a varied "rotation" of setlists, which were never exactly the same for each performance ("show") throughout a tour. The use of these unique set rotations created two phenomena: The first had to do with Deadheads wanting to go to more shows in order to get a chance to hear their favorite song(s) – the same song was rarely played the same way twice during any given tour. Also, a great show often inspired many fans to begin following the band for the rest of the tour, as well as subsequent tours. The second was that having a large number of traveling fans had empowered the band to perform multiple shows at each venue, since they were assured that their performances would mostly sell out (almost all shows sold out from the mid-1980s and on). At this point, it became apparent that Deadheads were a major driving force that encouraged the band to keep going. Along with the large number of people attending several shows, a traveling community developed amongst fans in response to the familiarity of seeing the same people from previous strings of shows. As generations turned from the Acid Tests to the 1970s (and onward), tours became a time to revel with friends at concerts, old and new, who never knew the psychedelic age that spawned the band they loved. As with any large community, Deadheads developed their own idioms and slang.

== "The Vibe" ==
Some Deadheads use the term "X Factor" to describe the intangible element that elevates mere performance into something higher. Publicist and Jerry Garcia biographer Blair Jackson stated that "shows were the sacrament ... rich and full of blissful, transcendent musical moments that moved the body and enriched the soul." Phil Lesh himself comments on this phenomenon in his autobiography by saying, "The unique organicity of our music reflects the fact that each of us consciously personalized his playing: to fit with what others were playing and to fit with who each man was as an individual, allowing us to meld our consciousnesses together in the unity of a group mind."

Jackson takes this further, citing drummer Mickey Hart as saying, "The Grateful Dead weren't in the music business, they were in the transportation business." Jackson relates this to the Deadhead phenomenon directly by saying, "for many Deadheads, the band was a medium that facilitated experiencing other planes of consciousness and tapping into deep, spiritual wells that were usually the province of organized religion ... [they] got people high whether those people were on drugs or not."

Rock producer Bill Graham summarized much of the band's effect when he created a sign for the Grateful Dead when the group played the closing of the Winterland Ballroom on December 31, 1978. The sign read:

They're not the best at what they do,

They're the only ones that do what they do.

Cheers!

— Bill & the Winterland Gang

== Through the years ==
- 1960s – Before the term was invented, the Grateful Dead became one of the first cult acts in music. Although not as mainstream as other psychedelic bands, they were the leaders of the Haight-Ashbury music scene and had an intense following that started in San Francisco and eventually spread. Fans gathered at their jam concerts throughout the sixties.
- 1970s – essentially known as the "second generation of Deadheads", the new Deadheads of this time can either be traced to "an older sibling who had turned them on by spinning Workingman's Dead or Europe '72" or through college and university dorm rooms.
- 1980s – The early 1980s brought about what would later become known as "Shakedown Street" (in reference to the Grateful Dead album of the same name). Starting during the New Year's Eve shows at the Oakland Auditorium in California from 1979 to 1982, Deadheads began to realize they could sell their wares (anything from tie-dye T-shirts to veggie burritos) in order to follow the band around more. Also during the early 1980s, Deadhead tapers grew exponentially, resulting in the band designating a taping section in October 1984. With the success of their album In the Dark (and the single "Touch of Grey"), 1988 started the "Mega-Dead" period.
  - In the Darkers – also known as "Touchheads" (a reference of the album for the former and the single for the latter), these fans "dissed the fragile ecosystem" of a Grateful Dead show, in the words of Jackson. This led to "wiser" Deadheads, with the backing of the band, to mail SOSs and hand out show flyers telling people to "cool out".
  - Minglewood Town Council – this group was a direct result of the Touchheads and were a "tribal council" consisting of Deadheads and the Hog Farmers Calico and Goose. They handed out garbage bags at shows for people to pick up trash afterwards and tried to keep the masses mellow. The iconic lot leader, "Trash Captain" aka Douglas Seaton, was a well known member of this group.
- 1990s – The Deadheads of this time "tended to be young, white, male, and from middle-class backgrounds – in short, they were drawn from much the same demographic base as most rock fans." The band also tended to attract a large percentage of fans from high-income families. The main draw for these Deadheads to travel to shows seemed to be the sense of community and adventure. During the mid-1990s there were a series of small "Deadhead Riots" peaking with a large scale riot at the Deer Creek Music Center near Indianapolis in July 1995. The riot was triggered by several gate crashing incidents, and resulted in the fence at the venue being torn down by rioting Deadheads and the subsequent cancellation of the next day's show. The riot received national attention and is immortalized by Keller Williams in his song "Gatecrashers Suck", in which he calls the rioters "cock-sucking motherfuckers". Concert promoter Peter Shapiro filmed the iconic and influential The Grateful Dead and the Dead Heads: How the Fan Culture Evolved Deadhead documentary, "Tie-Died, Rock and Roll's Most Deadicated Fans" about life on Grateful Dead Tour 1994. The film was released through Sony Tri Star in September 1995 in major motion picture theaters across America, shortly after Jerry Garcia's death. At the premiere party of the film's release, Deadheads at the after-party at the Fillmore West met with Jerry Garcia's close friend and musician, David Nelson, to formulate a strategy for continuing Deadhead culture. Thus, the David Nelson Band was formed. Other Dead related jam bands also did their part to continue the culture.
- 21st century – Many Deadheads of all ages, including fans who were generally too young to have seen the Grateful Dead, continue to passionately follow the many current Grateful Dead cover bands and spin-off bands such as Dead & Company, The David Nelson Band, the Donna Jean Godchaux Band, RatDog, Phil Lesh and Friends, 7 Walkers, The Rhythm Devils, The Dead, Furthur, Dark Star Orchestra, and Joe Russo's Almost Dead.
- The Spinners – also known as "The Family" or Church of Unlimited Devotion. These people "used the band's music in worship services and were a constant presence at shows". They were called "spinners" because of their twirling dance style. John Perry Barlow stated at the 'So Many Roads Conference' that the Dead family hadn't realized at the time that the Spinners were a cult. Observers have reported seeing them spinning only to Jerry songs and sitting down at the songs Bobby performed. Allegations of abuse have circulated widely in Deadhead groups.
- Wharf Rats – Deadheads who helped each other remain drug and alcohol free while staying in the Dead scene. The Wharf Rats were named from the song of same title. They were allowed to set up a table at every concert to support Deadheads who believed in enjoying the Grateful Dead sober or needed more efforts to remain straight.

== Recordings of shows ==
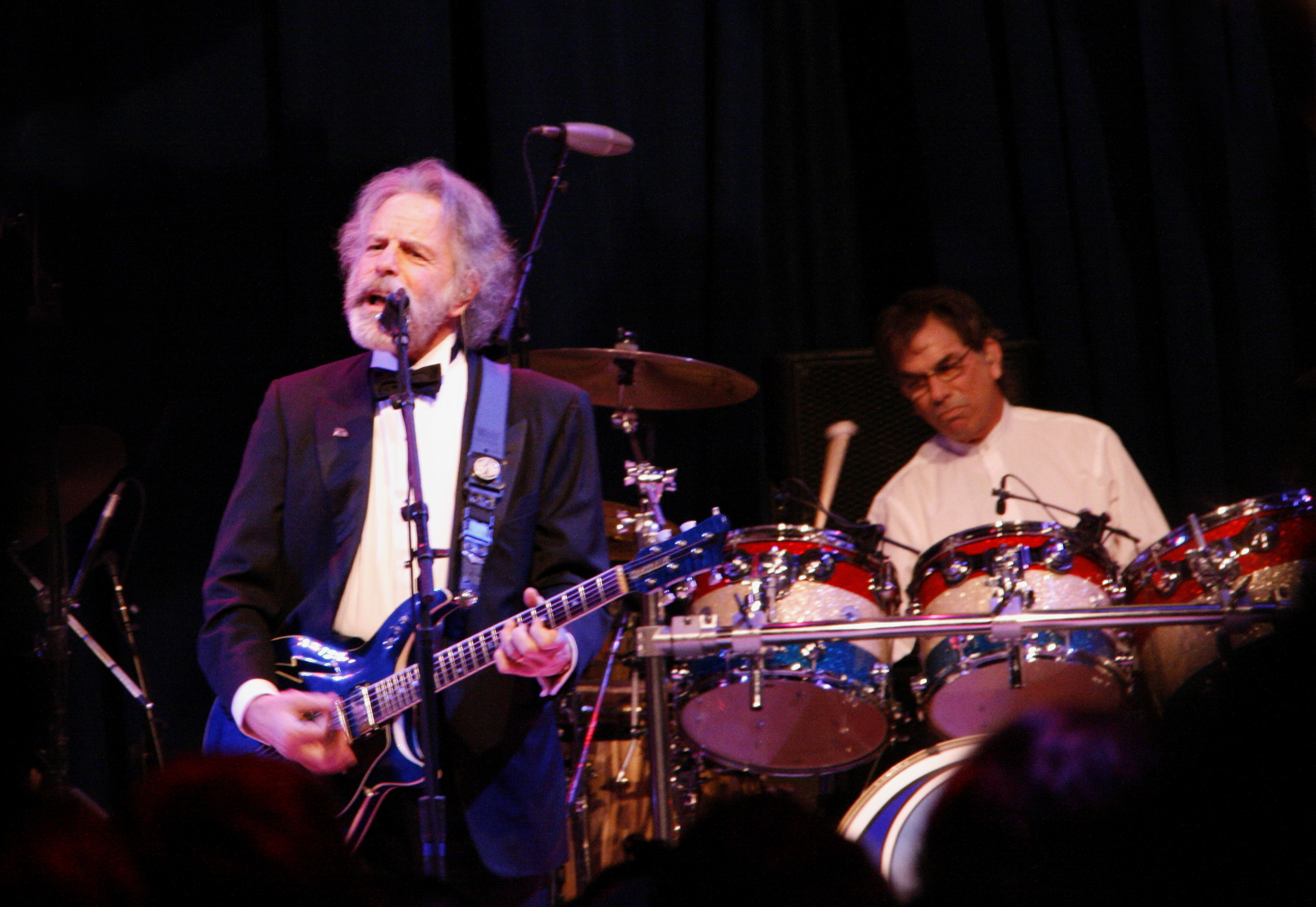
Bob Weir and Mickey Hart of the Grateful Dead performing on January 20, 2009, at the Mid-Atlantic Inaugural Ball during President Barack Obama's Inaugural

At almost every Grateful Dead show, it was common to see fans openly recording the music for later enjoyment. The tradition can be traced to 1966 with the number of tapers increasing yearly. In 1971, Les Kippel, from Brooklyn, New York, started the First Free Underground Grateful Dead Tape Exchange with the purpose of preserving the heritage of the Grateful Dead's concert history by exchanging copies of recorded tapes made from audience members. This started a new era in recording, collecting, and trading Grateful Dead tapes.

The "Tape Exchange" evolved into Dead Relix magazine, co-founded by Kippel and its first editor, Jerry Moore (1953–2009), a native of The Bronx, New York. First fliers were handed out at concerts in 1973, followed by a first issue in 1974. In 1974, Dead Relix evolved into Relix magazine and kept the Grateful Dead in the news while they took a year off in 1975. In 1980, Toni Brown became owner and publisher of Relix. In 2000, it was sold to Steve Bernstein. In 2009, Peter Shapiro bought Relix and still maintains ownership.

There were other Deadhead magazines that came about in the 1970s, notably, Dead in Words and In Concert. The 1980s saw the production of Terrapin Flyer, Dupree's Diamond News, Golden Road, and Acid. Dupree's Diamond News was distributed as an in-concert newsletter at several hundred Grateful Dead concerts, where it averaged 10,000 copies per run. Dupree's Diamond News was also distributed on a quarterly basis as a full-color, 72-page magazine to approximately 35,000 international subscriptions.

In 1998, Grateful Dead scholar Johnny Dwork, the founder of Terrapin Flyer and Dupree's Diamond News, published the award-winning, three-volume The Deadhead's Taping Compendium: A Guide to the Music of the Grateful Dead on Tape.

Fans were also known to record the many FM radio broadcast shows. Garcia looked kindly on tapers (he himself had been on several cross-country treks to record bluegrass music prior to the Grateful Dead), stating: "There's something to be said for being able to record an experience you've liked, or being to obtain a recording of it ... my responsibility to the notes is over after I've played them." In this respect, the Dead are considered by many to be the first "taper-friendly" band.

It is a matter of strict custom among Deadheads that these recordings are freely shared and circulated, with no money ever changing hands. Some bootleg recordings from unscrupulous bootleggers have turned up on the black market, but a general "code of honor specifically prohibited the buying and selling of Dead tapes". These recordings, sometimes called "liberated bootlegs", are still frowned upon by the community and that feeling "has spread into non–Grateful Dead taping circles".

Many Deadheads now freely distribute digital recordings of the band's live shows through the Internet Archive.

== Archives ==
Much Deadhead-related historical material received or collected by the band over the years is housed in the Grateful Dead Archive of UC-Santa Cruz. Archive curator Nicholas Meriwether, who has also written extensively about the culture and its impact on society, states "The Grateful Dead archive is going to end up being a critical way for us to approach and understand the 1960s and the counterculture of the era... It's also going to tell us a lot about the growth and development of modern rock theater, and it's helping us understand fan culture."

In addition to the band's collection, many longtime fans have also accrued a large collection of Grateful Dead memorabilia and recorded live performances.

== Famous Deadheads ==
The following celebrities have claimed to be Deadheads or have had media reported on them saying they are Deadheads:

- Trey Anastasio – rock musician, member of jam band Phish; saw his first Grateful Dead concert in 1980, and the band is a significant influence on him and his group Phish.
- Will Arnett, actor
- Steve Bannon, investor and political influencer
- John Belushi, actor; like many of the original Saturday Night Live cast, Belushi went from fan to friend of the band. Belushi's blues band, The Blues Brothers, even opened for the Dead, and Belushi joined the group in singing "U.S. Blues".
- Tony Blair, politician – played in "Mars Hotel"-inspired student band
- Jimmy Buffett, rock musician – recorded a version of "Scarlet Begonias" on the 2004 album "License to Chill"
- Joseph Campbell, literature professor – proclaimed Deadheads as "the world's newest tribe"
- Tucker Carlson, television personality
- Pete Carroll, American football coach
- Owen Chamberlain, physicist – claimed the Dead's drummers, known to fans as "Rhythm Devils", gave him "interesting ideas"
- Bill Clinton, 42nd President of the United States
- Andy Cohen, television personality
- Ann Coulter, journalist
- Elvis Costello, rock musician – a fan throughout the 1970s (including seeing them on the Europe '72 tour), Elvis later interviewed Jerry Garcia for the magazine Musician in which he effusively professed his admiration for the band. Costello contributed "Ship of Fools" to the Deadicated tribute album.
- Walter Cronkite, journalist – attended two Grateful Dead concerts and was a personal friend of Mickey Hart.
- Lila Downs, singer – dropped out of university in the late 1980s and lived about two years on the road following Grateful Dead tours.
- Faisal of Saudi Arabia, third king of Saudi Arabia; Blues for Allah was partially a tribute to him after his assassination in 1975
- Perry Farrell, Dave Navarro and other members of the rock band Jane's Addiction have spoken to their affection for the Dead in multiple interviews around the time of the Deadicated tribute album (to which they contributed a version of "Ripple" that incorporated parts of "Bird Song" and "The Other One") Farrell has spoken of admiring how they constructed their sets, stringing songs together.
- Al Franken, actor, commentator and politician
- Greg Ginn, guitarist and leader of punk rock group Black Flag.
- Whoopi Goldberg, actress, television personality – a fan of Grateful Dead music and personal friend of Mickey Hart.
- Mike Gordon, musician
- Al Gore, politician
- Tipper Gore, activist
- Fred Goss – actor, director, writer, and editor, who created the TV show Sons & Daughters in 2006 which adapted a Dead song for its theme music.
- Jerry Greenfield, co-creator of ice cream brand Ben & Jerry's
- Matt Groening, creator of The Simpsons
- Keith Haring, artist
- Phil Jackson, basketball coach
- Malcolm Jenkins, professional American football player
- Steve Jobs, co-creator of Apple Inc.
- Christopher Kimball, TV cooking show host – has a cover band Shady Grove
- Stephen King, author
- Ezra Koenig and Chris Tomson of Vampire Weekend
- Patrick Leahy, politician
- Steve Liesman, journalist – hosted 2015 pay-per-view of last shows from Chicago
- Mike Lookinland, actor
- Frank Marino, Canadian rock guitarist – has in interviews talked about his interest in classic San Francisco rock. He has referred to the music he and Mahogany Rush play as Grateful Dead jazz.
- George R.R. Martin, author
- John Mayer, musician – rediscovered the Grateful Dead's music while listening to Pandora Radio, later co-founded Dead & Company with former Dead members to play the band's music.
- David Murray, jazz saxophonist. Sat in with the Dead and Jerry Garcia on live concerts and recorded an album of Dead tunes, with Weir as a special guest.
- Laraine Newman, actress – along with many others from the original Saturday Night Live cast; has spoken about attending the closing of Winterland
- Adam Nimoy, documentarian; stated he spent the early 1970s as a Deadhead
- Larry Page, co-founder of Google
- Nancy Pelosi, politician
- Bob Pisani, journalist
- Jerome Powell, chair of the US Federal Reserve
- Lee Ranaldo, rock musician, Sonic Youth – has spoken of the Dead's influence (the Dead's "Feedback" jams of 1968 and 1969 being obvious precursors to Sonic Youth's own feedback forays). He appears in the documentary "The Other One" singing the band's praises.
- Harry Reid, politician
- Henry Rollins rock musician (Black Flag and Rollins Band) and actor.
- Adam Scott, actor and comedian
- Chloë Sevigny, actress
- Steve Silberman, journalist
- Mark Talbott, squash player
- Miles Teller, actor
- Patrick Volkerding, computer programmer
- Bill Walton, professional basketball player – known as "Grateful Red", he frequently included Dead references in interviews. Walton was a fan of the Dead since 1967, when he was a teenager, and he subsequently attended over 800 of their concerts during their career.
- Bill Weld, politician

== Deadhead Day ==
Deadhead Day is a globally celebrated holiday in honor of the Grateful Dead, the music they created and the culture of Deadhead fandom. Deadhead Day is celebrated each July 9 to commemorate the Grateful Dead's final concert performed at Soldier Field in Chicago, Illinois in 1995.

The holiday is an opportunity reach out to old friends, curate playlists to share and organize local meet-ups where fans can socialize with other Deadheads.

2023 was the inaugural year of the holiday.

== See also ==
- List of fandom names
- Grateful Dead Meet-Up at the Movies
- List of jam band music festivals
- Ecstatic dance
