= Wharf Rats =

Sober concert-goers

Wharf Rats are a group of concert-goers who have chosen to live drug and alcohol-free. They arose out of the environment around the rock group the Grateful Dead and their followers the Deadheads, both of which were rooted in the drug-embracing counterculture of the 1960s.

Their primary purpose is to support other concert goers who choose to live drug-free, like themselves. They announce their presence with yellow balloons, signs, and the Wharf Rats information table. At a set break during Grateful Dead (and related) concerts they hold self-help style meetings but are not affiliated specifically with any twelve-step organization and have no requirement for attendance at one of their meetings besides providing some helpful drug free fellowship. Like Deadheads, members of Wharf Rats come from all walks of life. By 1990, the Wharf Rats mailing list had some 3,000 names.

The Wharf Rats began during the early 1980s as a group of Deadheads under the name "The Wharf Rat Group of Alcoholics Anonymous". The Wharf Rats originally came from a small group of Narcotics Anonymous members who went to a Grateful Dead concert in Philadelphia and located each other by their yellow balloons with the NA symbol drawn on in Magic Marker. However due to operational differences they soon split off from Narcotics Anonymous, and are not affiliated with them, AA, or any other twelve-step program (though many of members of the Wharf Rats are members of AA, NA or other 12-step programs). The Wharf Rats see themselves as "a group of friends sharing a common bond, providing support, information and some traction in an otherwise slippery environment." The relationship between the Wharf Rats and more traditional such groups has been studied in the academic journal Deviant Behavior.

While the Wharf Rats originated at Grateful Dead concerts, they now have a presence at other concerts as well. Similar groups include The Phellowship for Phish, The Gateway for Widespread Panic, The Jellyfish for The String Cheese Incident, Much Obliged for Umphrey's McGee, Happy Hour Heroes for moe., the Digital Buddhas for The Disco Biscuits, Better Than Before for The Werks, the Hummingbirds for Bassnectar, and the Sunny Bunny Recovery for Ween, Dustie Baggies for Billy Strings and The Hot Tea Party for Goose—all based on the Wharf Rats, which remain the best-known.

The name of this group comes from the 1971 Dead song "Wharf Rat" (written by Jerry Garcia and Robert Hunter and appearing on Skull & Roses), which contains the self-told story of August West, a down-and-out dockside wino. By at least one interpretation, the song was aimed partly at Deadheads.
