= Grateful Dead Archive =

Archive at University of California, Santa Cruz, United States

Coordinates: 36°58′39.4″N 122°3′15.5″W

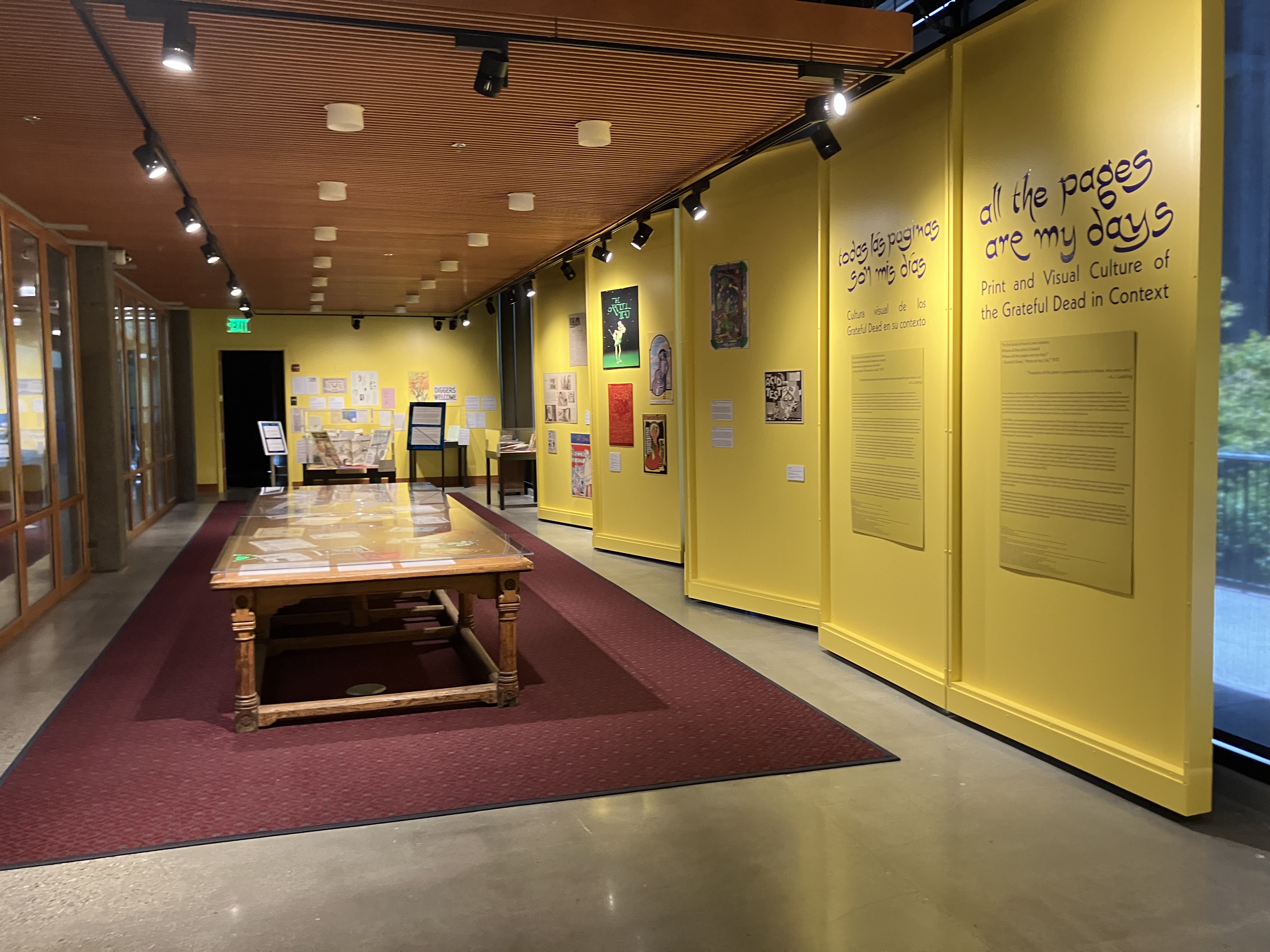
- The Grateful Dead Archive in 2025
- Location: University of California, Santa Cruz library's special collections, United States
- Type: Archive
- Established: 2008

Collection
- Items collected: Audio recordings, musical scores, programme notes, photographs, music scene publications
- Size: c. 650 items

Other information
- Website: gdao.org

The Grateful Dead Archive is an archive of materials related to music from The Grateful Dead. The archive was officially donated in April 2008, by band members Bob Weir and Mickey Hart.

The Archive contains material related to the individual members, its live performances, productions, and business. The materials span a three-decade career that ran from 1965 to 1995 and included numerous albums and thousands of live performances.

== Materials ==
- Documents
- Clippings
- Media
- Articles
- Memorabilia
- Artwork

Recordings date from 1965 to 1995.

== Access ==
=== Visit the Archive ===
Artifacts from the permanent collection and themed exhibits featuring selected works are displayed in the Brittingham Family Foundation's Dead Central Gallery on the second floor of McHenry Library at the University of California, Santa Cruz (UCSC). The Dead Central exhibit space is open during all library business hours and is subject to change during academic and intersessions. The collection can be browsed in UCSC Library Search. Electronic finding aids are available through the Online Archive of California. While advance notice is required to use some material, researchers are encouraged to contact Special Collections in advance for all the material they wish to see.

=== Grateful Dead Archive Online (GDAO) ===
The Grateful Dead Archive Online (GDAO) is a socially constructed collection of over 45,000 digitized items drawn from the UCSC Library's extensive Grateful Dead Archive (GDA) and from digital content submitted by the community and global network of Grateful Dead fans. Digitized content—including concert hotline recordings, decorated fan envelopes, fanzines, photographs, posters, radio interviews, tickets, T-shirts, and videos—can be found on the GDA), as well as web resources, such as David Dodd's "The Annotated Grateful Dead Lyrics" website and the fan recordings of concerts archived by the Internet Archive. These materials reflect the range of materials collected, managed, preserved and made available by the UCSC Library's Special Collections and Archives department to support teaching, learning and research.

== See also ==
- Grateful Dead
- Deadhead
- University of California, Santa Cruz
- McHenry Library
