= Taper (concert) =

Person who records audio concerts

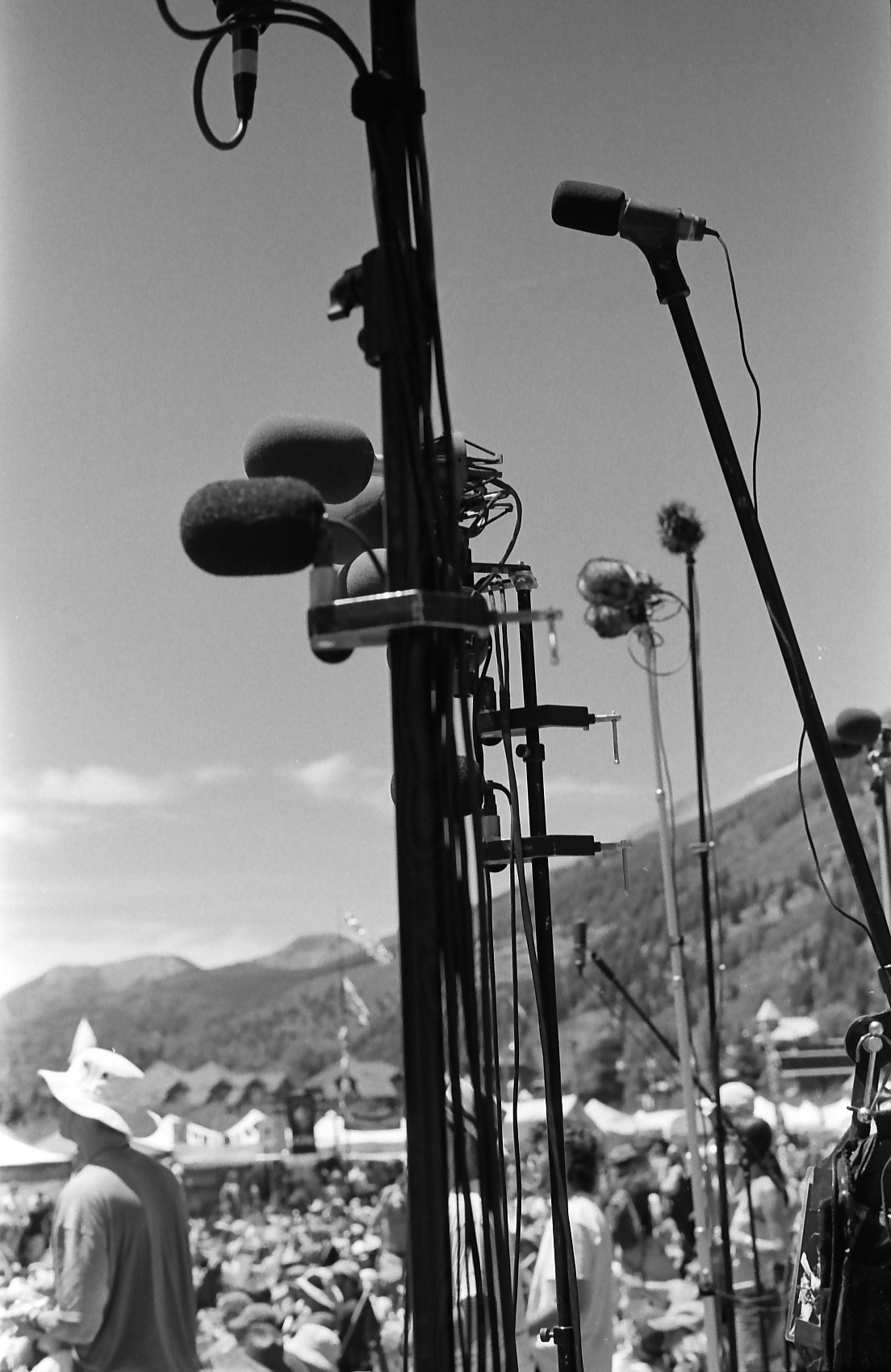
Taper section at Telluride Bluegrass Festival in June 2007.

A taper is a person who records musical events, often from standing microphones in the audience, for the benefit of the musical group's fanbase. Such taping was popularized in the late 1960s and early 1970s by fans of the Grateful Dead. Audio recording, while not officially allowed until the creation by the band of a "tapers' section" behind the soundboard in the mid-1980s, was generally tolerated at shows and fans would share their tapes through trade. Taping and trading became a Grateful Dead subculture.

Tapers generally do not financially profit from recording such concerts and record using their own equipment with permission from the artist. Taper recordings are commonly considered legal because the recordings are permitted and distribution is free. Taper etiquette strictly excludes bootlegging for profit. "Stealth taper" is a common term for a person who may furtively bring equipment into shows to record without explicit permission.

Although taping is usually done with microphones, often bands will allow plugging into the soundboard for a direct patch. Taping setups are generally portable, operating on high quality condenser microphones, phantom power, a microphone preamplifier and a recording device all of which are battery powered.

A common means of trade is by transferring the tape recording to a lossless digital format such as FLAC and sharing through an internet file share protocol such as BitTorrent with the assistance of a networking service such as etree.

== See also ==
- Cassette culture
- Tape trading
- Mixtape
