= Grateful Dead =

American rock band (1965–1995)

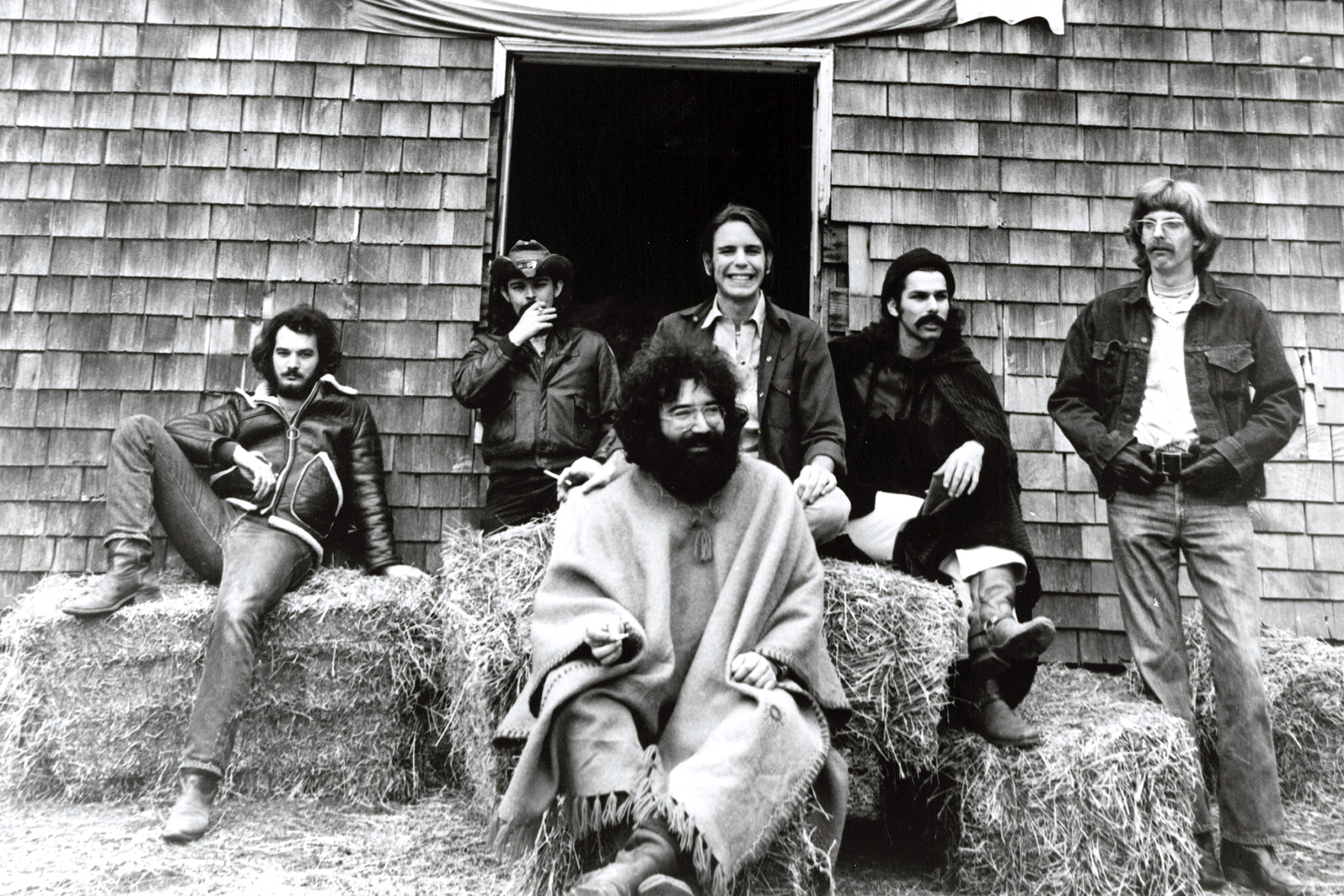
- The Grateful Dead in 1970. Left to right: Bill Kreutzmann, Ron "Pigpen" McKernan, Jerry Garcia, Bob Weir, Mickey Hart, and Phil Lesh.

Background information
- Also known as: The Warlocks (1965)
- Origin: Palo Alto, California, U.S.
- Genre: Rock
- Works: Discography; reunions
- Years active: 1965–1995
- Labels: Warner Bros.; Grateful Dead; Arista; Rhino; Sunflower; United Artists
- Spinoffs: The Other Ones; The Dead; Furthur; Dead & Company; New Riders of the Purple Sage; Old & In the Way; Legion of Mary; Reconstruction; Jerry Garcia Band; Jerry Garcia Acoustic Band; Kingfish; Bobby and the Midnites; RatDog; Wolf Bros; Phil Lesh and Friends; Rhythm Devils; Go Ahead; BK3; 7 Walkers; Billy & the Kids; Heart of Gold Band; Donna Jean Godchaux Band; Missing Man Formation
- Past members: Jerry Garcia; Bill Kreutzmann; Phil Lesh; Ron "Pigpen" McKernan; Bob Weir; Mickey Hart; Robert Hunter; Tom Constanten; John Perry Barlow; Keith Godchaux; Donna Jean Godchaux; Brent Mydland; Vince Welnick
- Website: dead.net

The Grateful Dead was an American rock band formed in Palo Alto, California, in 1965. They were known for their eclectic style which was influenced by elements of rock, blues, jazz, folk, country, bluegrass, rock and roll, gospel, reggae and world music. In their early years the band also introduced Space music psychedelia to their performances. The band became well known for their ability to improvise during their live performances. They are also known for their devoted fanbase known as "Deadheads". According to the musician and writer Lenny Kaye, the music of the Grateful Dead "touches on ground that most other groups don't even know exists". For the range of their influences and the structure of their live performances, the Grateful Dead are considered "the pioneering godfathers of the jam band world".

The Grateful Dead was founded in the San Francisco Bay Area during the rise of the counterculture of the 1960s. The band's founding members were Jerry Garcia (lead guitar and vocals), Bob Weir (rhythm guitar and vocals), Phil Lesh (bass guitar and vocals), Bill Kreutzmann (drums), and Ron "Pigpen" McKernan (keyboards, harmonica, and vocals). With the exception of Pigpen, who died in 1973, the remaining founding members stayed with the band until their 1995 split, with subsequent members being Mickey Hart (drums, 1967 to 1971 and 1974 to 1995), Robert Hunter (non-performing lyricist, 1967 to 1995), Tom Constanten (keyboards, 1968 to 1970), John Perry Barlow (non-performing lyricist, 1971 to 1995), Keith Godchaux (keyboards and vocals, 1971 to 1979), Donna Godchaux (vocals, 1972 to 1979), Brent Mydland (keyboards and vocals, 1979 to his death in 1990), and Vince Welnick (keyboards and vocals, 1990 to 1995).

Following Garcia's death in August 1995, the remaining members decided to disband the Grateful Dead. Former band members, along with other musicians, toured as the Other Ones in 1998, 2000, and 2002, and as the Dead in 2003, 2004, and 2009. In 2015, Weir, Lesh, Kreutzmann, and Hart marked the band's 50th anniversary in a series of concerts in Santa Clara, California, and Chicago that were billed as their last performances together. There have also been several spin-offs featuring one or more core members, such as Dead & Company, Furthur, the Rhythm Devils, Phil Lesh and Friends, RatDog, and Billy & the Kids.

Despite having only one Top-40 single in their 30-year career, "Touch of Grey" (1987), the Grateful Dead remained among the highest-grossing American touring acts for decades. They gained a committed fanbase by word of mouth and through the free exchange of their live recordings, encouraged by the band's allowance of taping. In 2024, they broke the record for most Top-40 albums on the Billboard 200 chart. Rolling Stone ranked the Grateful Dead number 57 on its 2011 list of the "100 Greatest Artists of All Time". The band was inducted into the Rock and Roll Hall of Fame in 1994, and a recording of their May 8, 1977, performance at Cornell University's Barton Hall was added to the National Recording Registry of the Library of Congress in 2012 for being "culturally, historically, or aesthetically significant". In 2024, Weir, Lesh, Kreutzmann, and Hart were recognized as part of the Kennedy Center Honors.

== Formation (1965–1966) ==
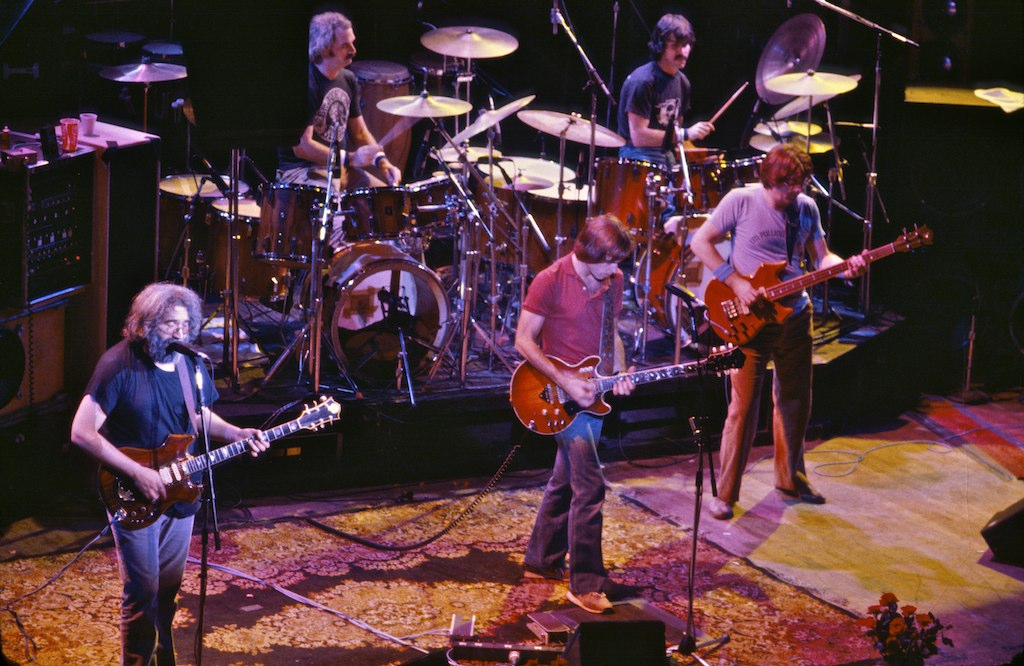
Grateful Dead at Warfield Theatre in 1980. Left to right: Jerry Garcia, Bill Kreutzmann, Bob Weir, Mickey Hart, Phil Lesh. Not pictured: Brent Mydland.

The Grateful Dead began their career as the Warlocks, a group formed in early 1965 from the remnants of a Palo Alto, California, jug band called Mother McCree's Uptown Jug Champions and members of the Wildwood Boys (Jerry Garcia, Ron "Pigpen" McKernan, David Nelson, Robert Hunter, and Norm Van Maastricht). As the Wildwood Boys they played regularly at The Tangent, a folk music coffeehouse operated by Stanford Medical Center doctors Stuart "Stu" Goldstein and David "Dave" Shoenstadt on University Avenue in Palo Alto (1963). As the Warlocks, the band's first show was at Magoo's Pizza Parlor, at 639 Santa Cruz Avenue in suburban Menlo Park, on May 5, 1965, now a cocktail bar. The band continued playing bar shows, like Frenchy's Bikini-A-Go-Go in Hayward and, importantly, five sets a night, five nights a week, for six weeks, at the In Room in Belmont as the Warlocks, but quickly changed the band's name after finding out that a different band known as the Warlocks had put out a record under that name. (The Velvet Underground also had to change its name from the Warlocks.)

The name "Grateful Dead" was chosen from a dictionary. According to Lesh, Garcia "picked up an old Britannica World Language Dictionary ... [and] ... In that silvery elf-voice he said to me, 'Hey, man, how about the Grateful Dead?'" The definition there was "the soul of a dead person, or his angel, showing gratitude to someone who, as an act of charity, arranged their burial." According to Alan Trist, director of the Grateful Dead's music publisher company Ice Nine, Garcia found the name in the Funk & Wagnalls Folklore Dictionary, when his finger landed on that phrase while playing a game of Fictionary. In the Garcia biography Captain Trips, author Sandy Troy states that the band was smoking the psychedelic DMT at the time. The motif of the "grateful dead" appears in folktales from a variety of cultures.

The first show under the name Grateful Dead was in San Jose on December 4, 1965, at one of Ken Kesey's Acid Tests. Scholar Michael Kaler has written that the Dead's participation in the Acid Tests was crucial both to the development of their improvisational vocabulary and to their bonding as a band, with the group having set out to foster an intra-band musical telepathy. Kaler has further pointed out that the Dead's pursuit of a new improvisatory rock language in 1965 chronologically coincided with that same goal's adoption by Jefferson Airplane, Pink Floyd and the Velvet Underground.

Earlier demo tapes have survived, but the first of over 2,000 concerts known to have been recorded by the band's fans was a show at the Fillmore Auditorium in San Francisco on January 8, 1966. Later that month, the Grateful Dead played at the Trips Festival, a three-day psychedelic rock weekend party and event produced by Kesey, Stewart Brand, and Ramon Sender, that, in conjunction with the Merry Pranksters, brought the nascent hippie movement together for the first time.

Other supporting personnel who joined early included Rock Scully, who heard of the band from Kesey and signed on as manager after meeting them at the Big Beat Acid Test; Stewart Brand, "with his side show of taped music and slides of Indian life, a multimedia presentation" at the Big Beat and then, expanded, at the Trips Festival; and Owsley Stanley, the "Acid King" whose LSD supplied the Acid Tests and who, in early 1966, became the band's financial backer, renting them a house on the fringes of Watts, Los Angeles, and buying them sound equipment. "We were living solely off of Owsley's good graces at that time. ... [His] trip was he wanted to design equipment for us, and we were going to have to be in sort of a lab situation for him to do it", said Garcia.

== Main career (1967–1995) ==
=== Pigpen era (1967–1972) ===
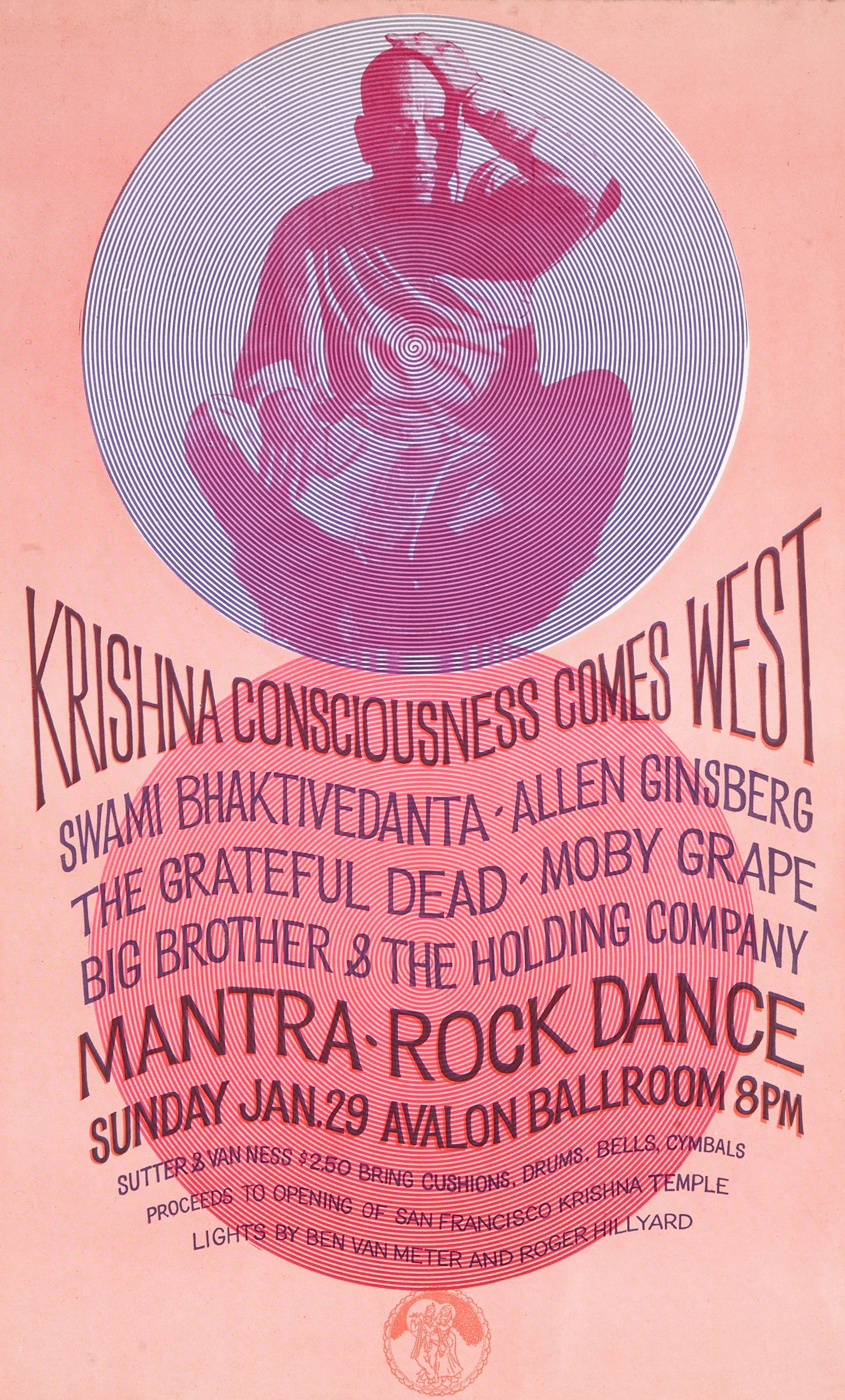
The Mantra-Rock Dance promotional poster, published in 1967, featuring Grateful Dead

One of the group's earliest major performances in 1967 was the Mantra-Rock Dance, a musical event held on January 29, 1967, at the Avalon Ballroom by the San Francisco Hare Krishna temple. The Grateful Dead performed at the event along with the Hare Krishna founder Bhaktivedanta Swami, poet Allen Ginsberg, bands Moby Grape and Big Brother and the Holding Company with Janis Joplin, donating proceeds to the temple. The band's first LP, The Grateful Dead, was released on Warner Brothers in 1967.

Classically trained trumpeter Phil Lesh performed on bass guitar. Bob Weir, the youngest original member of the group, played rhythm guitar. Ron "Pigpen" McKernan played keyboards, percussion, and harmonica until shortly before his death in 1973 at the age of 27. Garcia, Weir, and McKernan shared the lead vocal duties more or less equally; Lesh sang only a few leads, but his tenor was a key part of the band's three-part vocal harmonies. Bill Kreutzmann played drums, and in September 1967 was joined by a second drummer, New York City native Mickey Hart, who also played a wide variety of other percussion instruments.

On May 3, 1968, the band played a free concert at Columbia University during the anti–Vietnam War student protests during which students occupied several campus buildings. In order to play, the band, equipment and all, had to be "smuggled" on campus in the back of a bread delivery truck. "We were already jamming away before the security and police could stop us", said Hart.

Tom "TC" Constanten was added as a second keyboardist from 1968 to 1970, to help Pigpen keep up with an increasingly psychedelic sound, while Pigpen transitioned into playing various percussion instruments and vocals. 1970 included tour dates in New Orleans, where the band performed at The Warehouse for two nights. On January 31, 1970, the local police raided their hotel on Bourbon Street and arrested and charged 19 people with possession of various drugs. The second night's concert was performed as scheduled after bail was posted. Eventually, the charges were dismissed, except those against sound engineer Owsley Stanley, who was already facing charges in California for manufacturing LSD. This event was later memorialized in the lyrics of "Truckin'", a single from American Beauty that reached number 64 on the charts.

Hart took time off from the band in February 1971, after his father, an accountant, absconded with much of the band's money; Kreutzmann was once again the sole percussionist, until Hart rejoined the Grateful Dead for good in October 1974. After Constanten's departure, Pigpen reclaimed his position as sole keyboardist. Less than a year later, in late 1971, Pigpen was joined by another keyboardist, Keith Godchaux, who played grand piano alongside Pigpen's Hammond B-3 organ. In early 1972, Keith's wife, Donna Jean Godchaux, joined the Grateful Dead as a backing vocalist.

Following the Grateful Dead's "Europe '72" tour, Pigpen's health had deteriorated to the point that he could no longer tour with the band. His final concert appearance was June 17, 1972, at the Hollywood Bowl, in Los Angeles; he died on March 8, 1973, of complications from liver damage.

=== Godchaux era (1972–1979) ===
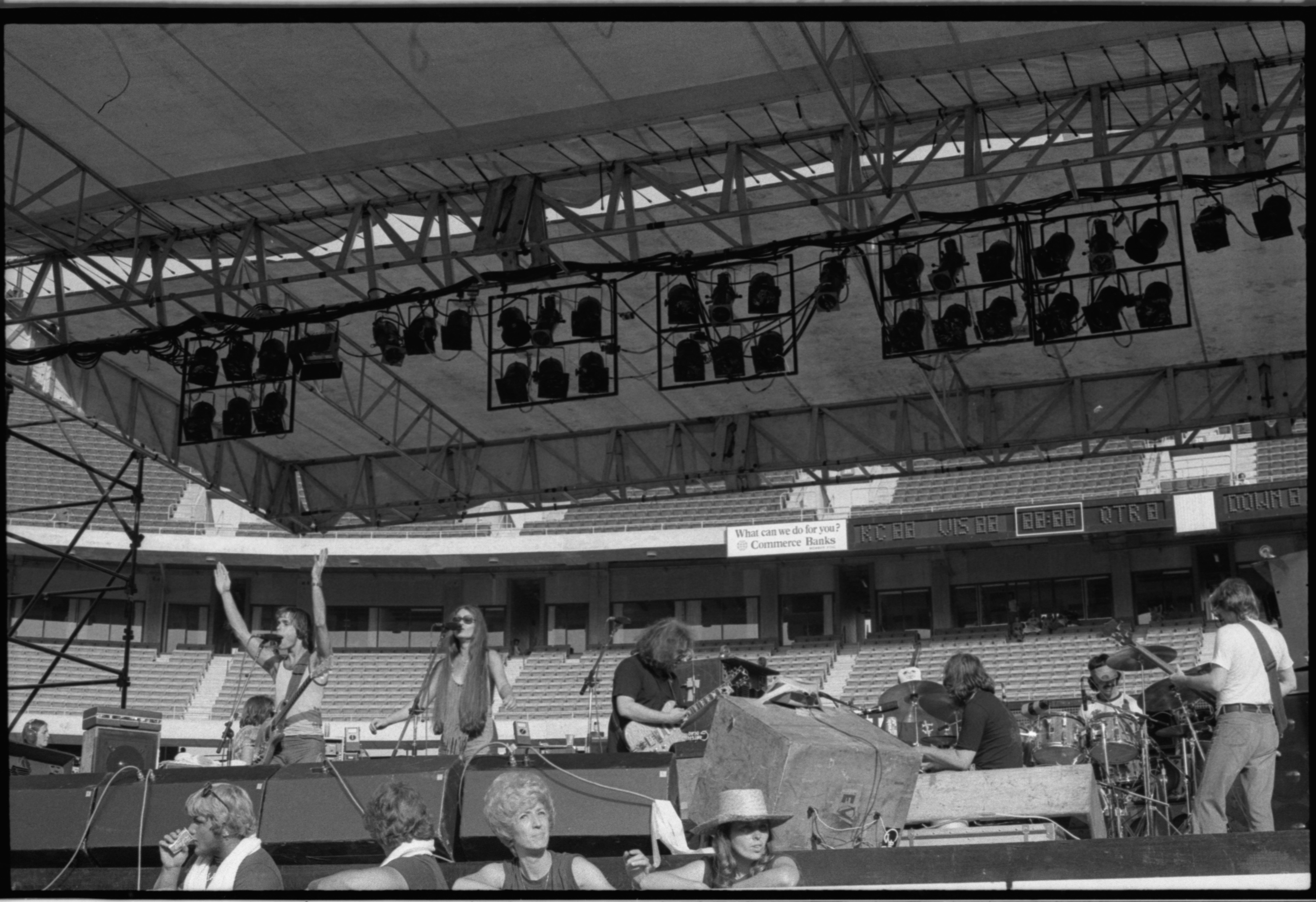
Grateful Dead at Arrowhead Stadium in July 1978

Pigpen's death did not slow down the Grateful Dead. With the help of manager Ron Rakow, the band soon formed its own record label, Grateful Dead Records. Later that year, it released its next studio album, the jazz-influenced Wake of the Flood, which became their biggest commercial success thus far. Meanwhile, capitalizing on the album's success, the band soon went back to the studio, and in June 1974 released another album, From the Mars Hotel. Not long after, the Dead decided to take a hiatus from live touring. The band travelled to Europe for a string of shows in September 1974, before performing a series of five concerts at the Winterland Ballroom in San Francisco in October 1974, and delved into various other projects. The Winterland concerts were filmed, and Garcia compiled the footage into The Grateful Dead Movie, a feature-length concert film released in 1977.

In September 1975, the Dead released their eighth studio album, Blues for Allah. The band resumed touring in June 1976, playing multiple dates in small theaters, rather than the stadium shows that had become common, and had exhausted them, in 1974. That same year, they signed with Arista Records, and the new contract produced Terrapin Station in July 1977. The band's tour in the spring of that year is held in high regard by its fans, and its concert of May 8 at Cornell University is often considered one of the best performances of its career. Their September 1977 concert at Raceway Park in Old Bridge Township, New Jersey was attended by 107,019 people and held the record for largest-ticketed concert in the United States by a single act for 47 years.

Keith and Donna Jean Godchaux left the band in February 1979, citing artistic differences.

=== Mydland/Welnick era (1979–1995) ===
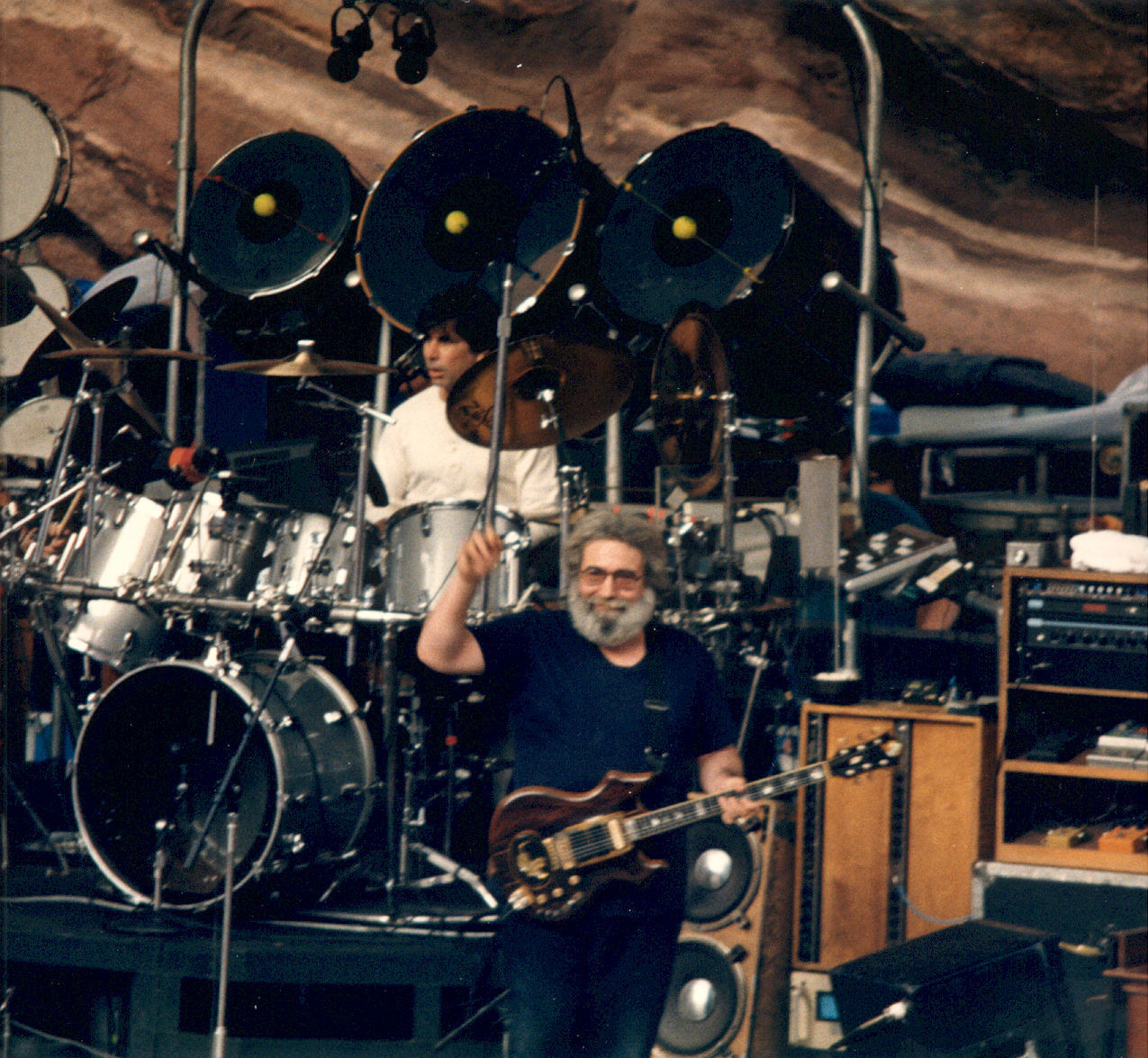
Grateful Dead performing at Red Rocks Amphitheatre in 1987

Following the Godchauxs' departure, Brent Mydland joined as keyboardist and vocalist and was considered "the perfect fit". The Godchauxs then formed the Heart of Gold Band, before Keith died in a car accident in July 1980. Mydland was the keyboardist for the Grateful Dead for 11 years until his death by narcotics overdose in July 1990, becoming the third keyboardist to die.

Shortly after Mydland found his place in the early 1980s, Garcia's health began to decline. He became a frequent smoker of "Persian", a type of heroin, and he gained weight at a rapid pace. He lost his liveliness on stage, his voice was strained, and Deadheads worried for his health. After he began to curtail his opiate usage gradually in 1985, Garcia slipped into a diabetic coma for several days in July 1986, leading to the cancelation of all concerts in the fall of that year. Garcia recovered, and the band released In the Dark in July 1987, which became its best-selling studio album and produced its only top-40 single, "Touch of Grey". Also, that year, the group toured with Bob Dylan, as heard on the album Dylan & the Dead.

Mydland died in July 1990 and Vince Welnick, former keyboardist for the Tubes, joined as a band member, while Bruce Hornsby, who had a successful career with his band the Range, joined temporarily as a bridge to help Welnick learn songs. Both performed on keyboards and vocals—Welnick until the band's end, and Hornsby mainly from 1990 to 1992.

Saxophonist Branford Marsalis played five concerts with the band between 1990 and 1994.

The Grateful Dead performed its final concert on July 9, 1995, at Soldier Field in Chicago.

== Aftermath (1995–present) ==
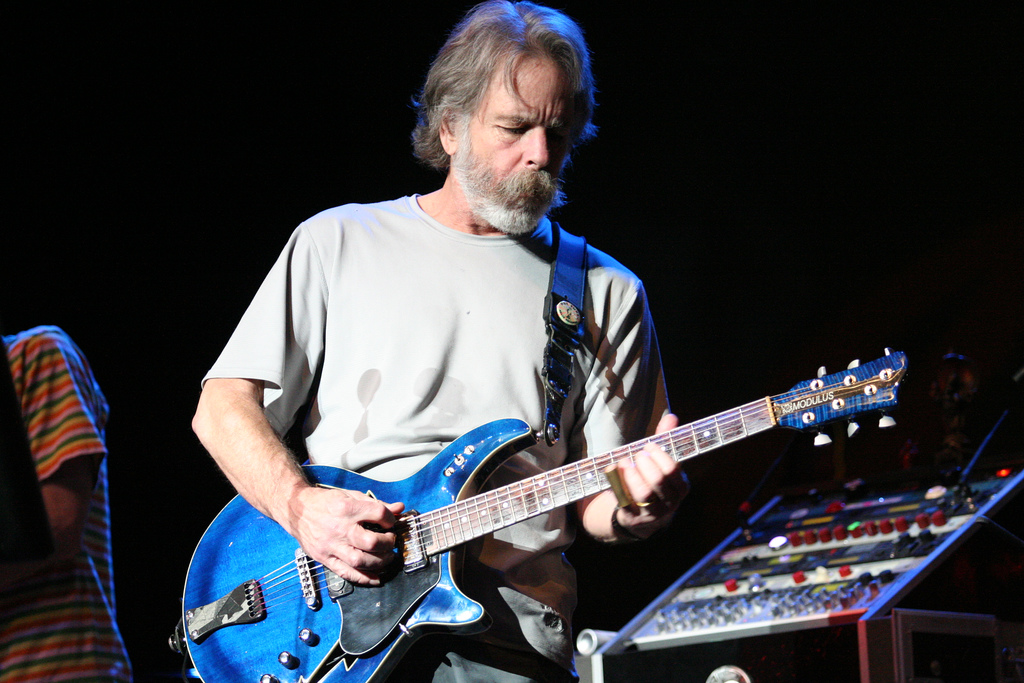
Bob Weir playing his Modulus G3FH guitar in 2007

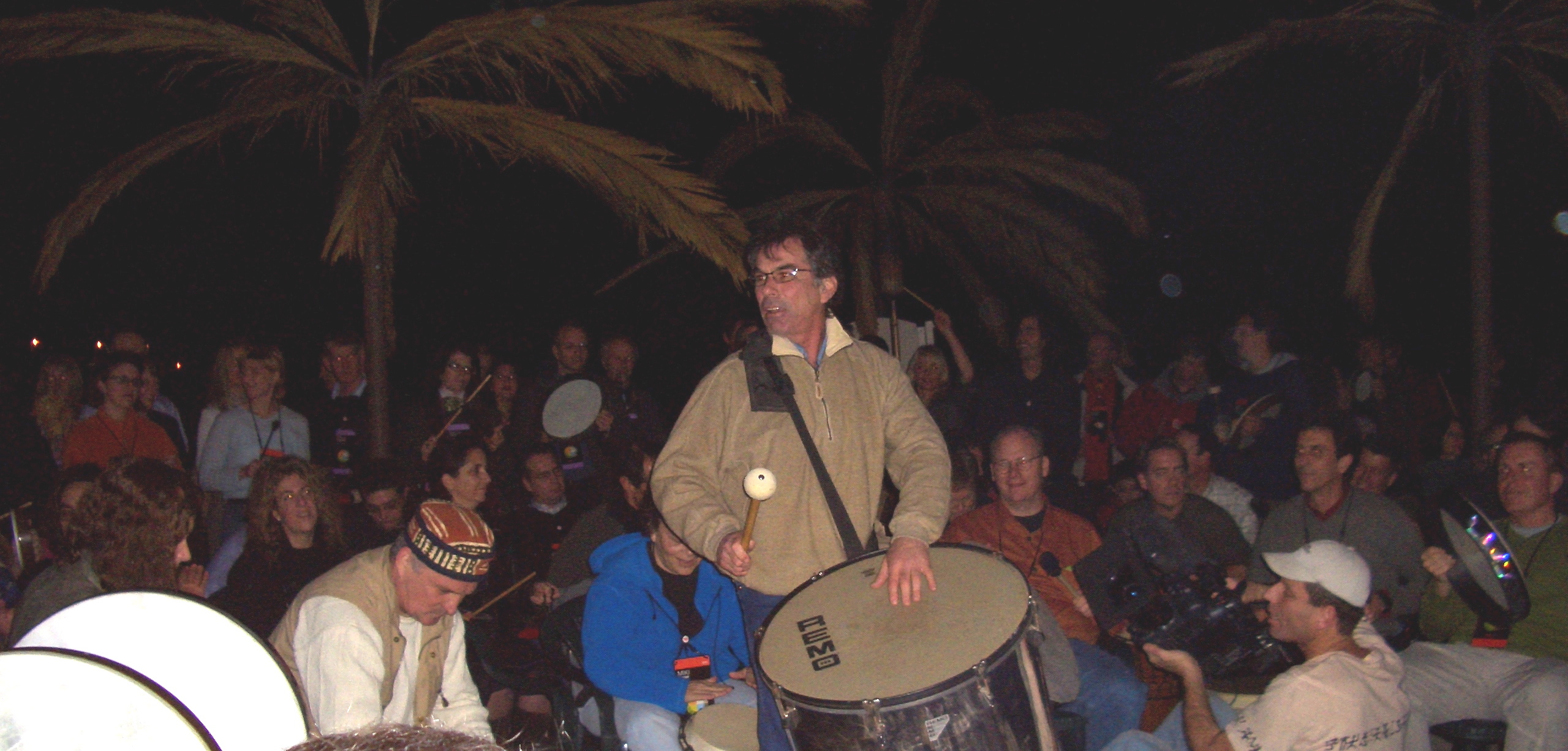
Mickey Hart leading a drum circle in February 2005

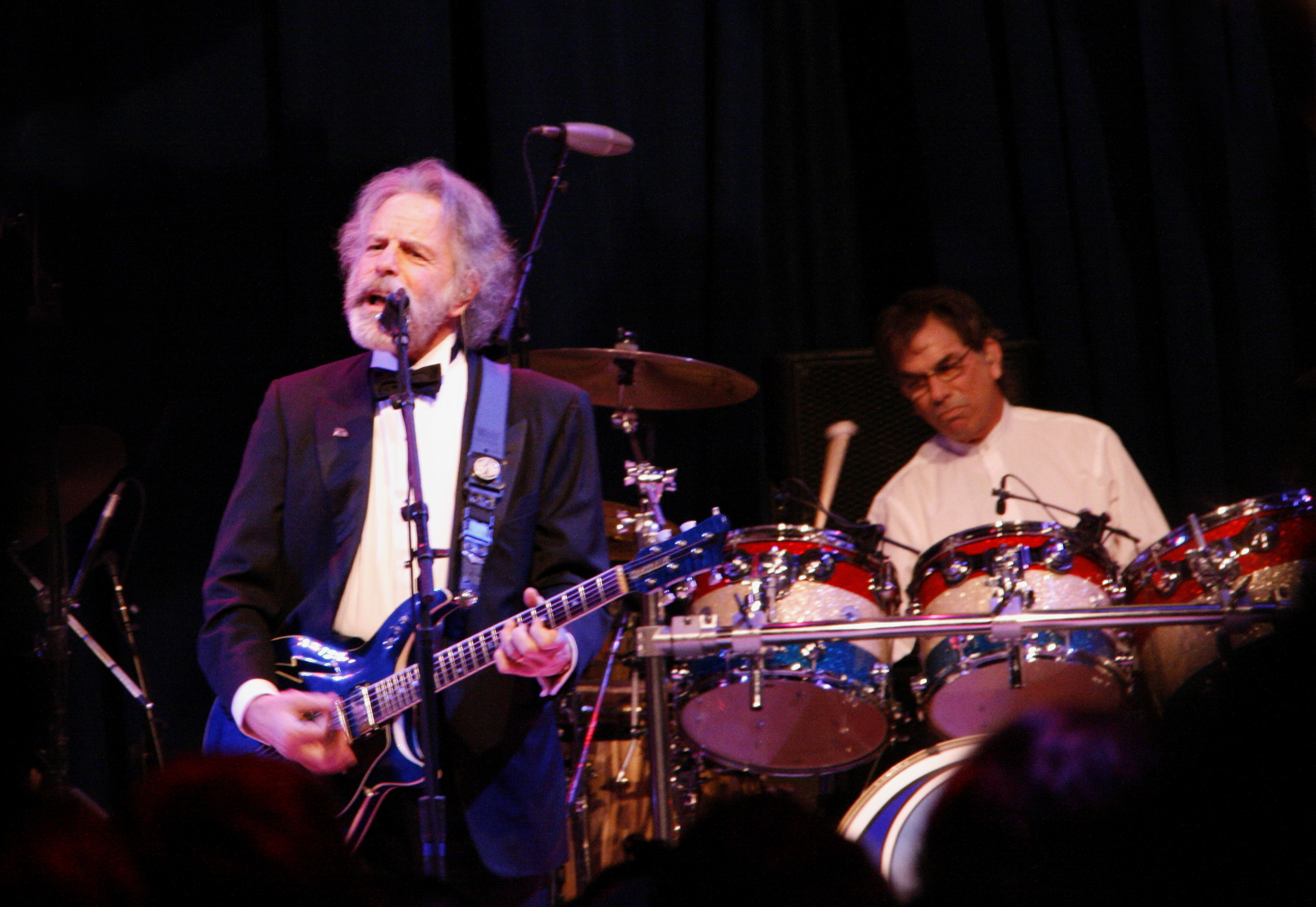
Bob Weir and Mickey Hart performing at the 2009 Mid-Atlantic Inaugural Ball during the Obama Inaugural in January 2009

Jerry Garcia died on August 9, 1995. A few months after Garcia's death, the remaining members of the Grateful Dead decided to disband. Since that time, there have been a number of reunions by the surviving members involving various combinations of musicians. Additionally, the former members have also begun or continued individual projects.

In 1998, Bob Weir, Phil Lesh, and Mickey Hart, along with several other musicians, formed a band called the Other Ones, and performed a number of concerts that year, releasing a live album, The Strange Remain, the following year. In 2000, the Other Ones toured again, this time with Kreutzmann but without Lesh. After taking another year off, the band toured again in 2002 with Lesh. That year, the Other Ones then included all four living former Grateful Dead members who had been in the band for most or all of its history. At different times the shifting lineup of the Other Ones also included guitarists Mark Karan, Steve Kimock, and Jimmy Herring, keyboardists Bruce Hornsby, Jeff Chimenti, and Rob Barraco, saxophonist Dave Ellis, drummer John Molo, bassist Alphonso Johnson, and vocalist Susan Tedeschi.

In 2003, the Other Ones, still including Weir, Lesh, Hart, and Kreutzmann, changed their name to the Dead. The Dead toured the United States in 2003, 2004 and 2009. The band's lineups included Jimmy Herring and Warren Haynes on guitar, Jeff Chimenti and Rob Barraco on keyboards, and Joan Osborne on vocals. In 2008, members of the Dead played two concerts, called "Deadheads for Obama" and "Change Rocks".

Following the 2009 Dead tour, Lesh and Weir formed the band Furthur, which debuted in September 2009. Joining Lesh and Weir in Furthur were Chimenti (keyboards), John Kadlecik (guitar), Joe Russo (drums), Jay Lane (drums), Sunshine Becker (vocals), and Zoe Ellis (vocals). Lane and Ellis left the band in 2010, and vocalist Jeff Pehrson joined later that year. Furthur disbanded in 2014.

In 2010, Hart and Kreutzmann re-formed the Rhythm Devils, and played a summer concert tour. In the fall of 2015, Hart, Kreutzmann and Weir teamed up with Chimenti, guitarist John Mayer, and bassist Oteil Burbridge to form a band called Dead & Company. Mayer recounted that in 2011 he was listening to Pandora and happened upon the Grateful Dead song "Althea", and that soon Grateful Dead music was all he would listen to. Dead & Company toured every year (except 2020), until announcing that their summer 2023 tour, which saw Kreutzmann replaced by Lane, would be their last. However, they later clarified that it was only their last tour, and they continued to perform concerts. The last Dead & Company shows featuring Weir were performed in August 2025, celebrating 60 years of the Grateful Dead. The band's future without Weir remains uncertain.

Since 1995, the former members of the Grateful Dead have also pursued solo music careers. Both Bob Weir & RatDog and Phil Lesh and Friends have performed many concerts and released several albums. Mickey Hart and Bill Kreutzmann have also each released a few albums. Hart has toured with his world music percussion ensemble Planet Drum as well as the Mickey Hart Band. Kreutzmann has led several different bands, including BK3, 7 Walkers (with Papa Mali), and Billy & the Kids. Donna Godchaux has returned to the music scene, with the Donna Jean Godchaux Band, and Tom Constanten also continues to write and perform music. All of these groups continue to play Grateful Dead music.

In May 2017, a four-hour documentary film Long Strange Trip about the band was released theatrically and on Amazon Prime. Directed by Amir Bar-Lev and produced by Martin Scorsese and Justin Kreutzmann, while David Lemieux supervised the musical selection. Importantly, Weir, Hart, Kreutzmann, and Lesh agreed to new interviews for the film.

Barlow died in 2018 and Hunter in 2019. Lesh died in 2024. Donna Jean Godchaux died in November 2025. Weir died in January 2026, leaving Kreutzmann as the last surviving member of the Grateful Dead's original lineup.

=== "Fare Thee Well" ===
In 2015, Weir, Lesh, Kreutzmann, and Hart reunited for five concerts called "Fare Thee Well: Celebrating 50 Years of the Grateful Dead". The shows were performed on June 27 and 28 at Levi's Stadium in Santa Clara, California, and on July 3, 4 and 5 at Soldier Field in Chicago. The band stated that this would be the final time that Weir, Lesh, Hart, and Kreutzmann would perform together. They were joined by Trey Anastasio of Phish on guitar, Jeff Chimenti on keyboards, and Bruce Hornsby on piano. Demand for tickets was very high. The concerts were simulcast via various media. The Chicago shows have been released as a box set of CDs and DVDs.

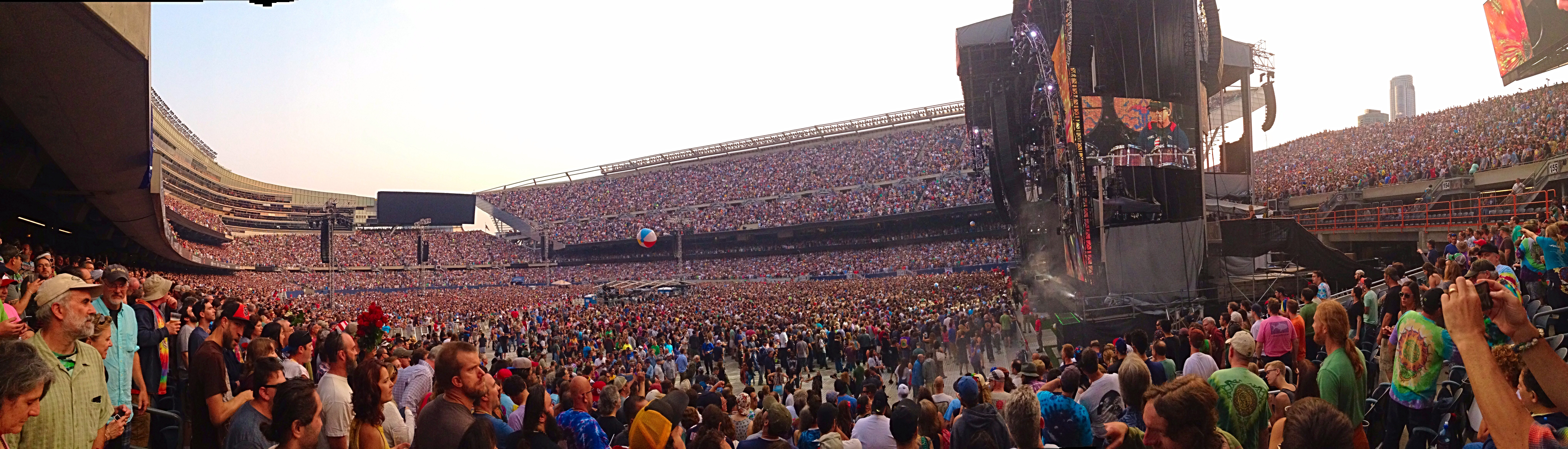
The Fare Thee Well concert at Soldier Field in Chicago on July 5, 2015

== Musical style ==
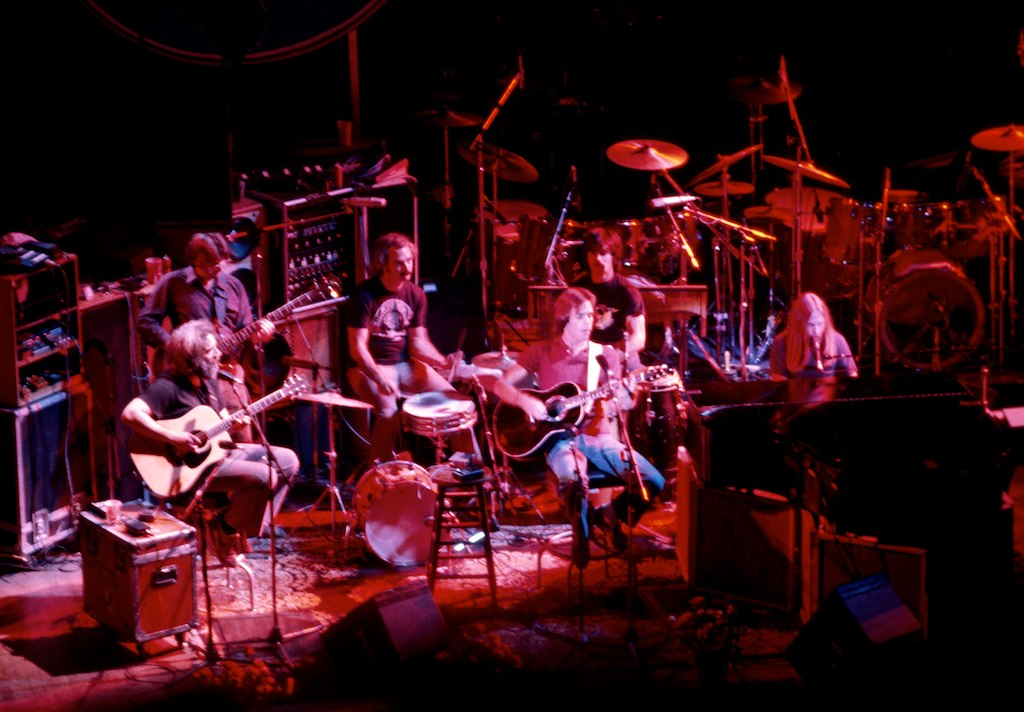
An acoustic performance at the Warfield Theatre in San Francisco in 1980. Left to right: Garcia, Lesh, Kreutzmann, Weir, Hart, Mydland.

The Grateful Dead formed during the era when bands such as the Beatles, the Beach Boys and the Rolling Stones were dominating the airwaves. "The Beatles were why we turned from a jug band into a rock 'n' roll band", said Bob Weir. "What we saw them doing was impossibly attractive. I couldn't think of anything else more worth doing." Former folk-scene star Bob Dylan had recently put out a couple of records featuring electric instrumentation. Grateful Dead members have said that it was after attending a concert by the touring New York City band the Lovin' Spoonful that they decided to "go electric" and look for a "dirtier" sound. Jerry Garcia and Bob Weir (both of whom had been immersed in the American folk music revival of the late 1950s and early 1960s), were open-minded about the use of electric guitars.

The Grateful Dead's early music (in the mid-1960s) was part of the process of establishing what "psychedelic music" was, but theirs was essentially a "street party" form of it. They developed their "psychedelic" playing as a result of meeting Ken Kesey in Palo Alto, California, and subsequently becoming the house band for the Acid Tests he staged. They did not fit their music to an established category such as pop rock, blues, folk rock, or country & western. Individual tunes within their repertoire could be identified under one of these stylistic labels, but overall their music drew on all of these genres and, more frequently, melded several of them. Bill Graham said of the Grateful Dead, "They're not the best at what they do, they're the only ones that do what they do." Academics Paul Hegarty and Martin Halliwell argued that the Grateful Dead were "not merely as precursors of prog but as essential developments of progressiveness in its early days". Often (both in performance and on recording) the Dead left room for exploratory, spacey soundscapes.

Their live shows, fed by an improvisational approach to music, were different from most touring bands. While rock and roll bands often rehearse a standard set, played with minor variations, the Grateful Dead did not prepare in this way. Garcia stated in a 1966 interview, "We don't make up our sets beforehand. We'd rather work off the tops of our heads than off a piece of paper." They maintained this approach throughout their career. For each performance, the band drew material from an active list of a hundred or so songs.

The 1969 live album Live/Dead did capture the band in-form, but commercial success did not come until Workingman's Dead and American Beauty, both released in 1970. These records largely featured the band's laid-back acoustic musicianship and more traditional song structures. With their rootsy, eclectic stylings, particularly evident on the latter two albums, the band pioneered the hybrid Americana genre.

=== Instrumentation and musicianship ===
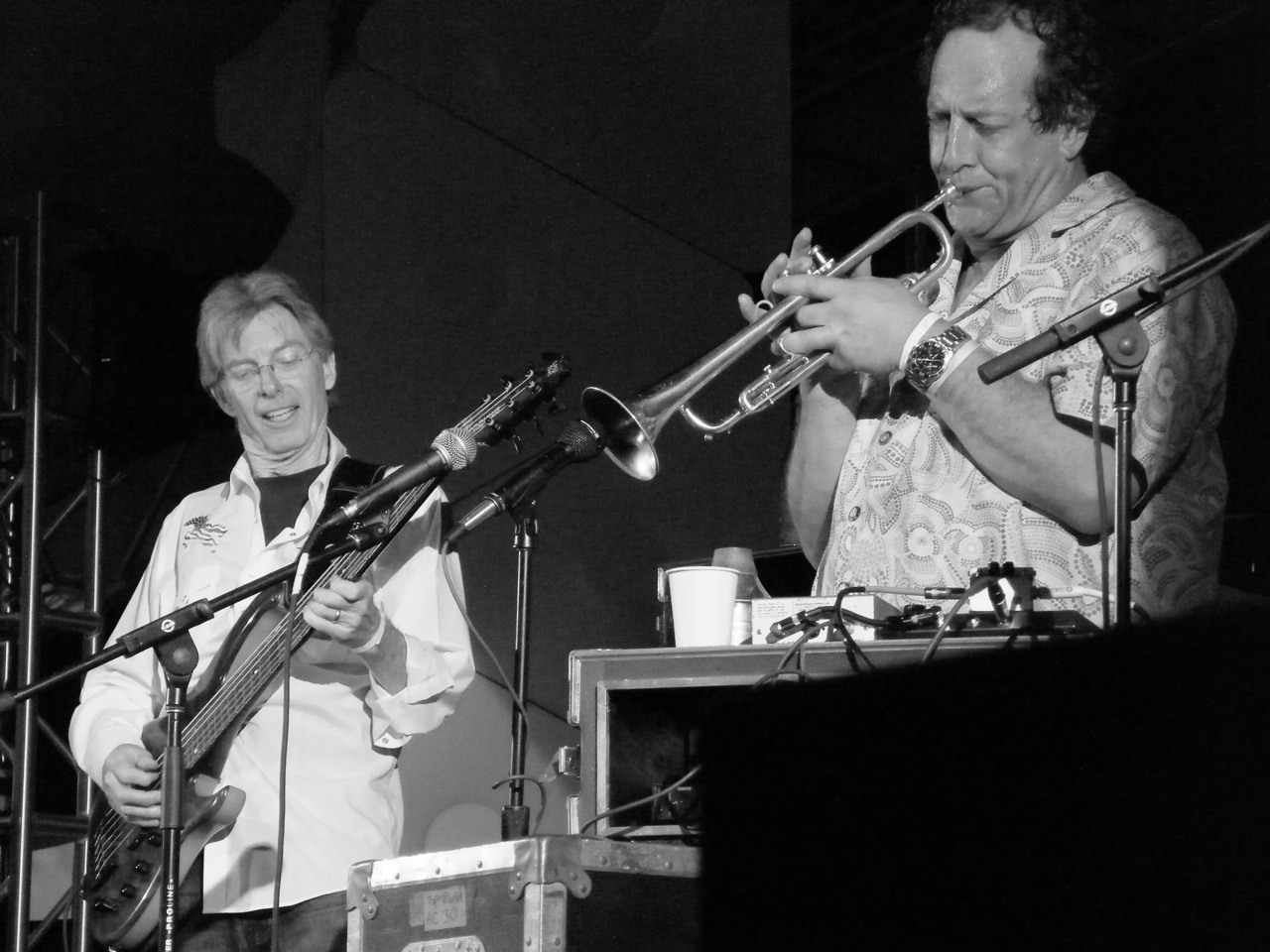
Phil Lesh (left) performing with TelStar in 2008

As the band and its sound matured over thirty years of touring, playing, and recording, each member's stylistic contribution became more defined, consistent, and identifiable. Garcia's lead lines were fluid, supple and spare, owing a great deal of their character to his experience playing Scruggs style banjo, an approach which often makes use of note syncopation, accenting, arpeggios, staccato chromatic runs, and the anticipation of the downbeat.

Garcia had a distinctive sense of timing, often weaving in and out of the groove established by the rest of the band as if he were pushing the beat. His lead lines were also immensely influenced by jazz soloists: Garcia cited Miles Davis, Ornette Coleman, Bill Evans, Pat Martino, George Benson, Al Di Meola, Art Tatum, Duke Ellington, and Django Reinhardt as primary influences, and frequently utilized techniques common to country and blues music in songs that called back to those traditions.

Garcia often switched scales in the midst of a solo depending upon the chord changes played underneath, though he nearly always finished phrases by landing on the chord-tones. Jerry most frequently played in the Mixolydian mode, though his solos and phrases often incorporated notes from the Dorian and major/minor pentatonic scales. Particularly in the late 1960s, Garcia occasionally incorporated melodic lines derived from Indian ragas into the band's extended, psychedelic improvisation, likely inspired by John Coltrane and other jazz artists' interest in the sitar music of Ravi Shankar.

Lesh was originally a classically trained trumpet player with an extensive background in music theory, but did not tend to play traditional blues-based bass forms. He often played more melodic, symphonic and complex lines, often sounding like a second lead guitar. In contrast to most bassists in popular music, Lesh often avoids playing the root of a chord on the downbeat, instead withholding as a means to build tension. Lesh also rarely repeats the same bassline, even from performance to performance of the same song, and often plays off of or around the other instruments with a syncopated, staccato bounce that contributes to the Dead's unique rhythmic character.

Weir, too, was not a traditional rhythm guitarist, but tended to play unique inversions at the upper end of the Dead's sound. Weir modeled his style of playing after jazz pianist McCoy Tyner and attempted to replicate the interplay between John Coltrane and Tyner in his support, and occasional subversion, of the harmonic structure of Garcia's voice leadings. This would often influence the direction the band's improvisation would take on a given night. Weir and Garcia's respective positions as rhythm and lead guitarist were not always strictly adhered to, as Weir would often incorporate short melodic phrases into his playing to support Garcia and occasionally took solos, often played with a slide. Weir's playing is characterized by a "spiky, staccato" sound.

The band's two drummers, Mickey Hart and Bill Kreutzmann, developed a unique, complex interplay, balancing Kreutzmann's steady shuffle beat with Hart's interest in percussion styles outside the rock tradition. Kreutzmann has said, "I like to establish a feeling and then add radical or oblique juxtapositions to that feeling." Hart incorporated an 11-count measure to his drumming, bringing a dimension to the band's sound that became an important part of its style. He had studied tabla drumming and incorporated rhythms and instruments from world music, and later electronic music, into the band's live performances.

The Dead's live performances featured multiple types of improvisation derived from a vast array of musical traditions. Not unlike many rock bands of their time, the majority of the Dead's songs feature a designated section in which an instrumental break occurs over the chord changes. These sections typically feature solos by Garcia that often originate as variations on the song's melody, but go on to create dynamic phrases that resolve by returning to the chord-tones. Not unlike traditional improvisational jazz, they may occasionally feature several solos by multiple instruments within an undecided number of bars, such as a keyboardist, before returning to the melody. At the same time, Dead shows almost always feature a more collective, modal approach to improvisation that typically occurs during segues between songs before the band modulates to a new tonal center. Some of the Dead's more extended jam vehicles, such as "The Other One", "Dark Star", and "Playing in the Band" almost exclusively make use of modulation between modes to accompany simple two-chord progressions.

=== Lyrical themes ===
Following the songwriting renaissance that defined the band's early 1970s period, as reflected in the albums Workingman's Dead and American Beauty, Robert Hunter, Jerry Garcia's primary lyrical partner, frequently made use of motifs common to American folklore including trains, guns, elements, traditional musical instruments, gambling, murder, animals, alcohol, descriptions of American geography, and religious symbolism to illustrate themes involving love and loss, life and death, beauty and horror, and chaos and order. Following in the footsteps of several American musical traditions, these songs are often confessional and feature narration from the perspective of an antihero. Critic Robert Christgau described them as "American myths" that later gave way to "the old karma-go-round".

An extremely common feature in both Robert Hunter's lyrics, as well as the band's visual iconography, is the presence of dualistic and opposing imagery illustrating the dynamic range of the human experience (Heaven and hell, law and crime, dark and light, etc.). Hunter and Garcia's earlier, more directly psychedelic-influenced compositions often make use of surreal imagery, nonsense, and whimsey reflective of traditions in English poetry. In a retrospective, The New Yorker described Hunter's verses as "elliptical, by turns vivid and gnomic", which were often "hippie poetry about roses and bells and dew". Grateful Dead biographer Dennis McNally has described Hunter's lyrics as creating "a non-literal hyper-Americana" weaving a psychedelic, kaleidoscopic tapestry in the hopes of elucidating America's national character. At least one of Hunter and Bob Weir's collaborations, "Jack Straw", was inspired by the work of John Steinbeck.

== Influence and legacy ==
Grateful Dead have been called a "symbol of the counterculture movement of the sixties". Beginning in the early 1990s, a new generation of bands became inspired by the Grateful Dead's improvisational ethos and marketing strategy, and began to incorporate elements of the Grateful Dead's live performances into their own shows. These include the nightly alteration of setlists, frequent improvisation, the blending of genres, and the allowance of taping, which would often contribute to the development of a dedicated fanbase. Bands associated with the expansion of the "jam scene" include Phish, the String Cheese Incident, Widespread Panic, Blues Traveler, Moe, and the Disco Biscuits. Many of these groups began to look past the American roots music that the Grateful Dead drew inspiration from, and incorporated elements of progressive rock, hard rock, and electronica. At the same time, the Internet gained popularity and provided a medium for fans to discuss these bands and their performances and download MP3s. The Grateful Dead, as well as Phish, were one of the first bands to have a Usenet newsgroup.

== Merchandising and representation ==
Hal Kant was an entertainment industry attorney who specialized in representing musical groups. He spent 35 years as principal lawyer and general counsel for the Grateful Dead, a position in the group that was so strong that his business cards with the band identified his role as "Czar".

Kant brought the band millions of dollars in revenue through his management of the band's intellectual property and merchandising rights. At Kant's recommendation, the group was one of the few rock 'n roll pioneers to retain ownership of their music masters and publishing rights.

In 2006, the Grateful Dead signed a ten-year licensing agreement with Rhino Entertainment to manage the band's business interests including the release of musical recordings, merchandising, and marketing. The band retained creative control and kept ownership of its music catalog.

A Grateful Dead video game titled Grateful Dead Game – The Epic Tour was released in April 2012 and was created by Curious Sense.

In November 2022, the children's book The ABCs of The Grateful Dead was released. Authorized by the group, it was written by Howie Abrams, illustrated by Michael "Kaves" McLeer, and published by Simon & Schuster.

=== Sponsorship of 1992 Lithuanian Olympic basketball team ===
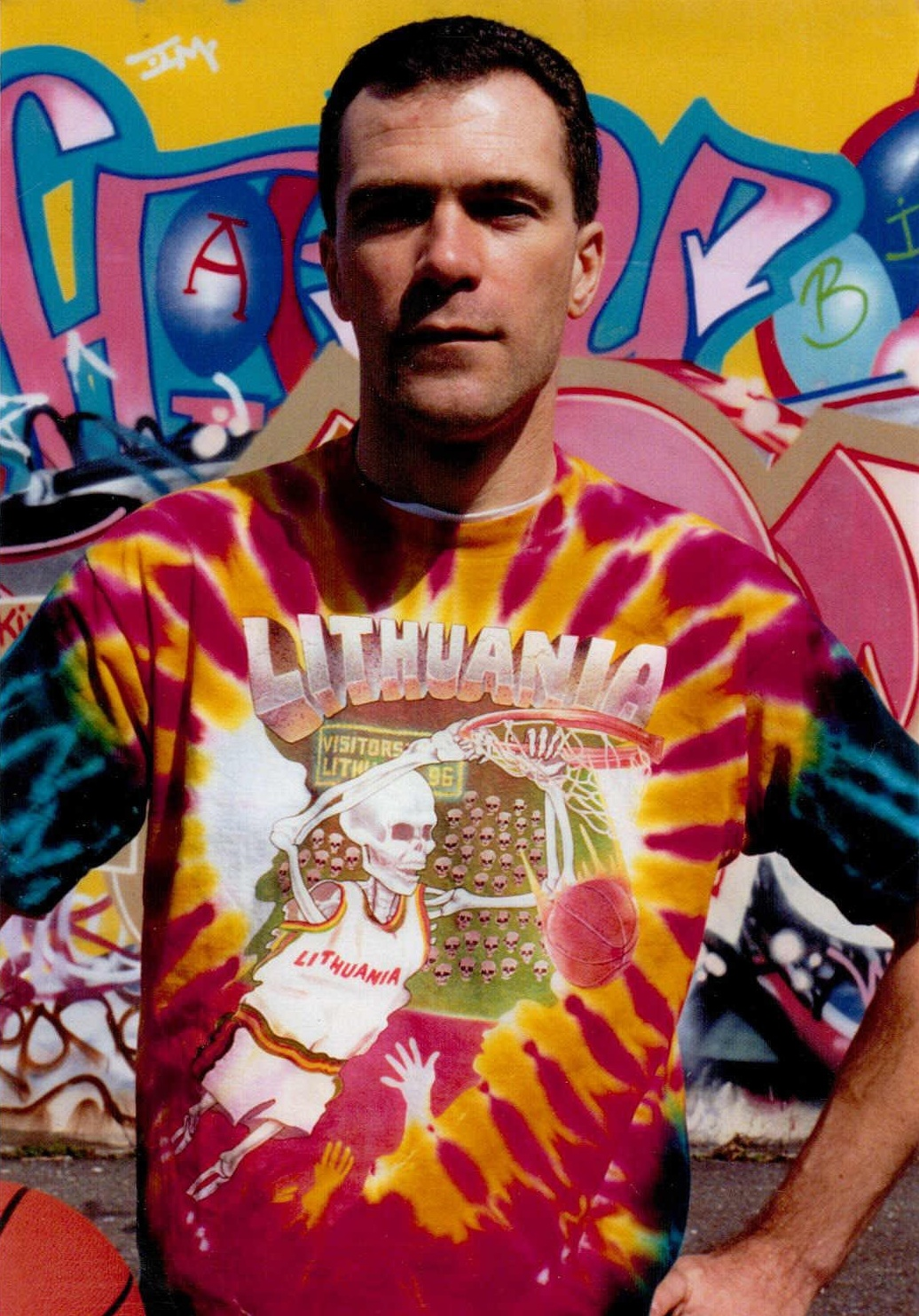
The "Skully" tie-dyed T-shirt, designed by New York City artist Greg Speirs, became a symbol of Lithuanian basketball.

After Lithuania gained its independence from the USSR, the country announced its withdrawal from the 1992 Olympics due to the lack of any money to sponsor participants. But NBA star Šarūnas Marčiulionis, a native Lithuanian basketball star, wanted to help his native team to compete. His efforts resulted in a call from representatives of the Grateful Dead who set up a meeting with the band members. The band agreed to fund transportation costs for the team (about $5,000) along with Grateful Dead designs for the team's jerseys and shorts. The Lithuanian basketball team won the bronze medal and the Lithuanian basketball/Grateful Dead T-shirts became part of pop culture, especially in Lithuania. The incident was covered by the documentary The Other Dream Team.

== Live performances ==
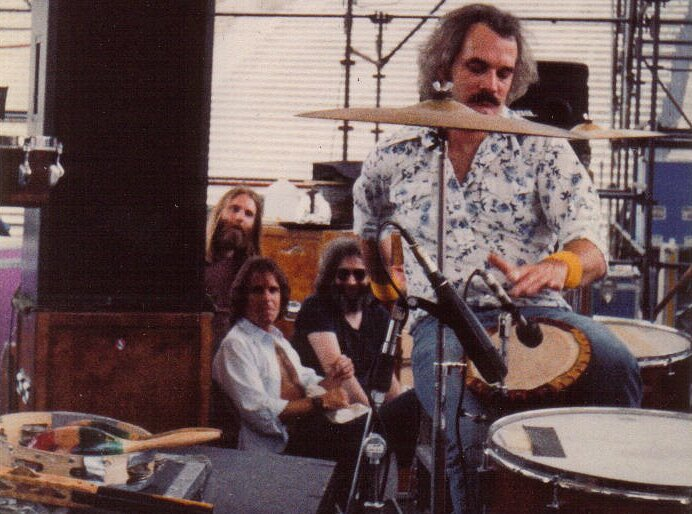
Grateful Dead members in the early 1980s: Brent Mydland, Bob Weir, and Jerry Garcia watch Bill Kreutzmann play the drums.

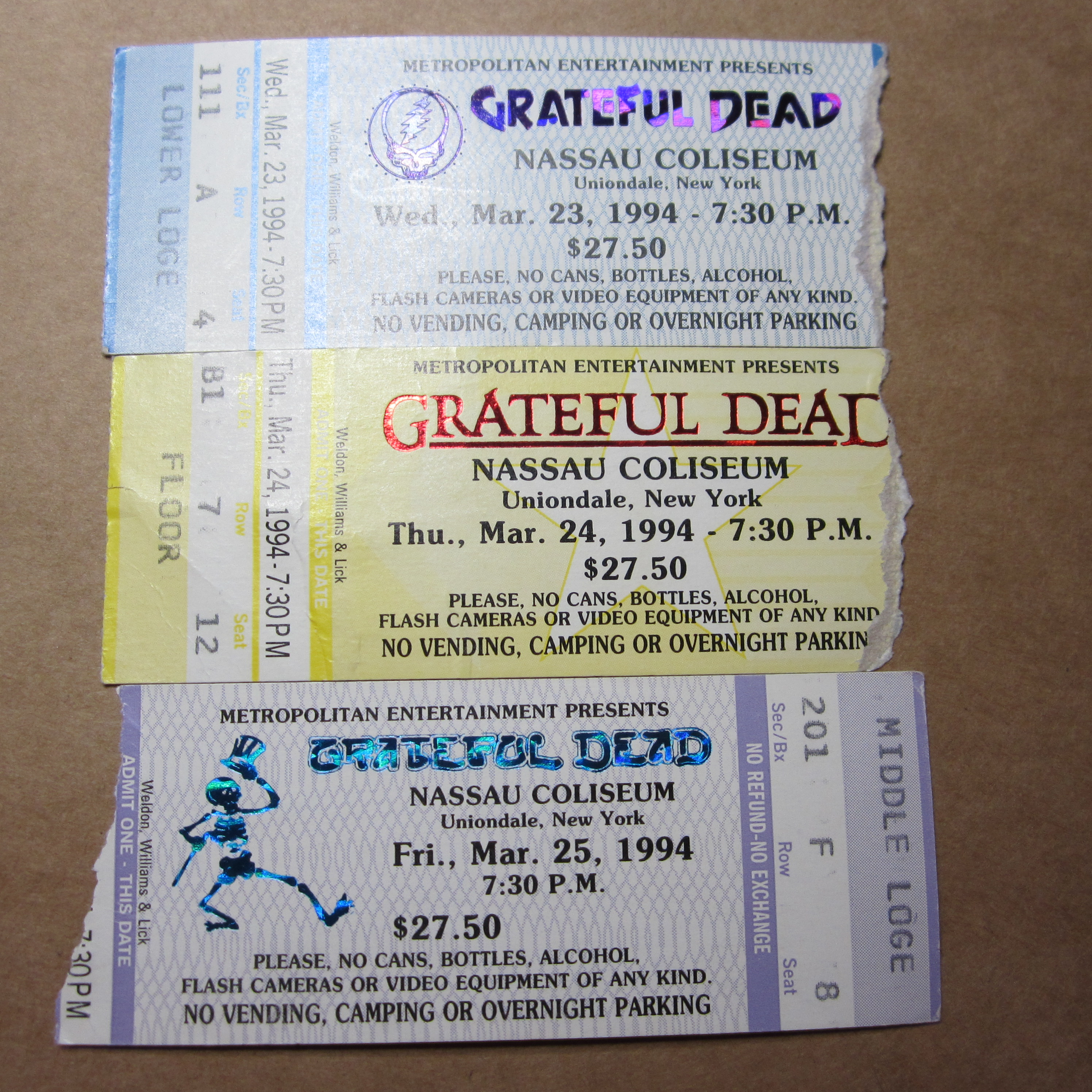
Mail-ordered Grateful Dead concert tickets for their concerts at Nassau Coliseum on Long Island in March 1994

The Grateful Dead toured constantly throughout their career, playing more than 2,300 concerts. They promoted a sense of community among their fans, who became known as "Deadheads", many of whom followed their tours for months or years on end. Around concert venues, an impromptu communal marketplace known as "Shakedown Street" was created by Deadheads to serve as centers of activity where fans could buy and sell a variety of goods, including food items.

In their early career, the band also dedicated their time and talents to their community, the Haight-Ashbury area of San Francisco, making available free food, lodging, music, and health care to all. It has been said that the band performed "more free concerts than any band in the history of music".

With the exception of 1975, when the band was on hiatus and played only four concerts, Grateful Dead performed many concerts every year, from their formation in April 1965, until July 9, 1995. Initially all their shows were in California, principally in the San Francisco Bay Area and in or near Los Angeles. They also performed, in 1965 and 1966, with Ken Kesey and the Merry Pranksters, as the house band for the Acid Tests.

In 1967, they toured nationally, including their first performance in New York City. They appeared at the Monterey Pop Festival in 1967, the Woodstock Festival in 1969 and the Festival Express train tour across Canada in 1970. They were scheduled to appear as the final act at the infamous Altamont Free Concert on December 6, 1969, after the Rolling Stones but withdrew after security concerns. "That's the way things went at Altamont—so badly that the Grateful Dead, prime organizers and movers of the festival, didn't even get to play", staff at Rolling Stone magazine wrote in a detailed narrative on the event.

Their first UK performance was at the Hollywood Music Festival in 1970. Their largest concert audience came in 1973 when they played, along with the Allman Brothers Band and the Band, before an estimated 600,000 people at the Summer Jam at Watkins Glen. They played to an estimated total of 25 million people, more than any other band, with audiences of up to 80,000 attending a single show. Many of these concerts were preserved in the band's tape vault, and several dozen have since been released on CD and as downloads. The Dead were known for the tremendous variation in their setlists from night to night—the list of songs documented to have been played by the band exceeds 500. The band has released four concert videos under the name View from the Vault. In 1978, they played three nights at the Great Pyramid of Giza in Egypt.

In the 1990s, the Grateful Dead earned a total of $285 million in revenue from their concert tours, the second-highest during the 1990s, with the Rolling Stones earning the most. This figure is representative of tour revenue through 1995, as touring stopped after the death of Jerry Garcia.

In a 1991 PBS documentary, segment host Buck Henry attended an August 1991 concert at Shoreline Amphitheatre and gleaned some information from some band members about the Grateful Dead phenomenon and its success. At the time, Jerry Garcia stated, "We didn't really invent the Grateful Dead, the crowd invented the Grateful Dead, you know what I mean? We were sort of standing in line, and uh, it's gone way past our expectations, way past, so it's, we've been going along with it to see what it's gonna do next." Mickey Hart said, "This is one of the last places in America that you can really have this kind of fun, you know, considering the political climate and so forth." Hart also stated that "the transformative power of the Grateful Dead is really the essence of it; it's what it can do to your consciousness. We're more into transportation than we are into music, per se, I mean, the business of the Grateful Dead is transportation." One of the band's largest concerts took place just months before Garcia's death, at their outdoor show with Bob Dylan in Highgate, Vermont, on June 15, 1995. The crowd was estimated to be over 90,000; overnight camping was allowed and about a third of the audience got in without having purchased a ticket.

=== Concert sound systems ===
The Wall of Sound was a large sound system designed specifically for the band. The band was never satisfied with the house system anywhere they played. After the Monterey Pop Festival, the band's crew 'borrowed' some of the other performers' sound equipment and used it to host some free shows in San Francisco. In their early days, soundman Owsley "Bear" Stanley designed a public address (PA) and monitor system for them. Stanley was the Grateful Dead's soundman for many years; he was also one of the largest suppliers of LSD.

Stanley's sound systems were delicate and finicky, and frequently brought shows to a halt with technical breakdowns. After Stanley went to jail for manufacturing LSD in 1970, the group briefly used house PAs, but found them to be even less reliable than those built by their former soundman. On February 2, 1970, the group contacted Bob Heil to use his system. In 1971, the band purchased their first solid-state sound system from Alembic Studios. Because of this, Alembic would play an integral role in the research, development, and production of the Wall of Sound. The band also welcomed Dan Healy into the fold on a permanent basis that year. Healy would mix the Grateful Dead's live sound until 1993.

Following Jerry Garcia's death and the band's breakup in 1995, their current sound system was inherited by Dave Matthews Band. Dave Matthews Band debuted the sound system April 30, 1996, at the first show of their 1996 tour in Richmond, Virginia.

=== Tapes ===
Like several other bands at the time, the Grateful Dead allowed their fans to record their shows. For many years the tapers set up their microphones wherever they could, and the eventual forest of microphones became a problem for the sound crew. Eventually, this was solved by having a dedicated taping section located behind the soundboard, which required a special "tapers" ticket. The band allowed sharing of their shows, as long as no profits were made on the sale of the tapes.

Of the approximately 2,350 shows the Grateful Dead played, almost 2,200 were taped, and most of these are available online. The band began collecting and cataloging tapes early on and Dick Latvala was their keeper. "Dick's Picks" is named after Latvala. After his death in 1999, David Lemieux gradually took the post. Concert set lists from a subset of 1,590 Grateful Dead shows were used to perform a comparative analysis between how songs were played in concert and how they are listened online by Last.fm members. In their book Marketing Lessons from the Grateful Dead: What Every Business Can Learn From the Most Iconic Band in History, David Meerman Scott and Brian Halligan identify the taper section as a crucial contributor to increasing the Grateful Dead's fan base.

== Iconography ==
Over the years, a number of iconic images have come to be associated with the Grateful Dead. Many of these images originated as artwork for concert posters or album covers.

Skull and Roses
The skull and roses design was created by Alton Kelley and Stanley Mouse, who added lettering and color, respectively, to a black and white drawing by Edmund Joseph Sullivan. Sullivan's drawing was an illustration for a 1913 edition of the Rubaiyat of Omar Khayyam. Earlier antecedents include the custom of exhibiting the relic skulls of Christian martyrs decorated with roses on their feast days. The rose is an attribute of Saint Valentine, who according to one legend, was martyred by decapitation. Accordingly, in Rome, at the church dedicated to him, the observance of his feast day included the display of his skull surrounded by roses. Kelley and Mouse's design originally appeared on a poster for the September 16 and 17, 1966, Dead shows at the Avalon Ballroom. Later, it was used as the cover for the album Grateful Dead (1971). The album is sometimes referred to as Skull and Roses.

Jester
Another icon of the Dead is a skeleton dressed as a jester and holding a lute. This image was an airbrush painting, created by Stanley Mouse in 1972. It was originally used for the cover of The Grateful Dead Songbook.

"Dancing" Bears
A series of stylized bears who appear to be dancing was drawn by Bob Thomas as part of the back cover for the album History of the Grateful Dead, Volume One (Bear's Choice) (1973). Thomas reported that he based the bears on a lead sort from an unknown font. The bear is a reference to Owsley "Bear" Stanley, who recorded and produced the album. Bear himself wrote, "the bears on the album cover are not really 'dancing'. I don't know why people think they are; their positions are quite obviously those of a high-stepping march."

Steal Your Face Skull
Perhaps the best-known Grateful Dead art icon is a red, white, and blue skull with a lightning bolt through it. The lightning bolt skull can be found on the cover of the album Steal Your Face (1976), and the image is sometimes known by that name. It was designed by Owsley Stanley and artist Bob Thomas, and was originally used as a logo to mark the band's equipment.

Dancing Terrapins
The two dancing terrapins first appeared on the cover of the album Terrapin Station (1977). They were drawn by Kelley and Mouse, based on a drawing by Heinrich Kley. Since then these turtles have become one of the Grateful Dead's most recognizable logos.

Uncle Sam Skeleton
The Uncle Sam skeleton was devised by Gary Gutierrez as part of the animation for The Grateful Dead Movie (1977). The image combines the Grateful Dead skeleton motif with the character of Uncle Sam, a reference to the then-recently written song "U.S. Blues", which plays during the animation.

== Deadheads ==
Fans and enthusiasts of the band are commonly referred to as Deadheads. While the origin of the term may be unclear, Dead Heads were made canon by the notice placed inside the Skull and Roses (1971) album by manager Jon McIntire:

DEAD FREAKS UNITE: Who are you? Where are you? How are you?
Send us your name and address and we'll keep you informed.
Dead Heads, P.O. Box 1065, San Rafael, California 94901.

As each show featured a new setlist and a great deal of improvisation, Deadheads would often follow the band from city to city, attending many shows on a given tour. Many Deadheads speak of being drawn to the culture due to the sense of community that the band's shows tended to foster. Though Deadheads came from a wide array of demographics, many attempted to reproduce the aesthetics and values of the 1960s counterculture and were often stigmatized in the media. Because of the stereotyping of Deadheads as hippies, the band's shows became a common target for officials in the DEA and arrests at shows became common because of the use of acid at the concerts.

As a group, the Deadheads were considered very mellow. "I'd rather work nine Grateful Dead concerts than one Oregon football game", Police Det. Rick Raynor said. "They don't get belligerent like they do at the games." Despite this reputation, in the mid-1990s, as the band's popularity grew, there were a series of minor scuffles occurring at shows that peaked with a large scale riot at the Deer Creek Music Center near Indianapolis in July 1995. This gate crashing incident caused the band to cancel the following night's show. Deadheads who appeared on the scene after the band's 1987 hit single "Touch of Grey", were often disparagingly referred to by older fans as "Touchheads". Beginning in the 1980s, a number of definable sects of Deadheads began to appear on the scene. These included the Wharf Rats, as well as the "spinners", named for their whirling-style of dancing and their use of the band's music to facilitate mystical experiences.

Deadheads, particularly those who collected tapes, were known for keeping close records of the band's setlists and for comparing various live versions of the band's songs, as reflected in publications such as the various editions of "Deadbase" and "The Deadhead's Taping Compendium". This practice continues into the 21st century on digital forums and websites such as the Internet Archive, which features live recordings of nearly every available Grateful Dead show and allows users to discuss and review the site's shows.

The band has a number of influential and celebrity fans, including politicians, businesspeople, journalists, and other musicians.

== Donation of archives to UC Santa Cruz ==
On April 24, 2008, members Bob Weir and Mickey Hart, along with Nion McEvoy, CEO of Chronicle Books, UC Santa Cruz chancellor George R. Blumenthal, and UC Santa Cruz librarian Virginia Steel, held a press conference announcing UCSC's McHenry Library would be the permanent home of the Grateful Dead Archive, which includes a complete archival history from 1965 to the present. The archive includes correspondence, photographs, fliers, posters, and several other forms of memorabilia and records of the band. Also included are unreleased videos of interviews and TV appearances that will be installed for visitors to view, as well as stage backdrops and other props from the band's concerts.

Blumenthal stated at the event, "The Grateful Dead Archive represents one of the most significant popular cultural collections of the 20th century; UC Santa Cruz is honored to receive this invaluable gift. The Grateful Dead and UC Santa Cruz are both highly innovative institutions—born the same year—that continue to make a major, positive impact on the world." Guitarist Bob Weir stated "We looked around, and UC Santa Cruz seems the best possible home. If you ever wrote the Grateful Dead a letter, you'll probably find it there!"

Professor of music Fredric Lieberman was the key contact between the band and the university, who let the university know about the search for a home for the archive, and who had collaborated with Mickey Hart on three books in the past, Planet Drum (1990), Drumming at the Edge of Magic (1991), and Spirit into Sound (2006).

The first large-scale exhibition of materials from the Grateful Dead Archive was mounted at the New-York Historical Society in 2010.

== Awards ==
In 2004, Rolling Stone ranked the Grateful Dead No. 57 on their list of the 100 Greatest Artists of All Time.

On February 10, 2007, the Grateful Dead received a Grammy Lifetime Achievement Award. The award was accepted on behalf of the band by Mickey Hart and Bill Kreutzmann.

In 2011, a recording of the Grateful Dead's May 8, 1977, concert at Cornell University's Barton Hall was selected for induction into the National Recording Registry of the Library of Congress.

Twelve members of the Grateful Dead (the eleven official performing members plus Robert Hunter) were inducted into the Rock and Roll Hall of Fame in 1994, and presented by Bruce Hornsby.

In 2024, the band was named as one of the recipients of the Kennedy Center Honors. The three living core members (Weir, Hart and Kreutzmann) received the award. As he was named a recipient prior to his death, Lesh received the award posthumously.

On December 4, 2025, the Grateful Dead was awarded a Guinness World Records title for the most Top 40 albums in Billboard 200 history with 66 Top 40 albums. The Grateful Dead previously broke the record in February 2024 with 60 Top 40 albums after having been tied with Frank Sinatra and Elvis Presley for most Top 40 albums (59) in November 2023.

== Members ==
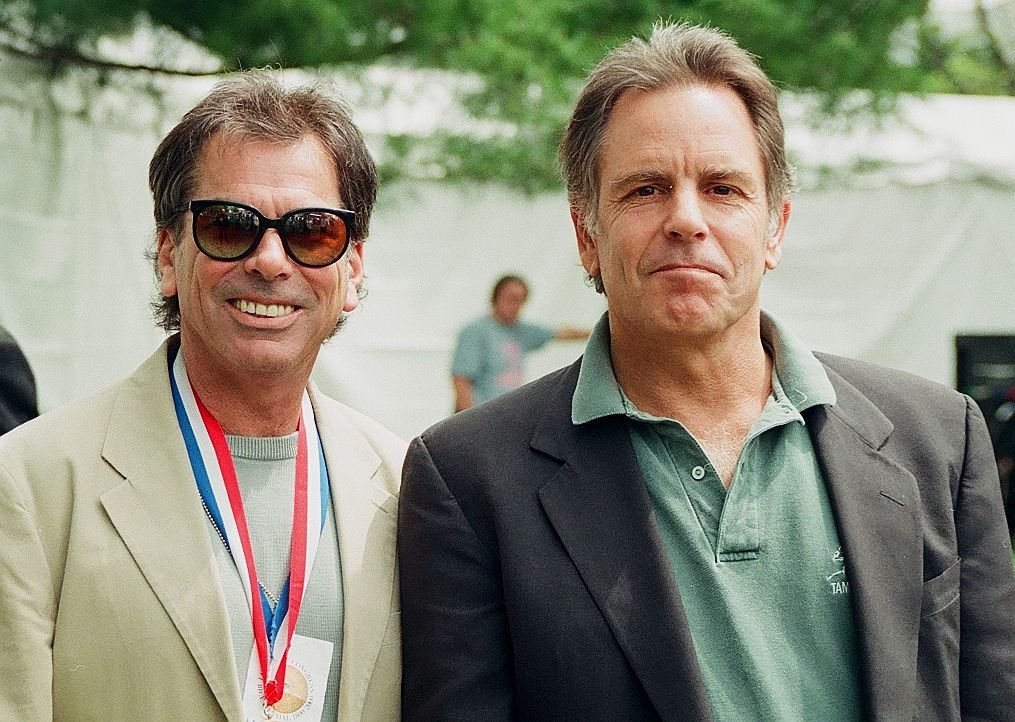
Mickey Hart and Bob Weir at the 200th celebration of the founding of the Library of Congress in Washington, D.C., in 2000

=== Former members ===
- Jerry Garcia – lead and backing vocals, guitars (1965–1995; his death)
- Bob Weir – lead and backing vocals, guitars (1965–1995; died 2026)
- Phil Lesh – bass guitar, backing and lead vocals (1965–1995; died 2024)
- Bill Kreutzmann – drums, percussion (1965–1995)
- Ron "Pigpen" McKernan – lead and backing vocals, keyboards, organ, harmonica, percussion, occasional guitar (1965–1973; his death; not touring after June 17, 1972)
- Mickey Hart – drums, percussion (1967–1971; 1974–1995)
- Tom Constanten – keyboards (1968–1970)
- Keith Godchaux – keyboards, backing vocals (1971–1979; died 1980)
- Donna Jean Godchaux – backing and lead vocals (1971–1979; died 2025)
- Brent Mydland – keyboards, backing and lead vocals (1979–1990; his death)
- Vince Welnick – keyboards, backing and lead vocals (1990–1995; died 2006)
- Robert Hunter – lyrics (1967–1995; died 2019)
- John Perry Barlow – lyrics (1971–1995; died 2018)

=== Frequent collaborators ===
- Ned Lagin – keyboards, synthesizers (1970–1975)
- Bruce Hornsby – keyboards, vocals (1990–1992)

Lead guitarist Jerry Garcia was often viewed both by the public and the media as the leader or primary spokesperson for the Grateful Dead, but was reluctant to be perceived that way, especially since he and the other group members saw themselves as equal participants and contributors to their collective musical and creative output. Garcia, a native of San Francisco, grew up in the Excelsior District. One of his main influences was bluegrass music, and he also performed—on banjo, one of his other great instrumental loves, along with the pedal steel guitar—in bluegrass bands, notably Old & In the Way with mandolinist David Grisman.

Ned Lagin, a young MIT student and friend of the band, guested with them many times from 1970 through 1975, providing a second keyboard as well as synthesizers. Upon graduating from MIT, he began touring with the band fulltime in 1974, performing sets of electronic music with Phil Lesh, occasionally with Garcia and Kreutzmann, during the band's intermission. The "Ned and Phil" set became a regular fixture of that era, and was featured nearly every night during their Summer '74 and Europe '74 tours, as well as their five-night residency at the Winterland Ballroom during October 1974. Lagin is also featured in The Grateful Dead Movie. During 1974 and 1975, he would also occasionally play entire sets with the band, usually on Garcia's side of the stage, before ending his touring relationship with the band and focusing on his solo music projects, such as his album Seastones, which features several members of the Dead.

Bruce Hornsby never officially joined the band full-time because of his other commitments, but he did play keyboards at most Dead shows between September 1990 and March 1992, and sat in with the band over 100 times in all between 1988 and 1995. He added several Dead songs to his own live shows and Jerry Garcia referred to him as a "floating member" who could come and go as he pleased.

Robert Hunter and John Perry Barlow were the band's primary lyricists, starting in 1967 and 1971, respectively, and continuing until the band's dissolution. Hunter collaborated mostly with Garcia and Barlow mostly with Weir, though each wrote with other band members as well. Both are listed as official members at Dead.net, the band's website, alongside the performing members. Barlow was the only member not inducted into the Rock and Roll Hall of Fame.

== Discography ==
- The Grateful Dead (1967)
- Anthem of the Sun (1968)
- Aoxomoxoa (1969)
- Live/Dead (1969)
- Workingman's Dead (1970)
- American Beauty (1970)
- Grateful Dead (Skull & Roses) (1971)
- Europe '72 (1972)
- History of the Grateful Dead, Volume One (Bear's Choice) (1973)
- Wake of the Flood (1973)
- From the Mars Hotel (1974)
- Blues for Allah (1975)
- Steal Your Face (1976)
- Terrapin Station (1977)
- Shakedown Street (1978)
- Go to Heaven (1980)
- Reckoning (1981)
- Dead Set (1981)
- In the Dark (1987)
- Dylan & the Dead (1989)
- Built to Last (1989)
- Without a Net (1990)

== See also ==
- Internet Archive § Copyright issues
- List of Grateful Dead cover versions
