= Back Around =

Studio album by Donna Jean Godchaux Band with Jeff Mattson
- Released: February 18, 2014
- Genre: Rock
- Length: 52:42
- Label: Heart of Gold
- Producer: Donna Jean Godchaux; David MacKay; Jeff Mattson; Jimmy Nutt

Donna Jean Godchaux chronology
Donna Jean and the Tricksters (2008)	Back Around (2014)

Back Around is an album by the Donna Jean Godchaux Band with Jeff Mattson. Band leader and vocalist Donna Jean Godchaux was formerly a member of the Grateful Dead. Lead guitarist Jeff Mattson, who also sings on several of the tracks, is a member of Dark Star Orchestra and the Zen Tricksters. The album was released by Heart of Gold Records on February 18, 2014.

== Production ==
Back Around was recorded at Nutthouse Studio in Sheffield, Alabama.

In an interview with dead.net, Donna Jean Godchaux said, "The band came [to the studio] to record basic tracks and then we started to think about how to proceed from there. It was a very exciting time with 'the sky is the limit' as to what we could actually do. Since over half the band was in the Northeast, David [MacKay], Jimmy Nutt, and myself were the locals who parked ourselves in the studio over an extended period of time and brainstormed. When Jeff [Mattson] was available, he came down to play more guitar and add his take to the glee and madness we were enjoying. 'Evolved' is the operative word regarding the progression of this recording."

In an interview with The Quad-Cities Daily, album co-producer Jimmy Nutt said, "Donna, from the very beginning, said 'I want this to be the best thing I've done, I want to take my time. I don't want any deadlines. I want to get it right. I want my vocals to be right.' So from the beginning we knew it was going to take as long as it took, period. Rome wasn't built in a day and neither was this album. We took our time. Actually, we spent anywhere between one and a half to two years working on it.... Most of the songs had extended jam sessions, that we ended up editing down. And that was kind of our goal from the beginning."

== Critical reception ==
In Rolling Stone, David Browne wrote, "Godchaux's new album, Back Around — the third she's released under her own name since re-engaging with rock and soul in the Nineties – is what Godchaux calls 'my journey'. Cut in Alabama, the record pays homage to the Southern soul she first sang (in originals like "Don't Ask Me Why" and a cover of Wilson Pickett's "Don't Fight It"), covers of Sixties classics (the Stones' "19th Nervous Breakdown", the Beatles' "She Said She Said", the Youngbloods' "Darkness, Darkness"), even a nod to her former job with a cover of the Dead's "Crazy Fingers"."

== Track listing ==
1. "Don't Ask Me Why" (Donna Jean Godchaux) – 4:47
2. "Back Around" (Jeff Mattson, Godchaux) – 5:15
3. "19th Nervous Breakdown" (Mick Jagger, Keith Richards) – 5:39
4. "Don't Fight It" (Steve Cropper, Wilson Pickett) – 3:43
5. "Darkness, Darkness" (Jesse Colin Young) – 8:18
6. "Delta Jubilee" (Godchaux, Mattson) – 6:32
7. "She Said She Said" (John Lennon, Paul McCartney) – 5:20
8. "Crazy Fingers" (Jerry Garcia, Robert Hunter) – 6:30
9. "Stranger Things" (Dave Diamond, Godchaux) – 6:37

== Personnel ==
Donna Jean Godchaux Band

- Donna Jean Godchaux – vocals
- Jeff Mattson – guitar, vocals
- David MacKay – bass guitar
- Freeman White – keyboards
- Mark Adler – Wurly
- Joe Chirco – drums
- Peter Lavezzoli – drums, percussion

Muscle Shoals Horns

- Charles Rose – trombone, horn arrangements
- Harvey Thompson – sax
- Jim Horn – baritone sax, flute
- Steve Herman – trumpet

The More the Merrier Players

- Will McFarlane – guitar, background vocals
- Clint Bailey – organ, clavinet
- Richard Bailey – banjo
- Jimmy Nutt – percussion
- Cindy Walker – background vocals
- Marie Lewey – background vocals
- Gary Nichols – background vocals

Production

- Produced by Donna Jean Godchaux, David MacKay, Jeff Mattson, Jimmy Nutt
- Engineering: Jimmy Nutt
- Mastering: Jim DeMain
- Art direction, illustration, design: Joshua Marc Levy
