= JGB (band) =

American rock band

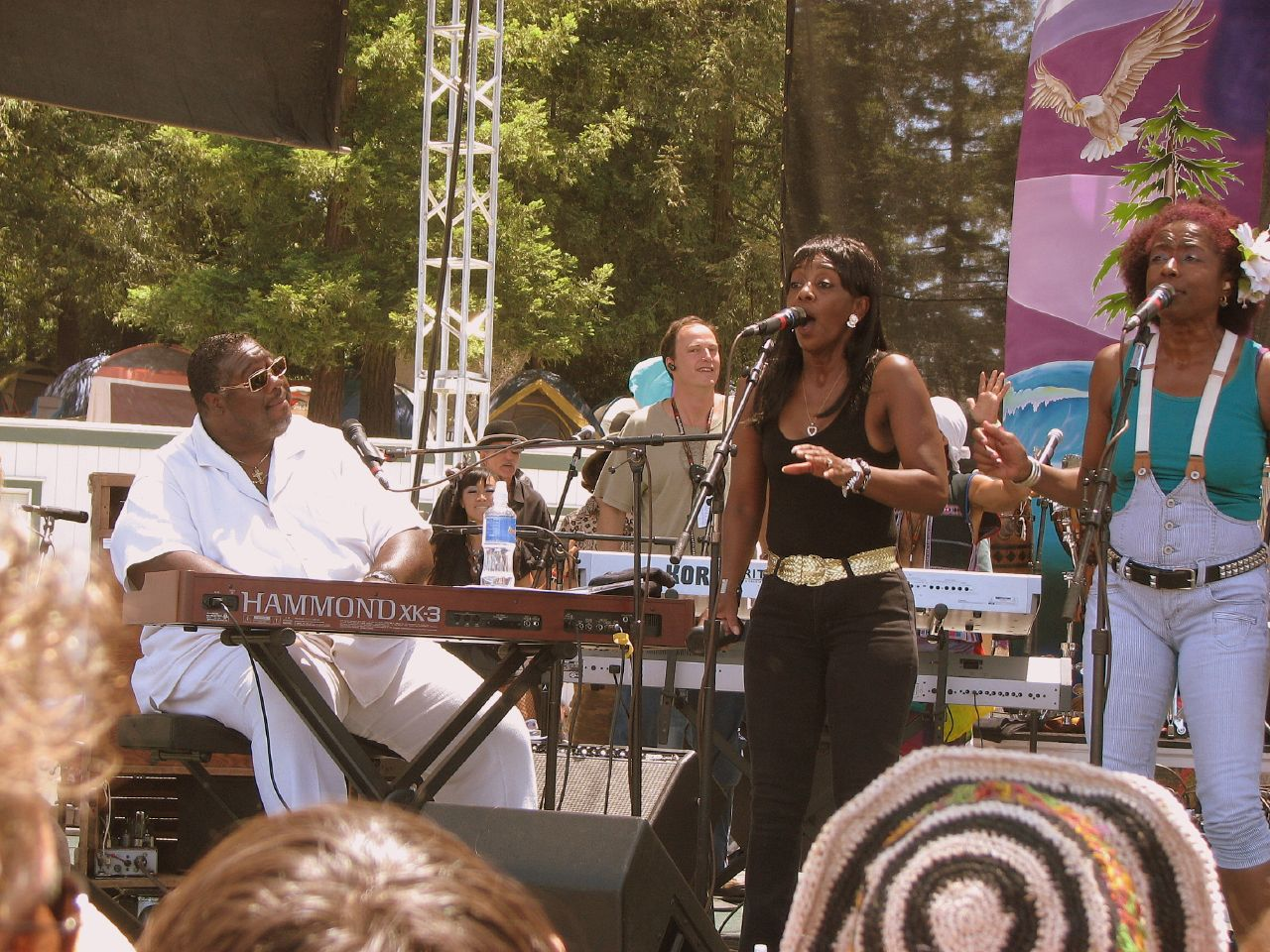
- Melvin Seals and JGB, 2008

Background information
- Also known as: Melvin Seals and JGB
- Genres: Rock
- Years active: 1995–present
- Labels: House of Blues, Blues Planet
- Members: Melvin Seals; John Kadlecik; John-Paul McLean; Jeremy Hoenig; Lady Chi; Darlene Coleman
- Past members: Sunshine Becker; John Kahn; Pete Lavezzoli; Jackie LaBranch; Zach Nugent; Gloria Jones; David Kemper; Ozzie Ahlers; Donny Baldwin; Armin Winter; Ronnie Penque; Johnny Markowski; Elgin Seals; Jude Gold; Stu Allen; Dave Hebert; Jimmy Tebeau; Jimmy Hubbard; Justin Purtill; Martin Holland; Kat Walkerson; Sam Howard; Rob Wenig; Mark Corsolini; Judith Harris Colman; Elizabeth Holland; Gail Muldrow; Robert Sheldon Coons; Joe White; Cheryl Rucker; Shirley Starks; Mary-eL
- Website: www.melvinsealsandjgb.com

JGB is an American rock band led by Melvin Seals, who plays electric organ. Its mission is to continue the musical legacy of the Jerry Garcia Band, of which Seals was a longtime member.

== History ==
As noted in Rolling Stone, "... when Garcia died in 1995, and the Grateful Dead went on hiatus, Seals took charge. Under his leadership, the slightly renamed 'JGB Band' pays tribute to Garcia by performing his songs and remaining faithful to his style."

In 1996, Seals played several concerts with Jerry Garcia Band bassist John Kahn and other former members of that band. Their idea was to continue playing the same music with everyone except Garcia himself. However, Kahn died three weeks later, and Seals and the others continued without him. The membership of JGB has continued to evolve over the years.

On July 30, 2004, Melvin Seals was the first Jerry Garcia Band member to headline an outdoor music and camping festival named in honor of Jerry Garcia, called Grateful Garcia Gathering. Jerry Garcia Band drummer David Kemper joined Melvin Seals & JGB in 2007. To date, other musicians playing with JGB have included Donna Jean Godchaux, Mookie Siegel, Pete Sears, G. E. Smith, Barry Sless, Ozzie Ahlers and Robin Sylvester.

As of 2024 the lineup of JGB is Melvin Seals on keyboards, John Kadlecik on guitar and vocals, John-Paul McLean on bass, Jeremy Hoenig on drums, and Lady Chi and Darlene Coleman on backing vocals.

== Discography ==
- Welcome to Our World (For Members Only) – 1998
- Keepers of the Flame – 2006
