= Larned =

Larned can refer to:

- Benjamin Larned (1794–1862), Paymaster General of the United States Army
- Charles Larned (died 1834), lawyer, military officer, and politician
- Josephus Nelson Larned (1836-1913), American journalist, educator, librarian, historian
- Larned B. Asprey
- Scott Larned (1969–2005), keyboardist
- Simon Larned (1753–1817), U.S. Representative from Massachusetts
- William Larned, American tennis player

== See also ==
- Larned, Kansas, a small city in the United States
- Fort Larned National Historic Site
- Fort Larned (horse), American Thoroughbred racehorse
