= Rob Barraco =

American keyboardist

- Genres: Rock & roll, Blues
- Occupation: Musician
- Instruments: Vocals, keyboards, guitar, Bass

Rob Barraco is an American keyboardist. Born on April 27th and raised on Long Island, NY, he has played with Phil Lesh and Friends, The Dead, Dark Star Orchestra, Chris Robinson & New Earth Mud, the Zen Tricksters, Red Flannel Hash, and The Dragonflys. He was the permanent keyboardist for Phil Lesh and Friends from 2000 to 2003 and has been in the band's line-up at other times. He also played keyboards (alongside Jeff Chimenti) when ex-members of The Grateful Dead reformed as The Other Ones (in 2002), and then as The Dead (in 2003).

Barraco has played music on both keyboard and guitar since the age of 6 and has been a professional musician all his adult life. For over ten years in the 1980s and early 1990s he was keyboardist for the popular The Cosby Show and its spin-off, A Different World. Rob toured with R&B performer Freddie Jackson in the late 1980s before joining The Zen Tricksters.

Rob spent eleven years touring and recording with The Tricksters, turning out two studio albums and playing live shows across the US and Canada. Their second album, A Love Surreal, brought the band to the attention of Grateful Dead bassist Phil Lesh, who summoned Rob and Trickster guitarist Jeff Mattson to play a series of shows in San Francisco and then on to tour the country double billing with Bob Dylan. That band included drummer John Molo and Allman Brothers Band guitarists Derek Trucks and Warren Haynes. The following year Barraco became a member of the Phil Lesh Quintet, including Lesh, Barraco, Molo, Haynes, and guitarist Jimmy Herring. Known by fans as "The Q", the Quintet went on to tour the United States for three years and put out one studio album, There and Back Again.

In 2002, Barraco joined with the original members of the Grateful Dead for two shows at the Alpine Valley Music Theater, and then toured with them as The Other Ones in 2002 and 2003. In 2004, he joined Chris Robinson's New Earth Mud. In 2005, Barraco toured with Dark Star Orchestra after the death of keyboardist Scott Larned and continues to play with them at the present time, although he also played sporadically with Phil Lesh and Friends in 2005 and continuously through 2006. Rob has also collaborated with Grateful Dead lyricist Robert Hunter on seven songs recorded on his 2007 solo release, When We All Come Home. Rob is currently playing with Skeleton Crewe, a quintet of jam band legends. Band consists of Barry Sless, Stephen Inglis, Jay Lane, and Pete Sears, all who have been associated with the jam band scene and beyond for many years. They play a lot of original music composed by all members.

== Discography ==
=== The Zen Tricksters ===
- The Holy Fool, 1997
- A Love Surreal, 1999
- For Rex: The Black Tie Dye Ball - The Zen Tricksters w/ Donna Godchaux, Mickey Hart, Tom Constanten, David Nelson, Michael Falzarano, Rob Barraco, 2006

=== Phil Lesh and Friends ===
- There And Back Again, 2002
- Live at the Warfield, 2006
- Instant Live Summer Tour, 2006

=== The Dead ===
- Summer Getaway, 2003

=== Gov't Mule ===
- The Deep End, Vol. 2, 2002

=== Rob Barraco ===
- When We All Come Home, 2007
