= Donna Jean and the Tricksters (album) =

Studio album by Donna Jean and the Tricksters
- Released: January 29, 2008
- Genre: Rock, jam band
- Label: Dig
- Producer: James Brooks; Donna Jean and the Tricksters

Donna Jean Godchaux chronology
At the Table (2004)	Donna Jean and the Tricksters (2008)	Back Around (2014)

Professional ratings
Review scores
Source	Rating
Allmusic	4/5 stars
The Best Of Website	(not rated)

Donna Jean and the Tricksters is an album by Donna Jean and the Tricksters, a rock band led by former Grateful Dead singer Donna Jean Godchaux-MacKay. The group, which later changed its name to the Donna Jean Godchaux Band, also features lead guitarist and singer Jeff Mattson, who wrote or co-wrote several songs on the album, along with other members of the Zen Tricksters.

Donna Jean and the Tricksters was released by Dig Records in 2008.

== Track listing ==
1. "All I Gotta Say" (Donna Jean Godchaux-MacKay) – 4:59
2. "So Hard" (Dave Diamond) – 5:49
3. "No Better Way" (Will McFarlane) – 4:34
4. "Weight of the World" (Dave Diamond) – 5:26
5. "Shelter" (Donna Jean Godchaux-MacKay, Jeff Mattson) – 5:38
6. "Travelin' Light" (Jeff Mattson, M. Marston) – 7:07
7. "He Said/She Said" (Donna Jean Godchaux-MacKay, Jeff Mattson) – 5:14
8. "Moments Away" (Tom Circosta) – 4:27
9. "Farewell Jack" (Keith Godchaux, Brian Godchaux) – 4:22
10. "A Prisoner Says His Piece" (Jeff Mattson) – 6:57
11. "Me and Kettle Joe" (Donna Jean Godchaux-MacKay) – 13:24
12. "Reno" (Klyph Black, John Edward McNeill) – 4:00

== Credits ==
=== Donna Jean and the Tricksters ===
- Klyph Black – bass guitar, vocals
- Tom Circosta – electric guitar, vocals
- Dave Diamond – drums, percussion, vocals
- Donna Jean Godchaux-MacKay – vocals
- Wendy Lanter – vocals
- Jeff Mattson – lead guitar, vocals
- Mookie Siegel – keyboards, vocals

=== Additional musicians ===
- Jason Crosby – violin on "He Said/She Said" and "A Prisoner Says His Piece"
- Dave Eggar – cello on "Shelter" and "He Said/She Said"
- Randi Mattson – handclaps on "Shelter"

=== Production ===
- Donna Jean and the Tricksters – producer
- James Brooks – executive producer
- Joe Napoli – recording
- Tim Stiegler – additional engineering
- Jason Corsaro – mixing
- Michael Ferretti and Dante Portella – assistant engineers
- Chris Gehringer – mastering
- Gary Houston – cover art and layout
- Susana Millman – photography
- Dennis McNally – publicity, management
