= Jeff Pehrson =

American singer-songwriter (born 1967)

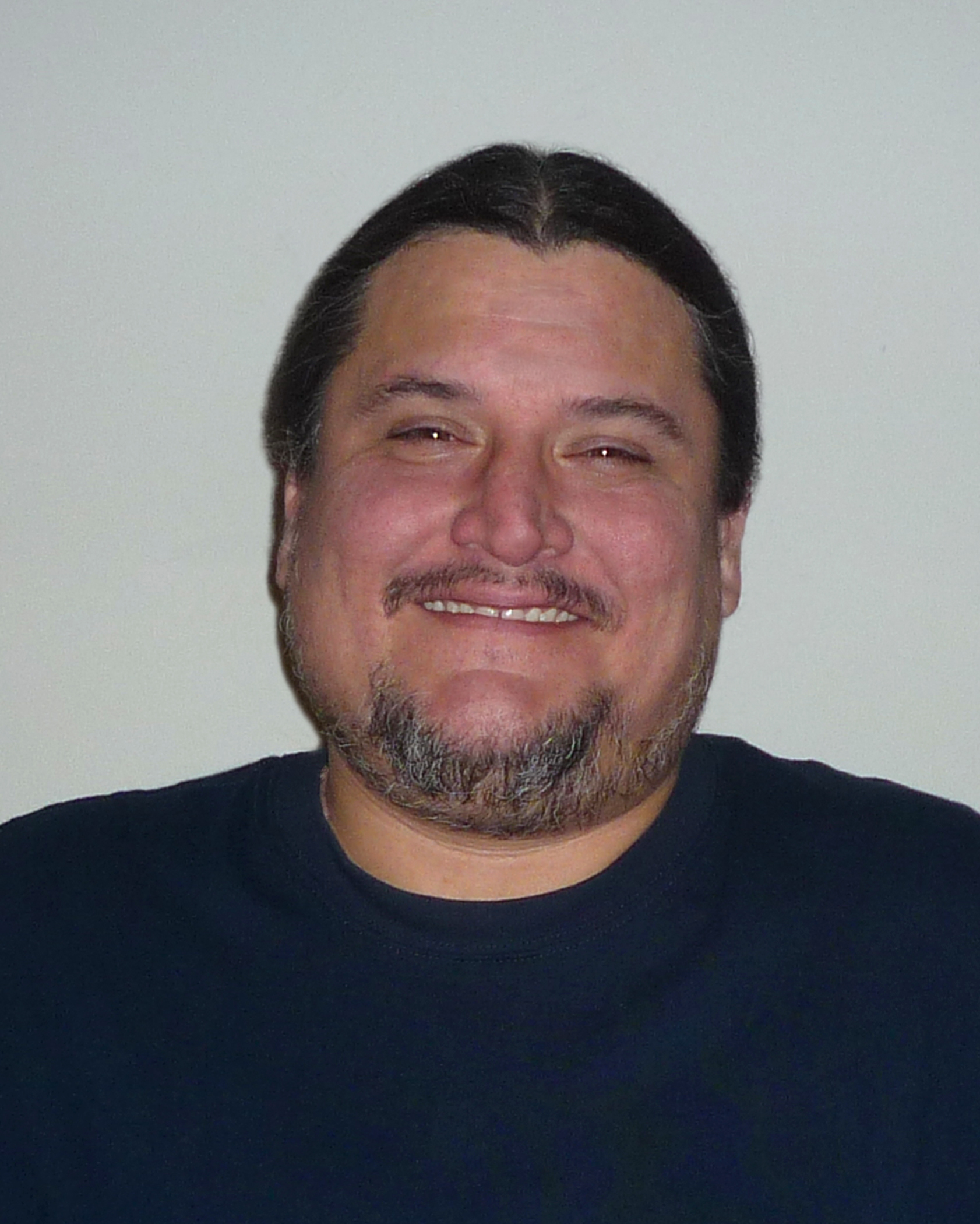
- Jeff Pehrson, December 11, 2011 @ Boardwalk Hall (Atlantic City, NJ) with Furthur

Background information
- Born: February 21, 1967 (age 59); San Francisco, California
- Genres: Rock, Psychedelic rock, R & B, Folk rock, Americana
- Occupations: Singer, Songwriter, Guitarist
- Instruments: Vocals, Guitar
- Years active: 1991–present
- Website: http://www.boxsetband.com Furthur.net

Jeff Pehrson (born Jeffery Vernon Pehrson on February 21, 1967 in San Francisco, California) is an American singer-songwriter who performed backing vocals for Furthur, a band that included two former members of the Grateful Dead. Pehrson also currently performs with the folk rock band The Fall Risk, which he founded, and with Box Set, a folk rock band which he cofounded.

== Early life ==
Jeff was born in 1967 in the Haight-Asbury district of San Francisco. His mother was of Native American heritage and his father, who was a concert pianist, was of Northern European descent. Jeff was adopted at three months of age by John Pehrson, who was an electrician and flight instructor, and Janice Quintana (née Petrie), who was an administrative assistant. Jeff's father remarried Christina Grant, a nurse, in 1980, and has a half-sister, Heather, from that marriage. Jeff was raised in the East Bay area in San Leandro, California and attended Pacific High School from 1981 until 1983, when the school closed, and subsequently attended San Leandro High School until his graduation in 1985. Jeff credits his earliest musical exposure to his father, a stereo fanatic who regularly played jazz music at home, and to his mother, a native of Kansas, who loved listening to country music. In the fourth grade, Jeff started playing saxophone in his school band and continued until the ninth grade, when he began focusing his attention on playing football for the school team and participating in the school's theater, performing regularly in plays and musicals, where his singing skills became increasingly apparent.

== Musical career ==
In 1985, Jeff matriculated at San Francisco State University, where he majored variously in broadcasting, political science, theater arts, and ultimately, creative writing. In college, Jeff was first exposed to guitar playing via friends in his dormitory, eventually trading his old saxophone for a guitar of his own. He took to the instrument extremely well with an apparent natural ability, and quickly proceeded to mastering rhythm guitar technique, which he used as a foundation for his subsequent songwriting.

In 1986, Jeff pursued his love for improvisational comedy by cofounding the Ground Zero Comedy Troupe with his college roommate, Jeff Ballard. The ensemble, which included six comedians and a band, performed humorous skits punctuated by musical numbers, and became increasingly popular around campus.

In 1987, Pehrson, along with Matt Twain, began frequenting The Owl and the Monkey Cafe in San Francisco, where they started out performing Pehrson's original songs as the Twain & Pehrson Duo on Thursday's "open mic" nights, ultimately appearing regularly in 1989 as part of the café's Saturday night concert series. In 1991, Jeff first met singer-songwriter Jim Brunberg, who came to hear the duo perform at Simple Pleasures, a café in San Francisco's Richmond District. Recognizing their innate musical chemistry, the three united and formed the trio Box Set, named for the then growing trend of artists releasing box set compilations. After a few months of playing locally, Pehrson and Brunberg decided to begin touring regionally. However, Twain, who had a day job, did not wish to travel and decided to leave the band. The resulting Box Set duo began playing small venues between San Francisco and Seattle.

In the summer of 1992, the two bought one-way tickets to Europe, where they spent several months playing their music in the streets, selling demo tapes, and writing songs. Returning to the US with accelerating enthusiasm and a plethora of fresh material, the duo began playing more frequently and at larger venues in the Bay Area. The songwriting and vibrant vocal harmonies of the two have prompted comparisons to Simon & Garfunkel. Aspiring to diversify their sound, though, Box Set added bass player Chad Heise and drummer Matt Abbott in 1993, and, shortly after producing their eponymous debut CD, recruited harmonica/keyboard player Sam Johnston in 1994. The band was recognized by Billboard on their "Honor Roll of Unsigned Talent" in 1994, and was named "Group of the Year" by the National Academy of Songwriters in 1995. In 1997, Box Set won two Bay Area Music Awards ("Bammies") for "Best Club Band" and "Outstanding Americana/Roots Band". Shortly thereafter, the group began touring nationally, opening for a number of bands, including Huey Lewis and the News and RatDog, and were signed by Capricorn Records, releasing the CD, Thread, in 1998, which was produced by Grammy Award winner Joe Chiccarelli. Box Set released a total of 12 recordings between 1991 and 2006.

Box Set continued with a rigorous touring schedule, performing with groups such as Dave Matthews Band, Barenaked Ladies, Lenny Kravitz, Willie Nelson, Hot Tuna, Blues Traveler, and the Goo Goo Dolls, until 2004, when their touring pace slowed, in part due to Brunberg's moving to Portland in 2002, and eventually entering law school (though he never pursued a law career, opting instead to open Mississippi Studios recording studio/music venue). In 2006, Box Set performed its last show at the Sweetwater Saloon in Mill Valley, CA. Jeff subsequently worked in marketing for a merger and acquisitions firm in San Francisco before eventually creating another band in 2009, The Fall Risk, composed of Jeff Pehrson (guitar, vocals), Jeff Ballard (harmonica, percussion), Matt Twain (keyboards, vocals), Mark Abbott (drums) and Eddie Berljafa (bass). In 2010, The Fall Risk added Sam Johnston (organ, accordion, pedal steel) and Rich Goldstein (rhythm, lead, and slide guitar), and in 2011, added "Fiddle" Dave Muhlethaler (fiddle, mandolin) and Phil Savell (lead guitar). In 2012, "Fiddle" Dave Muhlethaler left the band, followed by Jeff Ballard and Eddie Berljafa in 2013, at which time Mike Sugar began playing bass.

In 1997, Box Set's "Can't Save Myself" (written by Jeff Pehrson) appeared on the soundtrack for the movie, Trial and Error.

In 2001, Pehrson played a biker named Snake in the movie, Christmas in the Clouds.

In 2003, Pehrson wrote songs and performed vocals on Jack Casady's first solo album, Dream Factor.

In late 2009, Furthur decided to add backing vocals to their newly formed band, enlisting Zoe Ellis and Sunshine Becker. After Zoe left the group in early 2010 to focus on her a cappella ensemble, SoVoSó, Jeff was recruited as her replacement and debuted on May 24, 2010.

In early 2012, Jeff Pehrson and Jim Brunberg performed together for the first time since 2006 with a Box Set Duo reunion and later played a 7 night run in June 2012 at McMenamins Al's Den in Portland, OR.

In March 2013, The Fall Risk began recording their first CD at TRI Studios, which was released on August 1, 2013.

== Personal life ==
In 2021, Jeff was married to cannabis educator, policy advocate, and Rolling Stone contributor, Sara Mitra Payan. When not performing with Furthur, Box Set or The Fall Risk, Jeff enjoys riding his Harley-Davidson motorcycle, jet-skiing, reading political satire, sampling regional wines, and traveling with Sara.He is also involved in music and live performances with various bands.

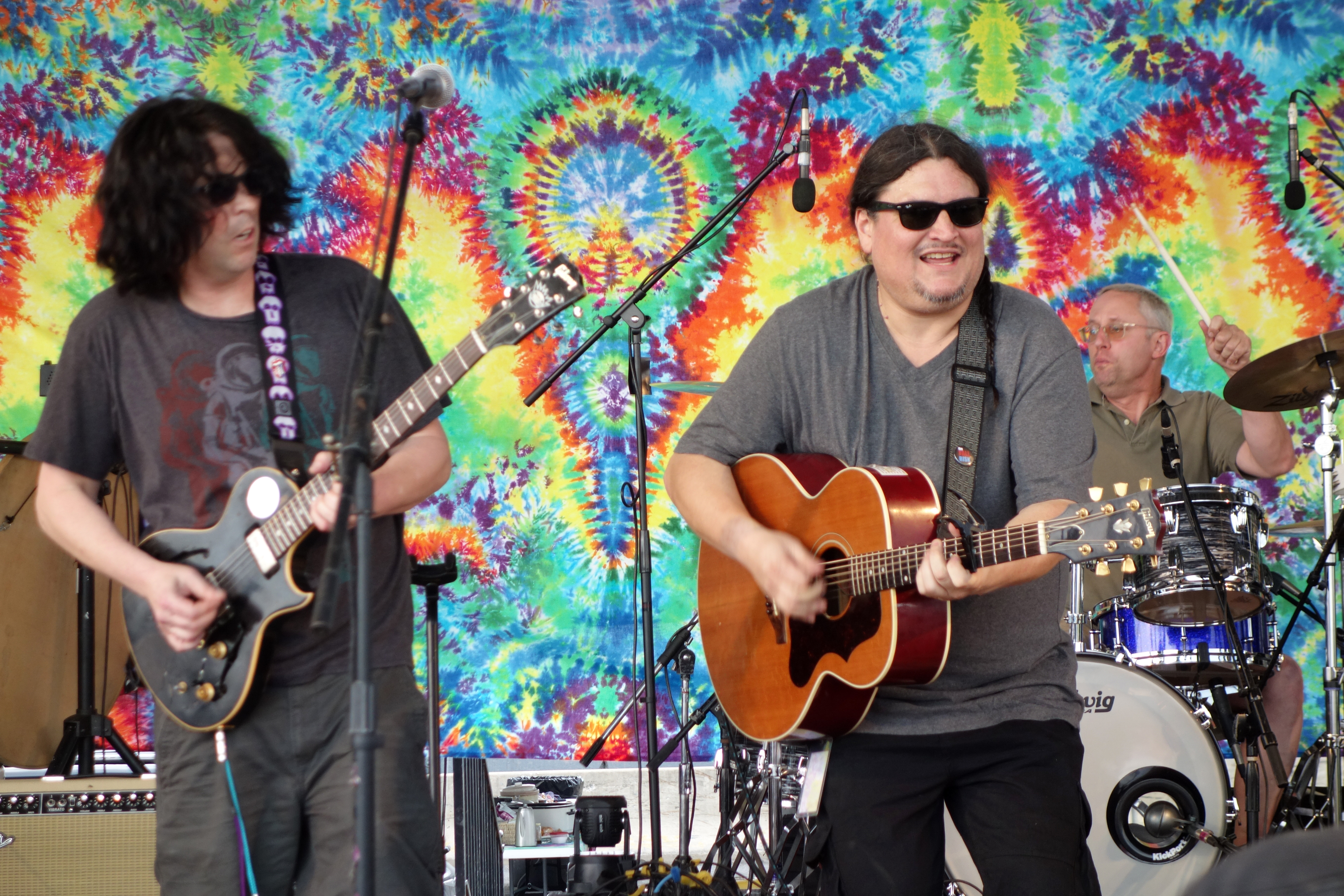
Jeff Pehrson, performing with his group, The Fall Risk, August 2, 2013 at A Bear's Picnic in Hughesville, PA.

== Discography ==
=== Box Set ===
- Box Set (Cassette, 1991)
- Box Set (Cassette, 1992)
- On The Busk (Cassette, 1992)
- Box Set (CD, 1994)
- Twenty-seven (CD, 1995)
- Live Bait (Cassette, 1996)
- Mean Time (EP CD, 1996)
- Back To You (CD Single, 1998)
- Thread (CD, 1998)
- Live Duo (CD, 1999)
- Lemonade (CD, 2000)
- X (pronounced "Ten") (CD, 2001)
- Live Duo 2 (CD, 2003)
- Live Trio (CD, 2015)
- Three Wise Guys (CD, 2019)

=== The Fall Risk ===
- "The Fall Risk, Volume No. 1" (CD, 2013)

== Awards ==
- 1994: "Honor Roll of America's Unsigned Talent" – Billboard Magazine
- 1995: "Group of the Year" – National Academy of Songwriters
- 1997: "Bay Area Club Band of the Year (public write-in)" – Bay Area Music Awards ("Bammies")
- 1997: "Americana/Roots Band" – Bay Area Music Awards ("Bammies")
