= Scott Larned =

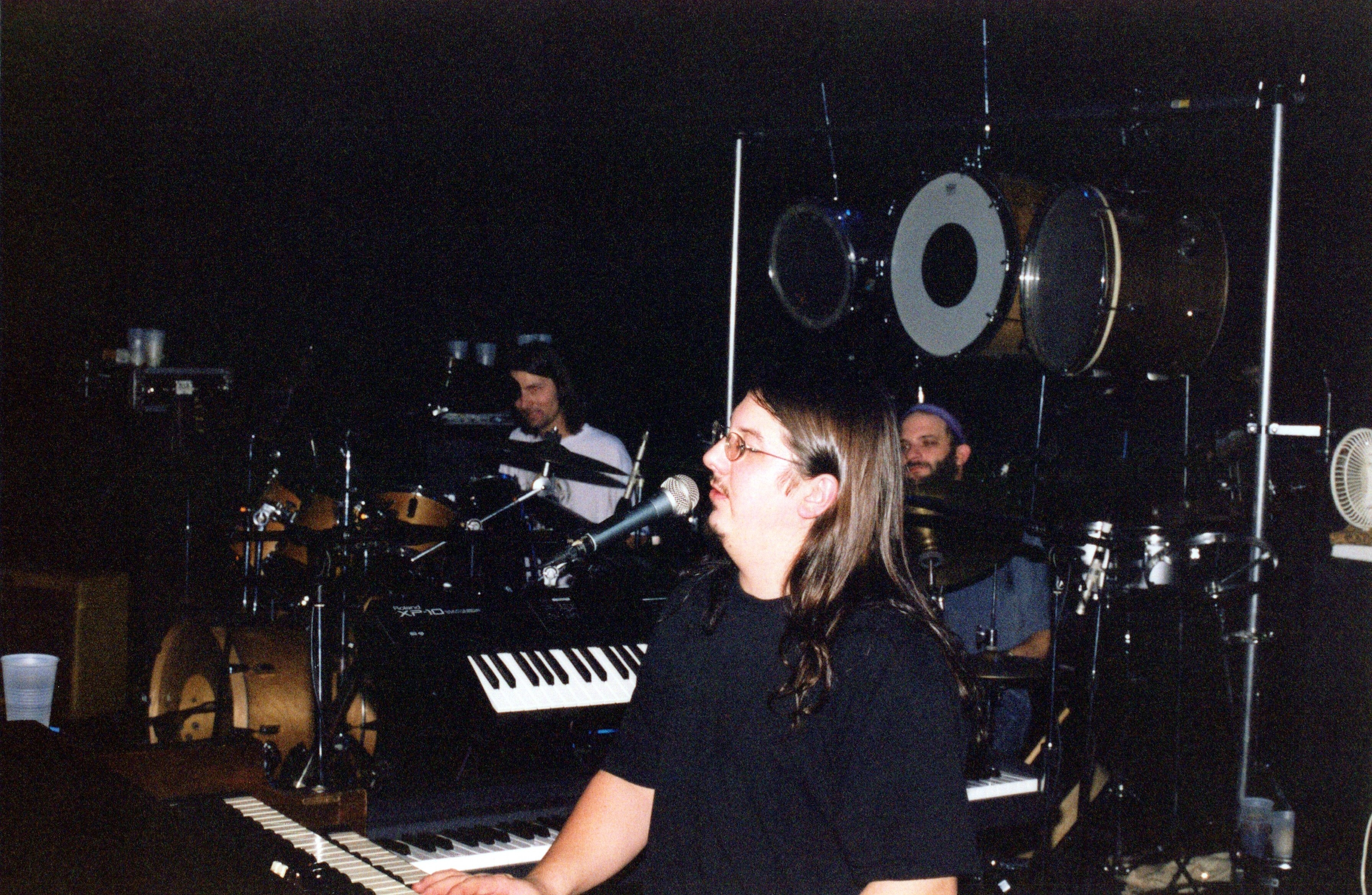
- Scott Larned plays the Hammond B3 at Martyrs', Chicago on January 21st, 2000

Background information
- Born: July 3, 1969
- Origin: Chicago, Illinois, U.S.
- Died: April 24, 2005 (aged 35)
- Genres: Rock
- Occupation: Musician
- Instrument: Keyboards
- Years active: 1997–2005
- Formerly of: Dark Star Orchestra

Scott Larned (3 July 1969 – 24 April 2005) was the keyboardist and founding member of Dark Star Orchestra, a popular Grateful Dead tribute band. He also played with Brother Brother, Freddy Jones Band, Citrus, Smoking Fish, and Hackenwheeze.

== Dark Star Orchestra ==
Born July 3, 1969, Scott grew up in suburban Chicago and took piano lessons at a young age before playing with a succession of local bands in the Chicago area while holding a teaching position. His extensive gigging brought him in contact with a variety of musicians, one of whom was John Kadlecik, formally of Wingnut. John and Scott both had similar ideas for the creation of a band which would play full setlists culled from the long career of the Grateful Dead.

In late 1997, they started planning four shows which would introduce this format. On November 11, 1997, the first of these shows was held at the Chicago nightclub, Martyrs'. After the third and fourth shows were sold-out, the concept was continued and Scott became the band's first manager, booking agent and publicist. Eventually Scott quit his teaching job and started touring nationally with the group, all the while performing his managerial duties. He ushered in a new era in the band's growth, helping move them from small clubs to large venues and garnering favorable reviews in national papers and magazines before an outside manager was hired in early 2004.

On the afternoon of April 24, 2005, Scott died of heart failure while on tour with Dark Star Orchestra in his hotel room in Virginia after the last of two shows held at the State Theater in Falls Church. His memorial, held in Kenilworth, Illinois, was attended by the many musicians he had befriended during his musical career including Donna Jean Godchaux of the Grateful Dead. He was eventually replaced on keyboards by former keyboardist for the Other Ones and the Dead, Rob Barraco.
