= Dark Star Orchestra =

American tribute band

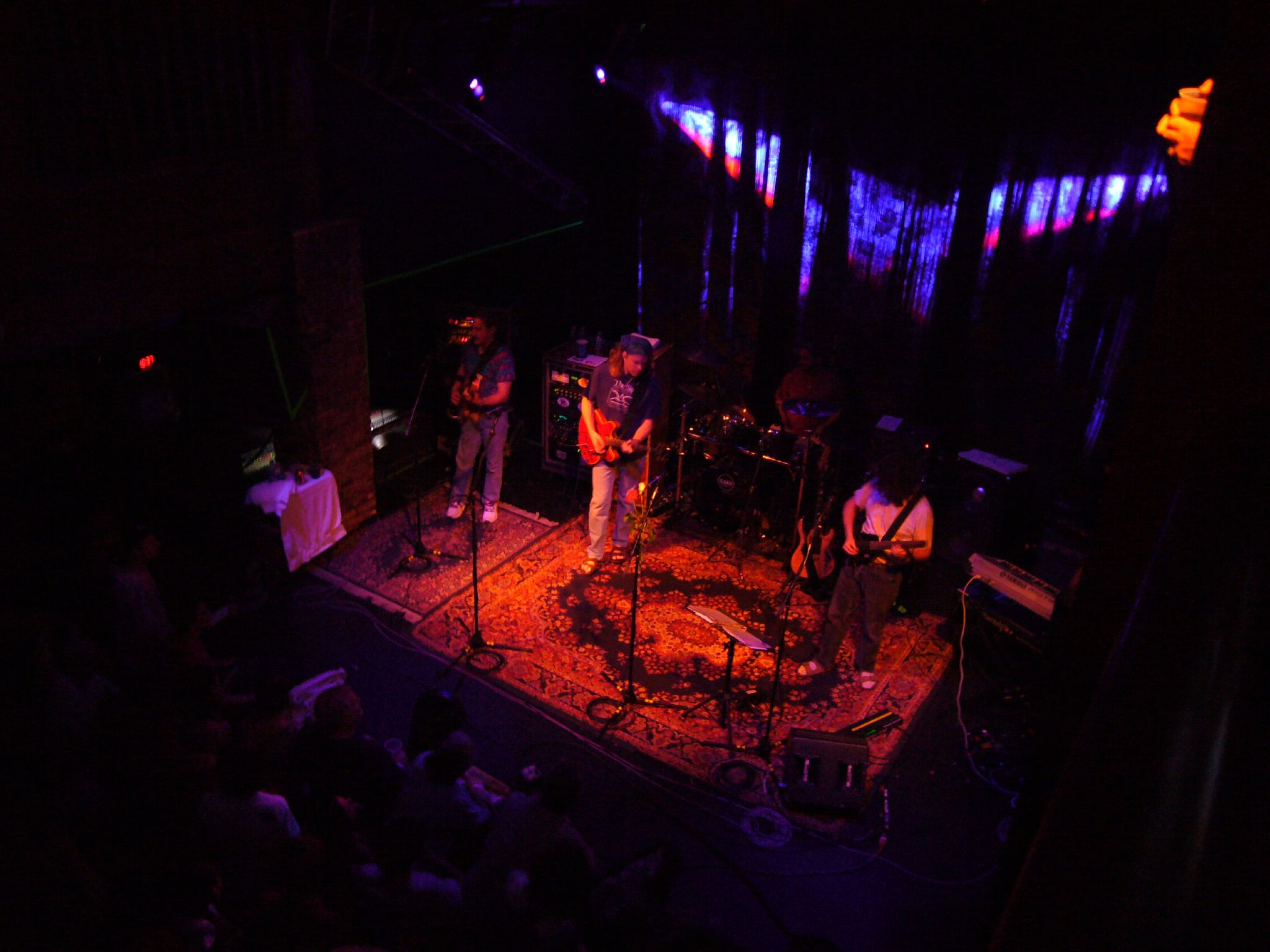
- Dark Star Orchestra performing on February 14, 2007, at Freebird Live.

Background information
- Origin: Chicago, Illinois, USA
- Genres: Rock, psychedelic rock, jam band
- Years active: 1997–present
- Members: Lisa Mackey; Skip Vangelas; Rob Koritz; Dino English; Rob Eaton; Rob Barraco; Jeff Mattson
- Past members: John Kadlecik; Scott Larned; Mike Maraat; Ahmer Nizam; Michael Hazdra; Kevin Rosen; Dan Klepinger; Stu Allen; Jim Allard; Mark Corsolini
- Website: http://www.darkstarorchestra.net

Dark Star Orchestra is a Grateful Dead tribute band formed in Chicago, Illinois. They serve now as an international touring tribute band to the rock group the Grateful Dead. Since 1997, the band has been "celebrating the Grateful Dead concert experience."

== Overview ==
Dark Star Orchestra performs shows from among the nearly 2,500 concerts of the Grateful Dead during their 30-year tenure performing improvisational rock. On most, though not all of their performances, Dark Star Orchestra presents the complete original set list, song by song, and in order, while adapting their phrasing, voice arrangements and specific musical equipment for the various eras of the Grateful Dead shows in which they perform.

Members of the Grateful Dead themselves, including rhythm guitarist/singer Bob Weir, bassist Phil Lesh, drummer Bill Kreutzmann, vocalist Donna Jean Godchaux and keyboardists Vince Welnick and Tom Constanten, have all appeared on stage and performed with Dark Star Orchestra. In November 2011, the group played its 2,000th show in Ithaca, New York.

== History ==
Dark Star Orchestra has been playing live shows together since 1997, after guitarist John Kadlecik contacted keyboardist Scott Larned with a concept (introduced by a common friend Andrew "Tiny" Dofner): performing complete Grateful Dead shows out of history. When Scott mentioned having the same idea, John knew they were on to something. Since forming, the band has performed over 3,200 shows.

On lead guitar and vocals, John Kadlecik used amp rigs and equipment to imitate guitar tone of Jerry Garcia from the show being recreated. When a 70s show is being performed, vocalist Lisa Mackey provides Donna Jean Godchaux's female harmonies and, since 2012, plays Harmonica on the Ron "Pigpen" McKernan tunes.

Dino English delivers the rhythmic drumming sounds of Bill Kreutzmann. On the other drum set, Rob Koritz, fills the Mickey Hart role. Skip Vangelas provides a style of bass playing similar to that of Phil Lesh. Rob Eaton performs rhythm guitar and vocals in the style of Bob Weir.

In November 1998, on the eve of their first anniversary, Mike Gordon and Jon Fishman of Phish joined DSO at Martyrs' after their own show. Fishman sat in for the majority of the evening, which included a drum section with four percussionists. The ensuing buzz caused national interest in the band. That winter, their Colorado tour sold out almost every stop and soon after, The Washington Post declared them "the hottest Grateful Dead tribute act going"; USA Today claimed DSO was "channeling the Dead" but what they do is not just a tribute to the Grateful Dead but a testament to the enormous number of unique set lists the band performed in their long career.

Continuing their growth, DSO has performed up to 200 dates in a year. Their popularity has grown continually, playing at larger venues and theaters, collaborating with guests including Grateful Dead alumni Bob Weir, Phil Lesh, Bill Kreutzmann, Donna Jean Godchaux-Mackay, Vince Welnick and Tom Constanten.

On 29 October 2004, Dark Star Orchestra played their 1,000th show at Carolina Theatre in Greensboro, N.C. The show did not adhere to a particular Grateful Dead setlist but was instead composed of highlights from throughout the Dead's history. The show was recorded by the DSO crew and distributed as a 3-CD set.

In 2008, Dark Star Orchestra performed over 150 shows throughout the U.S. In addition to the complete Grateful Dead show selections, the band has been known to incorporate Jerry Garcia Band show setlists as well as original set lists of their own choosing.

During the band's Spring tour in 2005, co-founder Scott Larned died of a heart attack on April 24. The band reeled for a while, featuring the talents of guest keyboardists, including Dan Klepinger and Tom Ryan, until selecting Rob Barraco as a permanent replacement in 2007.

In 2009 John Kadlecik joined a new band with original Grateful Dead members Phil Lesh and Bob Weir called Furthur. On November 16, 2009, he officially announced that he was leaving Dark Star Orchestra. His final show with the band was on December 5, 2009. For DSO's 2009–10 winter shows, he was replaced by guitarist Jeff Mattson of the Zen Tricksters and the Donna Jean Godchaux Band. Mattson now is the permanent guitarist for DSO.

On May 3, 2013, it was announced that bassist Kevin Rosen would be leaving the band. He was quoted as saying "After all my years of touring with Dark Star Orchestra, I find myself in need of an extended break from life on the road. In addition, my mother’s declining health makes it even more important to be home at this time."

The band had its 25th anniversary tour in fall 2022.

== Members ==
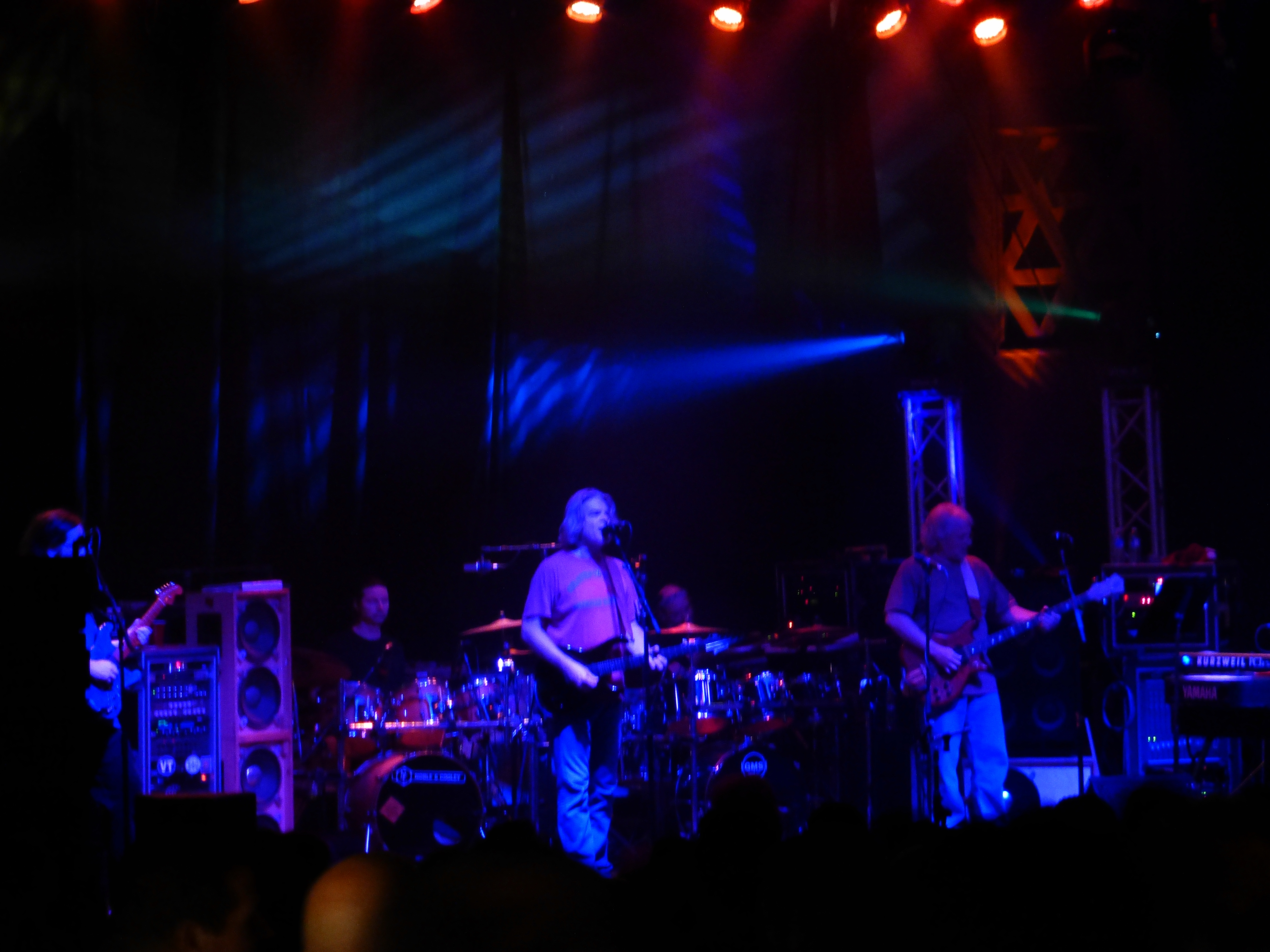
Dark Star Orchestra performing at The Westcott Theater in Syracuse, New York, on December 1, 2014

=== Current members ===
- Lisa Mackey – vocals, (1997–present) & Harmonica (2012 - present)
- Rob Koritz – drums, percussion (1999–present)
- Dino English – drums, percussion (1999–present)
- Rob Eaton – rhythm guitar, vocals (2001–present)
- Rob Barraco – keyboards, vocals (some shows in 2005 and 2006, 2007–present)
- Jeff Mattson – lead guitar, vocals (one show in 2005, 2009–2010, 2010–present)
- Skip Vangelas – bass, vocals (some shows in 2001, 2013–present)

=== Former members ===
- Kevin Rosen – bass, vocals (1997–1998, 2000–2013)
- John Kadlecik – lead guitar, vocals (1997–2009)
- Scott Larned – keyboards, vocals (1997–2005, deceased)
- Mike Maraat – rhythm guitar, vocals (1997–1999)
- Ahmer Nizam – drums (1997–1999)
- Michael Hazdra – bass, vocals (1998–2000, some shows in 2001)
- Mark Corsolini – drums (1998–1999)

=== Touring substitutes/guests ===
- Dave "Chopper" Campbell – rhythm guitar, vocals (some shows in 2000)
- John Sabal – rhythm guitar, vocals (some shows in 2000)
- Bustar – rhythm guitar, vocals (some shows in 2000)
- Jim Harris – rhythm guitar, vocals (some shows in 2000 and 2001)
- David Berg – rhythm guitar, vocals (some shows in 2000 and 2001)
- Gregg Koerner – bass, vocals (some shows in 2001)
- Tom Ryan – keyboards, vocals (some shows in 2005)
- Dan Klepinger – keyboards, vocals (some shows in 2005, 2006 and 2007)
- Stu Allen – lead guitar, vocals (some shows in 2010)
- Jim Allard – bass, vocals (2013 summer tours)
- Jeff Chimenti – keyboards, vocals (some shows in 2016)

== Tours ==
=== 2008 ===
- 1500 And Counting Tour
- European Tour
- Spring Tour
- Road To The Roo Tour
- All Good Vibes Tour
- Like A Tumbleweed Tour
- Red Caravan Tour
- Cosmic New Year's Run

=== 2009 ===
- Winter Tour
- Spring Tour West
- Spring Tour East
- Summer Tour
- Rex Caravan Tour
- Fall Tour
- Cosmic New Year's Run

=== 2010 ===
- Southbound Winter Tour
- One Way Or Another Tour
- Seeds Of Light Tour
- Rock My Soul Summer Tour
- A Slingshot On Mars Tour
- Wings A Mile Long Tour
- From A City Near You Tour
- Cosmic New Year's Run

=== 2011 ===
- Southbound Winter Tour
- Four Winds Tour
- Into The Sun Tour
- Hearts Of Summer Tour
- Last Rose Of Summer Tour
- Fall Tour
- Cosmic New Year's Run

=== 2012 ===
- Southbound Winter Tour
- European Tour
- Spring Tour West
- Spring Tour East
- Meet Me At The Jubilee Summer Tour
- Fall Tour West
- Fall Tour East
- Cosmic New Year's Run

=== 2013 ===
- Winter Tour
- Spring Tour West
- Spring Tour East
- Summer Tour Midwest
- Summer Tour Northeast
- Fall Tour West
- Fall Tour East
- Cosmic New Year's Run

=== 2014 ===
- Winter tour
- Spring tour east
- Fall tour east

=== 2015 ===
- Special Acoustic Show at Terrapin Crossroads
- Spring Tour West
- Rob Eaton to perform with The Rocky Mountain Grateful Dead Revue
- Rob Eaton to perform with Axile Tilt
- Special Acoustic Show in Washington, D.C.
- Spring Tour East
- Dark Star Jubilee
- Mattson, Barraco & Friends
- 3 Special JGB Shows
- Summer Tour
