= Jeff Mattson =

American musician (born 1958)

Jeff Mattson (born July 3, 1958) is an American musician. He was raised on Long Island, NY.

Mattson is founding member of the jam band, the Zen Tricksters, and guitarist in the Donna Jean Godchaux Band with Jeff Mattson, which features the Grateful Dead’s Donna Jean Godchaux. Mattson was named the permanent lead guitarist for Dark Star Orchestra in November of 2009. A veteran of 30 years on the road, Mattson is a guitar player whose style ranges from rock & roll to blues, bluegrass, country, jazz, folk and psychedelia. Jeff is also a strong original songwriter and his work is prominently featured on five albums, including several pieces co-written with bandmate Donna Jean. He is a co-writer of “Leave Me Out of This,” a track on Phil Lesh and Friends Sony CD, "There and Back Again." Jeff was asked to audition for Phil Lesh & Friends in the fall of 1999 and in October 1999. Jeff and then Zen Trickster keyboard player, Rob Barraco, played three shows with Phil Lesh and Friends at the Warfield Theater in San Francisco. 1999.

== Discography ==
with the Zen Tricksters
1996 The Holy Fool
1998 A Love Surreal
2003 Shaking Off the Weirdness
2006 For Rex: The Black Tie Dye Ball – The Zen Tricksters w/ Donna Godchaux, Mickey Hart, Tom Constanten, David Nelson, Michael Falzarano, Rob Barraco 2006
with Donna Jean and the Tricksters
2008 Donna Jean and the Tricksters
with Donna Jean Godchaux Band
2014 Back Around
song Leave Me Out of This, co-written with Rob Barraco
2002 Phil Lesh and Friends "There and Back Again"
