= Sunshine Becker =

American singer (born 1972)

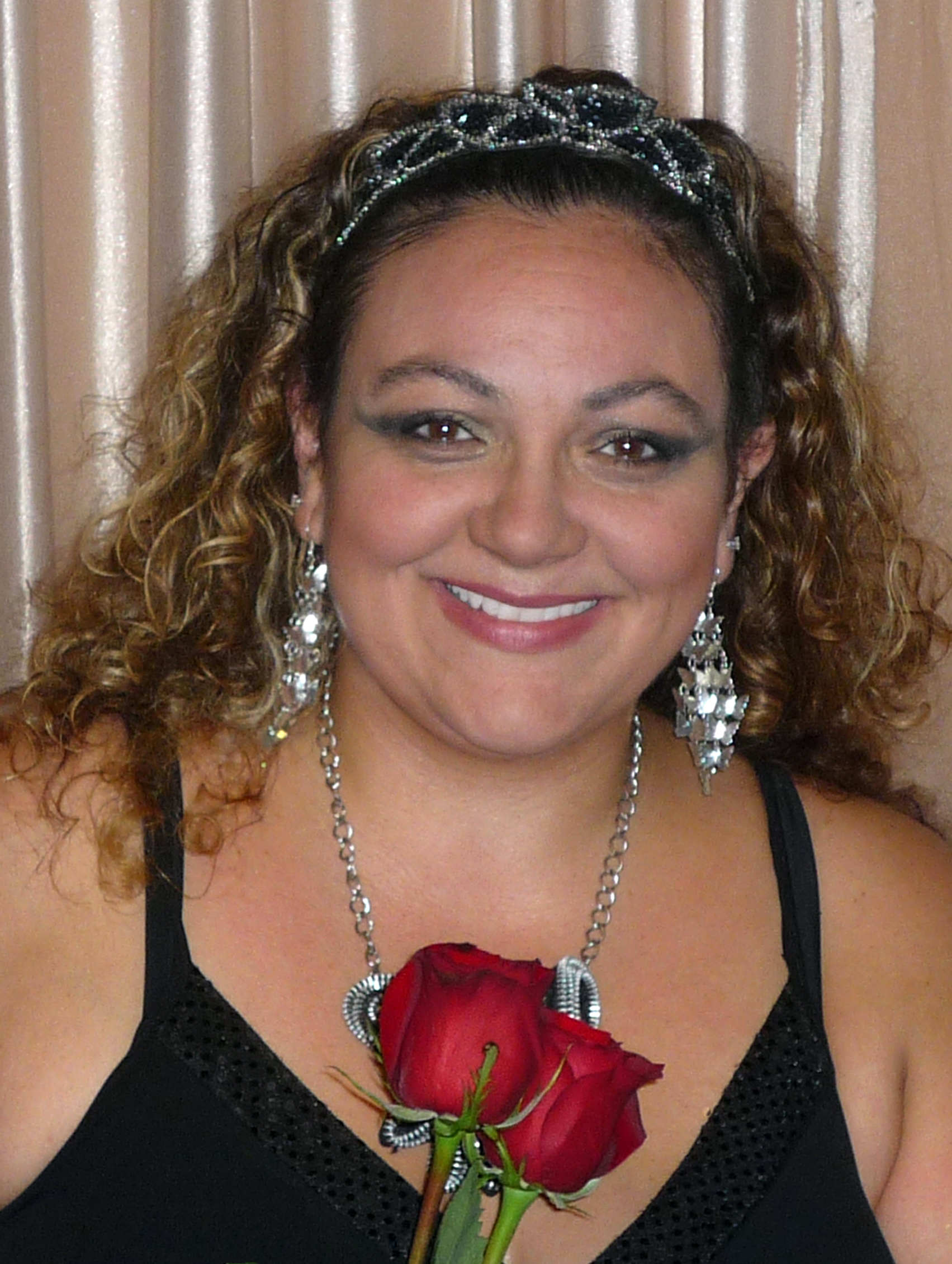
- Sunshine Becker July 23, 2011 @ Mann Center (Philadelphia) with Furthur

Background information
- Also known as: Sunshine (Garcia) Becker
- Born: Sunshine Flower Garcia; July 1, 1972 (age 54); Oakland, California
- Genres: Rock, jazz, gospel, R&B
- Occupation: Singer
- Instrument: Vocals Flute
- Years active: 1992–present
- Website: furthur.net

Sunshine Becker (b. 1 July 1972) is an American singer who performed backing vocals for the band Furthur. Despite her maiden name, Garcia, she is not related to Jerry Garcia, an incorrect assumption made by some because of her involvement with Furthur, a post-Garcia incarnation of the Grateful Dead. Similarly, despite her first name, Sunshine, she is not to be confused with Sunshine Kesey, daughter of Ken Kesey and Carolyn Adams (aka Mountain Girl or MG), Jerry Garcia's second wife.

== Early life ==
Sunshine Flower Garcia was born in Oakland, California, to Gabriel Garcia and Juddee Kawaiola (née Watrous). Her father, who is of Hispanic descent, is from New Mexico and is a musician, playing primarily tenor saxophone, but also guitar, bass, piano, and drums. Her mother, who is of Dutch, French, and English descent, is from San Francisco, and studied theater in college.

Sunshine's parents met and married in Oakland, CA. She has a brother, Sean Gabriel Garcia, who is 4 years older, and who selected the middle name, Flower, for her when she was born. She grew up in the East Bay area in Oakland, CA and attended James Logan High School in Union City, CA, where she graduated in 1990.

== Musical career ==
In the sixth grade, at 11 years of age, Sunshine learned to play the recorder and flute. As a freshman in high school, she joined the school's prestigious marching band, eventually becoming the flute/woodwind section leader and in 1988, they won a competition at the Fiesta Bowl. Following high school, Sunshine attended California State University in Hayward, CA from 1990 to 1992, majoring in Expressive Arts. Having left Cal State, she moved into a house in San Francisco with several other aspiring musicians, including Jeff Pehrson, Jim Brunberg (of Box Set) and Jay Shaffer (of Passenger). Over the next few years, Sunshine worked variously as a vocalist with Oakland Youth Chorus' touring a cappella ensemble Vocal Motion, jam bands Passenger and Box Set, the funky drummer Ziggy Modeliste, and as a studio session singer. She ultimately concentrated her efforts in 1995 with SoVoSó (meaning "from the SOul to the VOice to the SOng"), a highly acclaimed improvisational a cappella group which evolved from Bobby McFerrin's vocal ensemble, Voicestra. She remains very active with SoVoSó and continues to perform on occasion with Passenger. She also functions as an instructor for Young Performers International, a nonprofit children's performing arts company in San Francisco, leads ongoing workshops teaching the art-form of CircleSinging, and provides private vocal coaching.

In late 2009, Furthur decided to add backing vocals to their newly formed band. Zoe Ellis, a well-known Bay Area vocalist who has been a member of SoVoSó since 2005, was initially approached by the band, as she had previously been a backing vocalist for Phil Lesh and Friends, having performed on the 1999 album, Love Will See You Through. Zoe, who is the sister of Dave Ellis, former saxophonist for Bob Weir's RatDog, accepted the offer to join Furthur. However, her friend and former singing partner, Caitlin Cornwell, who was also approached by Furthur (and who also provided backing vocals for Phil and Friends and who is a former member of SoVoSó), was not able to commit. As an alternative choice, Zoe recommended Sunshine, her friend and singing partner from SoVoSó (and a longtime fan of the Grateful Dead), who readily accepted. Sunshine's and Zoe's audition for Furthur occurred at the Philharmonia benefit concert in San Francisco on December 20, 2009, where they performed with Lesh, Weir, and Jackie Greene. The backup vocalists' debut Furthur show was on December 30, 2009 (although they also performed at the live rehearsal sessions at the Mill Valley Masonic Center on December 27 and 28). Zoe toured with Furthur until March 12, 2010; Jeff Pehrson subsequently joined Furthur as a backing vocalist on May 24, 2010.

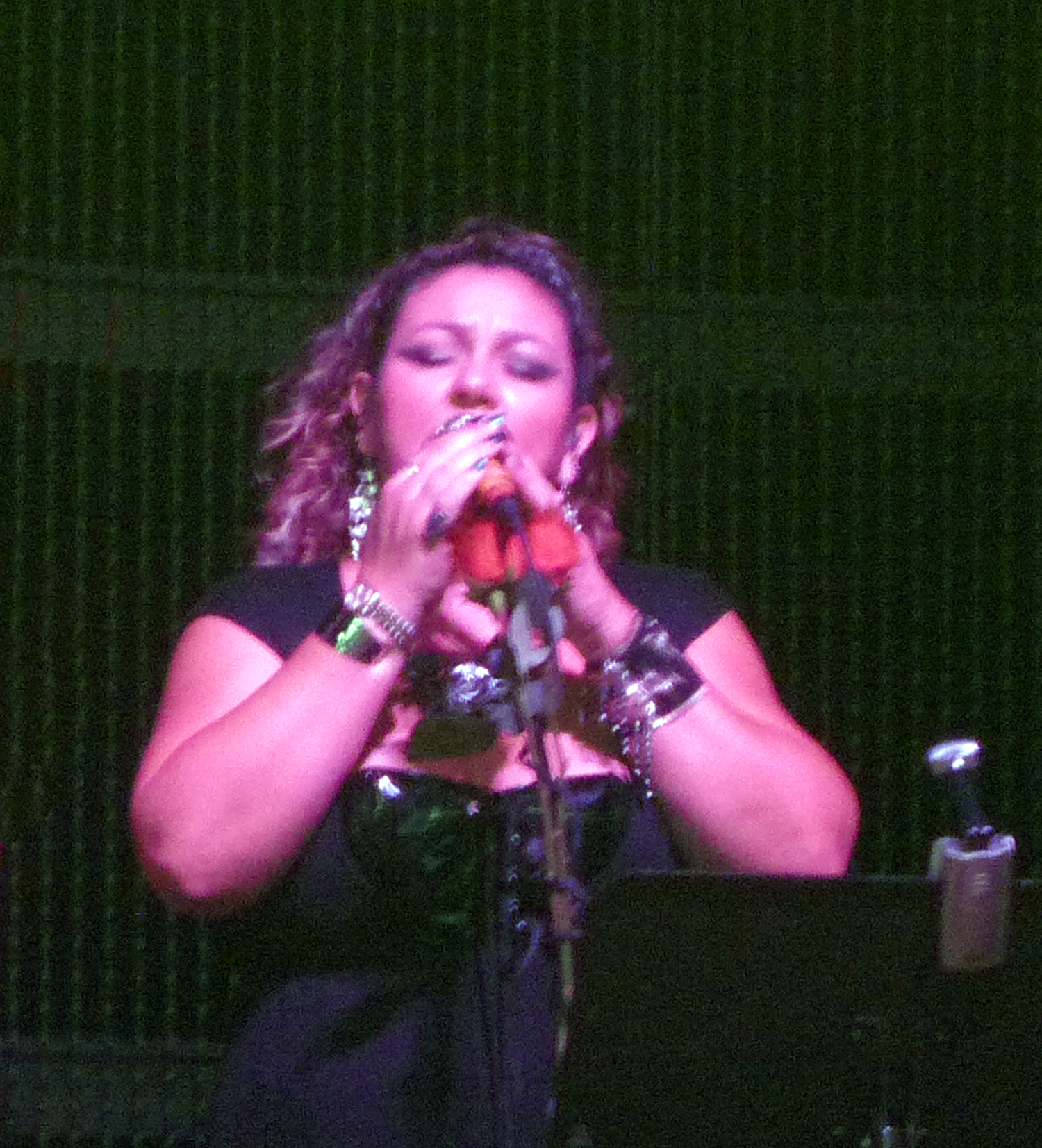
Sunshine performing with Furthur at the Mann Center for the Performing Arts in Philadelphia on July 23, 2011.

On November 21, 2008, December 26, 2009, and January 28, 2011, Sunshine sang the national anthem before the Oakland Golden State Warriors basketball games, and on April 6, 2010, before the Oakland Athletics baseball game. On December 12, 2010, she performed, along with Phil Lesh, Bob Weir, Jackie Greene, and Jeff Pehrson, at the annual Philharmonia benefit concert in San Francisco. She also appeared on December 3, 2011, at Run for the Roses: A One-of-a-Kind Musical Evening, a Rex Foundation benefit show, where she, along with John Kadlecik, Melvin Seals, Greg Anton and Robin Sylvester, performed a Jerry Garcia Band tribute set.

== Personal life ==
Sunshine attended her first Grateful Dead show on May 25, 1992, at Shoreline Amphitheatre in Mountain View, CA. She first met her future husband, bass player-turned-executive salesman Bill Becker (who played in Passenger), that same year, and then reconnected with him in 1999. They married on September 29, 2001, and had a son, Geddy Becker (named after Rush bass player, Geddy Lee), on June 8, 2009.

When not singing, touring, and teaching, Sunshine spends her time writing her own songs, exploring the outdoors, experiencing live music, and enjoying her family at home in the Bay Area.

== Discography ==
=== SoVoSó ===
- "World Jazz A Cappella" (1997)
- "Truth & Other Stories" (1998)
- "Bridges" (2000)
- "Seasonings" (2002)
- "Crack The Nut!" (2004)
- "Then & Now" (2005)
- "Snowflakes" (2009)

== Awards ==
=== SoVoSó ===
- 1997: National Champions, Harmony Sweepstakes A Cappella Festival
- 1997: Winner, Studio Album of the Year - "World Jazz A Cappella", Contemporary A Cappella Recording Awards
- 1999: Winner, Izzy, Outstanding Achievement In Music - "Mother May I" (for score, with Robert Moses' Kin Dance troupe), Isadora Duncan Dance Awards
- 1999: Nominee, Best Jazz Album - "Truth & Other Stories", Contemporary A Cappella Recording Awards
