= The Fall Risk, Volume No. 1 =

Studio album by The Fall Risk
- Released: August 1, 2013
- Recorded: March, 2013 TRI Studios and Salamander Sound, San Rafael, California, United States
- Genre: Americana/folk rock
- Length: 35:28
- Label: The Fall Risk
- Producer: Chris Manning

The Fall Risk, Volume No. 1 is the eponymous debut album by the band The Fall Risk. The album began production in March 2013 and was officially released on August 1, 2013, coinciding with the birthday of Jerry Garcia ("Jerry Day").

== Track listing ==
1. "Cross My Heart" (Jeff Pehrson) – 4:16
2. "Wendy Ann" (Pehrson) – 4:14
3. "Angeline" (Pehrson) – 4:22
4. "Hollow" (Pehrson) – 3:50
5. "LeClair" (Pehrson) – 3:23
6. "Ode" (Pehrson) – 4:28
7. "Cry" (Pehrson) – 3:31
8. "Cry Baby Cry" (Pehrson) – 3:07
9. "HBWA" (Pehrson) – 4:17

== Personnel ==
The Fall Risk

- Jeff Pehrson — acoustic guitar, vocals
- Phil Savell – lead guitar, rhythm guitar, resonator guitar
- Mark Abbott – drums, percussion
- Sammy Johnston – organ, accordion, harmonica, Mellotron, vocals
- Rich Goldstein — slide guitar, lead guitar, rhythm guitar
- Matt Twain – piano, keyboards, vocals
- Mike Sugar – bass

Special Guests

- Tony Furtado — banjo and bottleneck slide on "LeClair"
- Jason Crosby — fiddle on "Angeline"

Production

- Produced by Chris Manning
- Executive producer: R. Cooper Gruen
- Recorded at TRI Studios and Salamander Sound
- Artwork and design: Gelsey Maslanka
- Social media and PR: BANDAID Social Media
- All songs written & Copyright Controlled by Jeff Pehrson (Oenophile Music, ASCAP)
