= The Fall Risk =

American folk rock band

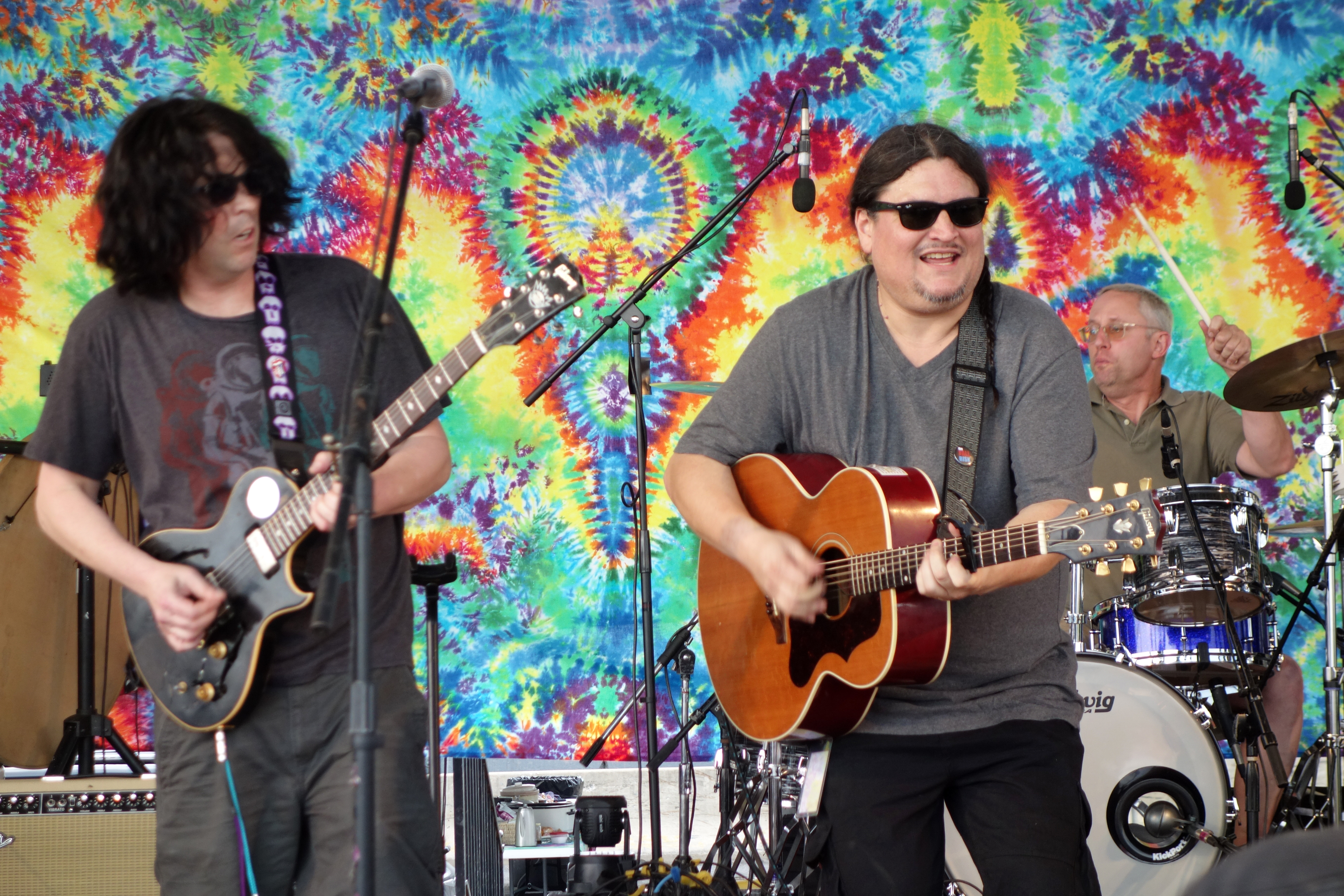
- Jeff Pehrson, Phil Savell, and Mark Abbott from The Fall Risk at "A Bear's Picnic" in Hughesville, PA on August 2, 2013

Background information
- Origin: San Francisco, California
- Genres: Folk rock, Americana
- Years active: 2009-present
- Members: Jeff Pehrson; Matt Twain; Mark Abbott; Sammy Johnston; Mike Sugar; Rich Goldstein; Phil Savell
- Past members: Dave Moffat "Fiddle" Dave Muhlethaler; Jeff Ballard; Eddie Berljafa
- Website: TheFallRisk.com

The Fall Risk is an American folk rock band founded by Furthur vocalist Jeff Pehrson in 2009.

== History ==
=== Box Set (1991–2006) ===
Jeff Pehrson, currently a backup vocalist for Furthur, began playing guitar and writing original songs in 1985 while matriculating at San Francisco State University. In 1987, along with keyboardist/vocalist friend Matt Twain, the Twain & Pehrson Duo began playing regular gigs at San Francisco's The Owl and the Monkey Cafe. In 1991, singer-songwriter Jim Brunberg joined the duo, forming the folk rock band, Box Set, that began performing locally, and after establishing a growing loyal fan base, regionally. Twain, who was unable to travel due to his day job, left the band, leaving the Box Set Duo, which still continues to perform on occasion in the Bay Area and Portland. The increasingly popular duo, whose expressive songwriting and resonant harmonies have prompted comparisons to Simon & Garfunkel, decided to broaden their sound by adding drummer Matt Abbott and bass player Chad Heise in 1993 and keyboardist/harmonicist/accordionist Sam Johnston in 1994. Box Set toured continuously until 2004, when their touring pace slowed, in part due to Brunberg's relocating to Portland and matriculating in law school, and performed its last show in 2006. During its career, Box Set released a total of 12 recordings, was recognized by Billboard on their "Honor Roll of Unsigned Talent" in 1994, was named "Group of the Year" by the National Academy of Songwriters in 1995, and won two Bay Area Music Awards ("Bammies") for "Best Club Band" and "Outstanding Americana/Roots Band" in 1997.

=== The Fall Risk (2009–present) ===
While working in a merger and acquisitions firm in San Francisco, Pehrson became inspired to start another band. In February 2009, he recruited former Box Set members Matt Twain (keyboards, vocals) and Mark Abbott (drums) as well as former college friends Eddie Berljafa (bass) and Jeff Ballard (harmonica, percussion) to form The Fall Risk, which debuted on June 20, 2009 at the San Gregorio General Store. Following the band's debut, Berljafa left to pursue playing blues in San Jose, and was replaced by Dave Moffat. In early 2010, while developing his band, Pehrson became one of two backup vocalists for Furthur, a jam band formed in 2009 by former Grateful Dead members, Bob Weir and Phil Lesh, with whom he still performs. Shortly thereafter in 2010, The Fall Risk added former Box Set member Sam Johnston (organ, accordion, pedal steel) and Rich Goldstein (rhythm/lead/slide guitar) (who performs with drummer Mark Abbott in his band Little Muddy) and added "Fiddle" Dave Muhlethaler (fiddle, mandolin) and Phil Savell (lead guitar) in 2011; Eddie Berljafa returned to the band, replacing Dave Moffat at that time, as well. Muhlethaler left the band in 2012, followed by Ballard and Berljafa in 2013, at which time Mike Sugar (bass) began. Although the band has performed primarily in the Bay Area, they embarked on a Mid-Atlantic mini-tour in early August, 2013, coinciding with the release of their debut CD.

== Musical style ==
The Fall Risk performs original songs written by Jeff Pehrson, both during his time with Box Set and with The Fall Risk, as well as occasional covers of bands such as Grateful Dead, The Beatles, The Who, Traffic, Jimi Hendrix and Van Morrison. Their songs, which embody a combination of evocative, poetic lyrics and infectious, uplifting melodies, are performed in an Americana/roots/folk rock style.

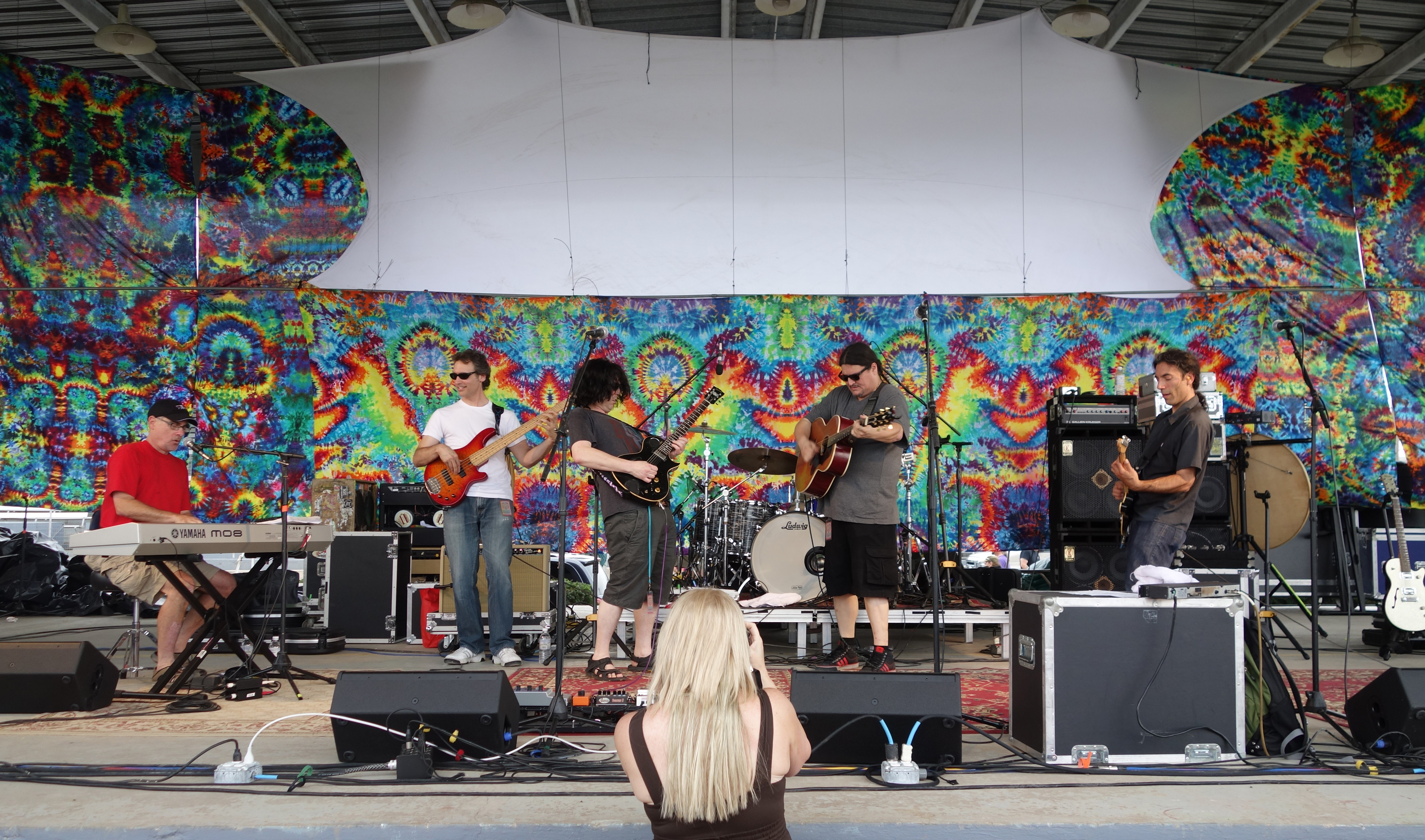
The Fall Risk performing at A Bear's Picnic in Hughesville, PA on August 2, 2013.

== Personnel ==
Current members

- Jeff Pehrson—rhythm guitar, vocals (2009–present)
- Matt Twain—keyboard, vocals (2009–present)
- Mark Abbott—drums (2009–present)
- Sammy Johnston—organ, accordion, pedal steel, harmonica (2010–present)
- Mike Sugar—bass (2013–present)
- Rich Goldstein—slide guitar, rhythm guitar, lead guitar (2010–present)
- Phil Savell—lead guitar (2011–present)

Former members

- Dave Moffat—bass (2009-2011)
- "Fiddle" Dave Muhlthaler—fiddle, mandolin, rhythm guitar (2011-2012)
- Jeff Ballard—harmonica, percussion (2009-2013)
- Eddie Berljafa—bass (2009, 2011-2013)

Timeline

== Discography ==
- The Fall Risk, Volume No. 1
