= Keith & Donna =

Studio album by Keith and Donna Godchaux
- Released: March 1975
- Genre: Rock, rhythm and blues
- Label: Round
- Producer: Keith and Donna Godchaux

Keith & Donna is an album by Keith Godchaux and Donna Jean Godchaux. Their only studio album as a duo leading their own band, it was released in 1975 on the Round Records label. Produced as a vinyl LP, it has not been released on CD.

On Keith & Donna, both of the Godchauxs sing lead and backing vocals, and Keith plays various keyboard instruments. The album was recorded and released while they were members of the Grateful Dead, and Jerry Garcia plays guitar on all the songs. On most of the tracks, Denny Seiwell (from Wings) plays drums and Chris Stewart (from Spooky Tooth) plays bass.

== Recording ==
In an interview with Blair Jackson, Donna Godchaux said, "Almost all of it was recorded at our house in Stinson Beach. Bob Matthews brought in a Neve board and we had our nine-foot Steinway there and we had our whole living room set up as a recording studio for a while. Jerry was just a couple of minutes away, so it was real easy to get together and work on it."

In a 2014 interview with Rolling Stone, she said, "I have issues with it, like our version of 'River Deep, Mountain High', but I still remember the spirit of it. I could almost day by day tell you what happened with that. Here's Garcia and Keith and I living in Stinson Beach and we recorded it in our living room when Zion was asleep at four months old. It was so special. And I can't repeat it. Keith is gone and Jerry is gone. I don't care what the critics ever say about that record. I still love what we did together at that time."

== Track listing ==
Side one

1. "River Deep, Mountain High" (Phil Spector, Ellie Greenwich, Jeff Barry) – 4:17
2. "Sweet Baby" (Keith Godchaux, Donna Godchaux) – 5:01
3. "Woman Make You" (K. Godchaux, D. Godchaux) – 4:32
4. "When You Start to Move" (K. Godchaux, D. Godchaux) – 4:04

Side two

1. "Showboat" (K. Godchaux, D. Godchaux, Brian Godchaux) – 2:28
2. "My Love for You" (K. Godchaux, D. Godchaux) – 5:49
3. "Farewell Jack" (K. Godchaux, D. Godchaux, B. Godchaux) – 3:08
4. "Who Was John" (traditional) – 2:22
5. "Every Song I Sing" (K. Godchaux, D. Godchaux) – 6:26

== Personnel ==
Musicians

- Donna Godchaux – vocals
- Keith Godchaux – keyboards, vocals
- Jerry Garcia – guitar, vocals
- Denny Seiwell – drums
- Chrissy Stewart – bass

Additional musicians

- Brian Godchaux – violin on "Every Song I Sing"
- Merl Saunders – organ on "Sweet Baby"
- Bernard Purdie – drums on "River Deep, Mountain High"
- John Kahn – bass on "River Deep, Mountain High"
- Jim Brereton – drums on "Farewell Jack"
- Bill Wolf – bass on "Farewell Jack "

Production

- Keith and Donna Godchaux – producers
- Bill Wolf – engineer
- Fred Bradfield – assistant engineer
- Gene Eichelberger – mixing
- Merl Saunders – mixing
- Andy Leonard – front cover photograph
- Cadillac Ron – back cover photograph
- Jerry Garcia – illustration of Zion's thoughts
