= Donna Jean Godchaux Band =

American rock band (2007–2021)

- Origin: United States
- Genres: Rock, jam
- Years active: 2007–2021
- Past members: Donna Jean Godchaux-MacKay; Jeff Mattson; David MacKay; Joe Chirco; Freeman White; Mookie Siegel; Klyph Black; Tom Circosta; Dave Diamond; Wendy Lanter; Mark Adler
- Website: donnajeangodchauxband.com

The Donna Jean Godchaux Band was an American rock band that featured vocalist Donna Jean Godchaux.

The band formed in 2007 and comprised Donna Jean Godchaux, formerly of the Grateful Dead, and members of the Zen Tricksters. Originally named Kettle Joe's Psychedelic Swamp Revue, they soon changed their name to Donna Jean and the Tricksters. They released a self-titled album in 2008. In March 2009, the group changed their name to the Donna Jean Godchaux Band. In 2014, they released the album Back Around.

== Discography ==
- For Rex: The Black Tie Dye Ball – The Zen Tricksters featuring Donna Jean Godchaux-MacKay, et al. (2006)
- Donna Jean and the Tricksters – Donna Jean and the Tricksters (2008)
- Iridium Live 004 – Donna Jean Godchaux Band (2012)
- Back Around – Donna Jean Godchaux Band with Jeff Mattson (2014)
