= John Kadlecik =

American musician

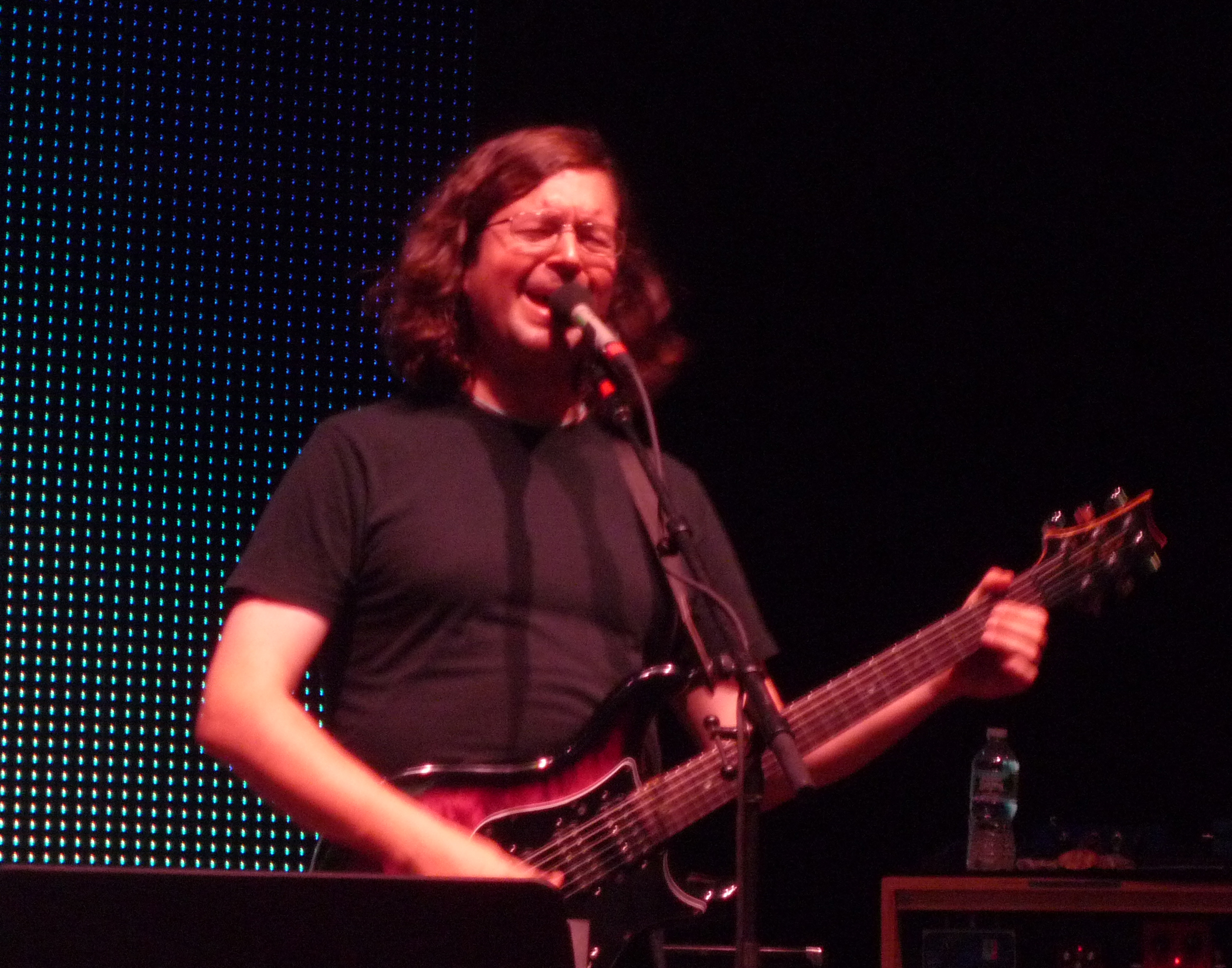
- Kadlecik performing with Furthur at Mann Center in Philadelphia July 23, 2011

Background information
- Born: June 28, 1969 (age 57); Council Bluffs, Iowa
- Genres: Rock, jam, psychedelic, folk, jazz, bluegrass
- Occupations: Musician, singer-songwriter
- Instruments: Guitar, violin, mandolin, vocals, percussion
- Years active: 1986–present
- Member of: JGB
- Formerly of: Dark Star Orchestra; Furthur; Phil Lesh and Friends
- Website: johnkmusic.net

John Kadlecik (born June 28, 1969, in Council Bluffs, Iowa) is an American guitarist. He was a founding member and the lead guitarist of the Grateful Dead tribute band Dark Star Orchestra from 1997 to 2009. He then performed with original Grateful Dead members Bob Weir and Phil Lesh in Furthur until their disbandment in 2014.

== Early life ==
John Kadlecik's mother is a visual artist and his father a city manager. Because of this, his family moved every few years in his early life. He lived in Omaha, Cincinnati and Davenport where he began studying classical violin before his family relocated to the Chicago area. In high school he became interested in improvisation and he began teaching himself guitar.

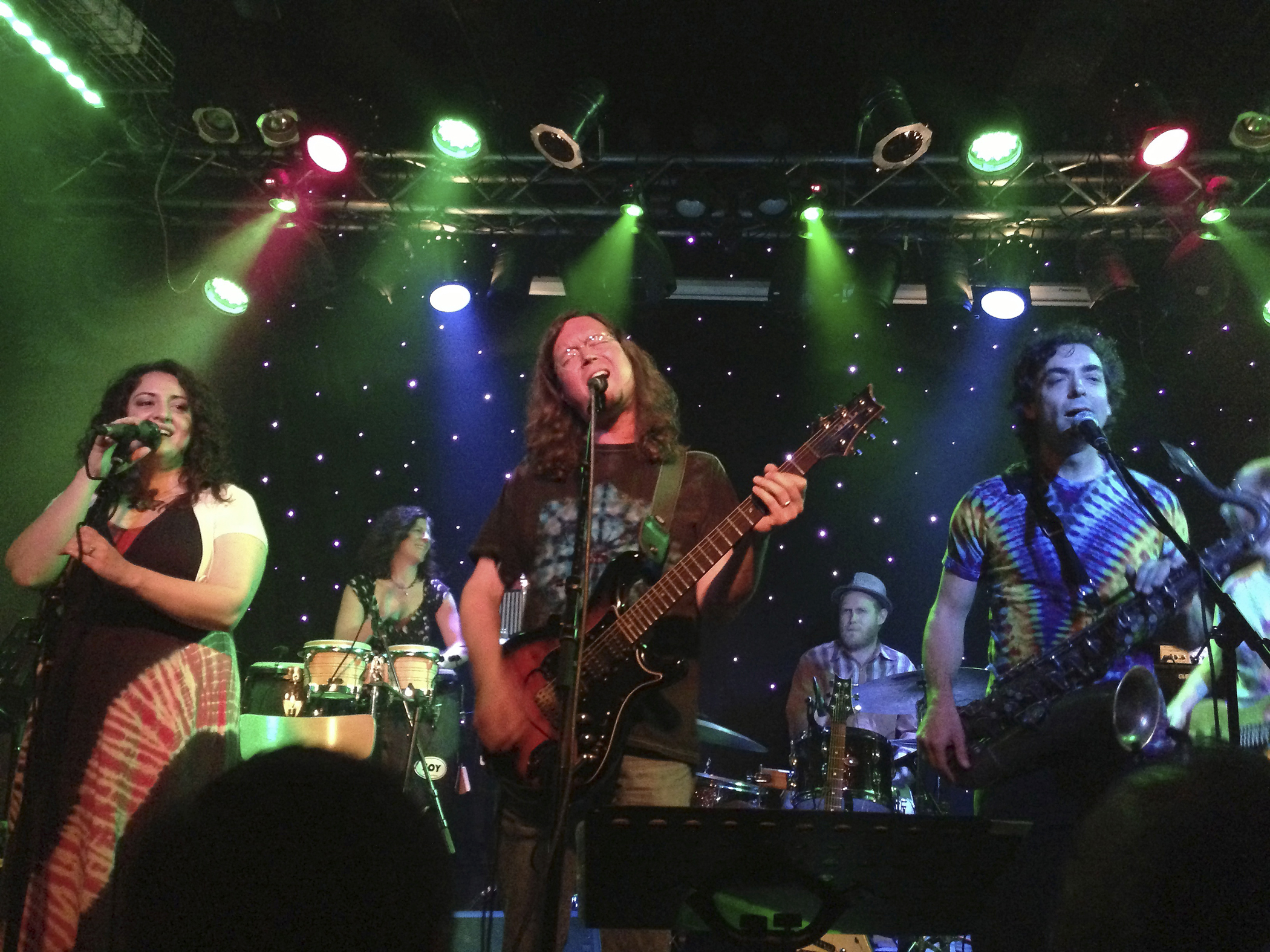
Kadlecik with the John K Band at Mexicali Live in Teaneck, NJ on April 13, 2013

== Musical career ==
Kadlecik played in several garage bands throughout high school before he became interested in jazz and folk music. In 1990 he began performing regularly with a Chicago area folk-rock band called Uncle Buffalo's Urban Mountain Review before joining Hairball Willie in 1991. With John on guitar, violin, and vocals, Hairball Willie performed around the Midwest and released several recordings, including a full-length studio CD, Just Defying Gravity. He then had a brief stint with a Grateful Dead tribute band called Uncle John's Band in 1996 before forming his own group called Wingnut.

In 1997, he co-founded the Dark Star Orchestra, which was originally intended to be a one night a week Dead cover band formed by deadhead musicians. Before long all the group members quit their other projects and began concentrating on the group full-time. Since then John has been noted for his abilities to emulate Jerry Garcia's playing and singing abilities. On several occasions former members of the Grateful Dead have joined Kadlecik and the Dark Star Orchestra on stage.

In 2003, Kadlecik began performing occasionally with Melvin Seals in several tributes to the music of the Jerry Garcia Band. This led ultimately to the formation of the Mix with Melvin Seals, Greg Anton, Jeff Pevar, and Kevin Rosen. The Mix signed a recording contract with Rainman Records and released a full-length CD, American Spring, which featured two of Greg Anton's songwriting collaborations with Robert Hunter sung by Kadlecik as well as two of John's Hairball Willie songs co-written with lyricist Eric Olson.

In August 2009, Kadlecik joined Grateful Dead members Bob Weir and Phil Lesh in their band Furthur. On November 16, 2009, John announced that he was officially leaving Dark Star Orchestra to concentrate his time on Furthur. His final performance with Dark Star Orchestra was on December 5, 2009, in Buffalo, New York.

In addition to his work with Dark Star Orchestra and Furthur, Kadlecik has continued to perform on his own in the Washington D.C. area, both solo acoustic and as the leader of small bands, including projects like Firewheel. On April 11, 2010, John debuted the John K Band in Washington, D.C., performing his original songs, written with lyricists Eric Olson and Indi Riverflow, as well as songs by the Grateful Dead, the Jerry Garcia Band, Phish, and others. He has also played with Oteil Burbridge's band Oteil and the Peacemakers.

After the final Dead performances, where Trey Anastasio was chosen to play lead guitar in favor of Kadlecik (Fare Thee Well), he was invited back to play a few shows with Phil Lesh & Friends at Terrapin Crossroads in San Rafael, CA.

As of early 2026, Kadlecik is the guitarist and a singer with Melvin Seals and JGB.

== Personal life ==
As of 2010, Kadlecik was living in Takoma Park, Maryland.
