= Zen Tricksters =

American rock band

- Origin: Long Island, New York
- Genres: Rock
- Years active: 1979–present
- Members: Jeff Mattson; Klyph Black; Tom Circosta; Dave Diamond
- Past members: Rob Barraco; Jennifer Markard; Joe Chirco; Pete Levin; Joe Ciarvella; Alan Lerner; Jeff Quay
- Website: www.zentricksters.com

The Zen Tricksters are an American Grateful Dead cover band. For over forty years, the Zen Tricksters have been playing Grateful Dead covers and jam band music, as well as derivative original songs. The band started out as the Volunteers, playing small venues around New York's Long Island. At its core, the band has been composed of Jeff Mattson on lead guitar and vocals, for most of its history, Tom Circosta on rhythm guitar and vocals, and Klyph Black on bass and vocals.

Over the years, the Zen Tricksters have gone through several lineup changes. Jennifer Markard was a founding member and original songwriter and vocalist in the band its first ten years of touring. Both Jeff Mattson and one of their former members, keyboard player Rob Barraco, was called to play with Phil and Friends for three shows in October 1999, and Rob continued to play with Phil Lesh and Friends, and with such groups as the Dark Star Orchestra, the Other Ones, and the Dead. Their current lineup, in addition to Mattson, Circosta, and Black, includes Dave Diamond on drums.

In 2006 they began touring with former Grateful Dead singer Donna Jean Godchaux MacKay as Kettle Joe's Psychedelic Swamp Revue, with Drummer Joe Ciarvella. In late 2006 the band changed drummers and formed Donna Jean and the Tricksters. In 2009 the band morphed into the Donna Jean Godchaux Band and it retained Jeff Mattson. The Zen Tricksters went on hiatus from touring but Klyph Black, Tom Circosta and Dave Diamond are touring with additional musicians as Klyph Black & Rumor Has It.

The Zen Tricksters maintain an active performance schedule, appearing in various lineups throughout the year.

== Music ==
Known to their fans as the Tricksters, the band generally plays a mixture of Grateful Dead and other covers, and their own derivative/ original songs.

== Venues ==
Playing relatively small venues around the North Shore of Long Island, such as Theodore's in Oyster Bay and New York Ave in Huntington. For many years, through most of the 1980s into the early 1990s, they were a Saturday night staple at the Right Track Inn in Freeport, Long Island, New York Every Saturday night. The band grew in popularity to become one of the leading Grateful Dead cover bands in the New York metro area. In time they found themselves playing New York City clubs such as the Wetlands, a club dedicated to the jam band genre. In the early 1990s the band increased the range of their touring to locations from Maine to North Carolina. Their popularity increased following the death of Jerry Garcia, when a broader audience saw the band and attended Dead themed festivals like the Gathering of the Vibes.

== Discography ==
- Holy Fool (1998)
- A Love Surreal (1999)
- Shaking Off the Weirdness (2003)
- For Rex: The Black Tie Dye Ball - The Zen Tricksters w/Donna Jean Godchaux, Mickey Hart, Tom Constanten, David Nelson, Michael Falzarano, Rob Barraco (2006)
- Donna Jean and the Tricksters (2008)
