= Donna Jean Godchaux =

American singer (1947–2025)

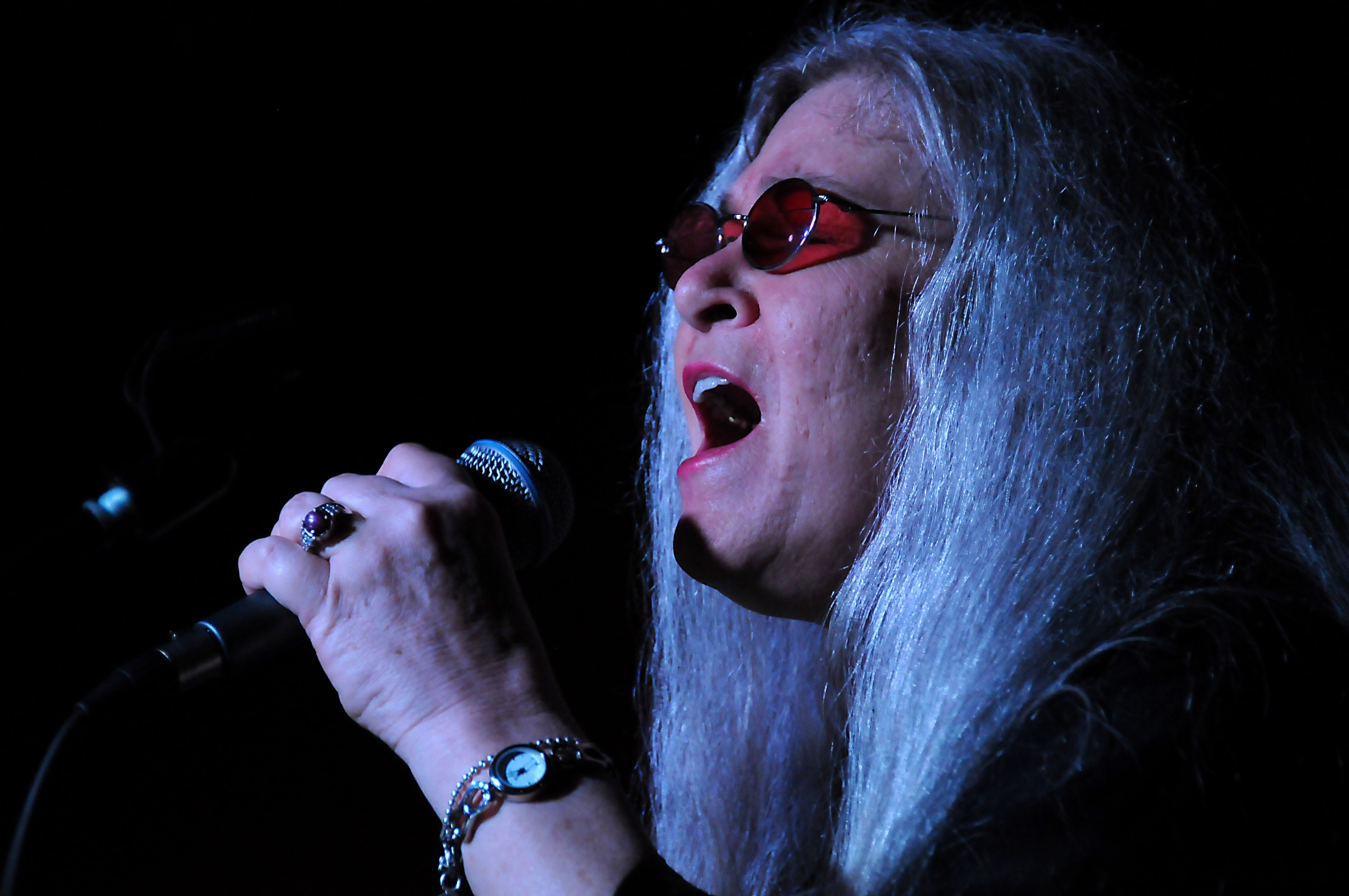
- Godchaux singing in 2009

Background information
- Born: Donna Jean Thatcher; August 22, 1947; Florence, Alabama, U.S.
- Died: November 2, 2025 (aged 78) Nashville, Tennessee, U.S.
- Genres: Rock; folk; psychedelia; gospel; rhythm and blues
- Occupations: Singer; songwriter
- Years active: 1966–2025
- Formerly of: Grateful Dead; Jerry Garcia Band; Donna Jean Godchaux Band; Heart of Gold Band
- Website: Official website

Donna Jean Thatcher Godchaux-MacKay (August 22, 1947 – November 2, 2025) was an American singer best known as a member of the rock band the Grateful Dead from 1972 to 1979. In addition to the Dead, she performed with the Jerry Garcia Band and the short-lived Heart of Gold Band, all alongside her first husband, Keith Godchaux. She formed the Donna Jean Godchaux Band in 2006.

== Life and career ==
Donna Jean Thatcher was born in Florence, Alabama, on August 22, 1947. Prior to 1970, she had worked as a session singer in Muscle Shoals, Alabama, eventually singing with a group called Southern Comfort and appearing as a backup singer on at least two number one hit songs: "When a Man Loves a Woman" by Percy Sledge in 1966 and "Suspicious Minds" by Elvis Presley in 1969. Her vocals were featured on other recordings by Boz Scaggs and Duane Allman, Cher, Joe Tex, Neil Diamond and many others. She then moved to California and met future fellow Grateful Dead member Keith Godchaux, whom she married in 1970.

Donna introduced Keith to Jerry Garcia after Garcia's performance at San Francisco's Keystone Korner in September 1971. At the time, Donna was not working as a musician. She joined the band shortly afterwards, remaining a member until February 1979.

Donna provided backing and lead vocals in the group's music. During their membership in the Grateful Dead, the couple also issued the mostly self-written Keith & Donna album in 1975 with Jerry Garcia as a Keith and Donna Band member and played several Bay Area gigs with Garcia sitting in. From January 26, 1976 thru November 3, 1978 Keith and Donna played 146 nights as members of the Jerry Garcia Band along with John Kahn and fellow Elvis-alumnus Ron Tutt.

Godchaux possessed a mezzo-soprano vocal range.

In a 2014 Rolling Stone interview, she described her departure from the band saying, "Keith and I, we were wasted. We were exhausted. And the band was exhausted with us. The band knew we had to be out of the band, and Keith and I had been talking about 'How in the world do you quit the Grateful Dead?' It was sad, but it was what needed to happen. It was turning into being not profitable for anybody. We needed to go, and they needed for us to go."

After the Grateful Dead, the couple started the Heart of Gold Band.

Donna did not perform again with any Grateful Dead band members until after the death of Jerry Garcia. Shortly after her husband's death in 1980, she married bassist David MacKay (former Fiddleworms member and bassist for the Donna Jean Godchaux Band) and the couple moved to her childhood town of Florence, Alabama, to record at the Muscle Shoals Sound Studio. The couple remained married until her death in November 2025 after a battle with cancer.

In 2006, Godchaux formed Kettle Joe's Psychadelic Swamp Revue, later known as Donna Jean & the Tricksters, with Jeff Mattson (of Phil Lesh and Friends, Zen Tricksters, and Dark Star Orchestra) and Mookie Siegel (of David Nelson Band, Phil Lesh and Friends, and Ratdog). They changed their name to the Donna Jean Godchaux Band in 2009. She occasionally made guest appearances with Bob Weir & RatDog, Zero & Steve Kimock, New Riders of the Purple Sage, Dark Star Orchestra and Dead & Company. She also continued to be involved in archival Grateful Dead projects.

Godchaux was inducted into the Rock and Roll Hall of Fame as a member of the Grateful Dead in 1994, and was inducted into the Alabama Music Hall of Fame in 2016.

Godchaux died from cancer at a Nashville hospice, on November 2, 2025, at the age of 78.

== Personal life ==
Godchaux married keyboardist Keith Godchaux in 1970, the year before they joined the Grateful Dead.

In 1981, Donna Godchaux married bass player David Mackay, but professionally remained Donna Jean Godchaux until her death.

Godchaux had one son from each of her two marriages. Her older son, Zion Godchaux, was born in 1974. Her younger son, Kinsman MacKay, is also a musician. Zion and Kinsman are in a band called BoomBox.

At the time of her death, she was survived by her husband, David MacKay; her son Kinsman MacKay, and his wife, Molly; her son Zion Godchaux and his son, Delta; her sister, Gogi Clark; and her brother, Ivan Thatcher.

== Discography ==
=== As group leader or co-leader ===
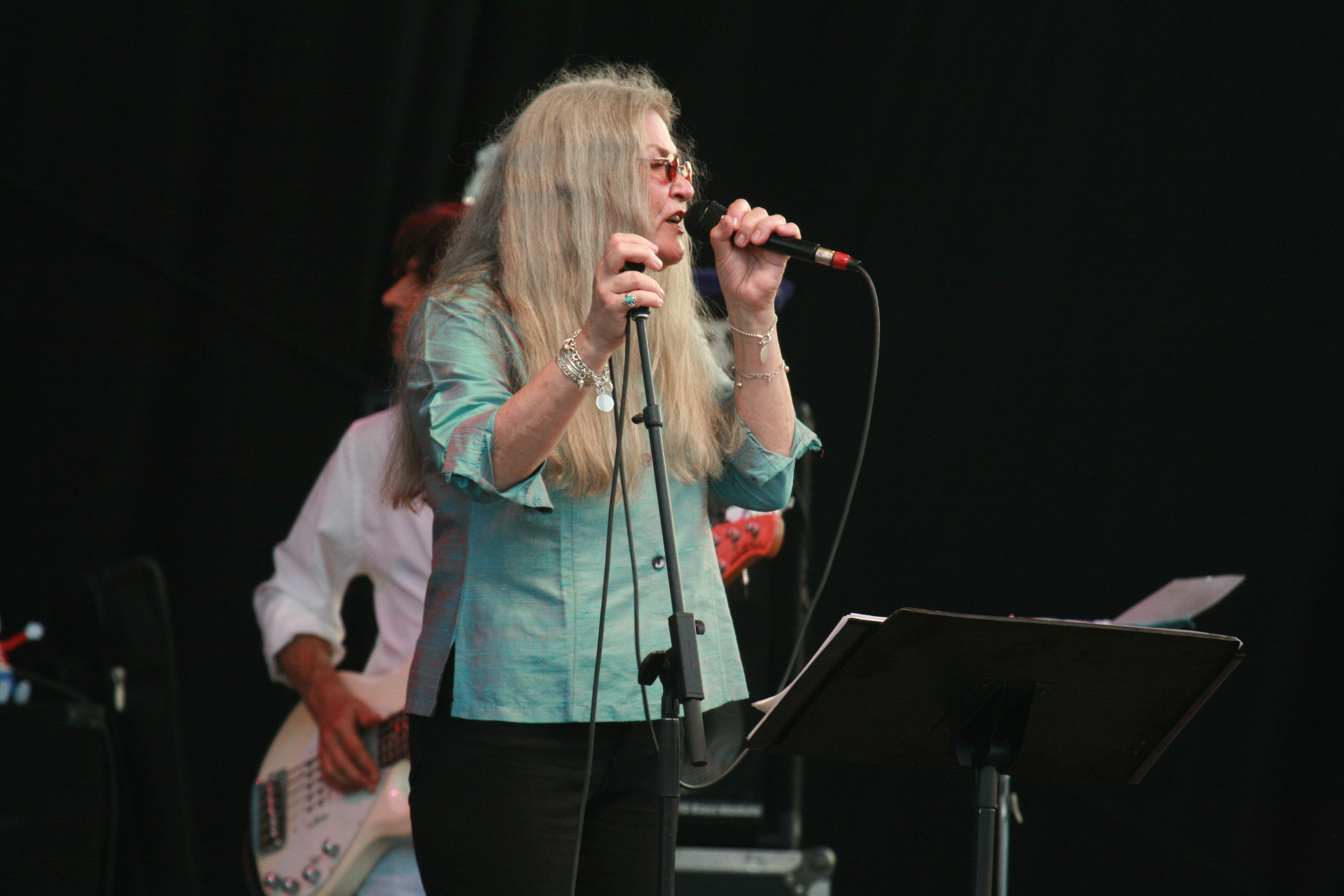
Godchaux in 2008

- Keith & Donna – Keith and Donna Godchaux – 1975
- Playing in the Heart of Gold Band – The Ghosts – 1984
- The Heart of Gold Band – The Heart of Gold Band – 1986
- Donna Jean – The Donna Jean Band – 1998
- At the Table – The Heart of Gold Band – 2004
- Donna Jean and the Tricksters – Donna Jean and the Tricksters – 2008
- Iridium Live 004 – Donna Jean Godchaux Band – 2012
- Back Around – Donna Jean Godchaux Band with Jeff Mattson – 2014
- "Shelter" (single remix) – Donna Jean and the Tricksters – 2021

=== With the Grateful Dead ===
Godchaux was a member of the Grateful Dead from March 1972 to February 1979. In addition to the albums listed here, released during her tenure with the group, she also appears on numerous live recordings of shows released after she left the band.

- Europe '72 – 1972
- Wake of the Flood – 1973
- From the Mars Hotel – 1974
- Blues for Allah – 1975
- Terrapin Station – 1977
- Shakedown Street – 1978

=== With other artists ===
Godchaux contributed background or lead vocals as both a session and feature vocalist on many recordings by different artists.

Singles

- "When a Man Loves a Woman" / "Love Me Like You Mean It" – Percy Sledge – 1966
- "Suspicious Minds" / "You'll Think of Me" – Elvis Presley – 1969

Videos

- Muscle Shoals – various artists – 2013
- Move Me Brightly – various artists – 2013

Albums

- From Elvis in Memphis – Elvis Presley – 1969
- From Memphis to Vegas/From Vegas to Memphis – Elvis Presley – 1969
- 3614 Jackson Highway – Cher – 1969
- Boz Scaggs – Boz Scaggs – 1969
- Ton-Ton Macoute! – Johnny Jenkins – 1970
- Ace – Bob Weir – 1972
- Demon in Disguise – David Bromberg – 1972
- Gypsy Cowboy – New Riders of the Purple Sage – 1972
- The Adventures of Panama Red – New Riders of the Purple Sage – 1973
- Tales of the Great Rum Runners – Robert Hunter – 1974
- Tiger Rose – Robert Hunter – 1975
- Reflections – Jerry Garcia – 1976
- Cats Under the Stars – Jerry Garcia Band – 1977
- Here Goes Nothing – Zero – 1987
- Laughing Water – Jazz Is Dead – 1999
- Don't Let Go – Jerry Garcia Band – 2001
- Worcester, MA, 4/4/73 – New Riders of the Purple Sage – 2003
- Pure Jerry: Theatre 1839, San Francisco, July 29 & 30, 1977 – Jerry Garcia Band – 2004
- Pure Jerry: Warner Theatre, March 18, 1978 – Jerry Garcia Band – 2005
- For Rex: The Black Tie Dye Ball – The Zen Tricksters and various artists – 2006
- Pure Jerry: Bay Area 1978 – Jerry Garcia Band – 2009
- Garcia Live Volume Four – Jerry Garcia Band – 2014
- Garcia Live Volume Seven – Jerry Garcia Band – 2016
- Garcia Live Volume 17 – Jerry Garcia Band – 2021
- Garcia Live Volume 21 – Jerry Garcia Band – 2024

== See also ==
- FAME Studios
- Muscle Shoals Sound Studios
- Muscle Shoals, Alabama
