= Jeff Chimenti =

American keyboardist

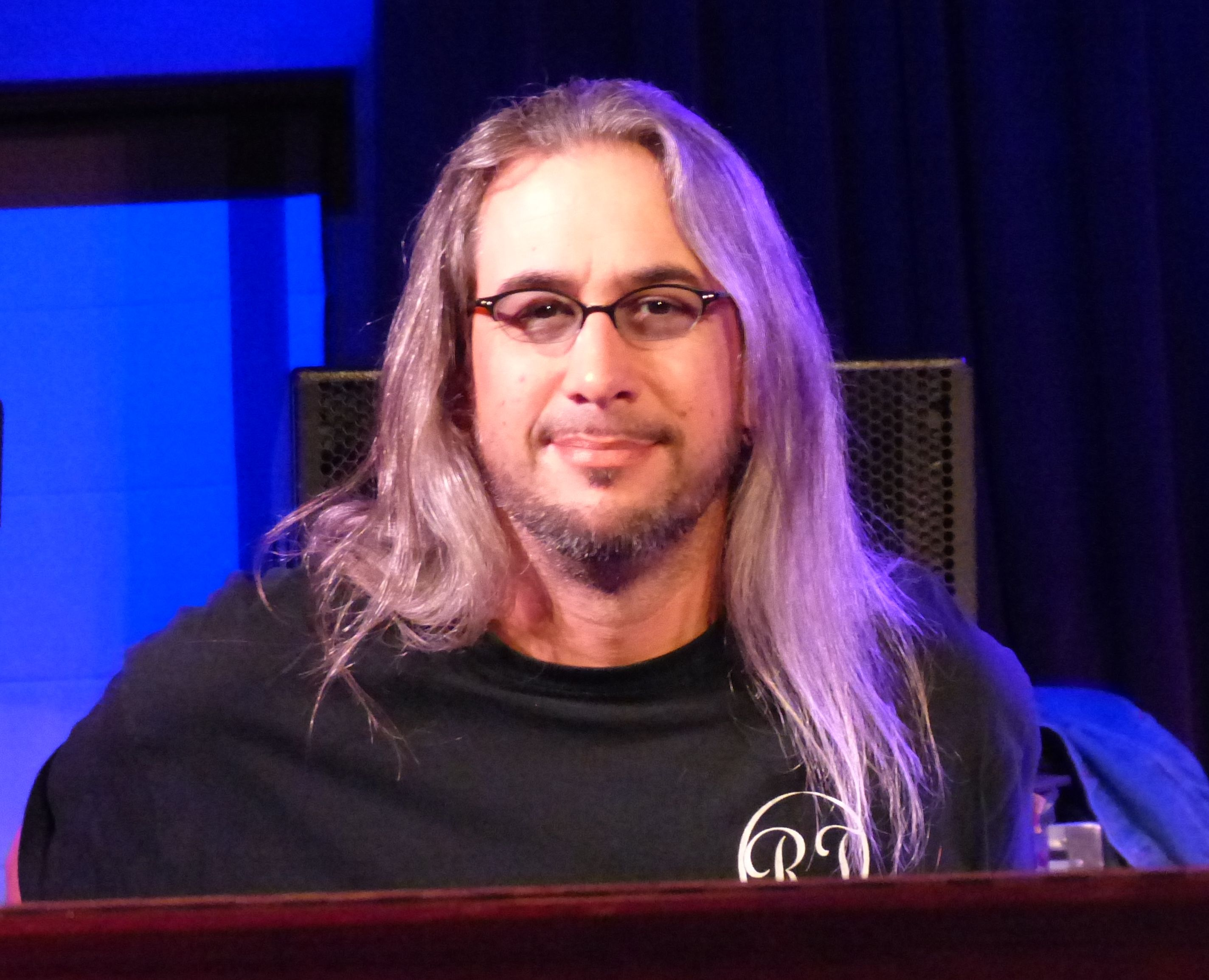
- Jeff Chimenti performing with Phil Lesh & Friends at Terrapin Crossroads, Dec. 6th 2013

Background information
- Born: Jeffrey Chimenti; October 21, 1968 (age 57); San Francisco, California
- Genres: Rock, jazz, jam, psychedelia
- Occupation: Musician
- Instruments: Keyboards, vocals
- Years active: 1980s–present
- Label: Columbia Records
- Member of: Dead & Company; Wolf Bros
- Formerly of: RatDog; Les Claypool's Frog Brigade; The Other Ones; The Dead; Furthur; Golden Gate Wingmen
- Website: jeffchimenti.com

Signature
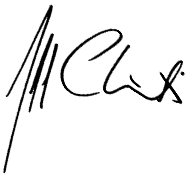

Jeff Chimenti (born October 21, 1968) is an American keyboardist, best known for his ongoing work with former members of the Grateful Dead. Since May 1997 he has played with Bob Weir & RatDog, and has also played on every tour of The Dead (including the Fare Thee Well lineup) and Furthur. He currently plays with Dead & Company.

== Early life and music career ==
A native of the San Francisco Bay Area, Chimenti began playing piano when he was four and he studied formally from the age of seven to around the time he finished high school. Once he graduated from high school, he began playing in bands around the Bay area. He played in local jazz bands as well as Les Claypool's Frog Brigade. He has also played back-up for pop acts such as En Vogue.

He was playing in Dave Ellis's jazz quartet when Ellis was hired to play saxophone in Bob Weir & RatDog. Ellis informed him that RatDog was also looking for a new keyboardist. Chimenti was hired and played his first show 28 May 1997. Chimenti has been a member of RatDog ever since and has occasionally performed with Phil Lesh and Friends. While performing, he commonly uses Brent Mydland's Hammond B3 organ.

He performed with The Other Ones during the band's final tour with that name in 2002. This was the first time that Bob Weir, Phil Lesh, Bill Kreutzmann and Mickey Hart all performed together since the disbandment of the Grateful Dead in 1995.

He continued to perform with every version of the Dead that toured in 2003, 2004 and 2009. Following The Dead's final tour in 2009 he joined Bob Weir and Phil Lesh in their project Furthur. Furthur toured consistently between 2009 and 2014.

During early 2015 Chimenti joined musicians John Kadlecik, Reed Mathis and Jay Lane in the band the Golden Gate Wingmen.

Chimenti performed at the five 50th anniversary performances of the Grateful Dead in Santa Clara, at Levi's Stadium, on June 27 and 28 2015 and in Chicago, at Soldier Field, on July 3, 4 and 5 2015.

Following the success of the Fare Thee Well shows, he toured with the band Dead & Company through 2023, with former Grateful Dead members Bob Weir, Bill Kreutzmann, and Mickey Hart, along with John Mayer and former Allman Brothers bassist Oteil Burbridge. In 2024, it was announced that Dead & Company would do a residency at the Sphere in Las Vegas.

Chimenti has played with one or more former Grateful Dead members for over 25 years (he joined Ratdog in May 1997), which by comparison is as long as the tenure of the last three Grateful Dead keyboardists combined (Keith Godchaux, Brent Mydland and Vince Welnick, 1971–1995).

== Outside of music ==
Chimenti and a roadie developed a product used to prevent facial abrasions from the use of CPAP machines.

In 2017 Chimenti served as Music Supervisor on "Red Roses, Green Gold" an Off-Broadway musical featuring the music of Robert Hunter and Jerry Garcia, with additional music by Phil Lesh, Bob Weir and Mickey Hart, and Hunter's longtime collaborator, Greg Anton. The production was directed and choreographed by Rachel Klein, featured a book by Michael Norman Mann, and performed at the Minetta Lane Theatre in New York City.

== Discography ==
Jeff Chimenti has contributed to albums by a number of different musical artists.

- Evening Moods – RatDog – 2000
- Live Frogs Set 1 – Colonel Les Claypool's Fearless Flying Frog Brigade – 2001
- Live at Roseland – RatDog – 2001
- Live Frogs Set 2 – Colonel Les Claypool's Fearless Flying Frog Brigade – 2001
- Move Me Brightly – various artists – 2013
- TRI – Sessions vol. 1 – Fog – 2013
- Fare Thee Well: Celebrating 50 Years of the Grateful Dead – The Dead – 2015
- TRI – Sessions vol. 2 – Fog – 2019
- Live in Colorado – Bobby Weir & Wolf Bros – 2022
- Live in Colorado Vol. 2 – Bobby Weir & Wolf Bros – 2022
