= Jemimah Puddleduck (album) =

Live album by Jemimah Puddleduck
- Released: 2000
- Recorded: 1999 – 2000
- Genre: Rock
- Length: 76:10
- Label: Quacktone
- Producer: Mark Karan

Jemimah Puddleduck is an album by the rock group of the same name. It was recorded live at several different concerts in 1999 and 2000, and released in 2000.

The band Jemimah Puddleduck is based in the San Francisco Bay Area, and led by guitarist and singer Mark Karan, who is also a member of Bob Weir's band RatDog. At the time their self-titled first album was recorded, Jemimah Puddleduck also featured John Molo (who had previously played with Bruce Hornsby, The Other Ones, and Phil Lesh and Friends) on drums, Bob Gross (Albert King, Delaney Bramlett) on bass, and Arlan Schierbaum (Richie Kotzen) on keyboards.

== Track listing ==
1. "Don't Look Back" (Robinson, White) – 7/17/99, Ventura Theater, Ventura CA
2. "U Can Stay but th' Noize Mus' Go" (Watson) – 7/17/99, Ventura Theater, Ventura CA
3. "Rock Your Papa" (Karan) — 1/19/00, Humptie's, Tahoe City CA
4. "Memphis Radio" (Sheller) – 1/19/00, Humptie's, Tahoe City CA
5. "Time Will Tell" (Karan) – 7/17/99, Ventura Theater, Ventura CA
6. "My Car is So Groovy" (Schierbaum) – 3/3/00, Ventura Theater, Ventura CA
7. "Bait the Hook" (Karan) – 1/19/00, Humptie's, Tahoe City CA
8. "She" (Parsons) – 1/19/00, Humptie's, Tahoe City CA
9. "Annie Don't Lie" (Call) – 3/3/00, Ventura Theater, Ventura CA

== Credits ==
=== Musicians ===
- Mark Karan – guitar, lead vocals
- John Molo – drums, percussion
- Bob Gross – bass, backing vocals
- Arlan Schierbaum – Wurlitzer, B-3, lead vocal on "My Car is So Groovy"

=== Production ===
- Produced by Mark Karan
- Engineered by Arlan Schierbaum and Blake Beman
- Mastered by Technovoice, Studio City CA
- Artwork by Mikio Kennedy
- Photography by Alan Hess
- Design and layout by Mark Karan and Alan Hess

=== Stage and Road Crew ===
- "Big Jake" Loveridge
- "Larry the Duck" Loveridge
