= Heart of Gold =

Heart of Gold may refer to:

== Film and television ==
- A Heart of Gold, a 1915 American silent romantic drama short film
- Heart of Gold (1923 film), a Spanish silent film directed by Manuel Noriega
- Heart of Gold (1941 film), a Spanish comedy directed by Ignacio F. Iquino
- Neil Young: Heart of Gold, a 2006 documentary and concert film by Jonathan Demme
- Hearts of Gold, a BBC television series presented by Esther Rantzen

Television episodes

- "Heart of Gold" (Firefly)
- "Heart of Gold" (Instant Star)
- "Heart of Gold" (Mysticons)
- "Heart of Gold" (Once Upon a Time)

== Literature ==
- Heart of Gold (novel), a 2000 novel by Sharon Shinn
- Heart of Gold, a 1975 novel by Russell H. Greenan
- Heart of Gold, a 2007 novel by Michael Pryor

== Music ==
- Heart of Gold (album), a 1988 album by Sofia Rotaru
- "Heart of Gold" (Neil Young song), 1972
- "Heart of Gold" (The Kinks song), 1983
- "Heart of Gold" (Johnny Hates Jazz song), 1987
- "Heart of Gold" (Force & Styles song), 1998
- "Heart of Gold" (BQL song), 2017
- "Heart of Gold" (Shawn Mendes song), 2024
- "Heart of Gold", a song by Ashlyne Huff
- "Heart of Gold", a song by James Blunt from Some Kind of Trouble
- Heart of Gold Band, a band formed by former Grateful Dead members Keith and Donna Jean Godchaux
- Heart of Gold Records, an American record label

== Other uses ==
- Heart of Gold, a fictional spaceship in The Hitchhiker's Guide to the Galaxy franchise
- Heart of Gold, a proposed name for a cargo flight in the SpaceX Mars transportation infrastructure

== See also ==
- Hooker with a heart of gold, a literary archetype
- Pokémon HeartGold, a 2009 role-playing video game
