= BoomBox (American band) =

American band

- Origin: Muscle Shoals, Alabama, United States
- Genres: Various: rock 'n' roll, blues, psychedelic, house, funk
- Years active: 2004–present
- Label: Heart of Gold Records
- Members: Zion Godchaux; Kinsman MacKay
- Past members: Russ Randolph; DJ Harry
- Website: thisisboombox.com

BoomBox is an American rock and electronic duo formed in 2004 by singer-songwriter Zion Godchaux and producer Russ Randolph, both of whom have backgrounds as DJs. The current duo consists of Godchaux and his brother, Kinsman McKay.

Originating in Muscle Shoals, Alabama, BoomBox has released numerous studio albums, starting in 2005 with Visions of Backbeat. Their second album, Downriverelectric, was released in June 2010, followed by Filling in the Color (2014) and Bits & Pieces (2016). Their newest album, Western Voodoo, was released on October 19, 2018. Their newest single released in June 2017 is titled "Right Around Two (Feat. Donna Jean)".

They tour frequently, and have appeared at festivals such as Wakarusa and the Hangout Music Festival. The band is known for not using setlists, instead improvising and changing their set's direction based on the crowd's energy. According to NUVO, "BoomBox plays a unique blend of psychedelic rock and electronica," and also incorporates elements of funk, soul, R&B, and house.

On November 17, 2016, BoomBox announced via their Facebook page that Russ Randolph would be leaving the group to pursue a solo DJ project. Randolph’s last show was in Denver, Colorado, at The Gothic Theatre on December 31, 2016.

== History ==
=== Member background ===
BoomBox was formed in 2004 by singer-songwriter Zion Godchaux on guitar/lead vocals and producer Russ Randolph on sequencers, groove boxes and turn-tables. Both members, who first met in 2004, had long careers as music producers, musicians and DJs.

Russ Randolph had been raised in Muscle Shoals, Alabama, and picked up drums at an early age. Muscle Shoals is known for its music scene, and early on Randolph was exposed to R&B, including artists such as Wilson Pickett, Otis Redding, and Aretha Franklin. After graduating from the University of North Alabama's School of Commercial Music, Randolph went on to work as a drummer, an engineer, a music producer, and a DJ.

Zion Godchaux was born and raised in San Francisco. He started playing drums at age two and owned his first drum set at age four, and around age 7 was drumming on stage with his mother, soul vocalist Donna Jean Godchaux. Godchaux listened avidly to rock and roll in his childhood, and as a teen he picked up guitar and began writing his own songs. Among his cited musical influences are reggae, jazz, and rap groups like A Tribe Called Quest and De La Soul. He also cites rock and soul influences like Jimi Hendrix, Bob Dylan, and The Grateful Dead. He has stated that both his parents, Keith and Donna Jean of the Grateful Dead and the 1980s Heart of Gold Band, were strong influences as well.

After serving as the rhythm guitarist in his mother's band for several years, Godchaux went on to become a vocalist, songwriter, guitarist, and music producer. During the 1990s he toured as a DJ in the San Francisco area. Both Randolph and Godchaux state that house music was an early influence on their musical taste; while Godchaux was exposed to house in San Francisco, Randolph listened to the genre while growing up in Muscle Shoals, Alabama, stating "I grew up influenced by that early house stuff. That heavy, full on the floor, hypnotic, minimal just tracks that made you groove."

=== Founding ===
In 2004 Zion Godchaux and Russ Randolph met while recording the Heart of Gold Band album At The Table. The Heart of Gold Band was a group started by Godchaux's parents after their time with the Grateful Dead.

Randolph had been hired by Godchaux's parents to help them upgrade their Muscle Shoals studio, as well as engineer and record the album. Godchaux was living in San Francisco in 2004, but he traveled to Muscle Shoals to help with the recording process.

Randolph and Godchaux collaborated on the title track to provide drum programming. According to Randolph, they "understood almost immediately" that they worked well together, and "One hundred doors opened at the same time." States Godchaux, "we both thought the same way about rhythm and about ways that we could layer stuff, ways that we could create songs." The recording process for At The Table took around six months, with the duo often working on music together in their free time. After a trip to Burning Man, where Godchaux pitched to Randolph the idea of working with electronic music again, they formulated the idea for the band.

Godchaux moved more permanently to Muscle Shoals, which the band now considers their town of origin, despite Godchaux's California background. Muscle Shoals is a historical hot spot for recording studios and musicians in rock and roll and rhythm and blues, and BoomBox has incorporated some of this history into their sound, allowing for a contemporary style and coupling of rock 'n' roll, vintage psychedelic and house.

Early on BoomBox toured with the Heart of Gold Band, and by their third or fourth gig were opening for Dark Star Orchestra, which they continued to do for some time. They also toured with jam band Particle.

=== Releases ===
On December 2, 2005, BoomBox released their debut album Visions of BackBeat on the Heart of Gold label. According to Examiner.com, "Their debut album is a heady brew of psychedelic, beat-infused, funky house music that is nearly impossible not to dance to."

Their second album, Downriverelectric, was released on June 30, 2010, also on Heart of Gold. Unlike their previous album, where tracks were largely layered via drum machines, their sophomore album had a more organic recording process. According to Randolph, "With the new record we started from scratch. We went back into the studio, analog tape, set up a drum set, mic’ed it, very old school, minimal miking, like Ringo Starr Beatles old-school miking. Then we set up a real bass rig, real keys, real guitar amps...I think this the closest thing we’ve done that’s sounds like what we have in our heads."

The album was given away for free to the first 1,000 fans who visited the band's website. As with their debut, the band toured heavily in support of the album, performing at venues such as the 2010 Mile High Music Festival. By February 2012 the band was using a Mercedes-Benz Sprinter as a tour van, with only Todd Jones, who handles their visuals and projections, and their tour manager Heath Bennett, and Keith Stevenson traveling with them.

Mastering for their third album was finished in September 2013, with most of the tracks recorded at Randolph's house. Filling in the Color officially released on January 14, 2014, on House of Gold Records. Stated Godchaux, “We have been splicing live instrumentation with produced material to create what we view as ‘studio quality with a live sound.'” Funding for the album came from a Kickstarter campaign, and within a week of the album's release the band was already touring in support.

=== Live performances ===
Since their first tours the band hasn't used set lists, instead changing their set's direction based on the crowd's energy. According to the band in 2008, "we want to build an arsenal so that when we come out to rock a party, at anytime of the day, we can still connect with people." The band typically performs with Randolph in a top hat, and Godchaux with a pink boa and furry hat. Though only the two founding members remain constant, at live performances the band does occasionally have guest musicians join them on sets.

The band toured heavily during the summer of 2007, including a June gig at the Wakarusa Music & Camping Festival in Lawrence, Kansas. In November of that year they debuted at Kalamazoo. Their first time performing as BoomBox outside of the United States was in New Zealand in 2012. As of January 2013 they were touring Colorado, performing a number of dates in Denver. For most of their 2013 US summer tour they were supported by European house DJ Ramona.

As of 2014 the band has played notable concerts and venues such as the Oregon Country Fair, The Echo Project, Rothbury Music Festival, Electric Forest, Summer Camp Music Festival, Mile High Music Festival, Hoxeyville Music Festival, Camp Bisco, IMPULSE Music & Arts Festival, French Broad River Festival, Bele Chere, The Bounce Festival, Hangout Music Festival, and the Wanee Music Festival in Florida. They performed at the February 2014 Tucson Gem and Jam Festival after starting a winter tour a few weeks earlier in Frisco, and in May 2014 they performed at the Euphoria Music and Camping Festival at Carsons Creek Ranch in Texas.

== Style, equipment ==
According to NUVO, "BoomBox plays a unique blend of psychedelic rock and electronica; think of a guitar-centric, slightly-relaxed Garganta or a less-spacey, more-groovy Papadosio."

"I have trouble putting what we do musically into words. It’s dance music, but it’s rock & roll. Actually it’s just funky. It’s soul music. I end up just throwing a bunch of names around and never really dialing it in."
—Godchaux in 2014

Early in their career a number of reviewers dubbed their sound "jamtronic" for its blend of jam and electronic music, but the band rejected the label for being inaccurate. According to Godchaux, "Jamtronic, to me, is jam bands trying to sound like a DJ. We think of ourselves as just one DJ. Bands already have their songs, they have their sets. A DJ is trying to make the party happen."

For songwriting inspiration, in 2011 the members pointed to old albums, with Randolph stating they listen to "really, really old stuff. Bob Marley demos. Jimi Hendrix demos from a hotel room with just a small recorder going. We listen to Townes Van Zandt and other singer-songwriters." About their sound in 2012, Randolph stated, "We think of ourselves as a rock band, first and foremost, that happens to use electronic devices to create our music." Also, states Godchaux, "We’re real rooted in house. But at the same time house falls into a sub-category of our rock ‘n’ roll approach." They've mentioned both Chicago house and San Francisco house as influences, with producers such as Johnny Fiasco and Miguel Migs.

Instrumentation

As of 2008, the band used two drum machines when mixing live, which Randolph would use to blend tracks together much as a DJ uses vinyl turntables. According to Randolph, "I'm kind of weaving the song into a kind of fabric. We're not locked in the way a DJ would be. We're not locked into song structure, a song arrangement or tempo and anything like that. We're pretty free to explore live." As of 2011, when mixing live Randolph uses Ableton Live or Logic Pro. On top of that, Godchaux adds live instrumentation with guitar and vocals, often improvising.

== Members ==
Current

- Zion Godchaux - guitar/lead vocals
- Kinsman MacKay (brother) - Machines

Past

- Russ Randolph - sequencers, groove boxes, turn-tables (parted ways with the band on 12/31/16)

== Discography ==
=== Solo albums ===
List of studio and live albums by BoomBox
Year	Album title	Release details
2005	Visions of Backbeat	Released: Dec 2, 2005; Label: Heart of Gold Records; Format: Digital, vinyl, CD
2010	Downriverelectric	Released: June 30, 2010; Label: Heart of Gold Records; Format: Digital
2014	Filling in the Color	Released: Jan 14, 2014; Label: Heart of Gold Records; Format: Digital, vinyl, CD
2016	Bits & Pieces	Released: Jan 15, 2016; Label: Heart of Gold Records; Format: Digital, vinyl
2018	Western Voodoo	Released: Oct 19, 2018; Label: Heart of Gold Records; Format: Digital, vinyl

=== Singles ===
Incomplete list of songs by BoomBox
Year	Title	Album	Notes
2010	"Dungeons"	downriverelectric	
2010	"Round And Round"	downriverelectric	
2010	"downriverelelectric"	downriverelectric	
2011	"Me And My Baby"	Single only	
2013	"Lost Ya"	Single only	
2013	"Waiting Around"	Filling in the Color promo single	
