= Walk Through Fire =

Walk Through Fire may refer to:

- Walk Through Fire (Raven album), 2009
- Walk Through Fire (Yola album), 2019
- "Walk Through Fire", a song by Bad Company from the 1990 album Holy Water
- "Walk Through Fire", a song by Olivia Newton-John from the 1988 album The Rumour

== See also ==
- Walk Through the Fire (album), a 2009 album by Mark Karan
- "Walk Through the Fire (song)", a 1984 single by Peter Gabriel
- '"Walk Through the Fire", a 2001 song from the Buffy the Vampire Slayer episode "Once More, with Feeling"
