= Runaway Gin =

American tribute band

- Also known as: Runaway Gin: A Tribute to Phish
- Origin: South Carolina, United States
- Genres: Rock; Psychedelic rock Alternative rock Jam band
- Years active: 2014 - present
- Members: Andy Greenberg; Jennifer Reiser; Curtis Wingfield; David "DKat" Katilius
- Past members: John "Fitz" Fitzgerald; Bobby Hogg; John Pope; Tim Khayat; Sean Bing; Karl Anderson
- Website: Official website

Runaway Gin: A Tribute to Phish is a South Carolina–based tribute band dedicated to playing the music of Phish. The group's name comes from a combination of two popular Phish songs, "Runaway Jim" and "Bathtub Gin".

The band formed in 2014 in Charleston, South Carolina, and consisted of founding members; Andy Greenberg (guitar), John "Ftiz" Fitzgerald (keys), Bobby Hogg (bass), and John Pope (drums). After Fitzgerald passed away in 2020, the band had multiple membership changes in the following years. All living bandmates, past and present, reunited for a 10 year anniversary concert in Charleston in January of 2024.

The group's big break came on July 4, 2015, after playing to a sold-out crowd at the Hard Rock Cafe in Chicago, Illinois, following the Grateful Dead's 50th Anniversary Concert across town that same day. After that performance the band began touring nationally on an annual basis, in addition to playing at musical festivals across the country. They have performed at many iconic venues, including the NorVA, The National, Jannus Live, the Georgia Theatre, the Highline Ballroom, and the Brooklyn Bowl. In 2024, they were the closing act at the Flood City Music Festival in Johnstown, Pennsylvania.

As of 2026, the band has performed in over 550 concerts across the country and have been voted 2022 Charleston Jam Band of the Year, as well as the Best Phish Tribute in the World two years in a row. On January 21, 2026, they released their first live album, MKT Price, Vol. 1, recorded on October 24, 2025, at the Charleston Pour House in Charleston, South Carolina.

== Current members ==
- Andy Greenberg – guitar, vocals (2014–present)
- Jennifer Reiser – keys, vocals (2020–present)
- Curtis Wingfield – drums, vocals (2022–present)
- David "DKat" Katilius – bass, vocals (2023–present)

== Past members ==
- John "Fitz" Fitzgerald – keys, vocals (2014–2020)
- Bobby Hogg – bass, vocals (2014–2021, 2023)
- John Pope – drums, vocals (2014–2021, 2023)
- Tim Khayat – bass, vocals (2021–2023)
- Sean Bing – drums, vocals (2021–2022, 2023)
- Karl Anderson – drums, vocals (2016, 2022–2023)

== Discography ==
Live albums

- MKT Price, Vol. 1 (2026, self-released)
