= Trios (Rob Wasserman album) =

Studio album by Rob Wasserman
- Released: February 1994
- Length: 56:50
- Label: MCA-GRP
- Producers: Rob Wasserman; John Cutler

Rob Wasserman chronology
Duos (1988)	Trios (1994)	Live (1998)

Trios is a studio album by American bassist Rob Wasserman. It was released in February 1994 through MCA-GRP Records. As the title implies, the album consists of trio pieces performed with guest musicians alongside solo bass pieces.

== Reception ==
In a review for AllMusic, Richard Meyer called the Elvis Costello and Marc Ribot collaboration "great", while choosing "Fantasy Is Reality" (performed by Brian and Carnie Wilson) as the album's best track. Music Connection also found "Fantasy Is Reality" to be a highlight, though the publication also found many of the other collaborations to be "less-than-stellar" and the bass instrumentals to be "unnecessary".

== Track listing ==
Trios track listing
No.	Title	Writer(s)	Length
1.	"Fantasy Is Reality/Bells of Madness" (with Brian Wilson and Carnie Wilson)	Sam Phillips; Rob Wasserman; B. Wilson	4:09
2.	"Put Your Big Toe in the Milk of Human Kindness" (with Elvis Costello and Marc Ribot)	Declan MacManus	4:08
3.	"White-Wheeled Limousine" (with Bruce Hornsby and Branford Marsalis)	Hornsby	4:57
4.	"Country (Bass Trilogy: Part 1)"	Wasserman	2:46
5.	"Zillionaire" (with Edie Brickell and Jerry Garcia)	Brickell; Garcia; Wasserman	5:12
6.	"Dustin' Off the Bass" (with Willie Dixon and Al Duncan)	Dixon	6:11
7.	"Easy Answers" (with Bob Weir and Neil Young)	Robert Hunter; Bob Bralove; Weir; Vince Welnick; Wasserman	5:59
8.	"Satisfaction (Bass Trilogy: Part 2)"	Jagger–Richards	2:21
9.	"Home Is Where You Get Across" (with Chris Whitley and Les Claypool)	Whitley	5:29
10.	"Spike's Bulls (Bass Trilogy: Part 3)"	Wasserman	3:11
11.	"Gypsy One" (with Matt Haimovitz and Joan Jeanrenaud)	Haimovitz; Jeanrenaud; Wasserman	4:14
12.	"Gypsy Two" (with Matt Haimovitz and Joan Jeanrenaud)	Haimovitz; Jeanrenaud; Wasserman	3:35
13.	"American Popsicle" (with Edie Brickell and Jerry Garcia)	Brickell; Garcia; Wasserman	4:41
Total length:			56:50
