= Tom Blessing IV =

American film producer

Thomas E. Blessing IV is an independent film and television producer and project manager from Yellow Springs, Ohio. He is known for his role as a production manager (line-producer) on the television series pilot Loveline (1996), for his production management work with Dick Clark Productions and co-producing the experimental feature film Irish Whiskey (1997). He co-produced the award-winning documentary film The Power of Community: How Cuba Survived Peak Oil (2006). Since September 2006 he has managed and developed musical touring acts including Boombox, The Werks, Fiddleworms and others. Blessing co-created The Werk Out Music and Arts Festival (2010-2012) and manages live events such as Hookahville Music Festival, a popular event that has been produced twice a year since 1992 in Ohio and founded by the band Əkoostik hookah.

Blessing consults, develops and manages talent and project-oriented business endeavors for entertainment and education through the company he and attorney Nathan J. Elter founded in 1997, AlchemyHouse Productions, Inc., based in Yellow Springs, Ohio, and Los Angeles, California. The "co-operation" strives to provide access bridges and knowledge to new and existing talent and markets by integrating Collective intelligence models on projects. Blessing is a technical production consultant, cinematic and still photographer.

The grandson of a "Black March" survivor and World War II POW (Stalag Luft IV); his father, Thomas E. Blessing III, is a past Greene County, Ohio, Commissioner and stockbroker; Blessing's mother, Jane, a lifelong school teacher. He grew up in rural Ohio, and graduated from Antioch University Midwest; earning a B.A. in the humanities and management majors and later received an M.A. in the team-based management program.

== Partial filmography ==
- The 52nd Annual Golden Globe Awards (1995) (TV)
- 31st Academy of Country Music Awards (1995) (TV)
- SeaWorld Busch Gardens Party for the Planet (1995) (TV)
- Jerry Lewis Stars Across America (1995) (TV)
- Loveline Pilot Episode (1996) (TV)
- Irish Whiskey (1997)
- The Power of Community: How Cuba Survived Peak Oil (2006)
