= Jemimah Puddleduck =

American rock band (1999–2011)

- John Molo (left) and Mark Karan (right) performing with Jemimah Puddleduck in 2005

Background information
- Also known as: Mark Karan & Jemimah Puddleduck
- Origin: San Francisco, CA, USA
- Genre: Rock
- Years active: 1999 - 2011
- Labels: Quacktone, Dig Ryko
- Past members: Mark Karan; Bob Gross; John "JT" Thomas; Billy Lee Lewis; John Molo; Arlan Schierbaum; Carlo Nuccio; Robin Sylvester; Joe Chirco; Wally Ingram
- Website: www.markkaran.com

Jemimah Puddleduck was an American rock band led by Bob Weir & RatDog lead guitarist Mark Karan. In addition to Karan the band also included Billy Lee Lewis on drums, Bob Gross or Robin Sylvester on bass and John "JT" Thomas or Mookie Siegel on keyboards.

== History ==
The band was formed in 1999 by Karan, drummer John Molo (Bruce Hornsby, Phil Lesh & Friends), bassist Bob Gross (Albert King) and keyboardist Arlan Schierbaum (Richie Kotzen). They released one self titled album in 2000. Since then, they have performed over 100 rare shows while members still maintain their separate touring careers. Schierbaum was replaced by John "JT" Thomas and the full band played on several songs on Mark Karan's debut solo album, Walk Through the Fire.

In 2009 John Molo was replaced on drums by Wally Ingram due to scheduling conflicts with Moonalice. Drummer Carlo Nuccio did a few dates in 2009. In 2010 the band performed at the Nateva Festival, Furthur Festival, and several other smaller festivals around the US.

The band has not performed since 2011. On November 23, 2015, drummer Billy Lee Lewis died from cancer.

== Discography ==
- Jemimah Puddleduck (2000)
- Walk Through the Fire - Mark Karan (2009) (tracks 1, 3, 10 and 11)
