= Wynne Paris =

American singer-songwriter (1964 - 2021)

- Born: June 22, 1964; Redstone Arsenal, AL
- Died: March 22, 2021 (aged 56)
- Genres: kirtan, new-age, worldbeat
- Occupations: singer, instrumentalist
- Instruments: guitar, sarod, harmonium, saz
- Years active: 1980s - present
- Member of: Groovananda
- Website: www.wynneparis.com

Wynne Paris (born June 22, 1964, in Redstone Arsenal, Alabama) was a new-age and world beat musician/producer with a special focus on yoga music and kirtan, the call-and-response singing of Bhakti yoga. His live performance combines Kirtan chanting, American music (jazz, gospel music, blues and rock music), world beat rhythms and raga scales. He sings in both English and Sanskrit. Paris plays a variety of musical instruments which include the guitar, sarod (a 26 stringed, sitar-like instrument from India), harmonium, saz (a stringed instrument in the lute family) and percussion. Wynne Paris died suddenly of a heart attack on March 22, 2021.

== Career ==
Paris began his career as a musician in the 1980s as a rock & roll and rhythm & blues guitar artist, performing with artists like Rusted Root's Jim Donovan, and Mark Karan of the rock band RatDog. In 1994, Wynne took up Indian music and yoga, changing the direction of his music. In 1996, one of the songs he co-wrote with Maura Moynihan, "Prayer for the Pure Land", won first place in the Songwriters' Association of Washington National Songwriting Contest. Also in that year, he met the Indian "hugging saint" Mata Amritanandamayi, known to her devotees as Ammachi or Amma, which inspired him to move to Marin County to study Indian music, shamanism, and yoga.

Since 1998, Paris has primarily performed and recorded New Age and World Beat music with an Indian influence, performing kirtan chanting and playing both Western and traditional Indian musical instruments. He appeared on the first album of Krishna Das, Pilgrim Heart (1998), who is known for popularising kirtan music in the West. This album also featured Sting.

Paris released his debut album, Ghandarva Café in 2004, which was followed by Emptiness and Ecstasy (2005) and Omspun, featuring Groovananda, in (2009).

Over the years, Paris has recorded with many notable musicians in these genres including Krishna Das, Badal Roy (Miles Davis), Shahin and Sepehr, Sharon Gannon, Bhagavan Das, David Newman, Wade Morissette, Rick Allen, Guru Ganesha Singh Khalsa, Mark Karan (Bob Weir & RatDog), Perry Robinson, Hans Christian, Dave Stringer, and Girish.

Paris played for a "Yoga Ball" celebrating President Barack Obama's second inauguration at St. Francis Hall in Northeast Washington, D.C., on January 22, 2013.

== Groovananda ==
Paris is the creative director of Groovananda (which means "the bliss of the groove"), a collective of musicians formed in 2005 the core consisting of Paris, Rick Allen (Def Leppard) and John "JT" Thomas (Bruce Hornsby Band), who play rock-and-jazz-influenced kirtan. On May 14, 2010, he and Groovananda were part of a benefit in Washington, D.C., for the Bonobo Conservation Initiative. They have produced a single, Tara Om, with Krishna Das, and one CD, Omspun, released in 2011, both by Auspician Records. Besides the core band members, it featured Badal Roy, Perry Robinson, Mark Karan, Hans Christian, John Wubbenhorst and several others, and vocalists including Krishna Das and Dave Stringer.

== Lovelight Yoga & Arts Festival ==
For the first time in 2016, Lovelight Yoga & Arts Festival brought together multiple communities for a celebration of yoga, kirtan, flow arts, meditation, learning, and healing.

Woodstock Music & Art Fair producer Michael Lang, musician Wynne Paris, and Kimberley Maddox co-produced the event, which brought dozens of musicians and accomplished yoga instructors from across the country to share their practice and knowledge with attendees of all ages.

The festival was held at Camp Ramblewood, located in proximity to Darlington, Maryland.

A second installment of this annual event was scheduled to take place on August 18–21, 2017.

== Performance venues ==
- Constitution Hall in Washington, D.C.
- National Zoo - Smithsonian music series
- Millennium Celebration in Washington, D.C.
- Willow Tree Yoga Center in Washington, D.C.
- (CBGB's) CB's Gallery in New York City
- Health and Harmony Festival in Sonoma, California
- Karmapalooza Yoga Festival in Miami, Florida
- Starwood Festival in Pomeroy, Ohio
- Taos Yoga Center in Taos, New Mexico
- Holy Cow Yoga Center in Charleston, South Carolina
- Three Rivers Yoga Studio in Pittsburgh, Pennsylvania
- Elysian Fields Yoga in Saint Simons Island, Georgia
- Omkar Ashram in Colorado

=== With Krishna Das ===
- The Omega Institute in Rhinebeck, New York
- The Jivamukti Yoga Center in New York City, New York
- Yogaville - The Satchidananda Ashram in Buckingham, Virginia
- ChantLanta Sacred Music Festival in Atlanta, Georgia

== Discography ==
- Inner and Outer Space – Caroline Casey (1996) Sounds True
- Playful Yoga: Movement & Meditation for All Ages – Various Artists (1998) White Swan Records
- Pilgrim Heart – Krishna Das (1998) Triloka/Mercury Records
- Drum Prayer – Steve Gordon (2002) Sequoia Records
- Planet Yoga – Krishna Das (composed music for single "Prayer to Rudra") (2002) Karuna
- Japa – Dave Stringer (Aug 08, 2002) Ajna Music
- Nostalgia – Shahin and Sepehr (2002) Higher Octave
- Chakra Healing Chants – Sophia Songhealer (Feb 04, 2003) Sequoia Records
- Ghandarva Café – Wynne Paris (March 2, 2004)
- Jai Ma: White Swan Yoga Masters, Vol. 2 CD – Various Artists (2004) White Swan Records
- Emptiness and Ecstasy – Wynne Paris (January 25, 2005) Auspician CD
- Yoga Salon – Various Artists (April 12, 2005) Sequoia Records
- All One – Krishna Das (Aug 23, 2005) Triloka
- Oshun Gaia – Amikaeyla Proudfoot Gaston & Ariana Lightningstorm (with Kiva) (2006) Amikaeyla and Ariana
- Arcana – Lisa Reagan (2006) Stillpoint Records
- Pure Ganesh – Guru Ganesha Singh (2007) Spirit Voyage
- The Journey Home – Gurunam Singh (February 29, 2008) (Played and Composed) Spirit Voyage
- Bhagavan Kripa: A Kirtan of Grace – Jojo and Yati Priya (Mar. 25th, 2008) Devotional Music Foundation
- Tara Om – Wynne Paris & Groovananda with Krishna Das (single) (April 1, 2008) Auspician
- Infinita – Lawson Rollins, (May 20, 2008) Infinita
- Maha Moha: The Great Delusion – Wade Imre Morissette (Sep. 16, 2008) Notone
- Love, Peace, Chant – David Newman (September 30, 2008) Nettwerk Records
- Get Free – (Oct. 17, 2008) True Nature
- Kundalini Meditation Music – Various Artists (September 22, 2009) Sounds True
- Head Over Heels – Mahbood Len Seligman (2010)
- Let Your Heart Be Known – Steve Gold (July 2011) Steve Gold Music
- Omspun – Wynne Paris & Groovananda (July 19, 2011) Auspician Records CD
- Ghandarva Café: Ecstatic Songs of Love & Devotion – Wynne Paris (Import CD) EMI (August 16, 2011)
- Change – Gurunam Singh (Jun 12, 2012) Spirit Voyage Music
- Heaven is Dancing – SuperTrine (single) (June 25, 2013) Auspician Records
