= Blessing (name) =

Blessing is both a surname and a given name. Notable people with the name include:

Surname:

- Donald Blessing (1905–2000), American Olympic coxswain
- Karl Blessing (1900–1971), German banker
- Lee Blessing (born 1949), American playwright
- Lou Blessing (born 1948), American politician
- Martin Blessing (born 1963), German banker
- Tom Blessing IV (born 1966), American film and television producer

Given name:

- Blessing Afrifah (born 2003), Israeli Olympic sprinter
- Blessing Chebundo (born 1958), Zimbabwean politician
- Blessing Chinedu (born 1976), Nigerian football player
- Blessing Kaku (born 1978), Nigerian football player
- Blessing Mahwire (born 1982), Zimbabwean cricketer
- Blessing Makunike (1977–2004), Zimbabwean football player
- Blessing Oborududu (born 1989), Nigerian wrestler
- Blessing Okagbare (born 1988), Nigerian athlete
- Blessing Okardi (born 1988), Nigerian football player
- Blessing Ufodiama (born 1981), Nigerian-American triple jumper
