= Mark Karan =

American guitarist and singer (born 1955)

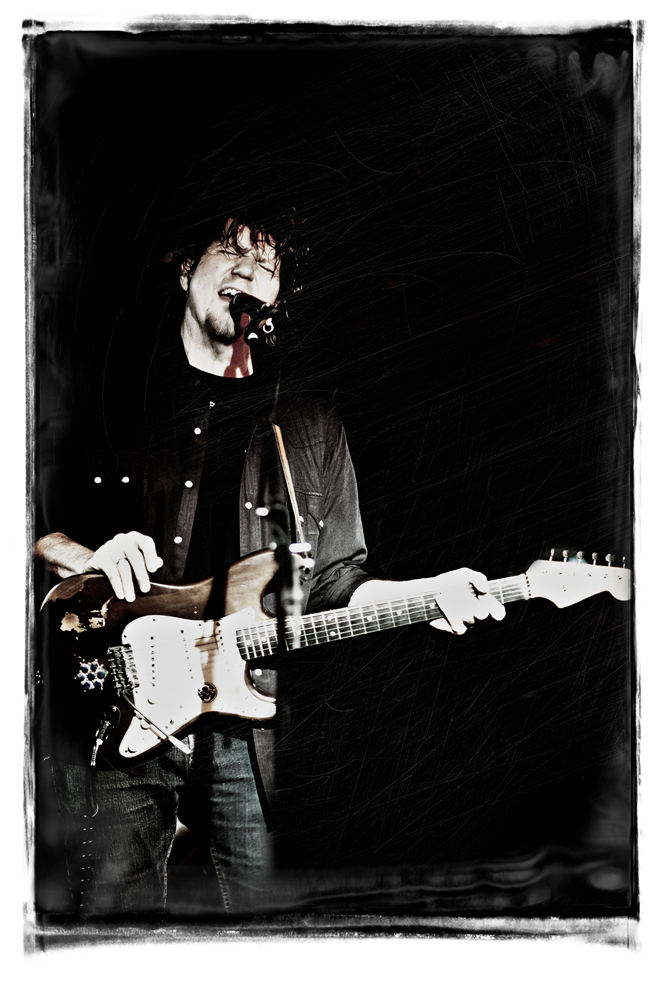

Background information
- Origin: San Francisco, California, United States
- Genres: Rock
- Occupation: Musician
- Instruments: Guitar, vocals
- Years active: 1986–present
- Label: Quacktone Records
- Website: www.markkaran.com

Mark Karan (born January 13, 1955) is an American guitarist and singer. He is best known for his long-term work with former members of the Grateful Dead, in RatDog (1998–2013), the Other Ones (1998–2000), Mickey Hart's band Planet Drum (1999), and Phil Lesh and Friends (2012). Karan has also played and toured with Terrapin Flyer, Delaney Bramlett, the Rembrandts, Sophie B. Hawkins, Dave Mason, and Paul Carrack.

Karan leads the bands Jemimah Puddleduck and Mark Karan's Buds. In 2009 he released a solo album, Walk Through the Fire.

== Career ==
Karan has played guitar and sung for a number of different artists, including Dave Mason, Huey Lewis, Paul Carrack, Delaney Bramlett, Sophie B. Hawkins, and The Rembrandts. From 1986 to 1989 he was the guitarist and co-producer for the band Slings & Arrows which included Daniel Levitin on bass.

In 1998 he was selected, along with Steve Kimock, to fill the lead guitar slot in The Other Ones, a band featuring former members of the Grateful Dead. He played with the Other Ones on their 1998 and 2000 tours, and appeared with the 1998 lineup on their only album, the live compilation "The Strange Remain" in 1999. He has also played with Mickey Hart's Planet Drum and Phil Lesh & Friends over the years.

In October 1998 Karan was asked to join RatDog, a band led by Grateful Dead alumnus Bob Weir. Karan was part of the RatDog lineup for most of the next 13 years. He also records or composes a wide variety of music for film, television, and music libraries. His contributions to TV alone can currently be heard on over 15 networks and internationally in over 25 countries.

On June 30, 2009, Karan released his debut album Walk Through the Fire to critical acclaim. It features Delaney Bramlett, Billy Payne, Mike Finnigan, Pete Sears, John Molo, Hutch Hutchinson, The Persuasions, The Rowan Brothers, and many more.

His TV appearances include Austin City Limits, VH1 Classic's All Star Jams, Late Night with Conan O'Brien, Late Late Night with Craig Kilborn, Today Show and Regis & Kathy Lee. Karan has also been showcased in live performances and featured interviews on SiriusXM, in addition to commercial and specialty radio nationwide.

Karan also sometimes tours while leading his own band. He performed with the band Live Dead '69 as part of the Airplane Family & Friends tour in December 2016. He has also performed with Live/Dead '69 at shows they have performed on their own. This band usually features former Grateful Dead keyboardist Tom Constanten and sometimes features Karan's RatDog bandmates Robin Sylvester and Jay Lane.

== Cancer battle ==
In July 2007, Karan announced that he was being treated for throat cancer. Steve Kimock sat in for Karan on the Ratdog summer tour. Karan returned to the lineup in March 2008 and remains in remission.

== Touring credits ==
- Paul Carrack – USA Tour (1988)
- Dave Mason – World Tours (1991, 1992)
- Sophie B. Hawkins – USA & Australian Tours (1996)
- The Other Ones – USA Tour (1998, 2000)
- Bob Weir & RatDog – USA Tours (1998–2013)
- Mickey Hart's Planet Drum – USA Summer Tour (1999, inc."Woodstock '99")
- Delaney Bramlett – Mississippi Tour (2006)

== Discography ==
=== Solo work ===
- Jemimah Puddleduck (2000) – Jemimah Puddleduck
- Walk Through the Fire (2009) – Mark Karan

=== Bands / live ===
- The Strange Remain (1999) – The Other Ones
- Evening Moods (2000) – Ratdog
- Live at Roseland (2001) – Ratdog
- On the Road: 07-02-06 Red Rocks (2006) – String Cheese Incident

=== Album sessions ===
- Temptation (1981) – Holly Stanton
- Beyond Passion (1990) – Sky
- Chopped & Channeled (1991) – Dynatones
- Makin' It Real (1993) – Jesse Colin Young
- Exception to the Rule (1994) – Arnold McCuller
- Crazy Boy (1995) – Jesse Colin Young
- Moment of Truth (1996) – Jack James
- Chicago Songs (1996) – Skip Haynes
- Well (1996) – David Grow
- Coast of Paradise (1996) – Suzy K
- Open the Door (1998) – Janet Robin
- Hindsight (1998) – John Purdell
- Spin This! (1998) – Danny Wilde & The Rembrants
- Still Searching for Soul (1999) – Corey Feldman's Truth Movement
- Mister Blue (1999) – Mr. Blue
- Pieces (1999) – P.J. Levy
- Sounds from Home (2000) – Delaney Bramlett
- Former Child Actor (2002) – Corey Feldman
- Blue Sky (2003) – David Ralston
- The Whole Enchilada (2003) – Teresa James
- Emptiness and Ecstasy (2004) – Wynne Paris
- Still Dancin' (2006) – G 13
- Khemmenu: Land of the Moon (2006) – Sky
- Crossing the Line (2008) – Bill Cutler
- Live/Studio Closet Tapes (2008) – The Moonlighters (Bill Kirchen, Richard Casanova, Tony Johnson, Steve MacKay)
- A New Kind Of Blues (2008) – Delaney Bramlett
- Persuasions of the Dead: The Grateful Dead Sessions (2011) – The Persuasions & Friends
- Family Business (2019) – Ronnie Penque

=== Compilation albums ===
- Bad Sci-Fi Soundtrack Series: Attack Of The Killer B Movies (1995) – various artists – performed with Scarecrow Adams)
- Further Most (2000) – "Ramble On Rose" and "Easy Answers", performed by the Other Ones
- KBCO Studio C, Volume 12 (2000) – "Odessa", performed by Bob Weir & Ratdog
- KPRI Live Tracks 3 (2002) – "KC Moan", performed by Bob Weir & Mark Karan
- Weir Here - The Best of Bob Weir (2004) – Bob Weir
- KBCO Studio C, Volume 16 (2005) – "Ripple", performed by Bob Weir & Ratdog
- KPFA Live From Berkeley (2005) – "Memphis Radio", performed by Jemimah Puddleduck
- Jam on Guitars (2009) – various artists
- KPFA Live From Berkeley, Vol 2 (2012) – "Leave a Light On", performed by A Mark Karan Experience

=== Singles sessions ===
- "Run to Her" (1983) – Julie Stafford

=== Film and TV soundtracks ===
- Chantilly Lace (1993) – Showtime (Patrick Seymour, composer) – guitar
- Parallel Lives (1994) – Showtime (Patrick Seymour, composer) – guitar
- Stonewall (1995) – (Michael Kamen, composer) – guitar
- Orleans (1997) – CBS dramatic series (David Hamilton, composer) – guitar
- Tricks (1997) – Showtime (Patrick Seymour, composer, also includes original song by MK & Patrick Seymour) – guitar
- Waco: The Rules of Engagement (1996, Academy Award Nominated) – (David Hamilton, composer) – guitar
- Scrubs (2001) – NBC (Jan Stevens/MK co-composers) – guitar
- Fall of Night (2005) – MK original song "No Escape" – closing credit roll
- Asylum (2009) (David Hamilton, composer) – guitar
- Guitar Man (2015) – guitar on two songs on the soundtrack: "All Along the Watchtower" and "Love in Vain"
