= Modereko =

ModeReko
- Origin: United States
- Genres: Jazz, Jam
- Years active: 2001 – present
- Labels: Blue Thumb
- Members: John Molo; Zac Rae; Tim Kobza; Bobby Read; Dan Conway; John 'JT' Thomas

Modereko is a jazz band, featuring drummer John Molo of Bruce Hornsby and the Range. The group has released two albums, Modereko, and Solar Igniter, a collaboration with jam/rock musician Keller Williams.
