= Modereko (album) =

Studio album by Modereko
- Released: May 8, 2001
- Genre: Jazz Jam
- Label: Blue Thumb
- Producer: Modereko

Modereko chronology
Modereko (2001)	Solar Igniter (2003)

Professional ratings
Review scores
Source	Rating
Allmusic	2.5/5 stars
The Music Box	3/5 stars

Modereko is the debut album from jazz band Modereko, a side project of drummer John Molo (of Bruce Hornsby and the Range), released in 2001.

== Track listing ==
1. Sahara Sod 3:59
2. Some of That! 2:15
3. Glitterati 3:14
4. Tree Blind 4:38
5. Nitrous 3:25
6. L.A. - Va 2:45
7. Slump Town 3:22
8. Old Creed
9. Schoolin 4:18
10. Heart of Seoul 4:09
11. Bonus Track

== Album credits ==
- Kevin Davis - Percussion
- Jimmy Haslip - Bass
- T.J. Johnson - Mandolin
- Tim Kobza - Organ, Bass
- Modereko - Producer
- John Molo - Percussion
- Dave Palmer - Keyboards
- Zac Rae - Organ, Bass, Wurlitzer
- Bobby Read - Tenor Saxophone, Woodwinds
- Bruce Richardson - Remixing
