= The Strange Remain =

Live album by the Other Ones
- Released: February 9, 1999
- Recorded: June–July, 1998
- Genre: Rock
- Length: 148:11
- Label: Arista
- Producer: The Other Ones

The Strange Remain is a live album by the rock band the Other Ones. It was recorded live on the Furthur Festival tour in 1998 and released in 1999. The album reached number one on Billboard's Top Heatseekers chart and number 112 on the Billboard 200.

The Other Ones was a rock group composed of former members of the Grateful Dead. They later changed their name to the Dead. The Strange Remain is the only album released by either the Other Ones or the Dead.

== Critical reception ==
Professional ratings
Review scores
Source	Rating
AllMusic	4/5 stars
Jambands: The Complete Guide to the Players, Music, & Scene	4.5/5 stars
Rolling Stone	3/5 stars

On AllMusic, Michael B. Smith said, "Some members of the media have called The Other Ones the 'ultimate Dead cover band,' but this group is far from a cover band. The Other Ones' versions of Dead songs are immaculate, and many times they prove to be actually better than the Dead versions. Soaring saxophone, Hornsby's on-target piano, and the other 'new' band members add a whole new set of colors to the palette.... Garcia's spirit is alive and well, and The Other Ones are the perfect successors to the Grateful Dead empire. Fans can delight in the sheer spirit that comes through by way of this live document."

In Rolling Stone, Marc Weingarten wrote, "On this double-CD set, the band shows off its tight interplay. Guitarist Steve Kimock's slippery-necked leads capture the feel, if not the fire, of Jerry Garcia's playing, and drummer John Molo provides the kind of sturdy, in-the-pocket grooves that the Dead frequently lacked.... On The Strange Remain, The Other Ones provide plenty of reasons for loyalists to hold out hope for yet another tour."

Author Dean Budnick praised the "particularly assertive expressions" by Ellis and Hornsby, and commented: "There is a vibrancy to the disc as the Dead challenges itself, reinterpreting its catalog and delving deeper into its jazz vocabulary, with results that are often absorbing."

A reviewer for All About Jazz stated that the album "is proof positive that the improvisational musical voyage into the great unknown is not some fancy description for half-baked musicians to hang their hat on. It is the muse for a collective of uniquely individual and extremely talented musicians to create timeless, pure, inspired music."

== Track listing ==
Disc one

1. "St. Stephen" / "The Eleven" (Jerry Garcia, Phil Lesh, Robert Hunter / Lesh, Hunter) – 13:55
2. "Jack Straw" (Bob Weir, Hunter) – 7:11
3. "Sugaree" (Garcia, Hunter) – 12:05
4. "Corrina" (Weir, Mickey Hart, Hunter) – 10:54
5. "Only the Strange Remain" (Hart, Hunter) – 8:18
6. "White-Wheeled Limousine" (Bruce Hornsby) – 7:31
7. "Estimated Prophet" (Weir, John Perry Barlow) – 14:51

Disc two

1. "Playing in the Band" (Weir, Hart, Hunter) – 11:58
2. "The Other One" (Weir, Bill Kreutzmann) – 8:10
3. "Banyan Tree" (Weir, Hart, Hunter) – 8:31
4. "Rainbow's Cadillac" (Hornsby) – 11:26
5. "Mountains of the Moon" (Garcia, Hunter) – 5:16
6. "Friend of the Devil" (Garcia, John Dawson, Hunter) – 6:43
7. "Baba Jingo" (Hart, Hunter) – 8:01
8. "China Cat Sunflower" / "I Know You Rider" (Garcia, Hunter / traditional, arranged by Grateful Dead) – 13:18

== Personnel ==
=== The Other Ones ===
- Bob Weir – guitar, vocals
- Phil Lesh – bass, vocals
- Mickey Hart – percussion, RAMU, vocals
- Bruce Hornsby – piano, keyboards, vocals
- Dave Ellis – saxophone, vocals
- Steve Kimock – guitar
- Mark Karan – guitar, vocals
- John Molo – drums

=== Production ===
- Produced by the Other Ones
- Mastered by Tom Flye, Jeffrey Norman, Paul Stubblebine
- Mixed by Tom Flye, Mickey Hart, Bob Weir, Bruce Hornsby
- Remote audio recording by Tom Flye, Eric Johnston, Ted Barela, Charlie Bouis
- Album coordination by Cameron Sears
- Artwork by Richard Biffle
- Photography by Susana Millman
