= Live (Weir/Wasserman album) =

1998 live album by Bob Weir and Rob Wasserman

Live album by Bob Weir and Rob Wasserman
- Released: January 13, 1998
- Recorded: 1988, 1992
- Genre: Rock
- Length: 77:08
- Label: Grateful Dead
- Producer: Rob Wasserman

Bob Weir chronology
Kingfish in Concert: King Biscuit Flower Hour (1996)	Live (1998)	Evening Moods (2000)

Rob Wasserman chronology
Trios (1994)	Live (1998)	Space Island (2000)

Professional ratings
Review scores
Source	Rating
AllMusic	4.5/5 stars
The Music box	4/5 stars

Live is an album by Bob Weir and Rob Wasserman. It was recorded in the fall of 1988, except for one track, "Eternity", which was recorded in the summer of 1992. The album was released in 1998.

== Track listing ==
1. "Festival" (Bob Weir) – 4:48
2. "Walkin' Blues" (Robert Johnson) – 4:15
3. "The Winners" (Weir, Rudyard Kipling) – 4:00
4. "K.C. Moan" (Traditional) – 3:54
5. "Victim or the Crime" (Weir, Gerrit Graham) – 4:29
6. "Looks Like Rain" (Weir, John Perry Barlow) – 7:58
7. "Easy to Slip" (Martin Kibbee, Lowell George) – 7:13
8. "Fever" (John Davenport, Eddie Cooley) – 4:18
9. "Eternity" (Weir, Rob Wasserman, Willie Dixon) – 6:00
10. "This Time Forever" (Weir, Barlow) – 4:31
11. "Shade of Grey" (Weir, Barlow) – 4:41
12. "Heaven Help the Fool" (Weir, Barlow) – 7:09
13. "Blue Sky Bop" (Wasserman) – 3:28
14. "Throwing Stones" (Weir, Barlow) – 10:21

== Personnel ==
=== Musicians ===
- Bob Weir–acoustic guitar, vocals
- Rob Wasserman–electric upright bass

=== Production ===
- Produced by Rob Wasserman
- Recorded by John Cutler (fall 1988), except "Eternity" recorded by Howard Danchik (summer 1992)
- Mastered by Joe Gastwirt
- Mastering assisted by Ramón Bretón
- Cover and back photo by Rob Cohn
- Inside photos by Jay Blakesberg
- Package design by Amy Finkle
- Liner notes by Rob Wasserman and Bob Weir
