= Steve Kimock =

American rock guitarist (born 1955)

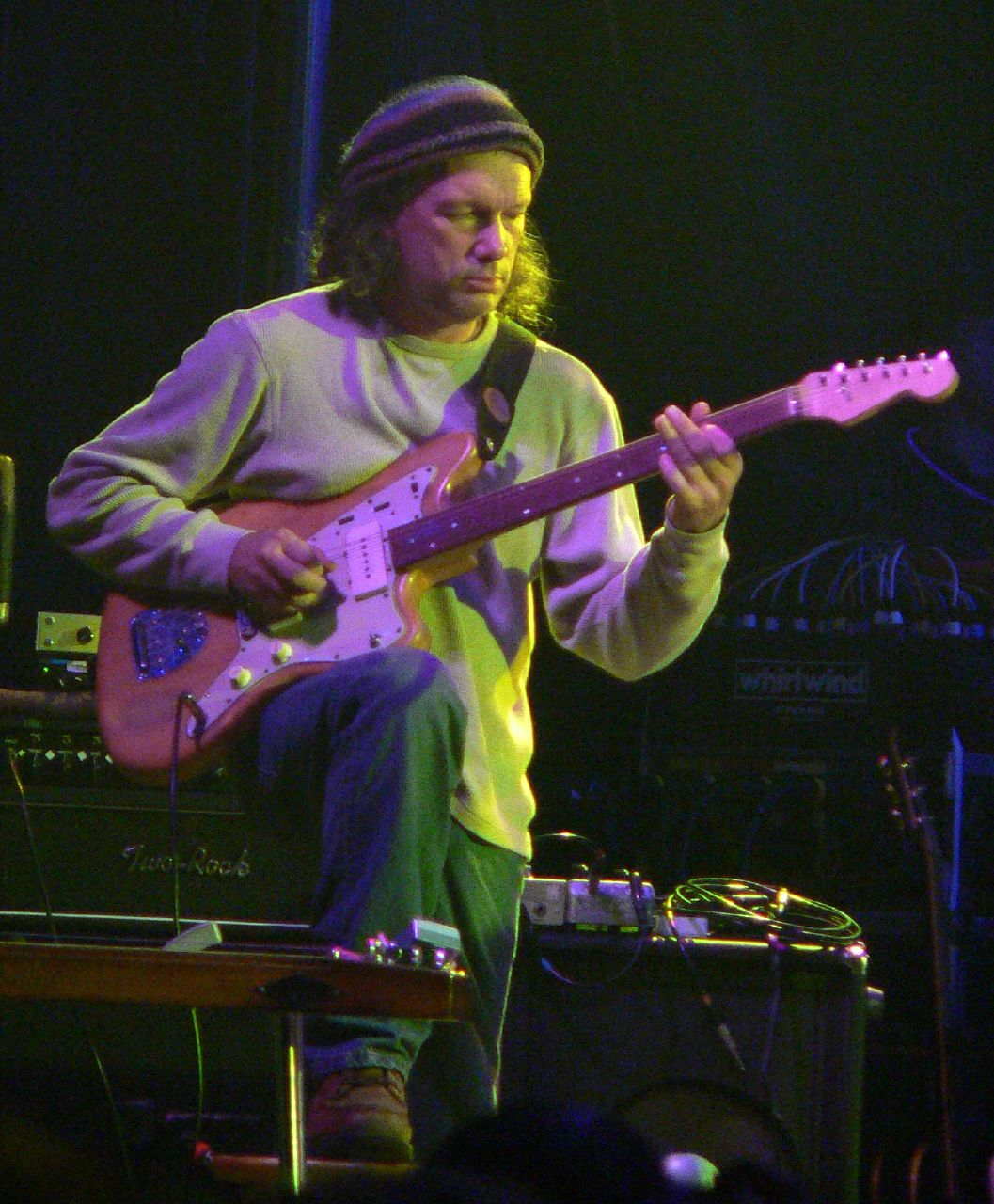
- Kimock performing in August 2006

Background information
- Born: October 5, 1955 (age 70); Bethlehem, Pennsylvania, U.S.
- Genres: Jam rock; jazz-rock; instrumental rock
- Occupations: Musician, songwriter
- Instrument: Guitar
- Years active: 1974–present
- Label: SCI Fidelity
- Website: www.kimock.com

Steve Kimock (born October 5, 1955) is an American rock guitarist. He was a member of San Francisco Bay Area bands Zero and KVHW.

His tone and some of his playing approach has been compared to Jerry Garcia, who was a friend of his, and he has been affiliated with musicians connected to Grateful Dead, including the bands the Other Ones, RatDog, and Phil Lesh and Friends. Garcia cited Kimock, along with Frank Gambale and Michael Hedges, as his favorite guitar players during the later part of his life.

== Early life and education ==
Kimock was born in Bethlehem, Pennsylvania in the Lehigh Valley region of eastern Pennsylvania on October 5, 1955, to his parents Joseph and Mildred Kimock. He briefly attended Liberty High School, but was expelled in his freshman year. He was subsequently sent to the Lehigh Centennial School.

== Career ==
In the mid-1970s, Kimock moved to San Francisco to play guitar with the folk-rock group the Goodman Brothers. In 1979, after working with Martin Fierro in the salsa band the Underdogs, he joined the Heart of Gold Band with Keith Godchaux, Donna Jean Godchaux, and drummer Greg Anton. Other groups that Kimock has played with include KVHW, which he formed with Bobby Vega, Ray White, and Alan Hertz, and the Steve Kimock Band, which included drummer Rodney Holmes.

In 1984, Kimock, Anton, and John Cipollina, formerly of Quicksilver Messenger Service, co-founded the instrumental psychedelic rock group Zero. When Judge Murphy joined the band in 1991, it was no longer instrumental. The album Chance in a Million had songs written by lyricist Robert Hunter of the Grateful Dead. Zero toured and recorded until 2000. Band members included Chip Roland, Melvin Seals, Liam Hanrahan, Pete Sears, Bobby Vega, Nicky Hopkins, and Vince Welnick. In March 2006, Zero reunited and toured until the death of Martin Fierro two years later. The band reunited again in 2011 for the twentieth anniversary of the Chance in a Million recording sessions. They played a benefit concert at the Great American Music Hall for Judge Murphy, who had cancer.

Kimock has toured and recorded with many Grateful Dead-themed bands, including Keith and Donna Godchaux's Heart of Gold Band (1979–80), Bob Weir's Kingfish (1986), Merl Saunders and the Rainforest Band (1990–91), Vince Welnick's Missing Man Formation (1996–97), Phil Lesh and Friends (1998–99), and The Other Ones (1998–2000). He was also a member of the Rhythm Devils in 2006, a supergroup formed by Grateful Dead drummers Bill Kreutzmann and Mickey Hart, also featuring Mike Gordon of Phish. In July 2007, Kimock was asked to fill in for a few months for Mark Karan in Bob Weir's RatDog and rejoined Ratdog in 2013. In October 2016, Kimock was added to Bob Weir's Campfire touring band in support of Weir's 2016 solo release Blue Mountain. He tours with his own band, Steve Kimock & Friends and occasionally Zero. He has also toured with Jorma Kaukonen and Hot Tuna throughout the past decade and is an instructor at Jorma's Fur Peace guitar camp.

In addition to those affiliations, Kimock also toured and recorded with Jerry Joseph's Little Women (1988), with Henry Kaiser and Freddy Roulette as The Psychedelic Guitar Circus (1993), and as Steve Kimock & Friends (early 1990s). In 2001, he recorded with Pete Sears on his album The Long Haul. Kimock featured on two recordings by Bruce Hornsby (Big Swing Face and Here Come the Noise Makers), and toured as featured guitarist with Hornsby and his band in 2002. Kimock was also featured along with Bobby Vega and Jimmy Sanchez in the Pete Sears written soundtrack for the film, The Fight in the Fields: Cesar Chavez and the Farmworkers' Struggle.

Kimock released a solo record Last Danger of Frost (2016), and Satellite City (KIMOCK, 2017) with his son John Kimock and singer/multi-instrumentalist Leslie Mendelson.

Kimock was a member of Jazz is Dead on its 2023 tour.

== Personal life ==
Kimock has been married since 2000 to Jennifer Kimock and has four children. In 2019, he moved back to Bethlehem, Pennsylvania in the Lehigh Valley.

== Discography ==
- Here Goes Nothin' – Zero (1987)
- Nothin' Goes Here – Zero (1989)
- Go Hear Nothin' – Zero (1991)
- Chance in a Million – Zero (1994)
- SK&F – Steve Kimock and Friends (1995)
- The Psychedelic Guitar Circus – Henry Kaiser, Steve Kimock, Harvey Mandel, Freddie Roulette (1996)
- Zero – Zero (1996)
- Nothin' Lasts Forever – Zero (1998)
- Live In Concert – KVHW (1998)
- The Strange Remain – The Other Ones (1999)
- Love Will See You Through – Phil Lesh and Friends (1999)
- East Meets West – Steve Kimock Band (2002)
- Live in Colorado – Steve Kimock Band (2002)
- Double Zero – Zero (2002)
- Zero Blues – Zero (2002)
- Live in Colorado, Vol. 2 – Steve Kimock Band (2004)
- Eudemonic – Steve Kimock Band (2005)
- Big Red Barn Sessions – Steve Kimock & Billy Goodman (2008)
- Absolute Zero – Zero (2011)
- Last Danger of Frost – Steve Kimock (2016)
- Satellite City – KIMOCK (2017)
