= Robin Sylvester =

English musician (1950–2022)

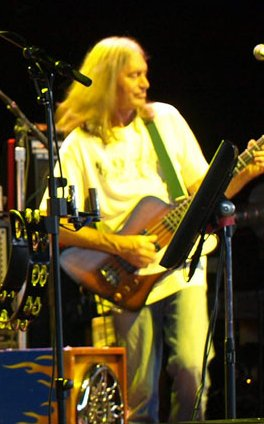
- Sylvester in 2009

Background information
- Born: 1950; Hampstead, London, England
- Died: 29 October 2022 (aged 71–72)
- Occupations: Bassist, sound engineer
- Years active: Late 1960s–2022

Robin Sylvester (1950 – 29 October 2022) was an English musician who was best known as a member of the American band RatDog. Although primarily a bass player, he played several instruments, including the guitar and keyboards, and did extensive arranging.

Sylvester began his professional music career with the a cappella London Boy Singers chorus in the 1960s, and as a sound engineer in 1969. Working as an assistant at Abbey Road Studios when The Beatles recorded their eponymous album, he was inspired by Paul McCartney to take up the bass guitar. He also used early synthesisers while playing with and producing Byzantium in 1971. While touring with Dana Gillespie, he moved to the United States in 1974. Clive Davis signed his folk-rock band The Movies to Arista Records; the band played around New York and Los Angeles in the late 1970s. Then, as a session musician, he worked alongside Steve Douglas, backing the Beach Boys and Ry Cooder. He also played in live acts led by Marty Balin, Mary Wells, The Shirelles, The Coasters, The Drifters, Billy Preston, Christine McVie, Steve Seskin, Bo Diddley, Chuck Berry, Freddy Fender, Del Shannon, and Vince Welnick's Missing Man Formation.

Sylvester also worked with ex-Fleetwood Mac member Bob Welch in his band as a bass player for his concert Live from the Roxy in West Hollywood on November 19th 1981. The concert was officially released as an album in 2004.

In 2003, he replaced Rob Wasserman as RatDog's bass player. He played his first show on 4 March 2003.

== Final years and death ==
Sylvester missed RatDog's 2010 shows in Jamaica due to health concerns; Wasserman substituted. Sylvester continued to play occasional shows with jam band alumni like Stu Allen, Ghosts of Electricity, Melvin Seals and JGB, David Nelson & Friends, Jemimah Puddleduck, and the Rubber Souldiers.

Sylvester's death was announced on 29 October 2022 by his RatDog bandmate Mark Karan and later confirmed by Relix.
