= Solar Igniter =

Studio album by Modereko
- Released: 2003
- Genre: Jazz
- Label: Harmonized Records
- Producer: John Molo

Modereko chronology
Modereko (2001)	Solar Igniter (2003)

Professional ratings
Review scores
Source	Rating
Allmusic	not rated
JazzReview.com	not rated link
The Music Box	link

Solar Igniter is the second album from jazz band Modereko, a side project of drummer John Molo (of Bruce Hornsby and the Range), released in 2003. The album features an appearance by Keller Williams, who in addition to performing on the album, also helped to write some of the songs.

== Track listing ==
1. Seven Heaven 5:01
2. El Kabong 4:58
3. Getaway Float 4:26
4. Huckleberry 5:52
5. Take It Out 3:59
6. 35 Rooms 3:27
7. Travel by Balloon 4:39
8. Tronic 2:54
9. Solar Igniter 5:25
10. Snake Charmer 3:59
11. Miracles 4:12
12. Allman Joy 3:37
13. Soul Cheese 5:09
14. Celebrate Your Youth 10:02

== Album credits ==
- J. Collier - Bass, Guest Appearance
- Danny Conway - Bass, Group Member
- John D'earth - Sampling
- Joe Gastwirt - Mastering
- Tim Kobza - Bass, Guitar, Vocals, Producer, Group Member
- Rani Laik - Artwork
- John Molo - Percussion, Drums, Vocals, Producer, Loops, Group Member
- Zac Rae - Keyboards, Guest Appearance, Interlude
- Bobby Read Clarinet, Flute, Keyboards, Saxophone, Vocals, Producer, Group Member
- Jimmy Thomas Organ, Synthesizer, Wurlitzer, Group Member
- Keller Williams Vocals, Guest Appearance
