= Evening Moods =

2000 studio album by RatDog with Bob Weir

Studio album by RatDog
- Released: September 26, 2000
- Genre: Rock
- Length: 73:49
- Label: Grateful Dead
- Producer: Mike McGinn and the Blotter Brothers

Bob Weir chronology
Live (1998)	Evening Moods (2000)	Live at Roseland (2001)

Evening Moods is the only studio album by the band RatDog, featuring former Grateful Dead guitarist and singer Bob Weir. Released on 26 September 2000, it consists of a number of new songs introduced by RatDog during the previous year and a Grateful Dead song, "Corrina". Grateful Dead drummer Mickey Hart makes a guest appearance on a few tracks. "Ashes and Glass" and "Two Djinn" are both included on Weir Here – The Best of Bob Weir.

Weir has continued to play tracks from the album with his band Bobby Weir & Wolf Bros. Furthermore, "Even So" has been played by Dead & Company on a few occasions, in remembrance of RatDog bassist Rob Wasserman, who frequently collaborated with Weir outside of the band.

== Reception ==
Professional ratings
Review scores
Source	Rating
AllMusic	3/5 stars
Jambands.com	Positive
The Music Box	4/5 stars
Jambands: The Complete Guide to the Players, Music, & Scene	4/5 stars
The Virgin Encyclopedia of Jazz	3/5 stars

In a review for AllMusic, Zac Johnson stated that the album "shouldn't disappoint hungry Deadheads," and noted that "the bluesy/folky/country/jazz feel of the Dead's live sets have been reborn in this incarnation."

Rob S. Turner of Jambands.com commented: "This is a fine release that should win over even the most anti-Weir Grateful Dead fans. And for those of us who have hung with him for all these years, this release is sweet, so very, very sweet!"

The Music Box's John Metzger remarked that, on Evening Moods, Weir "finally finds his voice and comes into his own." He stated: "This is his band. These are his songs. And with the exception of 'Corrina', the Grateful Dead machine had nothing to do with their formation." He concluded: "it's an album that both avid and casual Deadheads ought to celebrate."

Author Dean Budnick noted that, for the most part, the album "focuses on compositions debuted and developed by RatDog," and stated that it "may be Weir's strongest studio effort, with subtle accents providing equipoise to snarling leads."

In an article for The Washington Post, Mike Joyce wrote: "the music on Evening Moods doesn't sound as if it's coming from a toothless jam band. While Weir sometimes celebrates his love for vintage blues and rock with all the vocal power he can muster... the band's rhythm section... is never overshadowed for long."

The Marquee's Brandon Daviet stated that the album "ranks up there with the best of The Grateful Dead's studio excursions like Built To Last, Terrapin Station and of course Workingman’s Dead," and commented: "Weir... has firmly grasped what the majority of 'Deadheads', new and old, want."

== Track listing ==
Evening Moods
No.	Title	Writer(s)	Length
1.	"Bury Me Standing"	Gerrit Graham, Jeff Chimenti, Mark Karan, Jay Lane, Mike McGinn, Rob Wasserman, Bob Weir	9:03
2.	"Lucky Enough"	John Perry Barlow, Chimenti, Karan, Lane, McGinn, Wasserman, Weir	5:10
3.	"Odessa"	Graham, Russ Ellis, Chimenti, Dave Ellis, Karan, Lane, McGinn, Wasserman, Weir	6:13
4.	"Ashes and Glass"	Andre Pessis, Chimenti, D. Ellis, Karan, Lane, McGinn, Wasserman, Weir	5:55
5.	"Welcome to the World"	Barlow, Chimenti, Karan, Lane, McGinn, Wasserman, Weir	6:51
6.	"Two Djinn"	Graham, Chimenti, Karan, Lane, McGinn, Wasserman, Weir	9:04
7.	"Corrina"	Robert Hunter, Mickey Hart, Weir	8:50
8.	"October Queen"	Pessis, Chimenti, D. Ellis, Karan, Matthew Kelly, Lane, McGinn, Wasserman, Weir	7:45
9.	"The Deep End"	Chimenti, Karan, Lane, McGinn, Wasserman, Weir	5:17
10.	"Even So"	Graham, Chimenti, D. Ellis, Karan, Kelly, Lane, McGinn, Wasserman, Weir	9:41
Total length:			73:49

== Personnel ==
=== RatDog ===
- Bob Weir - lead vocals, rhythm guitar, slide guitar
- Jeff Chimenti - keyboards, background vocals
- Mark Karan - lead guitar, background vocals
- Jay Lane - drums, background vocals
- Rob Wasserman - double bass

=== Additional personnel ===
- Kenny Brooks - saxophone on tracks 3, 7, 9
- Eric Crystal - saxophone on tracks 3, 6, 7, 8, 9
- Dave Ellis - baritone saxophone, tenor saxophone on tracks 3, 5
- Mickey Hart - percussion on tracks 1, 6, 7
- Matthew Kelly - harmonica on tracks 3, 8, 9
- Robbie Kwock - trumpet on tracks 3, 7, 8, 9
- Mike McGinn - guitar on tracks 1, 2, 6, 10
- Marty Wehner - trombone on tracks 3, 7, 8, 9

=== Production ===
- Executive producer - Bob Weir
- Producer - Mike McGinn and the Blotter Brothers
- Recording engineer - Mike McGinn
- Mixing - Tom Flye
- Additional engineers - Mike Freitas, Justin Phelps and Kris Ziakas
- Mastering - Joe Gastwirt
- Management - Cameron Sears, Sirius Management
- Publicity - Dennis McNally
- Crew - Mike McGinn, A.J. Santella and Kris Ziakas
- Package coordination - Cassidy Law
- Art direction and design - Geoff Gans
- Photography - Doug Menuez
