= Al Duncan =

American musucian (1927–1995)

Al Duncan (October 8, 1927, McKinney, Texas — January 3, 1995, Las Vegas) was an American drummer and songwriter. Music critic and musicologist Eugene Chadbourne described Duncan as a "forefather of rhythm and blues" and "one of less than a half dozen key studio legends of the 1950s and 1960s who have sometimes been called the 'grandfathers of groove'." Chadbourne credited Duncan as helping develop the characteristic metric feel or timekeeping of rhythm and blues. His work is featured on recordings with Roy Buchanan, Billy "The Kid" Emerson, Buddy Guy, Dale Hawkins, Red Holloway, Camille Howard, Horace Palm, Jimmy Reed, Phil Upchurch, and Rob Wasserman among others. Of the songs he penned, the best known is "It's Too Late, Brother" which has become a blues staple.
