= John Molo =

American musician (born 1953)

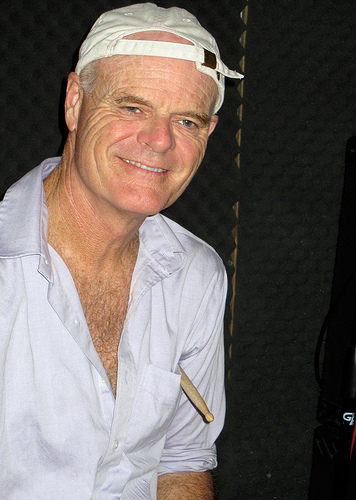
- John Molo in 2009.

Background information
- Born: December 5, 1953 (age 72); Bethesda, Maryland, U.S.
- Genres: Rock, jazz
- Occupation: Musician
- Instruments: Drums, percussion
- Labels: RCA Records, Columbia Records, Arista Records

John Molo (born December 5, 1953, Bethesda, Maryland) is an American rock and jazz drummer and percussionist. He has played with a variety of bands, combos, and soloists. Best known for being the drummer for Bruce Hornsby and the Range, he has also played with The Other Ones, Phil Lesh and Friends, Delaney Bramlett, John Fogerty, Keller Williams, Mike Watt, Paul Kelly, David Nelson, Jemimah Puddleduck, and Modereko.

== Biography ==
=== Early years ===
John Molo was born in Bethesda, Maryland of mostly Irish descent. His surname is Swiss-Italian but his other three grandparents all emigrated from Ireland. He was raised Catholic in Washington, D.C. His father was an oceanographer who became increasingly concerned about the safety of the inner city and, when Molo was 12, the family moved to suburban Virginia, where Molo attended Langley High School in nearby McLean, Virginia. While at Langley Molo played in the school's nationally renowned jazz ensemble, the Langley High Jazz Lab, under the direction of band director George Horan.

== Later career ==
Molo was the drummer for Bruce Hornsby and the Range when the band won the Grammy Award for Best New Artist of 1986. After the Range disbanded in 1990, Molo continued to collaborate and tour with Hornsby until 1998.

In May 2009, Molo joined the band Moonalice.

== Discography ==
- The Way It Is — Bruce Hornsby and the Range (1986)
- Scenes From the Southside — Bruce Hornsby and the Range (1988)
- A Night on the Town — Bruce Hornsby and the Range (1990)
- Harbor Lights — Bruce Hornsby (1993)
- Wanted Man — Paul Kelly (1994)
- Ball-Hog or Tugboat? — Mike Watt (1995)
- Hot House — Bruce Hornsby (1995)
- Spirit Trail — Bruce Hornsby (1998)
- The Strange Remain — The Other Ones (1999)
- Jemimah Puddleduck — Jemimah Puddleduck (2000)
- Modereko — Modereko (2001)
- Meisner, Swan & Rich — Meisner, Swan & Rich (2001)
- Trumpet Ride — Willie Waldman (2001)
- There and Back Again — Phil Lesh and Friends (2002)
- Solar Igniter — Modereko (2003)
- Intersections (1985-2005) — Bruce Hornsby (2006)
- The Long Road Home - In Concert — John Fogerty (2006)
- Live at the Warfield — Phil Lesh and Friends (2006)
- Dream — Keller Williams (2007)
- A New Kind Of Blues — Delaney Bramlett (2008)
- Walk Through the Fire — Mark Karan (2009)
- High 5 – Moonalice (2016)
- Full Moonalice Vol. 1 – Moonalice (2022)
- Full Moonalice Vol. 2 – Moonalice (2022)
- Light Side of the Moonalice: An Acoustic Adventure – Moonalice (2023)
