= Eudemonic =

Studio album by Steve Kimock Band
- Released: 2005
- Genre: Instrumental Rock
- Label: Sci Fidelity

Professional ratings
Review scores
| Source | Rating |
|---|---|
| Allmusic | 3.5/5 stars |

Eudemonic is a 2005 studio album by the Steve Kimock Band.

== Track listing ==
1. "Eudemon" – 6:28
2. "Ice Cream" – 8:01
3. "The Bronx Experiment" – 8:04
4. "Bouncer" – 4:15
5. "In Reply" – 5:56
6. "One for Brother Mike – 6:41
7. "Elmer's Revenge" – 11:57
8. "Moon People" – 6:34
9. "Tongue N' Groove" - 8:36
