= Fare Thee Well: Celebrating 50 Years of the Grateful Dead (album) =

2015 live album by the Grateful Dead

Fare Thee Well: Celebrating 50 Years of the Grateful Dead is a live album consisting of audio and video recordings from the Fare Thee Well: Celebrating 50 Years of the Grateful Dead concerts. These shows were performed by former Grateful Dead members Bob Weir, Phil Lesh, Bill Kreutzmann, and Mickey Hart, along with Trey Anastasio, Bruce Hornsby, and Jeff Chimenti. The album was recorded on July 3, 4, and 5, 2015, at Soldier Field in Chicago, Illinois. The other two Fare Thee Well concerts, played on June 27 and 28 at Levi's Stadium in Santa Clara, California are not included. The album was released on November 20, 2015.

== Versions ==
The album was released in three versions:

- Fare Thee Well: Complete Box Set, a 12-CD and seven-DVD or Blu-ray box set that includes the complete audio and video of all three Chicago concerts. This is a limited edition of 20,000 numbered copies, and includes a bonus disc of behind-the-scenes footage directed by Justin Kreutzmann, the son of drummer Bill Kreutzmann. This set also includes three CDs consisting of the intermission music from each concert, performed by the band Circles Around the Sun, led by guitarist Neal Casal. Known as Interludes for the Dead, this music also was released separately as a two-disc album on November 27, 2015.
- Fare Thee Well: July 5th 2015, a three-CD and two-DVD or Blu-ray album of the audio and video of the July 5 concert.
- The Best of Fare Thee Well, a two-CD album of audio selections from the three concerts.

== Fare Thee Well: Complete Box Set ==
Fare Thee Well: Complete Box Set
- Fare Thee Well: Complete Box Set

Live album
- Released: November 20, 2015
- Recorded: July 3–5, 2015
- Venue: Soldier Field, Chicago
- Genre: Rock
- Label: Rhino
- Producer: David Lemieux, Mark Pinkus

=== July 3, 2015 ===
Disc one

1. "Box of Rain" (Phil Lesh, Robert Hunter)
2. "Jack Straw" (Bob Weir, Hunter)
3. "Bertha" (Jerry Garcia, Hunter)
4. "Passenger" (Lesh, Peter Monk)
5. "The Wheel" (Garcia, Bill Kreutzmann, Hunter)
6. "Crazy Fingers" (Garcia, Hunter)
7. "The Music Never Stopped" (Weir, John Perry Barlow)

Disc two

1. "Mason's Children" (Garcia, Lesh, Weir, Hunter)
2. "Scarlet Begonias" (Garcia, Hunter)
3. "Fire on the Mountain" (Mickey Hart, Hunter)
4. "Drums" (Kreutzmann, Hart)
5. "Space" (Lesh, Weir, Hart, Trey Anastasio, Bruce Hornsby, Jeff Chimenti)

Disc three

1. "New Potato Caboose" (Lesh, Bobby Petersen)
2. "Playing in the Band" (Weir, Hunter)
3. "Jam" (Lesh, Weir, Kerutzmann, Hart, Anastasio, Hornsby, Chimenti)
4. "Let It Grow" (Weir, Barlow)
5. "Help on the Way" (Garcia, Hunter)
6. "Slipknot!" (Garcia, Weir, Lesh, Kreutzmann, Keith Godchaux)
7. "Franklin’s Tower" (Garcia, Kreutzmann, Hunter)
8. "Ripple" (Garcia, Hunter)

Disc four
Intermission music by Circles Around the Sun

1. "Space Wheel"
2. "Mountains of the Moon"
3. "Praying for the Band"
4. "Tripple"
5. "Deal Breaker"
6. "Deadometer"
7. "Borrow from a Friend"
8. "Grimes Surf Story"

=== July 4, 2015 ===
Disc five

1. "Shakedown Street" (Garcia, Hunter)
2. "Liberty" (Garcia, Hunter)
3. "Standing on the Moon" (Garcia, Hunter)
4. "Me and My Uncle" (John Phillips)
5. "Tennessee Jed" (Garcia, Hunter)
6. "Cumberland Blues" (Garcia, Lesh, Hunter)
7. "Little Red Rooster" (Willie Dixon)
8. "Friend of the Devil" (Garcia, John Dawson, Hunter)
9. "Deal" (Garcia, Hunter)

Disc six

1. "Bird Song" (Garcia, Hunter)
2. "The Golden Road (To Unlimited Devotion)" (Garcia, Lesh, Weir, Kreutzmann, Ron "Pigpen" McKernan)
3. "Lost Sailor" (Weir, Barlow)
4. "Saint of Circumstance" (Weir, Barlow)
5. "West L.A. Fadeaway" (Garcia, Hunter)

Disc seven

1. "Foolish Heart" (Garcia, Hunter)
2. "Drums" (Kreutzmann, Hart)
3. "Space" (Lesh, Weir, Hart, Anastasio, Hornsby, Chimenti)
4. "Stella Blue" (Garcia, Hunter)
5. "One More Saturday Night" (Weir)
6. "U.S. Blues" (Garcia, Hunter)

Disc eight
Intermission music by Circles Around the Sun

1. "Hallucinate a Solution"
2. "Ginger Says"
3. "Saturday's Children"
4. "Eartha"
5. "Split Pea Shell"

=== July 5, 2015 ===
Disc nine

1. "China Cat Sunflower" (Garcia, Hunter)
2. "I Know You Rider" (trad. arr. Grateful Dead)
3. "Estimated Prophet" (Weir, Barlow)
4. "Built to Last" (Garcia, Hunter)
5. "Samson and Delilah" (trad. arr. Grateful Dead)
6. "Mountains of the Moon" (Garcia, Hunter)
7. "Throwing Stones" (Weir, Barlow)

Disc Ten

1. "Truckin' " (Garcia, Lesh, Weir, Hunter)
2. "Cassidy" (Weir, Barlow)
3. "Althea" (Garcia, Hunter)
4. "Terrapin Station" (Garcia, Kreutzmann, Hart, Hunter)
5. "Drums" (Kreutzmann, Hart)

Disc eleven

1. "Space" (Lesh, Weir, Hart, Anastasio, Hornsby, Chimenti)
2. "Unbroken Chain" (Lesh, Peterson)
3. "Days Between" (Garcia, Hunter)
4. "Not Fade Away" (Charles Hardin, Norman Petty)
5. "Touch of Grey" (Garcia, Hunter)
6. "Attics of My Life" (Garcia, Hunter)

Disc twelve
Intermission music by Circles Around the Sun

1. "Gilbert’s Groove"
2. "Farewell Franklins"
3. "Hat and Cane"
4. "Never Too Late"
5. "Scarlotta's Magnolias"

== Fare Thee Well: July 5th 2015 ==
Fare Thee Well: July 5th 2015
- Fare Thee Well: July 5th 2015

Live album
- Released: November 20, 2015
- Recorded: July 5, 2015
- Venue: Soldier Field, Chicago
- Genre: Rock
- Label: Rhino
- Producer: David Lemieux, Mark Pinkus

Disc one

1. "China Cat Sunflower" (Garcia, Hunter)
2. "I Know You Rider" (trad. arr. Grateful Dead)
3. "Estimated Prophet" (Weir, Barlow)
4. "Built to Last" (Garcia, Hunter)
5. "Samson and Delilah" (trad. arr. Grateful Dead)
6. "Mountains of the Moon" (Garcia, Hunter)
7. "Throwing Stones" (Weir, Barlow)

Disc two

1. "Truckin'" (Garcia, Lesh, Weir, Hunter)
2. "Cassidy" (Weir, Barlow)
3. "Althea" (Garcia, Hunter)
4. "Terrapin Station" (Garcia, Kreutzmann, Hart, Hunter)
5. "Drums" (Kreutzmann, Hart)

Disc three

1. "Space" (Lesh, Weir, Hart, Anastasio, Hornsby, Chimenti)
2. "Unbroken Chain" (Lesh, Peterson)
3. "Days Between" (Garcia, Hunter)
4. "Not Fade Away" (Hardin, Petty)
5. "Touch of Grey" (Garcia, Hunter)
6. "Attics of My Life" (Garcia, Hunter)

== The Best of Fare Thee Well ==
The Best of Fare Thee Well
- The Best of Fare Thee Well

Live album
- Released: November 20, 2015
- Recorded: July 3–5, 2015
- Venue: Soldier Field, Chicago
- Genre: Rock
- Label: Rhino
- Producer: David Lemieux, Mark Pinkus

Disc one

1. "Box of Rain" (Lesh, Hunter) – July 3 – 5:27
2. "Shakedown Street" (Garcia, Hunter) – July 4 – 15:23
3. "China Cat Sunflower" (Garcia, Hunter) – July 5 – 7:18
4. "I Know You Rider" (trad. arr. Grateful Dead) – July 5 – 7:25
5. "Bertha" (Garcia, Hunter) – July 3 – 7:49
6. "West L.A. Fadeaway" (Garcia, Hunter) – July 4 – 10:16
7. "Cumberland Blues" (Garcia, Lesh, Hunter) – July 4 – 7:05
8. "Althea" (Garcia, Hunter) – July 5 – 7:56
9. "The Music Never Stopped" (Weir, Barlow) – July 3 – 10:12

Disc two

1. "Truckin'" (Garcia, Lesh, Weir, Hunter) – July 5 – 14:00
2. "Scarlet Begonias" (Garcia, Hunter) – July 3 – 11:36
3. "Fire on the Mountain" (Hart, Hunter) – July 3 – 6:37
4. "Drums" (Kreutzmann, Hart) – July 5 – 15:35
5. "Not Fade Away" (Hardin, Petty) – July 5 – 13:50
6. "Touch of Grey" (Garcia, Hunter) – July 5 – 8:36
7. "Attics of My Life" (Garcia, Hunter) – July 5 – 6:41

== Personnel ==
Musicians

- Mickey Hart – drums, percussion
- Bill Kreutzmann – drums, percussion
- Phil Lesh – bass, vocals
- Bob Weir – guitar, vocals
- Trey Anastasio – guitar, vocals
- Jeff Chimenti – keyboards, vocals
- Bruce Hornsby – piano, vocals

Circles Around the Sun – Interludes for the Dead (box set discs 4, 8 and 12)

- Neal Casal – guitar
- Adam MacDougall – keyboards
- Dan Horne – bass
- Mark Levy – drums

Production

- David Lemieux – producer
- Mark Pinkus – producer
- Doran Tyson – associate producer
- Susanne Savage – associate producer
- Ivette Ramos – associate producer
- Matt Busch – executive producer
- Jill Lesh – executive producer
- Nate Parienti – executive producer
- Peter Shapiro – executive producer
- Dennis "Wiz" Leonard – recording, mixing
- Joel Singer – recording
- Derek Featherstone – mixing
- Jeffrey Norman – mastering
- Christopher Capotosto – illustration
- Chris Kovach – art direction
- Jay Blakesberg – photos
- Chad Smith – photos
- Katherine Delaney – package design
- Shannon Ward – package supervision
- Jesse Jarnow – liner notes
- J.P. Hesser – recording (Interludes for the Dead)
