= Greg Anton =

Recording artist

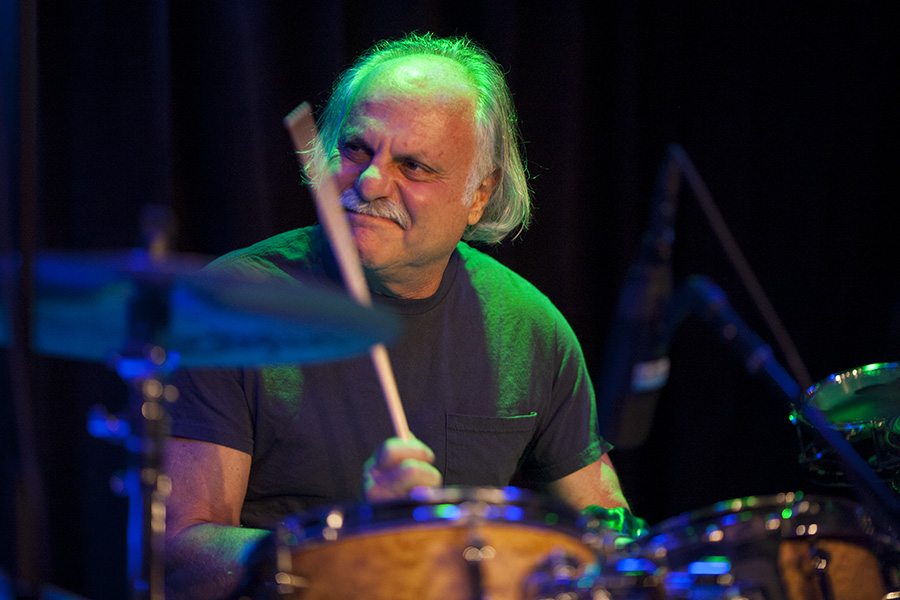
- Greg Anton

Background information
- Born: August 8, 1949 (age 76); Hartford, Connecticut, USA
- Genres: Rock, psychedelic, instrumental
- Occupations: Musician, composer, author, attorney
- Instruments: Drums, piano, percussion
- Years active: 1967–present
- Labels: A&M, Pop Mafia/Warner Bros., Mobile Fidelity, Taxim, Relix Records
- Website: gregantonmusic.com gregantonlaw.com

Greg Anton is a drummer, composer and co-founding member, with guitarist Steve Kimock, of the band Zero. Greg is also a writer and practicing attorney.

== Biography ==
Greg was born in Hartford, Connecticut (August 8, 1949). His mother Shirley was a sculptor/painter, his father Paul, a college professor. Greg has five children and lives with his wife Holly Anton in Sonoma County, California.

== Education ==
Greg received a BA with honors in philosophy from Ohio University in 1971. His undergraduate thesis: "A Phenomenological Analysis of Music", was published by Ohio University Press. He continued studying philosophy in a Masters program at San Francisco State University, then went on to receive his Juris Doctor degree at the Seattle University School of Law (formerly the University of Puget Sound Law School).

== Literary career ==
Greg's first novel, "Face the Music", was published on December 1, 2014 by Plus One Press.

The novel "Face the Music" is a fictional story about a love song called "Stephanie". In 2014 Greg composed a song by the same name with Grateful Dead lyricist Robert Hunter and recorded it with Steve Kimock, Melvin Seals, Tim Hockenberry and Robin Sylvester.

== Music career ==
Greg has performed on numerous recordings and at thousands of concerts worldwide. He has played most extensively with his band Zero, which has released eight albums and performed over 1300 concerts. Greg began playing drums at age 11. At age 13, due to an accident, he suffered a traumatic amputation of his left hand. Using a prosthetic device, he continued playing drums and began performing professionally while in high school. He's published more than 50 original songs, many of which were co-written with Grateful Dead lyricist Robert Hunter. Greg has also composed music for film, TV and theater. Among others, Greg has performed or recorded with John Cipollina (Quicksilver Messenger Service), John Lee Hooker, Stanley Jordan, Otis Taylor, Nicky Hopkins (Rolling Stones) and members of the Grateful Dead. He currently tours with The Rock Collection, featuring Melvin Seals (Jerry Garcia Band), Dan "Lebo" Lebowitz (ALO), Stu Allen (JGB, Phil Lesh and Friends), and Robin Sylvester (Bob Weir's Ratdog).

== Legal career ==
Greg was admitted to the California State Bar in 1977. As an attorney, he has been a champion of medical marijuana rights, challenging prohibition laws in state courts, the Ninth Circuit Federal Court of Appeals and the US Supreme Court (Cert. Denied).
