= Walk Through the Fire (album) =

Studio album by Mark Karan
- Released: June 30, 2009
- Genre: Rock
- Length: 68:05
- Labels: Quacktone, DIG Music
- Producer: Mark Karan

Professional ratings
Review scores
Source	Rating
The Best of Website	(favorable)
Green Man Review	(favorable)
KindWeb	(favorable)
Marin Independent Journal	(favorable)
Swampland	(favorable)

Walk Through the Fire is the debut album by guitarist Mark Karan. It features several originals as well as covers and Karan is backed by many different musicians, including his band Jemimah Puddleduck and the Persuasions for some songs. It also includes a posthumous contribution from Delaney Bramlett. The album was released in stores on June 30, 2009, but some of it was available for streaming on Karan's website before then.

== Track listing ==
1. "Annie Don't Lie" (Alex Call) – 4:49
2. "Leave a Light On" (Mark Karan) – 6:49
3. "Bait the Hook" (Karan) – 4:20
4. "Walk Through the Fire" (Karan) – 4:13
5. "Love in Vain" (Robert Johnson) – 5:25
6. "Rock Your Papa" (Karan) – 4:59
7. "Memphis Radio" (Susan Sheller) – 6:00
8. "Time Will Tell" (Karan) – 8:49
9. "Love Song" (Karan) – 4:08
10. "Think It's Gonna Rain" (Randy Newman) – 4:50
11. "Fools In Love" (Joe Jackson) – 6:59
12. "Easy Wind" (Robert Hunter) – 6:44

== Personnel ==
- Mark Karan - guitar, vocals
- John Molo - drums (tracks 1,2,3,5,6,8, 10, 11 and 12)
- Wally Ingram - percussion (tracks 2, 4, 7, 9, 11 and 12)
- Jimmy Sanchez - drums (tracks 4, 7 and 9)
- JT Thomas - keyboards (tracks 1,2,3,4,7, 8, 10, 11 and 12)
- Mike Finnigan - keyboards (tracks 6 and 9)
- Pete Sears - keyboards (track 5)
- Bill Payne - keyboards (track 6)
- James "Hutch" Hutchinson - bass (tracks 2, 4, 5, 6, 7, 8, 9 and 12)
- Bob Gross - bass (tracks 1, 3, 10 and 11)
- Glenn Hartman - accordion (tracks 1 and 6)
- Jackie LaBranch - vocals (tracks 3, 7, 9 and 11)
- Gloria Jones - vocals (tracks 3, 7, 9 and 11)
- Amber Morris - vocals (tracks 9 and 11)
- April Grisman - vocals (tracks 9 and 11)
- Joe Russell - vocals (tracks 1 and 6)
- Ray Sanders - vocals (tracks 1 and 6)
- Jayotis Washington - vocals (tracks 1 and 6)
- Reggie Moore - vocals (tracks 1 and 6)
- Jimmy Hayes - vocals (tracks 1 and 6)
- Peter Rowan - guitar, vocals (track 2)
- Chris Rowan - guitar, vocals (track 2)
- Lorin Rowan - guitar, vocals (track 2)
- Delaney Bramlett - guitar, vocals (track 5)
