= Live at Roseland =

2001 live album by RatDog with Bob Weir

Live album by RatDog
- Released: July 2001
- Recorded: April 25–26, 2001
- Genre: Rock
- Length: 146:09
- Label: Grateful Dead Records

Bob Weir chronology
Evening Moods (2000)	Live at Roseland (2001)	Weir Here – The Best of Bob Weir (2004)

Live at Roseland is a 2001 live album by the band RatDog, featuring former Grateful Dead guitarist and singer Bob Weir. In contrast to studio album Evening Moods, this release contains mostly songs from the Grateful Dead song book. It was recorded at the Roseland Theater in Portland, Oregon, on April 25 and 26, 2001.

The song "Ashes and Glass" contains an instrumental excerpt of Grateful Dead's well-known jam classic "Dark Star".

== Reception ==
Professional ratings
Review scores
Source	Rating
AllMusic	4/5 stars
Jambands: The Complete Guide to the Players, Music, & Scene	3.5/5 stars
The Virgin Encyclopedia of Jazz	3/5 stars

In a review for AllMusic, William Ruhlmann wrote: "RatDog comes off as a Grateful Dead clone band with the Dead's surviving co-lead vocalist at the helm... In addition to the repertoire, there is the overall musical style of the band, which, despite the presence of a saxophone, has a very Dead-like feel. Add it up, and this is music Deadheads will welcome."

Author Dean Budnick stated that, despite the presence of some "agreeable interpretations" of Dead material, "the release fails to deliver on the band's full resources."

== Track listing ==
=== Disc one ===
1. "The Music Never Stopped" (John Perry Barlow, Bob Weir) – 10:25
2. "New Minglewood Blues" (trad., arr. Weir) – 8:55
3. "Loser" (Robert Hunter, Jerry Garcia) – 9:43
4. "Friend of the Devil" (John Dawson, Hunter, Garcia) – 5:22
5. "Corrina" (Hunter, Weir) – 10:09
6. "Bird Song" (Hunter, Garcia) – 12:08
7. "Ashes and Glass" (André Pessis, Weir, Jeff Chimenti, Dave Ellis, Mark Karan, Jay Lane, Mike McGinn, Rob Wasserman) – 14:13

=== Disc two ===
1. "Estimated Prophet" (Barlow, Weir) – 14:20
2. "Bass/Drums" (Wasserman, Lane) – 6:13
3. "Mission in the Rain" (Hunter, Garcia) – 8:21
4. "Even So" (Gerrit Graham, Weir, Chimenti, Ellis, Karan, Matthew Kelly, Lane, McGinn, Wasserman) – 8:52
5. "Tennessee Jed" (Hunter, Garcia) – 8:44
6. "The Other One" (Bill Kreutzmann, Weir) – 8:57
7. "Bird Song" (Hunter, Garcia) – 8:45
8. "Turn On Your Love Light" (Deadric Malone, Joseph Scott) – 10:56

== Recording dates ==
- April 25, 2001 - Disc 1 tracks 1–3 & 6, Disc 2 tracks 4–7
- April 26, 2001 - Disc 1 tracks 4–5 & 7, Disc 2 tracks 1–3 & 8

== Credits ==
=== RatDog ===
- Kenny Brooks – saxophone
- Jeff Chimenti – background vocals, keyboards
- Mark Karan – background vocals, lead guitar
- Jay Lane – background vocals, drums
- Rob Wasserman – double bass
- Bob Weir – guitar, vocals

=== Production ===
- FOH engineer, recording & mixing – Michael McGinn
- Assistant recording engineer – Jose Neves
- Assistant mix engineer – Mike Frietas
- Mastering engineer – Kris Ziakis
- Monitor engineer – Chris Charucki
- Cover art & layout design – Gary Houston, Kevin Hutton
- Photography – Susana Millman, Stephen Dorian Miner
- Album coordination – Cassidy Law
