= Heart of Gold Band =

Band

- Origin: San Francisco, California
- Genres: Rock
- Years active: 1980–1981, 2004, 2016
- Label: Heart of Gold
- Members: Steve Kimock; Greg Anton; David MacKay; Mookie Siegel
- Past members: Donna Jean Godchaux; Keith Godchaux; Dexter LaBlanc; Greta Rose; Zion Godchaux; Brian Godchaux; Kinsman MacKay; Mark Adler; Russ Randolf
- Website: www.heartofgoldband.com

The Heart of Gold Band was an American rock band formed by Keith and Donna Jean Godchaux in 1980 following their departure from the Grateful Dead. The band took its name from a line in the Dead song "Scarlet Begonias".

== Original Run ==
The Heart of Gold Band was formed in early 1980, shortly after Keith and Donna Godchaux had left the Grateful Dead in 1979. Other founding members of the group were guitarist Steve Kimock, drummer Greg Anton, bassist Dexter LaBlanc, and vocalist Greta Rose. Keith Godchaux was killed in a car accident on July 23, 1980, just a few days after the band's first gig. The band continued on for another year, adding keyboardist Mark Adler and replacing Dexter LaBlanc with Donna Godchaux's future husband, David MacKay, before disbanding.

A self-titled CD was released in 1998, containing 13 tracks recorded by the original band, 11 of them prior to Keith Godchaux's death.

== Reformation ==
The band was reformed in 2004 when Donna Godchaux and her husband, David MacKay, were looking to form a band. They originally intended to call the group "Godchaux MacKay", but drummer Greg Anton got involved and the group was named the Heart of Gold Band. Also involved in the reconfigured group are former keyboardist Mark Adler, percussionist Russ Randolf, Keith and Donna's son Zion Godchaux, Keith's brother Brian Godchaux, and Kinsman MacKay, the son of Donna and David MacKay. The reunited band released At The Table in 2004 on their own Heart of Gold Records.

The group has largely been on hiatus since its reformation in 2004. For a while Donna Jean Godchaux-MacKay performed with the Donna Jean Godchaux Band.

On August 1, 2016 in celebration of Jerry Garcia's birthday the band reunited for a performance at Sweetwater Music Hall in Mill Valley, CA. Donna Jean Godchaux Mackay, Steve Kimock, Greg Anton, David Mackay, Mookie Siegel and Brian Godchaux were joined for several songs by Donna's former Grateful Dead bandmate, Bob Weir. A high fidelity multi-track recording of the entire concert was published in April 2017.
