= Fiddleworms =

American rock music group

- Origin: United States
- Genres: Rock, Southern rock, jam
- Years active: 1994 – present
- Members: Russell Mefford; David MacKay; Rob Malone; Clint Bailey; John Tombyll
- Past members: Chris Quillen; Scott Kennedy; Chalmers Davis; Mike Roberts; Matt Ross
- Website: www.fiddleworms.com

Fiddleworms is an American rock music group from Muscle Shoals, Alabama. The band was originally formed in 1994 by Russell Mefford, Chris Quillen, Scott Kennedy, and Matt Ross. Later, Rob Malone (formerly of the Drive-By Truckers), David MacKay (husband of Donna Jean Godchaux-MacKay formerly of the Grateful Dead and who appeared in the first Grammy-winning video, Elephant Parts), Mitch Mann, Clint Bailey and Daniel Ledford, would join the band.

The band's latest release is See The Light 2012.

== History ==
The band known as Fiddleworms was formed in 1994 and is signed with Heart of Gold Records. The band name is based on folklore from the Muscle Shoals area called "fiddling for worms" in which a young tree sapling by the river is split and a saw is run over it. The vibrations from the saw are said to cause large earthworms to come to the top of the mud, which are called "fiddleworms."

== Music ==
Fiddleworms play a wide array of original songs as well as several covers. Their music includes elements of original and traditional rock, southern alternative, jazz, reggae and folk They are featured each year as a regular act at the W. C. Handy Music Festival.

== Discography ==
- Yellowhammer (1996)
- Year of The Cock (2005)
- Live Bait (2007)
- Volkswagen Catfish (2008)
- See the Light (2012)
- Perfect Storm (Live At The NuttHouse) (2015)
- Southern Belle (2020)
