= The Other Ones =

American rock band (1998–2002)

- Origin: San Francisco, California, United States
- Genres: Rock; jazz rock; psychedelic rock; roots rock; jam band
- Years active: 1998–2002
- Label: Arista
- Spinoffs: The Dead
- Spinoff of: Grateful Dead
- Past members: Bob Weir; Mickey Hart; Bruce Hornsby; Mark Karan; Steve Kimock; Phil Lesh; John Molo; Dave Ellis; Bill Kreutzmann; Alphonso Johnson; Jimmy Herring; Rob Barraco; Jeff Chimenti; Susan Tedeschi
- Website: www.dead.net

The Other Ones was an American rock band formed in 1998 by former Grateful Dead members Bob Weir, Phil Lesh, and Mickey Hart, along with part-time Grateful Dead collaborator Bruce Hornsby. In 2000, Bill Kreutzmann, another Grateful Dead alumnus, joined the group, while Phil Lesh dropped out. In 2002, Lesh rejoined the band, and Hornsby left. At different times the shifting lineup of the Other Ones also included Mark Karan, Steve Kimock, John Molo, Dave Ellis, Alphonso Johnson, Jimmy Herring, Rob Barraco, Jeff Chimenti, and Susan Tedeschi. In 2003, the Other Ones changed their name to The Dead.

The Other Ones continued the musical legacy of the Grateful Dead after Jerry Garcia died in 1995, playing many Grateful Dead songs and utilizing a similar jam band style that emphasized musical improvisation. The name of the band was taken from the title of the Grateful Dead song "That's It for the Other One", from 1968's Anthem of the Sun.

In 1999, the Other Ones released The Strange Remain, a two-disc CD recorded live during their 1998 Furthur Festival tour.

To celebrate the release of the album, on February 8, 1999, the Other Ones performed a live webcast (the first for members of the Grateful Dead), from Herbie Herbert's Sy Klopps Studios in San Francisco. The event, produced by Chime Interactive (then named Evolve Internet Solutions), featured a live conversation with online fans moderated by Steve Silberman with band members Bob Weir, Mickey Hart, Mark Karan and Dave Ellis. The event began with a live performance of "Friend of the Devil", the first time members of the Grateful Dead participated in live streaming.

== Personnel ==
1998	Bob Weir – guitar, vocals; Phil Lesh – bass, vocals; Mickey Hart – drums, vocals; Bruce Hornsby – keyboards, vocals; Mark Karan – guitar, vocals; Steve Kimock – guitar; John Molo – drums; Dave Ellis – saxophone, vocals
2000	Bob Weir – guitar, vocals; Mickey Hart – drums, vocals; Bill Kreutzmann – drums; Bruce Hornsby – keyboards, vocals; Mark Karan – guitar, vocals; Steve Kimock – guitar; Alphonso Johnson – bass
2002	Bob Weir – guitar, vocals; Phil Lesh – bass, vocals; Mickey Hart – drums, vocals; Bill Kreutzmann – drums; Jimmy Herring – guitar; Rob Barraco – keyboards, vocals; Jeff Chimenti – keyboards, vocals; Susan Tedeschi – vocals
