= Heart of Gold Records =

- Origin: United States
- Website: http://www.heartofgoldband.com

Heart of Gold Records is an American independent record label, established in Florence, Alabama.

Artists who have released material on Heart of Gold include The Heart of Gold Band, Donna Jean Godchaux-Mackay, BoomBox, and Fiddleworms.

Heart of Gold Records is active in the Muscle Shoals, Alabama music and arts community.

== See also ==
- List of record labels
