= Rob Wasserman =

American composer and bassist (1952–2016)

- Born: April 1, 1952; San Mateo, California, U.S.
- Died: June 29, 2016 (aged 64) Los Angeles, California, U.S.
- Genres: Rock, jazz, folk
- Occupation: Musician
- Instrument: Double bass
- Formerly of: RatDog

Rob Wasserman (April 1, 1952 – June 29, 2016) was an American composer and bass player. A Grammy Award and NEA grant winner, he played and recorded with a wide variety of musicians including Bob Weir, Bruce Cockburn, Elvis Costello, Ani di Franco, Jerry Garcia, David Grisman, Stéphane Grappelli, Rickie Lee Jones, Van Morrison, Steve Morse, Aaron Neville, Lou Reed, Pete Seeger, Jules Shear, Brian Wilson, Chris Whitley, Neil Young, Jackson Browne, Laurie Anderson, Stephen Perkins, Banyan, Mystic Knights of the Oingo Boingo, and Ratdog.

He is best known for his own work on the trilogy of albums, Solo, Duets, and Trios.

== Life and career ==
Wasserman started playing violin, and graduated to the bass after his teenage years. He studied at the San Francisco Conservatory of Music where he studied composing with John Adams and double bass with San Francisco Symphony bassists.

He worked with Van Morrison, Oingo Boingo, and David Grisman. His 1983 album Solo won Down Beat magazine's Record of the Year award. On the albums Duets and Trios, he worked with Bobby McFerrin, Rickie Lee Jones, Cheryl Bentyne, Lou Reed, Stéphane Grappelli, Jerry Garcia, Brian Wilson, Willie Dixon, Branford Marsalis, Bob Weir, Edie Brickell, Les Claypool, Neil Young, and Elvis Costello.

Duets was nominated for three Grammy Awards. Bobby McFerrin won for "Brothers", which was performed with Wasserman. Wasserman also won Holland's Edison Award for Record of the Year.

His 2000 album, Space Island, incorporated more contemporary musical elements. RatDog, which he co-founded with Bob Weir from the Grateful Dead, occupied much of his time. He toured extensively with Lou Reed.

Wasserman was a judge for the 6th–10th annual Independent Music Awards.

Wasserman died of cancer on June 29, 2016, at age 64. He was remembered by KQED as "the Grammy-winning bassist whose playing accompanied everyone from Van Morrison to Willie Dixon." He was interred in Salem Memorial Park and Garden in Colma, California.

== Discography ==
=== As leader ===
- Solo (Rounder, 1983)
- Duets (MCA, 1988)
- Trios (GRP, 1994)
- Space Island (Atlantic, 2000)
- Cosmic Farm (Tone Center, 2005)

=== As co-leader ===
- Live, with Bob Weir (1999)
- Fall 1989: The Long Island Sound, with Bob Weir and Jerry Garcia Band (2013)
- Dua, with Sultan Khan (2001)

=== As sideman ===
With David Grisman

- Quintet '80 1980
- Stephane Grappelli/David Grisman Live with Stéphane Grappelli (1981)
- Mondo Mando (1981)

With Lou Reed

- New York (1989)
- Magic and Loss (1992)
- Lulu with Metallica (2011)

With Rickie Lee Jones

- Flying Cowboys (1989)
- Naked Songs – Live and Acoustic (1995)

With others

- Beautiful Vision, Van Morrison (1982)
- Mighty Like a Rose, Elvis Costello (1991)
- The Original Wang Dang Doodle, Willie Dixon (1995)
- The Charity of Night, Bruce Cockburn (1996)
- Evening Moods, RatDog (2000)
- Live at Roseland, RatDog (2001)
- Summertime, Nineteen Thirteen (2015)
