= RatDog =

American rock band (1995–2014)

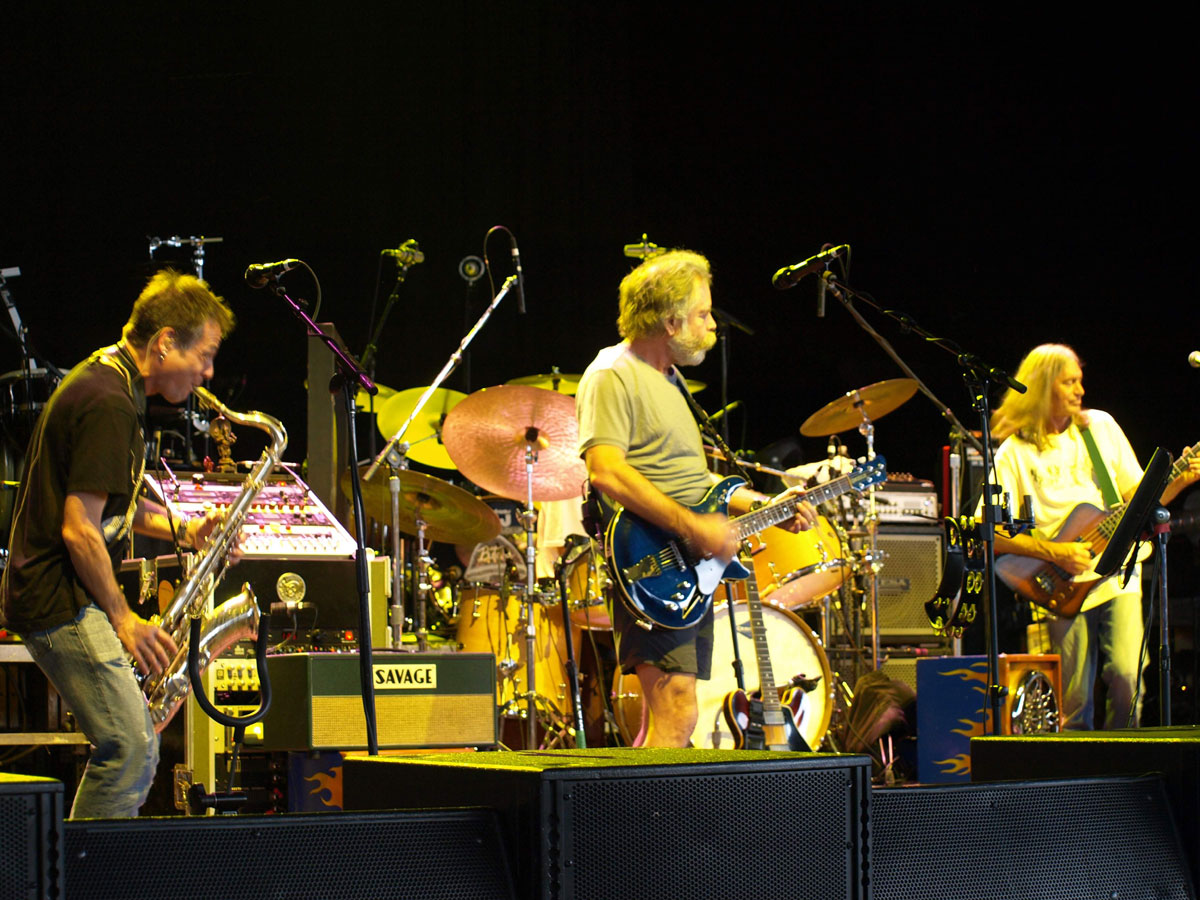
- RatDog performing in 2009

Background information
- Also known as: Bob Weir and RatDog, The Ratdog Revue
- Origin: San Francisco, California, U.S.
- Genres: Rock
- Years active: 1995–2014
- Label: Grateful Dead
- Past members: Bob Weir; Rob Wasserman; Jay Lane; Matthew Kelly; Vince Welnick; Johnnie Johnson; Dave Ellis; Mookie Siegel; Jeff Chimenti; Dave McNabb; Mark Karan; Kenny Brooks; Robin Sylvester; Steve Kimock
- Website: ratdog.org

RatDog was an American rock band. The group began in 1995 as a side project for Grateful Dead guitarist and singer Bob Weir. After the Dead disbanded later that year, RatDog became Weir's primary band. They performed some Grateful Dead songs, a mixture of covers (including Bob Dylan and Chuck Berry tunes), and some originals. They released two albums – Evening Moods (2000) and Live at Roseland (2001). RatDog last toured in July 2014. Weir died in January 2026.

The lineup of RatDog evolved over time. Musicians who were members of the band at different times include Rob Wasserman and Robin Sylvester on bass, Jay Lane on drums, Matthew Kelly, Mark Karan, and Steve Kimock on guitar, and Vince Welnick, Johnny Johnson and Jeff Chimenti on keyboards.

== History ==
During the late 1980s, Bob Weir teamed up with bassist Rob Wasserman and the duo toured for seven years under names including Weir/Wasserman and Scaring the Children. In 1994, Weir and Wasserman participated in the Woodstock '94 festival. Jay Lane was added on drums and Matthew Kelly on guitar and harmonica in 1995. They played their first show as a full band on April 22, 1995, billed as Friends of Montezuma and then as RatDog Revue. They played their first show as RatDog on August 8, 1995. Grateful Dead guitarist Jerry Garcia died the next day.

RatDog went through a series of personnel changes from 1995 and 2000. Former Grateful Dead keyboardist Vince Welnick performed with the group in late 1995. Former Chuck Berry collaborator Johnnie Johnson performed with the group from February 1996 to May 1997 and was then replaced by Jeff Chimenti who has been with the band ever since. Keyboardist Mookie Siegel also played with the band between 1996 and 1997. Saxophonist Dave Ellis was a member of the group from 1996 until 1999 when he was replaced by Kenny Brooks in 2000 until his departure in 2012. Mark Karan joined on guitar in 1998 until his departure in 2012. Original stand up bassist Rob Wasserman was replaced by bass guitarist Robin Sylvester in 2003. Wasserman rejoined the band in January 2012 and played alongside Sylvester until the former's death in June 2016. The lineup of Bob Weir (rhythm guitar, lead vocals), Jay Lane (drums, vocals), Jeff Chimenti (keyboards, vocals), Kenny Brooks (saxophone, vocals), Mark Karan (lead guitar, vocals) and Robin Sylvester (bass guitar, vocals) was the longest serving lineup of the band. They performed together for nine years from 2003 until 2012, with the exception of 2007 when Karan was replaced briefly by Steve Kimock to battle a health problem.

RatDog released their first and, to date, only studio album, Evening Moods in 2000. They released their only official live album Live at Roseland in 2001, although most of the soundboards from their concerts since the mid-2000s were made available for purchase after concerts and online.

Throughout 2009 and 2010, original RatDog members Weir, Wasserman and Lane periodically performed under the moniker Scaring the Children.

From 2010 through 2013, the number of RatDog's performances were limited while Weir toured with Furthur. Ratdog played two shows in both January 2012 and August 2013. In September 2013 it was revealed by Primus bassist Les Claypool that RatDog would be "getting back together this next year", as Lane had chosen to leave Primus in order to rejoin RatDog.

In February and March 2014, RatDog resumed more extensive touring, with Steve Kimock on lead guitar, Jeff Chimenti on keyboards, Jay Lane on drums, and two bass players, Robin Sylvester and Rob Wasserman. On August 10, 2014, Bob Weir and RatDog cancelled their summer and fall tour dates without explanation.

Original, and then-current, bassist Rob Wasserman died on June 29, 2016. On August 31, 2016, Weir reunited Ratdog for a special tribute to Wasserman, at the Sweetwater Music Hall in Mill Valley, California. Weir welcomed a number of guests to his show, including Steve Kimock, Mark Karan, Dave Ellis, Robin Sylvester, Jeff Chimenti and Jay Lane – all of whom were former and/or present members of RatDog. The band also welcomed Lukas Nelson and DJ Logic, who each sat in with the RatDog ensemble.The event marked the first time that guitarist Mark Karan and saxophonist Dave Ellis had played together in years. Both Karan and Ellis joined RatDog in the late 1990s, with Ellis leaving in 1999 and Karan staying on until 2012.

Founder and lead member Bob Weir died in January 2026.

== Notable guests ==
Since its formation, many guest musicians performed with RatDog, including Grateful Dead members Mickey Hart, Bill Kreutzmann, Donna Jean Godchaux and Bruce Hornsby. Other well known guests included Joan Baez, Warren Haynes, Jimmy Herring, Derek Trucks, Al Schnier, Ekoostik Hookah, Trey Anastasio, Les Claypool, Pete Sears, DJ Logic, John Popper, Dickey Betts, Sammy Hagar, Mike Gordon and Keller Williams.

== Band members ==
- Bob Weir – guitar, vocals (April 1995–July 2014; died 2026)
- Rob Wasserman – stand up bass (April 1995 – October 2002, January 2012 – July 2014; died 2016)
- Jay Lane – drums, backing vocals (April 1995–July 2014)
- Matthew Kelly – guitar, harmonica, backing vocals (April 1995 – September 1998)
- Vince Welnick – keyboards, backing vocals (September 1995 – December 1995; died 2006)
- Johnnie Johnson – keyboards (February 1996 – May 1997; died 2005)
- Dave Ellis – saxophone (November 1996 – December 1999)
- Mookie Siegel – keyboards (December 1996 – April 1997)
- Jeff Chimenti – keyboards, backing vocals (May 1997–July 2014)
- Dave McNabb – guitar (September 1998)
- Mark Karan – guitar, backing vocals (October 1998 – June 2007, May 2008 – January 2012)
- Kenny Brooks – saxophone (May 2000 – January 2012)
- Robin Sylvester – bass guitar, stand up bass (March 2003–July 2014; died 2022)
- Steve Kimock – guitar (July 2007 – April 2008, Aug 2013–July 2014)

=== Lineups ===
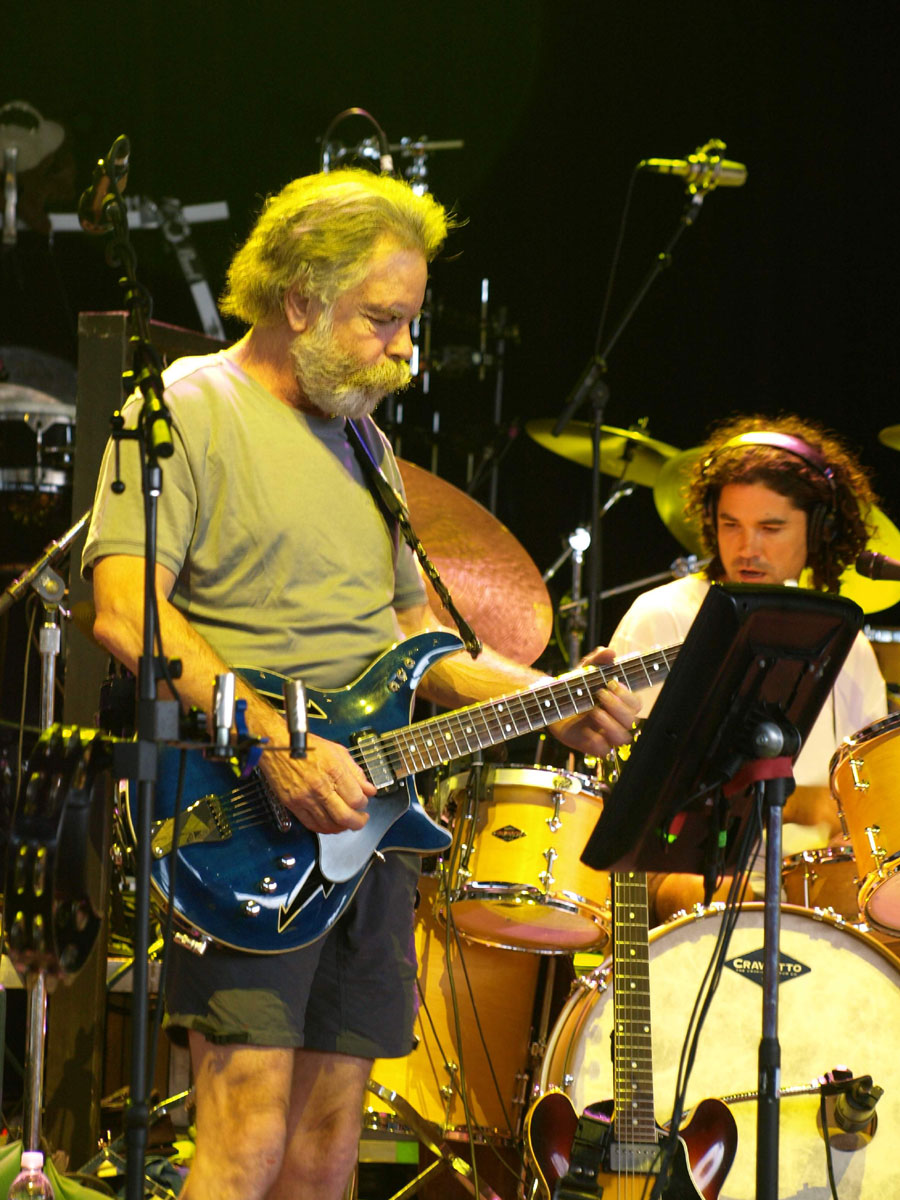
Bob Weir and Jay Lane performing with RatDog in April 2009.

Dates	Lineup
04/22/1995 – 08/25/1995	Bob Weir – guitar, vocals; Jay Lane – drums; Rob Wasserman – bass; Matthew Kelly – guitar, harmonica, vocals
09/01/1995 – 12/12/1995	Bob Weir – guitar, vocals; Jay Lane – drums; Rob Wasserman – bass; Matthew Kelly – guitar, harmonica, vocals; Vince Welnick – keyboards, vocals
02/20/1996 – 10/20/1996	Bob Weir – guitar, vocals; Jay Lane – drums; Rob Wasserman – bass; Matthew Kelly – guitar, harmonica, vocals; Johnnie Johnson – keyboards
11/09/1996 – 12/08/1996	Bob Weir – guitar, vocals; Jay Lane – drums; Rob Wasserman – bass; Matthew Kelly – guitar, harmonica, vocals; Johnnie Johnson – keyboards; Dave Ellis – saxophone
12/10/1996 – 04/15/1997	Bob Weir – guitar, vocals; Jay Lane – drums; Rob Wasserman – bass; Matthew Kelly – guitar, harmonica, vocals; Johnnie Johnson – keyboards; Dave Ellis – saxophone; Mookie Siegel – keyboards
05/28/1997	Bob Weir – guitar, vocals; Jay Lane – drums; Rob Wasserman – bass; Matthew Kelly – guitar, harmonica, vocals; Johnnie Johnson – keyboards; Dave Ellis – saxophone; Jeff Chimenti – keyboards
06/07/1997 – 04/05/1998	Bob Weir – guitar, vocals; Jay Lane – drums; Rob Wasserman – bass; Matthew Kelly – guitar, harmonica, vocals; Dave Ellis – saxophone; Jeff Chimenti – keyboards
09/06/1998	Bob Weir – guitar, vocals; Jay Lane – drums; Rob Wasserman – bass; Matthew Kelly – guitar, harmonica, vocals; Dave Ellis – saxophone; Jeff Chimenti – keyboards; Dave McNabb – guitar
09/09/1998 – 09/20/1998	Bob Weir – guitar, vocals; Jay Lane – drums; Rob Wasserman – bass; Dave Ellis – saxophone; Jeff Chimenti – keyboards; Dave McNabb – guitar
10/29/1998 – 12/02/1999	Bob Weir – guitar, vocals; Jay Lane – drums; Rob Wasserman – bass; Dave Ellis – saxophone; Jeff Chimenti – keyboards; Mark Karan – guitar, vocals
12/30/1999 – 03/26/2000	Bob Weir – guitar, vocals; Jay Lane – drums; Rob Wasserman – bass; Jeff Chimenti – keyboards; Mark Karan – guitar, vocals
05/05/2000 – 10/19/2002	Bob Weir – guitar, vocals; Jay Lane – drums; Rob Wasserman – bass; Jeff Chimenti – keyboards; Kenny Brooks – saxophone; Mark Karan – guitar, vocals
02/05/2003 – 02/09/2003	Bob Weir – guitar, vocals; Jay Lane – drums; Jeff Chimenti – keyboards; Kenny Brooks – saxophone; Mark Karan – guitar, vocals
03/04/2003 – 06/17/2007	Bob Weir – guitar, vocals; Jay Lane – drums; Robin Sylvester – bass; Jeff Chimenti – keyboards; Kenny Brooks – saxophone; Mark Karan – guitar, vocals
07/05/2007 – 04/12/2008	Bob Weir – guitar, vocals; Jay Lane – drums; Robin Sylvester – bass; Jeff Chimenti – keyboards; Kenny Brooks – saxophone; Steve Kimock – guitar
05/17/2008 – 01/26/2012	Bob Weir – guitar, vocals; Jay Lane – drums; Robin Sylvester – bass; Jeff Chimenti – keyboards; Kenny Brooks – saxophone; Mark Karan – guitar, vocals
08/16/2013 – 7/12/2014	Bob Weir – guitar, vocals; Jay Lane – drums; Robin Sylvester – bass guitar; Jeff Chimenti – keyboards; Steve Kimock – guitar; Rob Wasserman – upright bass

== Discography ==
- Evening Moods (2000)
- Live at Roseland (2001)
