= Jay Blakesberg =

American photographer

- Born: December 1, 1961 (age 64); Elizabeth, New Jersey, United States
- Occupations: Photographer & Filmmaker

Jay Blakesberg (born December 1, 1961) is an American, San Francisco-based, photographer and film maker.

== Biography ==
His suburban youth was spent mostly in Clark, New Jersey, where he first discovered a passion for taking pictures. As a teenager, Blakesberg began taking his father's Pentax camera to local concerts.

The Grateful Dead performed at the Meadowlands in 1978 and was the first Dead show he photographed. A few years on the road with a group of people called Deadheads resulted in the beginning of a body of photographic work that continues to this day. In the early 1980s, Blakesberg lived in Olympia, Washington, where he attended the Evergreen State College. More intensive study and focus on photography and filmmaking led him to an internship doing corporate photography and video in the San Francisco Bay Area in the mid-1980s. This is when Blakesberg started bringing his camera to every musical event he attended.

In 1986, he became the house photographer at the rock club The I-Beam on Haight Street in San Francisco. This is where he began to photograph the birth of the Alternative Rock movement, shooting such bands as Jane's Addiction, The Pixies and Soundgarden to name a few. During the late 1980s, the pace picked up for the number of Grateful Dead events Blakesberg was photographing.

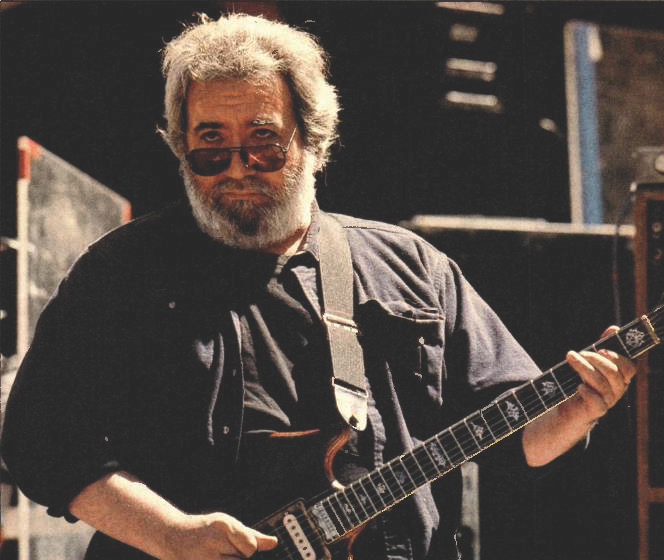
Jerry Garcia by Blakesberg c. 1988

In November 1987, with rumors of a free U2 concert in downtown San Francisco, Blakesberg got a call from Rolling Stone magazine photo editor Jodi Peckman to attend the concert and cover the event. This became Blakesberg's first published photo in a rock magazine. Since that first assignment, Blakeserg has shot over 300 assignments for Rolling Stone and has been published in print magazines from Time to Vanity Fair to Guitar Player as well as hundreds of other major magazines worldwide countless times. It was also during this time period that Blakesberg became staff photographer for BAM Magazine (Bay Area Music), and went on to shoot over 75 covers starting with indie rockers Camper Van Beethoven, and including artists such as Ice-T, Green Day, Primus, and the Red Hot Chili Peppers.

During most of the 1990s, Blakesberg was constantly shooting for print magazines and record companies, creating what is now an archive of 30 years of pop music icons. The late 1990s saw the explosion of the "Dot-com" movement in the Bay Area. Many of the most popular of the business magazines of the day were looking for an edgy look to cover these new "technology rockstars" and they turned to Blakesberg for his eclectic and original style of photography. Some of the magazines he shot for included the Red Herring, Business 2.0 and Fortune Magazine among many others. It was during this time that new "online" music magazines were founded, giving Blakesberg a new category of projects. The most prominent and one of the first of its kind was "Addicted to Noise" (ATN) founded by Rolling Stone magazine staff writer Michael Goldberg. Blakesberg became a frequent contributor to this new online magazine shooting artists such as Weezer, Phish, X, Radiohead and DJ Shadow exclusively for ATN. The commissioned assignments continued from music magazines and record companies, giving Blakesberg the opportunity to work with many well-known artists including Tom Waits, John Lee Hooker, Santana, Brian Wilson, Willie Nelson, Metallica, Talking Heads, Beck, Joni Mitchell, Neil Young, Tom Petty, Dead Hot Workshop and many others.

== Rock Out Books, Guitars that Jam and other publications ==
Just before September 11, 2001, Blakesberg secured a book deal to publish a coffee table book on his Grateful Dead archive. Published by Backbeat Books in fall of 2002, this book resonated with Deadheads everywhere. Working on that book gave Blakesberg the inspiration to start his own book publishing company, which eventually was born as Rock Out Books. Under that umbrella, Blakesberg has either published or packaged over a dozen books of his own photography as well as other photographers and artists. Some of the books published by Rock Out Books include: To Defy the Laws of Tradition – A Photographic Archive of Primus and Les Claypool, Portraits from the Belly of the Whale by Michael Garlington, A San Francisco Love Affair by Gene Wright, and Traveling on a High Frequency, Blakesberg's 30 year retrospective of his music photography.

In 2015, Blakesberg published Guitars That Jam—Portraits of the World's Most Storied Rock Guitars which explores the history of many of the guitars in the Jamband scene. Featuring images from live concerts and outdoor festivals, this volume captures the personal connection between artist and instrument. Along with the guitar's production and model, each image is accompanied by a story from the musician detailing the instrument's special characteristics, as well as its significance to them and rock history. This publication includes photographs of Neil Young, Carlos Santana, Jerry Garcia, Bob Weir, Phil Lesh, Trey Anastasio, Derek Trucks, and Warren Haynes to name just a few. Guitars That Jam features a foreword written by Warren Haynes and is an excellent photographic guide to the world of improvisational rock guitars.

== His works as a producer and director ==
In 2006, Blakesberg co-directed, with Bob Sarles, Phil Lesh & Friends Live at the Warfield, a live concert film featuring Grateful Dead bass player Phil Lesh with his band. Blakesberg has also co-directed "MTV Style" videos for Third Eye Blind and ALO, as well as directed videos for Jackie Greene, Tim Bluhm, and the Kronos Quartet.

Since the summer of 2007, Blakesberg has produced and directed the live concert video at numerous music festivals including Rothbury, Lollapallooza, Summer Camp Festival, moe.down, Nateva Festival, Langerado and Mountain Jam. Working in conjunction with the iClips Network at these festivals, Blakesberg has directed the video for such artists as The Flaming Lips, Furthur, Phil Lesh and Friends, The String Cheese Incident, Widespread Panic, The Black Crowes, The Allman Brothers Band, moe., Umphrey's McGee and many others. In the spring of 2009, Blakesberg went on the road with the re-united Grateful Dead – the original members calling themselves "The Dead" – as their tour photographer and video documentarian. The photographs from this tour were used in a print on demand tour book series, while over 15 short films created were used to document and market the tour. Currently Blakesberg continues to document Rock and Roll culture photographically while exploring numerous video projects.

== Album photography credits ==
partial list from AllMusic.com

- Grateful Dead, Dead Set (1981)
- Grateful Dead, Reckoning (1981)
- Meat Puppets, Huevos (1987)
- Dylan & the Dead, Dylan & the Dead (1989)
- Gin Blossoms, New Miserable Experience (1992)
- Counting Crows, August and Everything After [Deluxe Edition] (1993)
- Charlie Hunter, Charlie Hunter Trio (1993)
- Dramarama, Hi-Fi Sci-Fi (1993)
- Zero, Chance in a Million (1994)
- Rob Wasserman, Trios (1994)
- David Grisman Quintet, Dawganova (1995)
- Mother Hips, Part-Timer Goes Full (1995)
- Primus, Tales From the Punchbowl (1995)
- Timothy Leary, Beyond Life with Timothy Leary (1995)
- NOFX, Heavy Petting Zoo (1996)
- Mickey Hart, Mickey Hart's Mystery Box (1996)
- Jerry Garcia & David Grisman, Shady Grove (1996)
- Grateful Dead, Dick's Picks, Vol. 5: Oakland Auditorium Arena (1997)
- Smash Mouth, Fush Yu Mang [Clean] (1997)
- Robben Ford, Authorized Bootleg (1998)
- Primus, Rhinoplasty (1998)
- Barenaked Ladies, Stunt [UK Bonus CD] (1998)
- Squirrel Nut Zippers, Perennial Favorites (1998)
- Third Eye Blind, Blue [Clean] (1999)
- Santana, Supernatural & Supernatural [Legacy Edition] (1999)
- Michael Hedges, Torched (1999)
- Squirrel Nut Zippers, Bedlam Ballroom (2000)
- Galactic, Late for the Future (2000)
- E-40, Loyalty and Betrayal [Clean] (2000)
- Me First and the Gimme Gimmes, Blow in the Wind (2001)
- Mother Hips, Green Hills of Earth (2001)
- Josh Groban, Josh Groban (2001)
- Les Claypool's Frog Brigade, Live Frogs: Set 1 & Set 2 (2001)
- Smash Mouth, Smash Mouth (2001)
- John Hammond, Jr., Wicked Grin (2001)
- The Flaming Lips, Day They Shot a Hole in the Jesus Egg (2002)
- Tracy Chapman, Let It Rain [Australian Bonus Track] (2002)
- Blues Traveler, Travelogue: Blues Traveler Classics (2002)
- Gin Blossoms, 20th Century Masters - The Millennium Collection: The Best of Gin Blossoms (2003)
- Aaron Neville, Believe (2003)
- Pantera, Best of Pantera: Far Beyond the Great Southern Cowboy (2003)
- The Meters, Fiyo at the Fillmore, Vol. 1 (2003)
- Alkaline Trio, Good Mourning (2003)
- Maria Muldaur, Woman Alone with the Blues (2003)
- Jerry Garcia Band, After Midnight: Kean College, 2/28/80 (2004)
- John Lee Hooker, Come and See About Me (2004)
- Alice in Chains, Essential Alice in Chains (2004)
- The Neville Brothers, Walkin' in the Shadow of Life (2004)
- Nirvana, With the Lights Out (2004)
- Better Than Ezra, Greatest Hits (2005)
- Darol Anger, Heritage (2005)
- Joe Satriani, One Big Rush: The Genius of Joe Satriani (2005)
- BB. King, Ultimate Collection (2005)
- John Lee Hooker, Jr., Cold as Ice (2006)
- Soul Asylum, Welcome to the Minority: The A&M Years 1988-1991 (2007)
- Me First and the Gimme Gimmes, Have Another Ball! (2008)
- Taj Mahal, Maestro (2008)
- Thriving Ivory, Thriving Ivory [Wolfgang] (2008)
- Kronos Quartet, Floodplain (2009)
- ALO, Man of the World (2010)
- Jackie Greene, Till the Light Comes (2010)

== Concert films ==
- Phil Lesh & Friends Live at the Warfield, Produced and Co-directed with Bob Sarles (2006)

== Short form video ==
- Ann Atomic, If the Morning Never Comes (2007)
- Moonalice - Listen to those Eyes (2007)
- Moonalice - Whiter Shade of Pale (2008)
- Tim Bluhm - Spooked Cat Blues, (House of Bluhm - LP, 2008)
- Third Eye Blind - Don't Believe a Word, (Ursa Major - LP, 2009) [co-directed with Dave Alexander]
- ALO - Big Appetite, (Man of the World - LP, 2010) [co-directed with Dave Alexander]
- Jackie Greene - Medicine, (Till the Light Comes - LP, 2010)
- Jackie Greene - Shaky Ground, (Till the Light Comes - LP, 2010)
- Kronos Quartet - Music from 4 Fences (2010)

== Other producer / director credits ==
- High Sierra Music Festival (2007)
- Moe.Down Festival (2008, 2009, 2010)
- Mountain Jam (2008, 2009, 2010)
- Rothbury Festival (2008, 2009)
- Summer Camp Festival (2008, 2009, 2010)
- Langerado Music Festival (2008)
- Widespread Panic Live from New Orleans - Halloween (2008)
- All Good Music Festival (2008)
- 10,000 Lakes Music Festival (2008)
- Lollapalooza - two stages (2009)
- Mile High Music Festival - two stages (2009)
- The Dead (2009)
- Jackie Greene Live from Radio Woodstock (2010)
- Nateva Music Festival (2010)
- String Cheese Incident - Red Rocks - LIVE Concert PPV (2010)
- String Cheese Incident - Hornings Hideout - LIVE Concert PPV (2010)

== Books published ==
- Between the Dark and Light - The Grateful Dead Photography of Jay Blakesberg (2002)
- To Defy the Laws of Tradition - A Photographic Archive of Primus and Les Claypool (2003)
- Waking Up With a Placebo Headwound, 1987-2004 Images of the Flaming Lips from the Archives of Jay Blakesberg and Michelle Martin-Coyne (2004)
- Grateful Dead Day Planner (2005)
- Traveling on a High Frequency: Jay Blakesberg Photographs 1978-2008 (2008)
- Hippie Chick: A Tale of Love, Devotion & Surrender (2015)
