= Phil Lesh and Friends =

American rock band (1994–2024)

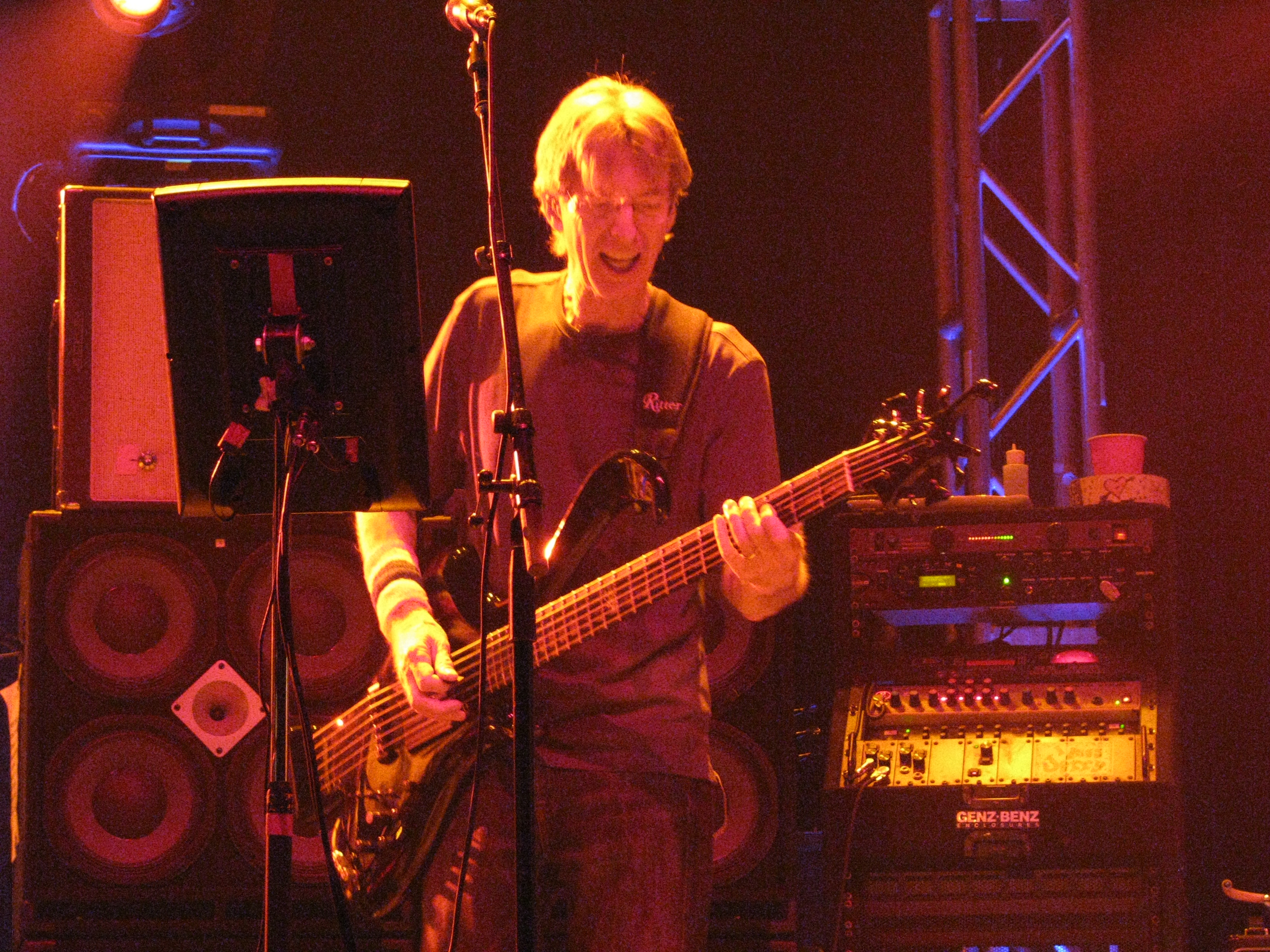
- Phil Lesh performing at a Phil Lesh and Friends concert at The Pageant in St. Louis, Missouri on July 3, 2008

Background information
- Origin: San Francisco, California, United States
- Genres: Rock; blues rock; hard rock; jazz-rock; psychedelic rock; jam rock
- Years active: 1994–2024
- Labels: Columbia, Relix
- Past members: Phil Lesh; See Members section for detailed list
- Website: http://www.phillesh.net

Phil Lesh and Friends was an American rock band formed and led by Phil Lesh, former bassist of the Grateful Dead.

Phil Lesh and Friends was not a traditional group in that several different lineups of musicians have played under the name, including groups featuring members of Phish, the Black Crowes, and the Allman Brothers Band.

== Music ==
The Phil & Friends concept took the music of the Grateful Dead (and a number of other influences, including Bob Dylan, Traffic, The Beatles, Led Zeppelin, Warren Haynes' band Gov't Mule, the Allman Brothers Band, etc.) and explored and interpreted it in new ways. Through the period known as the Quintet years, a Phil & Friends show was often focused on harder, faster rock than that which the Grateful Dead played, thanks in large part to Haynes' and Jimmy Herring's talents at the Southern rock style. Lesh was fond of calling it "Dixieland-style rock". However, all of the incarnations of Phil & Friends followed a trend of updating the Grateful Dead's body of work, and all were adept at the long, exploratory jams that were a trademark of the Grateful Dead. Phil & Friends was acclaimed for giving new life to the Grateful Dead's material.

Phil & Friends continued the Grateful Dead's tradition of allowing fans to record concerts and trade these recordings freely. Phil also used the internet to provide free soundboard recordings of many concerts through his website, and to provide high-resolution CD covers for fans to print. For his Summer 2006 tour, Phil partnered with Instant Live, a company that provided soundboard CDs of a concert immediately upon its completion.

== History ==
=== Original Phil Lesh and Friends ===
The first use of the Phil Lesh and Friends banner was on September 24, 1994, at the Berkeley Community Theatre. The band was an acoustic version of the Grateful Dead and featured members Phil Lesh, Jerry Garcia, Bob Weir and Vince Welnick. Grateful Dead drummers Bill Kreutzmann and Mickey Hart were not part of the band. After this gig the band name was put to rest until Phil formed a new band in 1998.

=== 1998–2000 permutations ===
In 1998, Lesh played with a rotating cast of musicians under the Phil Lesh and Friends name, mostly at San Francisco's The Fillmore. Bob Weir, Steve Kimock, Jeff Chimenti, Dave Ellis, Prairie Prince, Scott Amendola, Stan Franks, Gary Lambert, Bobby Strickland and Vince Welnick were among the musicians who participated in the gigs.

From April 1999 to September 2000, Lesh toured with a regularly rotating lineup of musicians that included Warren Haynes, Derek Trucks, Jorma Kaukonen, Jimmy Herring, Robben Ford, and members of Phish, Little Feat, The String Cheese Incident and Moe.

The opening concerts on April 15, 16, and 17, 1999 featured Phil along with John Molo on drums, Steve Kimock on guitar, and two members of Phish – Trey Anastasio on guitar and Page McConnell on keys.

After these opening concerts and until October 1999, Phil kept the same "core" of himself and Kimock, and generally Molo as well, while regularly rotating in new musicians on guitar and keys (and sometimes additional instruments). Over this period, the lineups included:

- May 29, 1999: Warren Haynes (guitar and vocals), Merl Saunders (keys), Donna Jean Godchaux (vocals)
- June 4–5, 1999: Prairie Prince (drums), Jorma Kaukonen (guitar and vocals), Pete Sears (keys), Zoe Ellis (vocals), Caitlin Cornwell (vocals)
- July 2–3, 1999: Bill Kreutzmann (drums), David Nelson (guitar and vocals), Barry Sless (guitar), Mookie Siegel (keys)
- August 12–22, 1999: This series of shows generally featured Warren Haynes on guitar and vocals and Kyle Hollingsworth from The String Cheese Incident on keys. Other members of The String Cheese Incident (Michael Kang (mandolin and violin), Bill Nershi (guitar)) occasionally joined the group, as did Al Schnier of Moe.
- October 7–9, 1999: Bobby Strickland (horns), Jeff Mattson (guitar and vocals), Rob Barraco (keys and vocals)
- October 21–27, 1999: This series of shows featured members of Little Feat -- Bill Payne (keys and vocals), Paul Barrere (guitar and vocals)

Steve Kimock left the tour on October 29, 1999, and Derek Trucks joined a few days later.

- October 29–30, 1999: Bill Payne (keys and vocals), Paul Barrere (guitar and vocals)
- October 31, 1999: Derek Trucks (guitar), Bill Payne (keys and vocals), Paul Barrere (guitar and vocals)

From November 1999 onwards, the "core" of the group was Phil, John Molo, and Rob Barraco on keys (except where noted)

- November 2–14, 1999: Derek Trucks (guitar), Warren Haynes (guitar and vocals);
- November 15, 1999: Derek Trucks (guitar), Warren Haynes (guitar and vocals), Jorma Kaukonen (guitar and vocals);
- November 17–18, 1999: Warren Haynes (guitar and vocals), Jorma Kaukonen (guitar and vocals);
- March 10, 2000: Robben Ford (guitar and vocals), Bill Payne (keys and vocals), Paul Barrere (guitar and vocals)
- April 6-May 27, 2000: Jeff Pevar (guitar and vocals), Jimmy Herring (guitar)

For the summer 2000 tour, the lineup primarily consistent of Robben Ford and members of Little Feat

- June 12–July 15, 2000: Robben Ford (guitar and vocals), Paul Barrere (guitar and vocals), Bill Payne (keys and vocals)
- July 16–18, 2000: Jimmy Herring (guitar), Paul Barrere (guitar and vocals), Bill Payne (keys and vocals)
- July 19–30, 2000: Robben Ford (guitar and vocals), Paul Barrere (guitar and vocals), Bill Payne (keys and vocals)

=== The Phil Lesh Quintet ===
The most permanent of the Phil Lesh and Friends lineups, known as the Phil Lesh Quintet (PLQ or just "the Q" for short) played on a mostly-regular basis from September 2000 through December 2003. The members of this incarnation were Lesh, Warren Haynes (guitar & vocals; also of Gov't Mule and Allman Brothers Band), Jimmy Herring (guitar; the Allman Brothers Band, Aquarium Rescue Unit, and most recently Widespread Panic), Rob Barraco (keyboards; the Dead, the Zen Tricksters, Dark Star Orchestra) and John Molo (drums; Bruce Hornsby and the Range, the Other Ones, Modereko, Keller Williams, David Nelson Band, Jemimah Puddleduck, and John Fogerty).

This lineup released the only Phil Lesh and Friends studio album, There and Back Again, on Columbia Records in 2002. It included several new songs from Lesh and Robert Hunter, longtime Grateful Dead lyricist, as well as one recent favorite from Jerry Garcia and Hunter, and several original contributions from Haynes, Barraco/Mattson and Herring.

During the summer tour of 2001, the band performed a series of instrumental numbers composed by Lesh. The songs were inspired by the Solar System.

=== Post Quintet Era ===
Ryan Adams started performing with the band in June 2005 after meeting Lesh at the Jammys, followed by Chris Robinson in November/December 2005.

=== 2006 ===
During 2006, Phil Lesh and Friends consisted of a core of musicians including Lesh, Larry Campbell (guitar, violin, slide guitar, mandolin, and vocals), Joan Osborne (vocals), Rob Barraco (keyboards and vocals), and John Molo (drums). On the first half of the summer tour, they were joined by John Scofield (guitar), and on the second half, by Barry Sless (pedal steel) and, during the third quarter of the tour and generally for the second set, by Trey Anastasio. Saxophonist Greg Osby joined the group for various concerts, particularly toward the end of the tour, and guest artists including Page McConnell and Dickey Betts sat in for individual sets.

Concerts with Scofield had a jazzy, astringent quality. Anastasio contributed a strong rock lead guitar to the sets he played in, while Sless brought a softer, more lyrical quality. The relative lack of comment about these lineups compared to the earlier "Quintet" and later 2007-8 configuration suggests that they were not as popular with Lesh's core fan base, but they gave unique and varied interpretations to some of the Grateful Dead's classics along with numerous other songs. Furthermore, the fact that the entire tour was distributed online and later via Instant Live CDs, and a live DVD was made of an early concert at the Warfield (with Scofield and Osby), meant that the various configurations of the year's lineup left a larger body of recorded work than many groups that worked together for years.

=== 2007–2008 ===
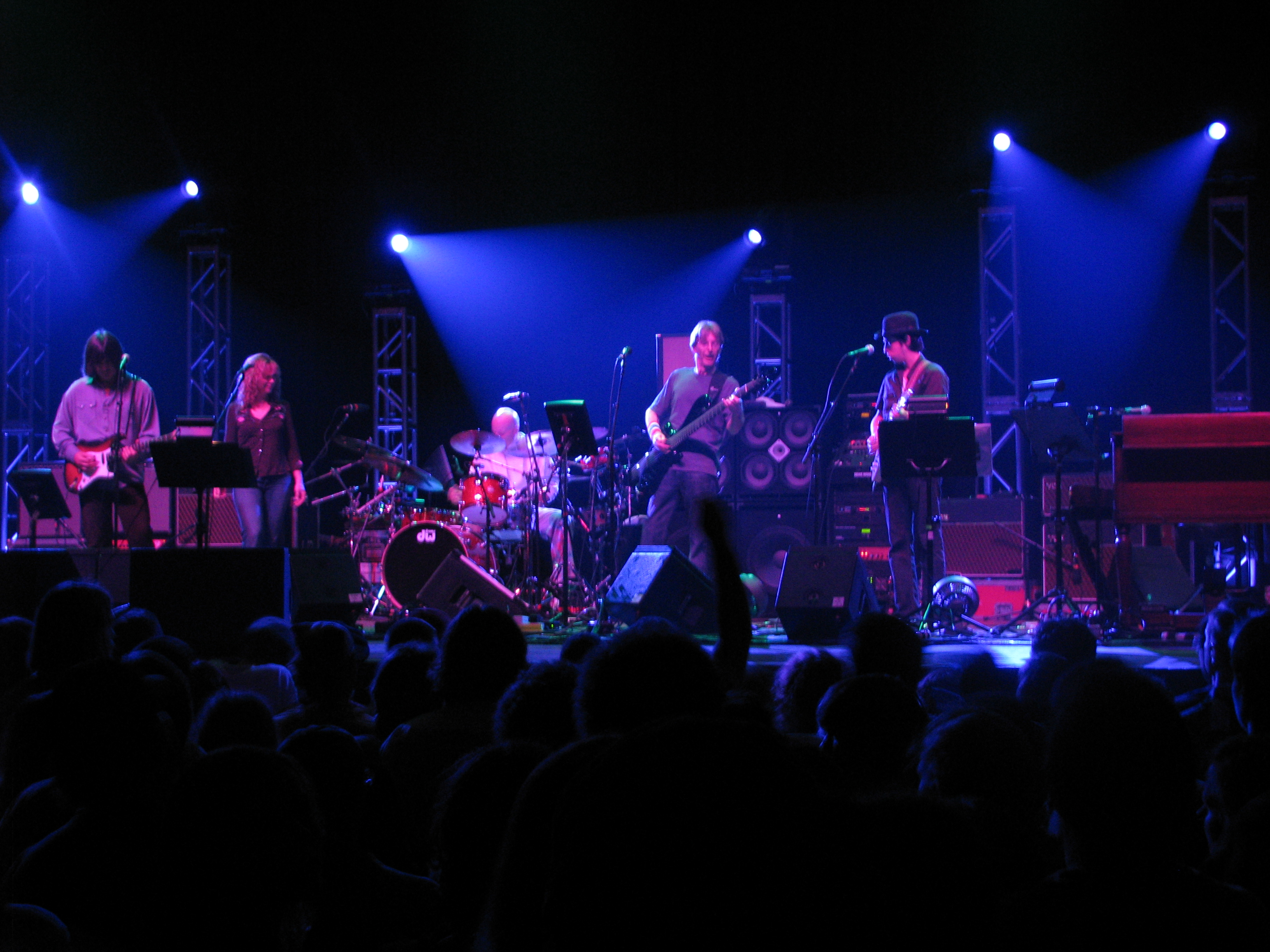
Phil Lesh & Friends performing at The Pageant in St. Louis, Missouri on July 3, 2008

A new formation of Phil & Friends, including Lesh, Larry Campbell (guitar, mandolin, fiddle), Teresa Williams (vocals), Jackie Greene (vocals and guitar), Steve Molitz (keyboards), and John Molo (drums), debuted in September 2007 in Santa Barbara, California.

On February 4, 2008, Phil and Friends joined Grateful Dead guitarist Bob Weir and drummer Mickey Hart, along with Barry Sless and RatDog guitarist Mark Karan, for a concert called "Deadheads for Obama", in support of Barack Obama's presidential campaign. The show was the first time that Weir, Hart, and Lesh had played together since 2004. Even more recently, the band performed the final shows at the Warfield Theatre in San Francisco. Bob Weir sat in for a run of five nights that included sets of the Grateful Dead's first few albums.

In the fall of 2008, Phil Lesh and Friends toured the Eastern United States, including a run of 14 shows in 19 days, known as "Philathon", at the Nokia Theatre Times Square in New York City. The final Phil Lesh and Friends performance until 2012 was on 12/31/08. Meanwhile, Phil had been touring with The Dead and Furthur.

=== 2012 ===
On Phil Lesh's website, 3 dates at the 1stBank Center in Broomfield, Colorado, were scheduled for the February 16, 17, and 18. A twelve-date appearance at Lesh's new club, Terrapin Crossroads, is set to commence on March 17, 2012, which many old members of the band returning to appear alongside Lesh, as well as a few new members.

On April 26 through April 29, the original Quintet returned, performing four sold-out shows at Terrapin Crossroads.

The band also appeared at the 2012 Gathering of the Vibes and All Good Music Festival, featuring Phil Lesh, Jackie Greene, Grahame Lesh, Brian Lesh, Joe Russo, Larry Campbell, and Teresa Williams.

=== 2014 ===
In 2014, Phil Lesh signed an exclusive deal with concert promoter Peter Shapiro to perform 44 concerts across Shapiro's venues. Thirty of those performances would take place at the Capitol Theatre in Port Chester, New York, with the others at the Brooklyn Bowls in New York, London and Las Vegas, as well as the Lockn' Festival in Arrington, Virginia.

Phil Lesh and Friends featuring Warren Haynes, Jackie Greene, John Medeski and Joe Russo performed two shows on April 14 and 15 at Brooklyn Academy of Music.

Phil and Friends then played two shows at Central Park's Rumsey Playfield on May 28 and 31. The incarnation of this band included Warren Haynes, John Scofield, John Medeski and Joe Russo.

=== 2015–2016 ===
Starting in January 2015, Phil Lesh and Friends celebrated the Grateful Dead's 50th Anniversary by performing tribute concerts, recreating select concerts from the Grateful Dead's 30-year career, at his restaurant Terrapin Crossroads, along with select Grateful Dead Recreational Tribute shows at The Capitol Theatre, in Port Chester, New York. These celebrations of the Grateful Dead's 50th Anniversary continued into 2016.

In 2015, Phil Lesh and Friends had to cancel two shows at Terrapin Crossroads on October 24–25, due to Phil Lesh's bladder cancer diagnosis.

At the 2015 Lockn' Festival, Carlos Santana made his debut as one of Phil's "Friends", sitting in for the whole set. The next night at Lock'n, The Chris Robinson Brotherhood also sat in with Phil Lesh & Friends.

In celebration of Phil's 76th birthday in 2015, Phil resurrected the classic "Q" lineup for a 2-night run at The Capitol Theatre, in Port Chester.

In January 2016, it was announced that Phil Lesh and Friends would perform a New Year's Eve run in Hawaii, from December 29–31.

=== 2023-2024 ===
In March 2023, Phil Lesh performed his 100th show at The Capitol Theatre.

Lesh died on October 25, 2024. He was 84.

== Members ==
The following musicians accompanied bassist and vocalist Phil Lesh with various lineups of Phil Lesh and Friends from 1999 (with one performance in 1994).
Note: This list is incomplete.

- Ryan Adams – guitar, vocals
- Stu Allen - guitar, vocals
- Trey Anastasio – guitar, vocals
- Rob Barraco – keyboards, vocals
- Rick Mitarotonda – guitar, vocals
- Paul Barrere – guitar, vocals
- Michael Mark Bello – tenor saxophone, kazoo, vocals, percussion, drums, horn arrangements
- Duane Betts - guitar, vocals
- Eric "Benny" Bloom – trumpet
- Nicki Bluhm – vocals
- Tim Bluhm – guitar, vocals
- Travis Book – double bass
- Holly Bowling – keyboards
- Larry Campbell – guitar, vocals
- Neal Casal – guitar, vocals
- James Casey (musician) - saxophone, clarinet, vocals
- Jeff Chimenti – keyboards, vocals
- Cailan Cornwell – vocals
- Natalie Cressman - trombone, vocals
- Jason Crosby – keyboards
- Mikaela Davis - harp, vocals
- Karl Denson – saxophone, flute, percussion
- Luther Dickinson – guitar, vocals
- JD Simo – guitar, vocals
- Rob Eaton – guitar, vocals
- Dave Ellis – saxophone
- Zoe Ellis – vocals
- Alan Evans – drums
- Neal Evans – keyboards
- Andy Falco – guitar
- Jon Fishman – drums
- Robben Ford – guitar
- Donna Jean Godchaux – vocals
- Jerry Garcia – guitar, vocals
- Jeremy Garrett – fiddle
- Jon Graboff – guitar
- Griffin Goldsmith – drums, vocals
- Taylor Goldsmith – guitar, vocals
- Mike Gordon – bass, vocals
- Jackie Greene – guitar, vocals
- Andy Hall – dobro
- Jennifer Hartswick trumpet, vocals
- Warren Haynes – guitar, vocals
- Amy Helm – vocals
- Jimmy Herring – guitar
- Kyle Hollingsworth – keyboards
- Ross James – guitar, vocals
- Gloria Jones – vocals
- Stanley Jordan – guitar, vocals
- John Kadlecik – guitar, vocals
- Mark Karan – guitar, vocals
- Michael Kang – guitar, vocals
- Jorma Kaukonen – guitar, vocals
- Steve Kimock – guitar
- Marcus King – guitar, vocals
- Alex Koford – percussion, vocals
- Bill Kreutzmann – drums
- Jaclyn LaBranch – vocals
- Scott Law – guitar, vocals
- Dan Lebowitz - guitar, pedal steel, vocals
- Tony Leone – drums
- Brian Lesh – guitars, vocals
- Grahame Lesh – guitars, vocals
- Ezra Lipp – drums, vocals
- Scott Guberman – keyboards, vocals
- Mark Levy – drums
- Adam MacDougall – keyboards
- Branford Marsalis – saxophone
- Jeff Mattson – guitar, vocals
- John Mayer – guitar, vocals
- Page McConnell – keyboards, vocals
- John Medeski – keyboards
- Trevor Menear – guitar, vocals, harmonica
- Scott Metzger – guitar, vocals
- Steve Molitz – keyboards
- John Molo – drums
- David Nelson – guitar, vocals
- Bill Nershi – guitar, vocals
- Tom Osander – drums, vocals
- Anders Osborne – guitar, vocals
- Joan Osborne – vocals
- Greg Osby – saxophone
- Chris Pandolfi – banjo
- Lee Pardini – keyboards
- Bill Payne – keyboards, vocals
- Jeff Pevar – guitar
- Prairie Prince – drums
- Chris Robinson – guitar, vocals
- Joe Russo – drums
- Merl Saunders – keyboards
- Jaz Sawyer – drums
- Al Schnier – guitar, vocals
- John Scofield – guitar
- Melvin Seals – keyboards
- Pete Sears – keyboards
- Mookie Siegel – keyboards
- Jeff Sipe – drums
- Barry Sless – guitar
- Bobby Strickland – horns
- Benmont Tench – keyboards
- Derek Trucks – guitar
- Bob Weir – guitar, vocals
- Vince Welnick – keyboards, vocals
- Teresa Williams – vocals
- Ryan Zoidis – saxophone

== Discography ==
- Love Will See You Through (1999)
- There and Back Again (2002)
- Live at the Warfield (2006)
