= Bob Sarles =

American film and television editor

- Born: Buffalo, New York, U.S.
- Occupations: Documentary filmmaker, film editor and radio host.

Bob Sarles is an American documentary filmmaker, film editor and radio host based in San Francisco.

== Biography ==
Bob Sarles is an American radio host, documentary filmmaker and a Primetime Emmy nominated film and television editor.

In the early 1970s, as a teen in the suburbs of Buffalo, New York, Bob Sarles began making films in the 8mm and Super8 formats and videos using half inch reel to reel portable video equipment. While still a high school student he attended workshops and screenings at Media Study/Buffalo, a regional development center for film and video makers that provided free access to film and video equipment. Sarles received his bachelor's degree in broadcasting and film from Boston University, where he co-produced and edited the short documentary Fantastic, which had its television premiere on Showtime and later was broadcast on KQED-TV in San Francisco.

Sarles was admitted to and spent one semester attending UCLA's graduate film school before taking an indefinite leave of absence in order to move to San Francisco, where he began his professional career as a film editor. He initially began working on documentaries, corporate and industrial films as an assistant editor and editor, eventually working on the editorial crews of independent and major feature films as an apprentice film editor, assistant film editor and sound editor, while also taking jobs editing music videos, commercials and educational films.

As an apprentice film editor and assistant film editor, Sarles worked on the post production crews of feature films including The Right Stuff, Henry & June, My Blue Heaven and Dirty Rotten Scoundrels. He was a sound editor on Breakin', Romero, and The Money Tree.

In 1986 Sarles founded his own film production company, Ravin' Films, which was incorporated in 2010. Sarles operates his production company with his longtime filmmaking partner Christina Keating, who is also his wife.

In 1991 Sarles joined the staff of the special effects company Industrial Light & Magic, as the manager of the company's Commercial Editorial Department. There he edited television spots for clients such as Nike, Reebok, Chevrolet, Toyota and Miller Beer working with directors including Michael Owens, Steve Beck, Matthew Robbins, Joe Johnston, James Cameron, and Barry Sonnenfeld.

Sarles co-directed (with Brett Berns) and edited the feature documentary film BANG! The Bert Berns Story, which had its premiere at the 2016 SXSW Film Festival and has screened at the Mill Valley Film Festival, Seattle International Film Festival, Vancouver International Film Festival, Los Angeles' Don't Knock The Rock Festival, Chicago's CIMMFest and the DocNYC Festival in New York City, and other film festivals and special screenings, including the Grammy Museum in Los Angeles and the Rock & Roll Hall of Fame in Cleveland. The film, distributed by Abramorama, had its theatrical release in the spring of 2017.

He co-edited the Peabody Award-winning documentary series Moon Shot, for which he shared a Primetime Emmy nomination for editing, the ABC documentary The Story of Fathers & Sons, three of the first four seasons of MTV's ground breaking reality television series The Real World. and unscripted and documentary television series produced for NBC, ABC, Bravo, A&E, VH1, Discovery, FX, WE, Oxygen and TVOne including Million Dollar Listing Los Angeles Shahs Of Sunset, Ultimate Fighter, Kendra On Top, Braxton Family Values, American Chopper, The Mole, Making The Band, and VH1's Basketball Wives.

Sarles edited award-winning music videos for a number of top rock, rap and country artists including ZZ Top's 1984 MTV Best Group Video Legs which was co-edited with Sim Sadler and also received best editing nominations from the MTV Video Music Awards, The Billboard Music Video Awards and the American Music Video Awards, and Green Day's video Longview which was nominated for the 1994 MTV Best Group Video.

Sarles edited the zombie horror film The Video Dead, and the feature documentary The True Adventures Of The Real Beverly Hillbillies. He co-produced and edited the feature documentary film Wrestling With Satan. He was principal cinematographer and co-producer of the feature documentary Son Of A Bitch!

Sarles was a producer and editor of VH1's Behind The Music and was a consulting producer on the documentary television series San Francisco Sounds: A Place in Time and the PBS documentary Respect Yourself: The Stax Records Story. He directed and edited films that are on display at the Rock and Roll Hall of Fame in Cleveland, Experience Music Project in Seattle, and the Stax Museum of American Soul Music in Memphis.

Bob Sarles co-directed and edited the feature documentary Born In Chicago which premiered on the UK cable channel SkyArts and screened at the prestigious Palm Springs International Film Festival.

Sarles has directed music videos for Otis Redding, Jorma Kaukonen, The Anthony Paul Soul Orchestra, and Ramblin' Jack Elliott and Roy Rogers. Bob Sarles directed and edited the music video for the Roger McGuinn penned song "Ballad of Easy Rider" as recorded by John Hurlbut and Jorma Kaukonen for their album The River Flows. He co-produced, directed and edited the triple platinum selling DVD boxed set Rock and Roll Hall of Fame Live for Time Life. Sarles edited and co-directed (with Jay Blakesberg) Live At The Warfield, a concert film featuring Grateful Dead bass player Phil Lesh with his band, for Image Entertainment. He directed and edited the DVDs Fly Jefferson Airplane and John Lee Hooker: Come See About Me for Eagle Rock Entertainment.

Through his production company Ravin' Films, Inc. Sarles produced a number of on camera interviews for the Rock and Roll Hall of Fame's ongoing Oral History Project with artists including: Al Kooper, Barry Goldberg, Eric Burdon, Frankie Valli, Jerry Moss, Stewart Copeland and Wayne Kramer. Sarles has directed interview and behind the scenes shoots with recording artists including Sly & The Family Stone, Keith Richards, Van Morrison, Carlos Santana, Jorma Kaukonen, Don McLean, Norton Buffalo, Roy Rogers, Ry Cooder, Rosanne Cash, Phil Lesh and John Mayer.

The documentary film Feed Your Head: The Psychedelic Era was produced, directed and edited by Bob Sarles as was the well received documentary film Sweet Blues: A Film About Mike Bloomfield that was included as a DVD in the Columbia/Legacy boxed set Michael Bloomfield: From His Head to His Heart to His Hands and screened at a number of film festivals.

Sarles was a producer and editor of a two-hour television documentary “The Nine Lives of Ozzy Osbourne” produced for A&E and was post production producer and editor of the historical documentary “Marta Hari: The Naked Spy” which premiered at the Santa Fe Film Festival and aired on PBS America. He was an editor on the true crime documentary “I Got A Monster".

From 2021 till 2023 Sarles hosted two weekly internet radio programs, “The Old Haight Ashbury Radio Show” and "Bob's Blues & All That Jazz" on the San Francisco community internet radio station Radio Valencia. In April 2023 Bob Sarles began hosting “Ravin’ Radio with Boomer Bob,” a weekly freeform radio program airing on community broadcast radio station KXSF 102.5 FM in San Francisco. In January 2023 Sarles revived his weekly two hour blues and jazz program on KXSF, rechristened as "Blues & All That Jazz." Additionally, in April 2026, under the alias of "Buster Scruggs," Bob Sarles began hosting KXSF Radio's "Barndance" country music radio show once a month as part of a team of revolving DJ's.
