= Scott Guberman =

American keyboardist (born 1971)

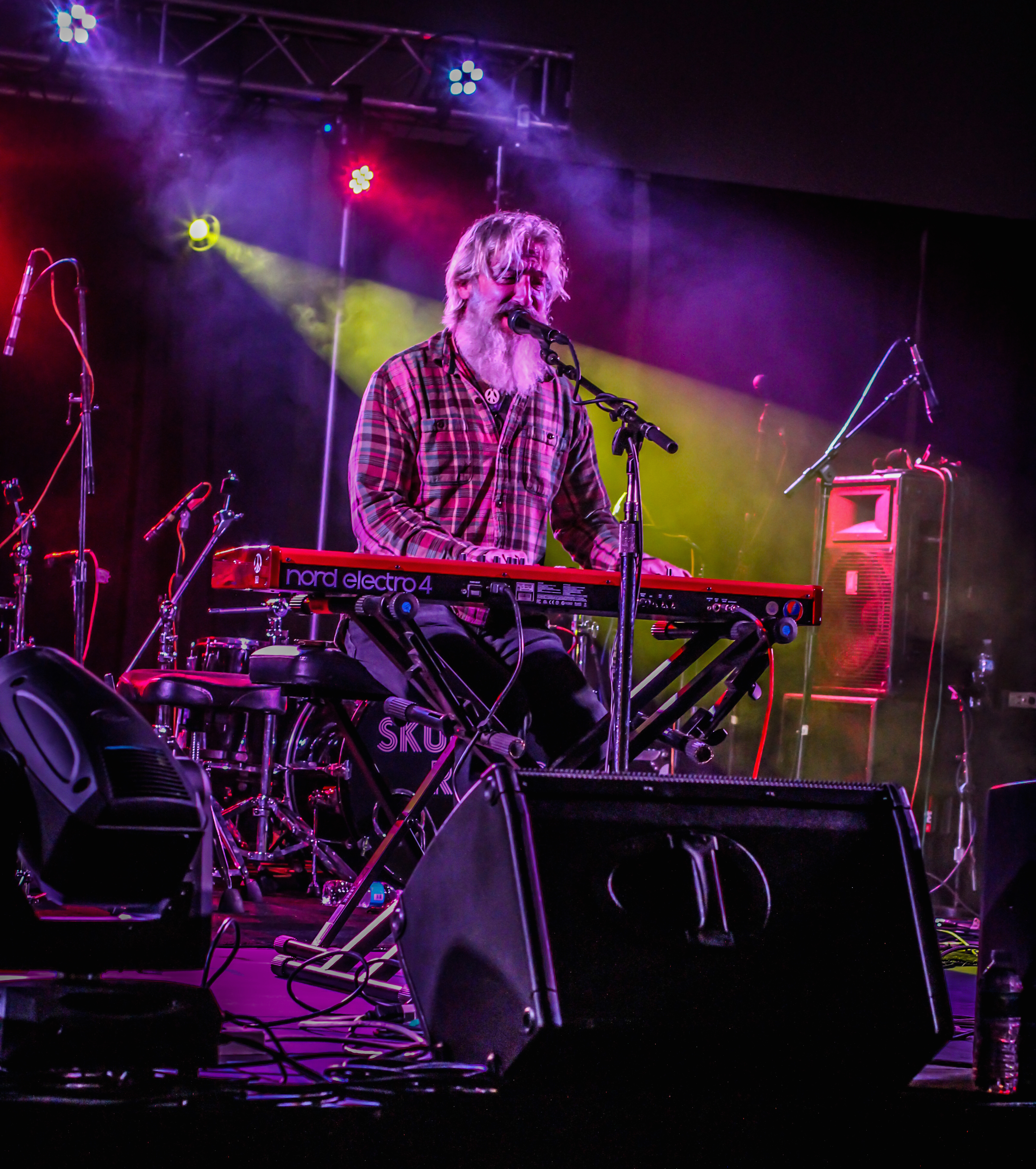

Background information
- Born: March 19, 1971 (age 55); New York City, New York, U.S.
- Genres: Psychedelic Rock
- Occupation: Musician
- Instruments: Keyboards, Hammond B3, Vocals
- Website: https://www.scottguberman.com

Scott Guberman is an American keyboardist best known for his work with founding Grateful Dead bassist, Phil Lesh. After relocating to the Bay Area from the East Coast In 2015, Guberman was asked to join Phil Lesh's band "Communion". He used to play regularly as a member of Phil Lesh & Friends and with Lesh in other formations at the former Terrapin Crossroads.

== Background ==
Guberman began playing piano at the age of 5. During his high school years, Guberman began experimenting with synthesizers and electric pianos. During this time, Guberman began playing in rock bands regularly.

After high school, Guberman attended The Hartt School of Music where he studied classical piano.

Guberman gained recognition amongst The Grateful Dead community in the early 2000s while playing Hammond organ regularly with Rock & Roll Hall of Famer and former Grateful Dead keyboardist, Tom Constanten. During this time, Guberman also toured with Vince Welnick, The Grateful Dead's final keyboardist. Guberman toured throughout the East Coast with The Vince Welnick Band from 2003-2006.
