= There and Back Again (Phil Lesh album) =

Studio album by Phil Lesh and Friends
- Released: May 21, 2002
- Recorded: January 2002
- Genre: Rock; Jam band
- Length: 63:20
- Label: Columbia
- Producer: Don Gehman

Phil Lesh and Friends chronology
Love Will See You Through (1999)	There and Back Again (2002)	Live at the Warfield (2006)

Professional ratings
Review scores
Source	Rating
Allmusic	4/5 stars
The Music Box	2.5/5 stars

There and Back Again is the second album by the rock group Phil Lesh and Friends. The band's only studio album, it was released by Columbia Records in 2002. The album is "lovingly dedicated to the memory of Cody."

== Track listing ==
1. "Celebration" (Lesh, Hunter)
2. "Night of a Thousand Stars" (Lesh, Haynes, Hunter)
3. "The Real Thing" (Haynes)
4. "Again and Again" (Herring, Hunter)
5. "No More Do I" (Lesh, Hunter)
6. "Patchwork Quilt" (Haynes)
7. "Liberty" (Garcia, Hunter)
8. "Midnight Train" (Lesh)
9. "Leave Me Out of This" (Barraco, Mattson)
10. "Welcome to the Underground" (Haynes)
11. "Rock-n-Roll Blues" (Lesh, Hunter)

=== Limited edition ===
There and Back Again was released in two different versions, the regular album, and a Limited Edition album. The Limited Edition includes a second CD that is 52:14 long and that contains studio and live performances of four more songs.

1. "Passenger" (Lesh, Monk) – recorded at The Plant, Sausalito, California
2. "St. Stephen" (Garcia, Hunter, Lesh) – 4/4/02, Denver, Colorado, with Derek Trucks
3. "Dark Star" (Garcia, Hunter, Lesh, Weir, Kreutzmann, McKernan) – 12/31/01, Oakland, California, with Derek Trucks
4. "The Eleven" (Lesh, Hunter) – 3/30/02, San Francisco, California

== Personnel ==
Phil Lesh and Friends

- Phil Lesh – bass, vocals
- Warren Haynes – guitar, vocals
- Jimmy Herring – guitar
- Rob Barraco – keyboards, vocals
- John Molo – drums, percussion

Additional musicians

- Michael Kang – violin on "Rock-n-Roll Blues"

Production

- Produced by Don Gehman
- Mixing: Mark Dearnley, Don Gehman
