= Live at the Warfield (Phil Lesh and Friends album) =

Live album by Phil Lesh and Friends
- Released: October 31, 2006
- Recorded: May 18 & 19, 2006, Warfield Theatre, San Francisco
- Genres: Rock, jam band
- Label: Image Entertainment

Phil Lesh and Friends chronology
There and Back Again (2002)	Live at the Warfield (2006)

Professional ratings
Review scores
Source	Rating
All About Jazz	(not rated)
AllMusic	3/5 stars
Jambands.com	(not rated)

Live at the Warfield is a two CD album by the rock group Phil Lesh and Friends. It was recorded live at the Warfield in San Francisco, California, on May 18 and May 19, 2006.

Live at the Warfield is also a concert performance DVD recorded at the same shows. The track listing for the DVD is completely different from that of the album. The DVD was produced and directed by Jay Blakesberg and Bob Sarles. The director of photography was Bill Zarchy.

== CD Track listing ==
=== Disc 1 ===
1. "Shakedown Street"
2. "Mr. Charlie"
3. "Pride Of Cucamonga"
4. "Cosmic Charlie"
5. "Scarlet Begonias"
6. "They Love Each Other"
7. "Turn On Your Lovelight"
8. "Donor Rap"

=== Disc 2 ===
1. "The Wheel"
2. "Dark Star"
3. "Morning Dew"
4. "I Know You Rider"
5. "The Other One"
6. "Dark Star"
7. "The Other One"
8. "Box of Rain"

== DVD track listing ==
1. "Uncle John's Band"
2. "Eyes of the World"
3. "St. Stephen"
4. "The Eleven"
5. "Caution (Do Not Stop On Tracks)"
6. "All Along the Watchtower"
7. "New Speedway Boogie"
8. "Unbroken Chain"
9. "Help On the Way"
10. "Slipknot!"
11. "Franklin's Tower"

== Personnel ==
- Phil Lesh – electric bass, vocals
- Joan Osborne – vocals
- John Scofield – guitar
- Larry Campbell – guitar, pedal steel, fiddle, mandolin, vocals
- Greg Osby – saxophone
- Rob Barraco – keyboards, vocals
- John Molo – drums
