= Love Will See You Through =

Live album by Phil Lesh and Friends
- Released: October 26, 1999
- Recorded: June 4–5, 1999 at Warfield Theatre, San Francisco, CA
- Genre: Rock
- Length: 149:11
- Label: Grateful Dead Records
- Producer: Phil and Jill Lesh

Phil Lesh and Friends chronology
Love Will See You Through (1999)	There and Back Again (2002)

Professional ratings
Review scores
Source	Rating
Allmusic	3/5 stars
The Music Box	3.5/5 stars

Love Will See You Through is the first album by the rock band Phil Lesh and Friends. It is also known as Highlights Volume One. It was recorded live on June 4 and 5, 1999 at the Warfield Theatre in San Francisco, and released later that year.

In addition to Phil Lesh, this version of the constantly changing lineup of Phil Lesh and Friends includes Jorma Kaukonen (Jefferson Airplane, Hot Tuna), Steve Kimock (Kingfish, Missing Man Formation, The Other Ones), Pete Sears (Rod Stewart, Jefferson Starship, Hot Tuna), Prairie Prince (The Tubes, Journey, Missing Man Formation), Caitlin Cornwell, and Zoe Ellis. Lesh and Kaukonen each sing lead vocals on about half the songs on the album, and the band's vocal capabilities are enhanced by backup singers Cornwell and Ellis. As usual for Phil Lesh and Friends, the musical emphasis is on jam band style interpretations of Grateful Dead songs, although the album also includes a few numbers from the Airplane and Hot Tuna repertoire.

== Track listing ==
=== CD One ===
1. "Dancin' in the Street" (Stevenson, Gaye, I. Hunter) – 22:07
2. "Broken Arrow" (Robertson) – 8:56
3. "Big Boss Man" (Dixon, Smith) – 6:57
4. "Friend of the Devil" (Garcia, Dawson, Hunter) – 6:46
5. "Mr. Charlie" (McKernan, Hunter) – 8:04
6. "Mississippi Half Step Uptown Toodeloo" (Garcia, Hunter) – 8:58
7. "Franklin's Tower" (Garcia, Kreutzmann, Hunter) – 14:35

=== CD Two ===
1. "Dupree's Diamond Blues" (Garcia, Hunter) – 4:39
2. "I Am the Light of This World" (Davis) – 4:05
3. "Good Shepherd" (traditional, arranged by Kaukonen) – 10:55
4. "Mashed Potato Jam" (Kaukonen, Kimock, Lesh, Prince, Sears) – 12:46
5. "New Potato Caboose" (Lesh, Peterson) – 3:31
6. "Caboose Jam" (Kaukonen, Kimock, Lesh, Prince, Sears) – 10:47
7. "St. Stephen" (Garcia, Lesh, Hunter) – 26:02

Note: CD Two, tracks 4–6 recorded June 4, 1999; remainder recorded June 5, 1999.

== Personnel ==
=== Phil Lesh and Friends ===
- Phil Lesh — bass, vocals
- Jorma Kaukonen — guitar, vocals
- Steve Kimock — guitar
- Pete Sears — keyboards
- Prairie Prince — drums
- Caitlin Cornwell — vocals
- Zoe Ellis — vocals

=== Production ===
- Phil and Jill Lesh – producers
- Jill Lesh for Cygnus Productions – management
- Jeffrey Norman – recording
- John Cutler – mixing
- Ram Rod, Steve Parish, Steve Kimock – crew
- Prairie Prince, Mick Anger – cover art
- Jay Blakesberg, Susana Millman – photography
- Gecko Graphics – design
