= The Video Dead =

1987 film by Robert Falcon Scott

- Directed by: Robert Scott
- Written by: Robert Scott
- Produced by: Robert Scott
- Starring: Roxanna Augesen; Rocky Duvall; Michael St. Michaels; Jennifer Miro
- Cinematography: Greg Becker
- Edited by: Bob Sarles
- Music by: Leonard Marcel; Stuart Rabinowitsh; Kevin McMahon
- Production companies: Interstate 5 Productions; Highlight Productions; Manson International
- Distributed by: Embassy Home Entertainment
- Release date: November 30, 1987
- Running time: 90 minutes
- Country: United States
- Language: English

The Video Dead is a 1987 American horror film written and directed by Robert Scott and starring Roxanna Augesen. The plot concerns a paranormal television that causes zombies from a never-ending film to enter the real world. The film was released direct-to-video.

== Plot ==
An unsolicited television is delivered to a writer's house. The writer discovers that the only program the television is capable of picking up is a seemingly endless, plotless, black and white zombie horror film titled Zombie Blood Nightmare. Despite being unplugged, the television reactivates and releases the film's zombies (Jack, the Bride, Ironhead, Jimmy D., and Half-Creeper), who attack and kill the writer. The next day, the delivery men arrive to claim the set, realizing that it was meant to go to the Institute for Paranormal Research; they find only the body of the writer, bound in his front hallway and dressed in party clothes.

Three months later, teenagers Zoe and Jeff arrive at the house ahead of their parents, who are moving back to the United States after years abroad. Jeff befriends dog walker April and she accompanies him home, where the dog she is watching escapes into the woods. The dog comes upon the zombies that escaped the television set and have since been living in the woods. The zombies kill the dog, meanwhile Jeff and April are searching for it and later find the remains. The zombies follow the pair back to the neighborhood.

That afternoon, a man named Joshua Daniels comes looking for the television set, claiming that he bought it at a yard sale and mailed it to the Paranormal Institute after it killed his wife. Jeff turns him away but later that night discovers the television set, which has mysteriously migrated to the attic. A bizarre woman briefly appears on the set, beckoning to Jeff, before a man appears and kills her, revealing her to be a zombie. The man, who calls himself "The Garbage Man", says that the only way to prevent more zombies from appearing is to tape a mirror to it.

The next day, the zombies break into April's house. Ironhead angrily strangles their maid to death before they go upstairs and kill April's father. Their next-door neighbors also die at the hands of the zombies. Jeff, Zoe, and April barricade themselves inside of their own home, along with Joshua, who has returned to reclaim the television set. Joshua explains the psychology of the zombies: realizing that they are in a liminal state between life and death, the zombies kill humans out of envy. They are repulsed by mirrors because it reminds them of their own hideousness, and attack when they sense fear. The zombies can be tricked into believing that they are dead by wounding and then dismembering them, but they must be left unburied. They can also be destroyed by trapping them in an enclosed space, which causes them to enter a psychotic state and cannibalize one another.

Despite the fortifications, Jimmy D. breaks in and incapacitates April. Zoe and Jeff lock the zombie out of the house after it leaves with April's body. The next morning, Joshua and Jeff head into the woods to hunt down the zombies. Joshua sets traps and takes up a sniper position while using Jeff as bait. Using a bow and arrows, they shoot and incapacitate all the zombies but The Bride, whom they pursue. Joshua is killed, and Jeff gets trapped in a shed, where he discovers April's dead body. The Bride, having armed herself with a chainsaw, kills Jeff inside the shed (not before she is decapitated by Jeff using a hatchet). The other zombies wake up, shaking off their illusions of death, and make their way back to the neighborhood.

They return to the house, where Zoe is alone. Remembering that the zombies only attack when they sense fear, Zoe invites the zombies in, and they become docile. Zoe discovers a mirror on the basement door, tricks the zombies into entering the basement, and they go berserk. After they consume each other, their remains are sucked back into the television, and Zombie Blood Nightmare finally ends.

Sometime later, Zoe's parents come to visit her in the hospital, where she is being treated for post-traumatic stress disorder. They unwittingly bring her the possessed television set from the house, hoping that a familiar item will aid her recovery. After everyone leaves, the television plays Zombie Blood Nightmare again. Zoe looks at the screen in horror as Jack, within the TV, looks directly at her and starts growling; Zoe screams.

== Cast ==
- Michael St. Michaels as Henry Jordan
- Thaddeus Golas as Deliveryman #1
- Douglas Bell as Deliveryman #2
- Al Millan as Taxi Driver/Undead Ironhead
- Roxanna Augesen as Zoe Blair
- Lory Ringuette as Mover #1/Undead Half Creeper
- George Kernan as Mover #2
- Rocky Duvall as Jeff Blair
- Sam David McClelland as Joshua Daniels
- Jennifer Miro as The Woman
- Vickie Bastel as April Ellison
- Libby Russler as Maria
- Garrett Dressler as Mr. Ellison
- Melissa Martin as B-Movie Housewife
- Cliff Watts as The Garbageman
- Patrick Treadway as Undead Jimmy D

== Release ==
The Video Dead was released direct-to-video. Embassy Home Entertainment released it on VHS in November 1987. The film debuted in widescreen format on MGM HD on November 1, 2009. Scream Factory (a division of Shout! Studios), released the film in a special edition DVD and Blu-ray combo-pack in a double feature with the 1986 film TerrorVision on February 19, 2013.

== Reception ==
David Maine of PopMatters wrote that it "contains a few suspenseful scenes and some over-the-top moments, and might be of interest to zombie fans or zombie completists". Adam Tyner of DVD Talk called it "essential viewing for fanatics of off-kilter '80s horror". Patrick Naugle of DVD Verdict wrote, "The only thing The Video Dead has going for it are above average make-up effects for a film of this ilk." Bruce Kooken of HorrorNews.Net praised the non-traditional nature of the zombies and wrote, "All the zombie lovers in the world need to see The Video Dead. It is a great 80s zombie incarnation filled with little gems of humor that all fans of the genre can find entertaining." Writing in The Zombie Movie Encyclopedia, academic Peter Dendle said, "This unsung zombie adventure is a nice surprise, offering gripping action as well as thoughtful meditations on zombies."

In 2010, Bloody Disgusting included the film in their list of Top Ten Most Awesome Chainsaw Scenes.

== See also ==
- 1987 in film
- List of zombie films
