= Terrapin Crossroads =

Music venue

Coordinates: 37°58′5″N 122°31′0″W

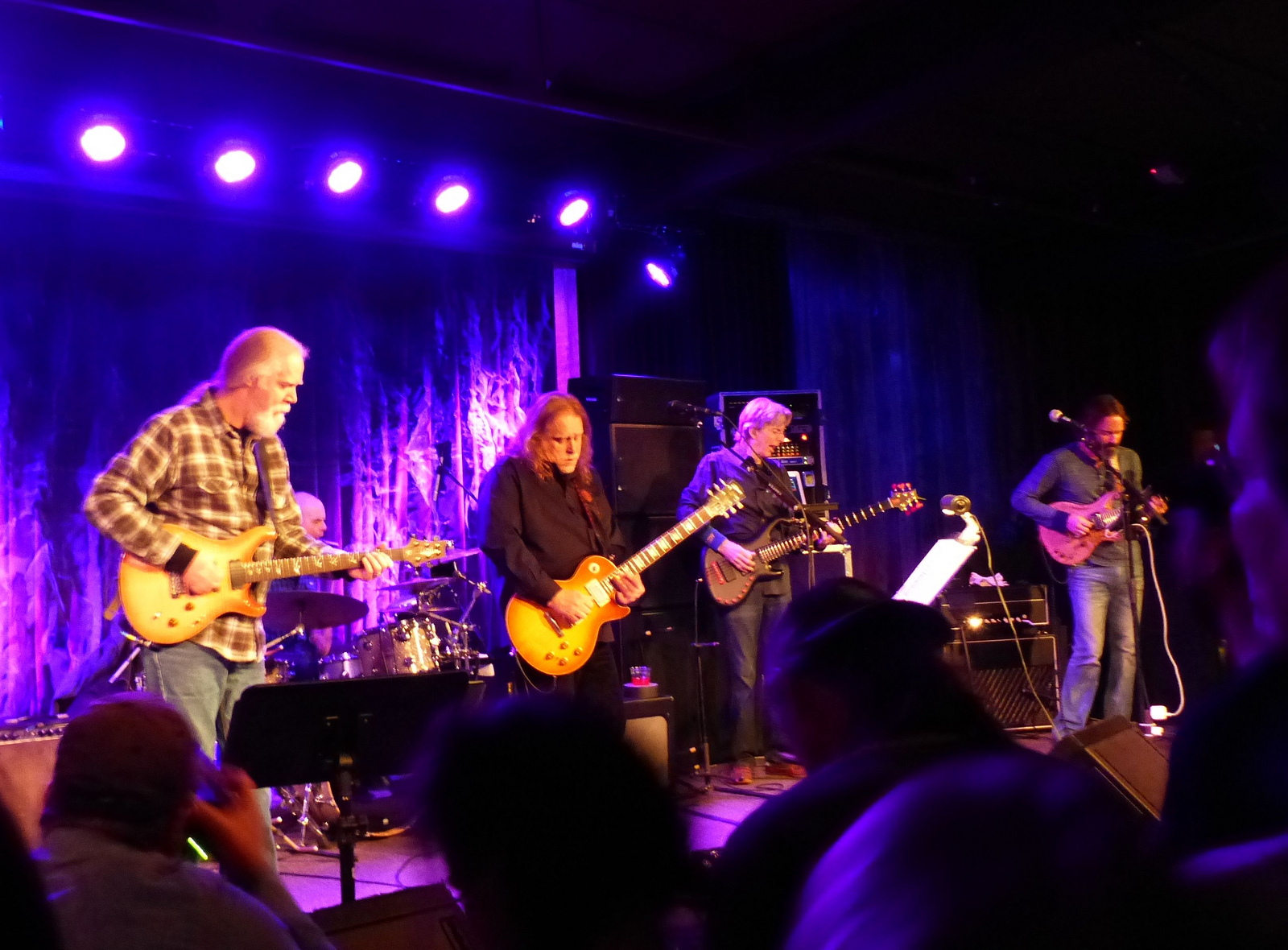
- Phil Lesh & Friends performing at Terrapin Crossroads on December 6 2013; Jimmy Herring, John Molo, Warren Haynes, Phil Lesh, and Neal Casal (left to right)
- Interactive map of Terrapin Crossroads
- Address: San Rafael, California; United States
- Capacity: 419

Construction
- Opened: 2012
- Closed: 2021

Website
- terrapincrossroads.net

Terrapin Crossroads was a music venue, bar, and restaurant active from 2011 until 2021 in San Rafael, California, founded by former Grateful Dead bassist Phil Lesh.

== Concept ==
On March 29, 2011, Phil Lesh posted on a community message board on Furthur.net community. He said that he was planning to open a new live music venue in Marin County across the Golden Gate from San Francisco, in the near future. "We're taking the first steps to make a long time dream-a permanent musical home-come true. We are purchasing a building in Marin, and plan on remodeling it to feel like an old barn; we're calling it Terrapin Landing. We will continue with Furthur while making music at Terrapin Landing when we are at home.

The music will be varied, featuring: Phil Lesh & Friends (continuing the tradition of revolving lineups, including old as well as new friends); West Coast Rambles, based on (and blessed by) Levon Helm's historic Rambles; album night-we pick a favorite album or two to play live; Telstar night-we put together a band for free form improvisation; sing-alongs to monthly Sunday morning gospel music; trivia nights; monthly big band night; [and] seminars with local musicians and artists... Our goal is to create a vibrant community gathering place: beautiful, comfortable, welcoming-for members of the community to commingle and enjoy good music".

== Fairfax proposal ==
In April 2011, Lesh referenced "Terrapin Landing", originally planned as a remodel of The Good Earth natural food store in Fairfax, California, which would be used to host musical fare. However, in July, 2011, the initial plan was changed from using The Good Earth property to a new building in the adjacent lot formerly occupied by a gas station and car repair shop. On August 1 (Jerry Garcia's birthday), formal plans for "Terrapin Crossroads" were submitted to the Fairfax Town Council for approval. The building was designed as a three floor, 16500 square foot structure (8250 square foot footprint) which accommodates about 500 people and hosts 50 to 100 performances each year. Building was to start in the summer of 2012 and be completed by the summer of 2013.

The project had controversy, particularly among the local residents of Fairfax, who were concerned about the potential traffic, noise, trash, loitering, vagrancy, crime, and drugs which the venue could bring to the town of 7300 people (as of 2011). A meeting with a discussion about the venue and a proposal for a traffic study, was scheduled for Wednesday, August 17, 2011. However, the Leshes pulled the topic from the agenda after someone anonymously posted signs reading, "No Terrapin, Please", along Phil's normal morning walking route in his home town of Ross a day or two earlier. The Fairfax Chamber of Commerce hosted a Town Hall meeting on the Terrapin Crossroads project on September 1. Michael Rock, Fairfax's manager, planning director Jim Moore, and Bruce Burman of Jazz Builders, the project manager for the proposed Phil Lesh-backed music venue, made presentations and answered questions. Due to the controversy, the Leshes decided to ponder the situation during the month of September and announce a decision sometime in October.

On November 8, Bruce Burman released a statement from the Leshes: "After careful consideration we have decided not to move forward with Terrapin Crossroads in Fairfax. For all of you that have supported our efforts and helped to define the vision, we are extremely grateful. Phil looks forward to making music and creating a community gathering place sooner rather than later."

== San Rafael location ==
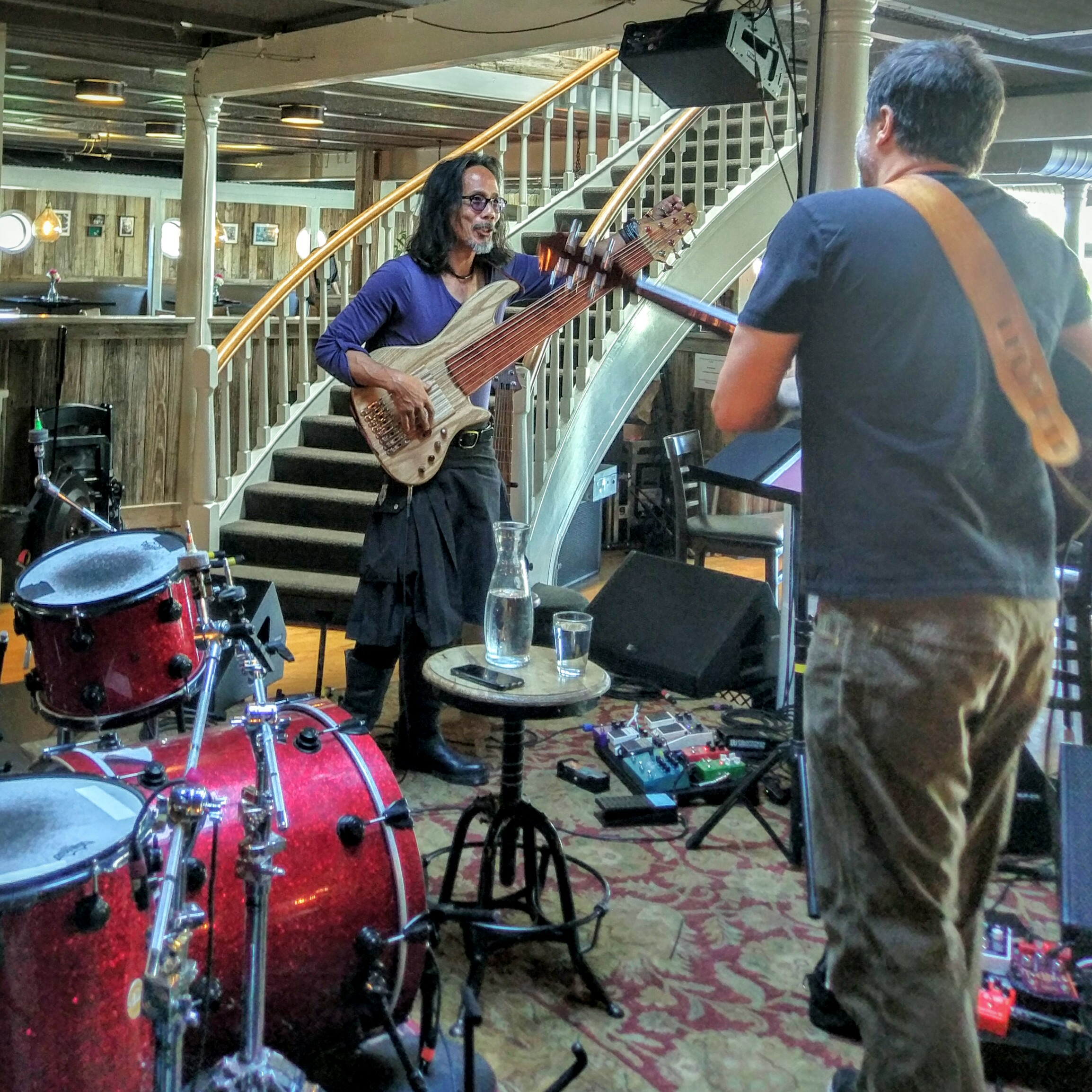
Musicians warming up in the bar at Terrapin Crossroads, July 2016

On January 2, 2012, Lesh announced that Terrapin Crossroads would open at the former location of the Seafood Peddler restaurant in San Rafael. Furthur held rehearsal shows a couple years before 2012 in the Palm Ballroom at the restaurant.

On February 14, 2012, Phil Lesh and Friends performed a live webcast of a one-set performance at their new location. A "soft opening" was held on March 8, 2012. The first official concerts at Terrapin Crossroads were a run of 12 shows by Phil Lesh and Friends from March 17 to April 1, 2012. In addition to the music hall ("The Grate Room"), Terrapin Crossroads consisted of a large bar (the site of many free bar shows), a lounge, and a large dining room on the first floor. The second story has another large lounge/VIP area. Terrapin also had outdoor seating and an outside dining area alongside the canal and docks for people who boated to the restaurant/venue. Terrapin Crossroads was designed by Hulburd Design of San Francisco.

The restaurant portion of the venue was temporarily closed due to the COVID-19 pandemic. In November 2021, Lesh announced Terrapin Crossroads had closed permanently.
