= The Dead (band) =

American rock band composed of some of the former members of the Grateful Dead

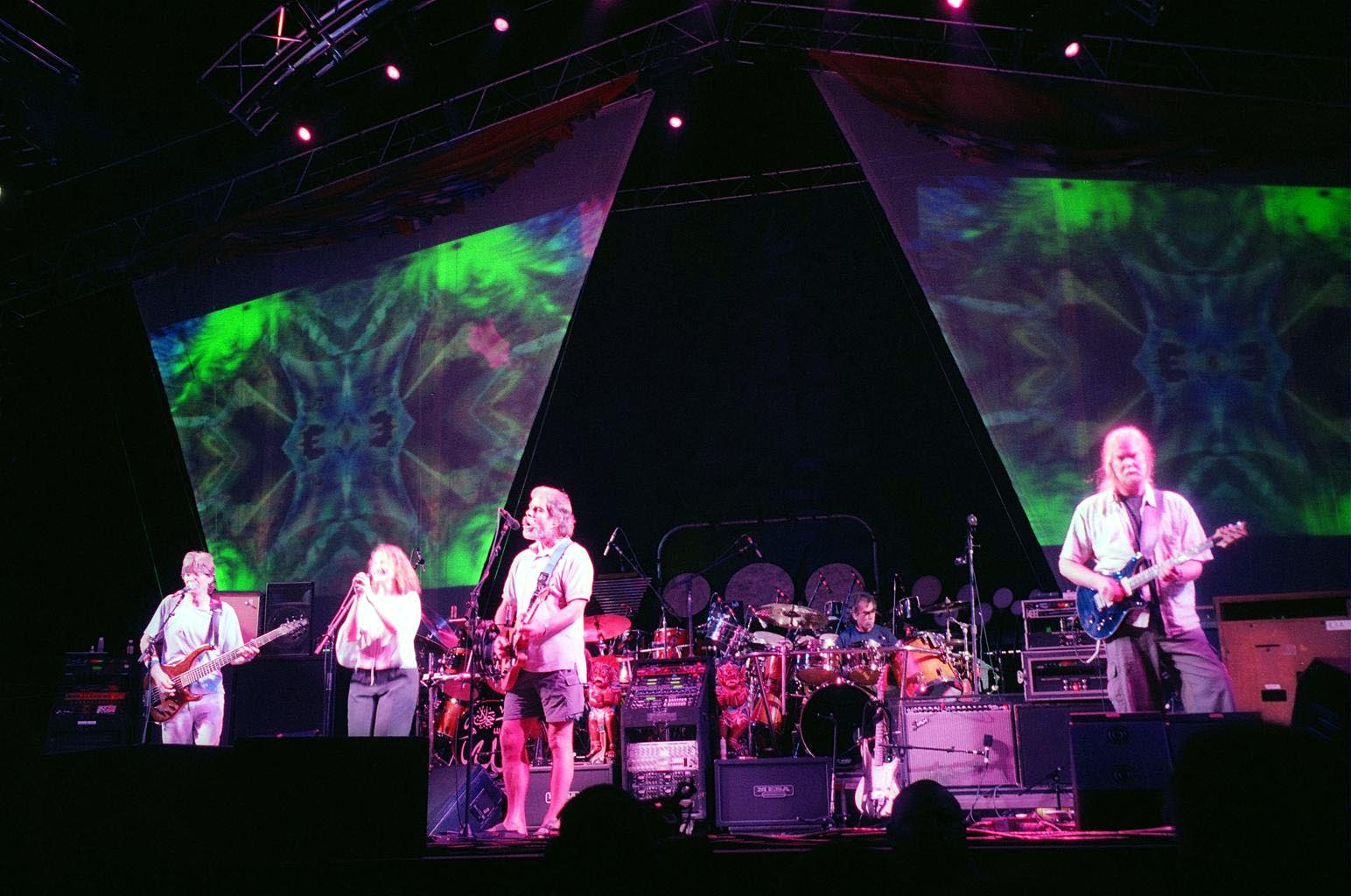
- The Dead performing on June 17, 2003

Background information
- Origin: San Francisco, California, U.S.
- Genres: Rock; psychedelic rock; roots rock; jazz rock; jam band
- Years active: 2003–2004, 2008–2009
- Spinoffs: Furthur
- Spinoff of: Grateful Dead, The Other Ones
- Past members: Bob Weir; Phil Lesh; Mickey Hart; Bill Kreutzmann; Jeff Chimenti; Jimmy Herring; Rob Barraco; Joan Osborne; Warren Haynes
- Website: www.dead.net

The Dead was an American rock band composed of some of the former members of the Grateful Dead along with other musicians that were involved in some capacity with the "Dead Ethos". Throughout "The Dead's" career they had a revolving list of members leaving and joining the band including the former members of the Grateful Dead.

After the death of Jerry Garcia in 1995, Bob Weir, Phil Lesh, Mickey Hart, and Bill Kreutzmann formed the band The Other Ones, performing concert tours in 1998 (without Kreutzmann), 2000 (without Lesh), and 2002, and released one album, The Strange Remain. In 2003, they changed their name to The Dead.

== Tours ==
In addition to Weir, Lesh, Hart and Kreutzmann, the 2003 lineup of the band included Jimmy Herring, Jeff Chimenti, Rob Barraco, and Joan Osborne. The band was first officially billed as The Dead on February 14, 2003 at the Warfield in San Francisco. Later that year, the band opened up their summer tour (titled as "Summer Getaway") on June 15 at the Bonnaroo Music Festival. They ended 2003 with two New Year's dates at the Oakland Arena on December 30 and 31.

In 2004, Herring and Chimenti remained in the lineup, and were joined by Warren Haynes. The band played a brief winter jam and a three-month summer tour called the Wave That Flag Tour. In 2006, guitarist Jimmy Herring joined the group Widespread Panic after George McConnell's departure from the group.

On February 4, 2008, Bob Weir, Phil Lesh, and Mickey Hart, along with several other musicians, performed a concert called "Deadheads for Obama", at the Warfield in San Francisco. On October 13, 2008, Weir, Lesh, Hart and Kreutzmann, joined by Warren Haynes and Jeff Chimenti, played a second show for the Obama campaign, called "Change Rocks", at Penn State University. On January 20, 2009, the same lineup played at one of the ten official balls for the inauguration of President Obama.

The band toured the United States in the spring of 2009, playing 23 concerts in April and May, with a lineup of Bob Weir, Phil Lesh, Bill Kreutzmann, Mickey Hart, Warren Haynes, and Jeff Chimenti. During the second night of the Spring 2009 tour, they were joined on stage by Tipper Gore who sat in on drums during the closing song, "Sugar Magnolia". Over a two-night run in New Jersey in April 2009 they reunited with former Grateful Dead collaborator Branford Marsalis on saxophone. They also headlined the second annual Rothbury Music Festival in Rothbury, Michigan on July 4, 2009.

After the 2009 Dead tour, Bob Weir and Phil Lesh performed together for the next five years with their new band Furthur.

== Personnel ==
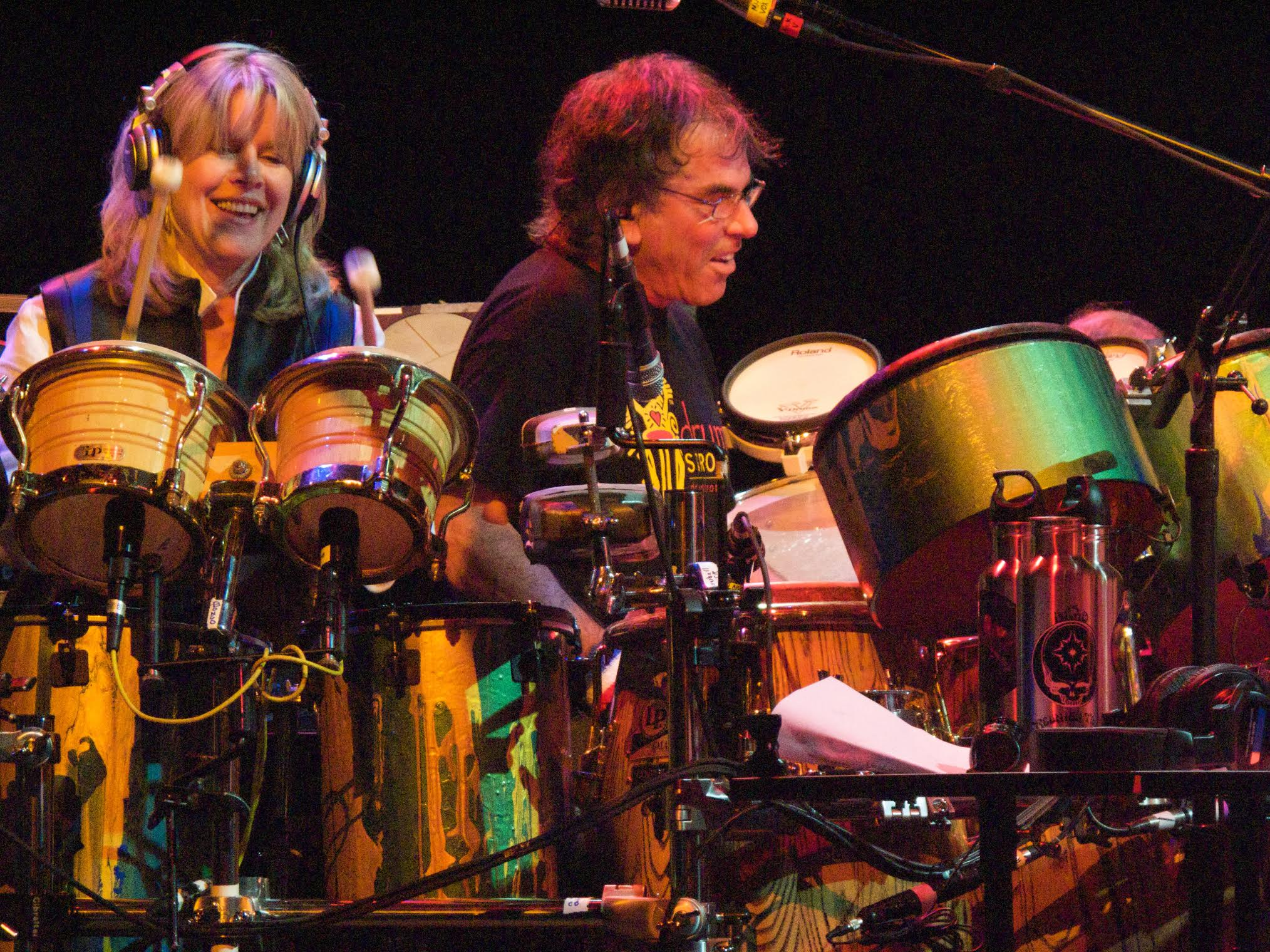
Tipper Gore and Mickey Hart playing drums together during The Dead concert in April 2009

2003	Bob Weir – guitar, vocals; Phil Lesh – bass, vocals; Mickey Hart – drums, vocals; Bill Kreutzmann – drums; Jimmy Herring – guitar; Jeff Chimenti – keyboards, vocals; Rob Barraco – keyboards, vocals; Joan Osborne – vocals
2004	Bob Weir – guitar, vocals; Phil Lesh – bass, vocals; Mickey Hart – drums, vocals; Bill Kreutzmann – drums; Jimmy Herring – guitar; Jeff Chimenti – keyboards, vocals; Warren Haynes – guitar, vocals
2008–2009	Bob Weir – guitar, vocals; Phil Lesh – bass, vocals; Mickey Hart – drums, vocals; Bill Kreutzmann – drums; Jeff Chimenti – keyboards, vocals; Warren Haynes – guitar, vocals
