= Deadheads for Obama =

2008 rock concert

The Deadheads for Obama concert poster

Deadheads for Obama is the name given to the February 4, 2008, reunion concert of three former members of the Grateful Dead at The Warfield in San Francisco. The show, performed one day before the Super Tuesday primary elections, was an act of support for Democratic presidential candidate Barack Obama, and featured former Dead members Phil Lesh, Bob Weir, and Mickey Hart, as well as John Molo, Jackie Greene, Steve Molitz, Mark Karan and Barry Sless.

The show marked the first time Lesh, Weir and Hart had shared the stage since 2004, and was simulcast on the iClips Network.

Deadheads for Obama is also a 350-member grassroots organization founded in February 2007 through Barack Obama's website; one year before the concert of the same namesake. This group collectively raised more than $150,000 for the Obama campaign.

Lesh, whose son was a volunteer for Obama's campaign, is reported to have been the one most involved in organizing the concert.

== Setlist ==
After a videotaped introduction by Barack Obama, the band played "Playing in the Band" into "Brown-Eyed Women", and continued the first set with other Grateful Dead staples "Mississippi Half-Step Uptown Toodeloo", "New Minglewood Blues", and a cover of "Come Together" by the Beatles.

A short speech by Phil Lesh was followed by a four-song acoustic second set, featuring more classic Dead songs like "Friend of the Devil" and "Deal". Then the band plugged in again to play an extended third set, including New Orleans classic "Iko Iko" (in honor of Mardi Gras), and ending with a reprise of the opener, "Playing in the Band", and an encore of "U.S. Blues".

The complete setlist was:

- First set: "Playing in the Band", "Brown-Eyed Women", "Mississippi Half-Step Uptown Toodeloo", "New Minglewood Blues", "Come Together"
- Second set (acoustic): "Deep Elem Blues", "Friend of the Devil", "Deal", "Ripple"
- Third set: "China Cat Sunflower", "The Wheel", "The Other One", "Sugaree", "Eyes of the World", "Throwing Stones", "Iko Iko", "Playing in the Band" reprise
- Encore: "U.S. Blues"

== Change Rocks ==
Hart, Lesh, and Weir reunited again in support of the Obama presidential campaign, this time joined by Bill Kreutzmann, on October 13, 2008, in the Bryce Jordan Center at Penn State University, playing a concert called "Change Rocks". Warren Haynes provided guitar and vocal support for the reunion, and Jeff Chimenti played keyboards. The performance was preceded by a set of music by members of the Allman Brothers Band.

The set list was: "Truckin'", "U.S. Blues", "Help on the Way", "Slipknot!", "Franklin's Tower", "Playing in the Band", "Dark Star", "St. Stephen", "Unbroken Chain", "The Other One", "Throwing Stones", and "Playing in the Band" reprise, with an encore of "Touch of Grey" and "Not Fade Away"

== Presidential inauguration ball ==
On January 20, 2009, the Dead played at one of the 10 official balls for the Inauguration of President Barack Obama. Their sets were immediately followed by an appearance by President Barack Obama and the First Lady; Vice President Joe Biden and Second Lady Jill Biden appeared during a set break.

== See also ==
- Barack Obama presidential campaign, 2008
- List of Barack Obama presidential campaign endorsements, 2008
- Reunions of the Grateful Dead
