= Phil Lesh =

American musician (1940–2024)

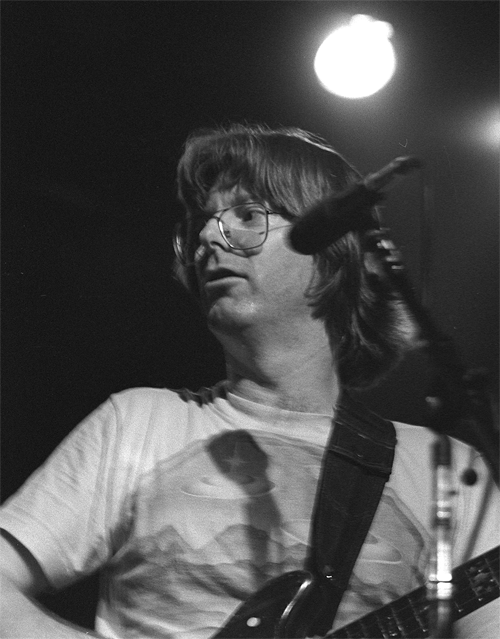
- Lesh performing in 1976

Background information
- Born: Philip Chapman Lesh; March 15, 1940; Berkeley, California, U.S.
- Died: October 25, 2024 (aged 84)
- Genres: Rock; psychedelia; jam; jazz; country; classical
- Occupations: Musician; songwriter
- Instruments: Bass guitar; trumpet; vocals
- Years active: 1960–2024
- Labels: Warner Bros.; Grateful Dead Records; Arista; Columbia
- Formerly of: Grateful Dead; The Other Ones; The Dead; Furthur; Phil Lesh and Friends
- Website: phillesh.net

Philip Chapman Lesh (March 15, 1940 – October 25, 2024) was an American musician and a founding member of the Grateful Dead, with whom he developed a unique style of improvised six-string bass guitar. He was their bassist throughout their 30-year career.

After the group disbanded in 1995, Lesh continued the tradition of Grateful Dead family music with a side project, Phil Lesh and Friends, which paid homage to the Dead's music by playing their repertoire, as well as songs by members of his own group. Lesh operated a music venue called Terrapin Crossroads. From 2009 to 2014, he performed in Furthur alongside former Grateful Dead bandmate Bob Weir. He scaled back touring in 2014 but continued to perform concerts.

== Background ==
Lesh was born in Berkeley, California, on March 15, 1940, the only child of Frank Lesh, an amateur piano player, and Barbra Chapman. His father encouraged him to take up the violin at the age of eight. At El Cerrito High School in East Bay, he became a member of the school's marching band.

While enrolled at Berkeley High School he switched to trumpet and participated in the school's music-related extracurricular activities. He studied the instrument under Bob Hansen, conductor of the symphonic Golden Gate Park Band, and became interested in avant-garde classical music and free jazz. By his mid-teens, inspired by Beethoven and Charles Ives, he had decided that he wanted to be a composer.

Lesh enrolled at the College of San Mateo, where he wrote arrangements for the community college's big band and played trumpet. After transferring with sophomore standing to the University of California, Berkeley in 1961, he befriended future Grateful Dead keyboardist Tom Constanten. At Constanten's suggestion, he studied under the Italian modernist Luciano Berio in a graduate-level course at Mills College in the spring of 1962, where their classmates included Steve Reich and Stanford University cross-registrant John Chowning.

While volunteering for radio station KPFA as a recording engineer, Lesh met bluegrass banjo player Jerry Garcia. He invited Garcia to perform on the station's Midnight Special show, and despite their different musical interests they became friends. Lesh briefly worked in the Post Office Department, where he drove a service truck. In spring 1965 he saw Garcia's new band, the Warlocks, in concert, and was impressed. A few weeks later Garcia invited him to become the group's bassist. This was unexpected, as Lesh had never played bass guitar. According to Lesh, the first song he rehearsed with the band was "I Know You Rider". He joined them for their third or fourth gig (memories vary) and stayed until the end.

The group changed its name to the Grateful Dead and began playing at Ken Kesey's Acid Test parties (LSD then being legal in California). In late 1966 Lesh moved with the group to San Francisco, where they were signed to a recording deal with Warner Brothers, and found himself playing at venues such as The Fillmore and the Avalon Ballroom. As Lesh had never before played bass he learned "on the job", which meant he had no preconceived ideas about the instrument's traditional role in the rhythm section and was free to develop his own style. In his autobiography, he credited Jack Casady (the bassist in Jefferson Airplane) as an influence on the direction in which his instincts were taking him. He said that his playing style was influenced more by Bach's counterpoint than by contemporaneous rock and soul bass players. He also cited Jack Bruce of Cream as an influence.

== Music ==
Lesh became an innovator in the new role that the electric bass was developing during the mid-1960s. Contemporary bass players such as Jack Casady, Jack Bruce, James Jamerson, and Paul McCartney had adopted a more melodic, contrapuntal approach to the instrument. Before this, bass players in rock had generally played a conventional timekeeping role within the beat of the song, within (or underpinning) the song's harmonic or chord structure. While not abandoning these elements, Lesh went on his own improvised excursions during a song or instrumental, and in the group's long improvised jams in their live performances Lesh's six-string bass complemented Garcia's guitar solos with cascades of notes and unusual time signatures. This became a characteristic part of the so-called San Francisco Sound in the new rock music.

Early on, Lesh grasped the sonic possibilities presented by recording in the studio, and his style of playing often led to complaints by the band's record label. Joe Smith of Warner Bros. wrote a letter about cost overruns that had accumulated during studio sessions for the band's second album, Anthem of the Sun (1968). According to music critic Stephen Thomas Erlewine, Smith singled him out as "the catalyst for chaos within the band", writing: "It's apparent that nobody in your organization has enough influence over Phil Lesh to evoke anything resembling normal behavior." Lesh was not a prolific composer or singer with the Grateful Dead, though he did occasionally make contributions such as the opening track on American Beauty, "Box of Rain". He co-wrote several of the band's best-known compositions, including "Truckin'", "St. Stephen", "The Eleven" and "Dark Star". His high tenor voice contributed to the Grateful Dead's three-part harmony sections in their group vocals in the early days of the band, until he largely relinquished singing high parts to Donna Godchaux (and subsequently Brent Mydland and Vince Welnick) in 1974 because of vocal cord damage from improper singing technique. In the early 80s, he resumed singing lead vocals on songs closer to his natural vocal range.

Lesh introduced his bandmates to the aural explorations of the jazz saxophonist John Coltrane. All of the band's shows were recorded by Deadhead tapers, and it became possible to listen to any given performance from 1972 or 1974 and hear the Grateful Dead interpreting the musical innovations that Lesh stimulated through Coltrane's influence. Throughout the Dead's career, his interest in jazz avant-garde music remained a crucial influence on the group. He later introduced the band to composer Charles Ives, which created their ability to go spontaneously from a discordant jam into a blues or country song. In the 30 years between 1965 and 1995 Lesh played almost 2,500 concerts with the Grateful Dead, many of them lasting for up to six hours.

Lesh collaborated with Owsley "Bear" Stanley, the Dead's onetime sound engineer (and former source of LSD) in designing the Wall of Sound, an enormous sound reinforcement system they used for forty-odd shows in the 1974 tour. After two years of problem-solving and planning, the forty-foot high Wall of Sound was first used publicly at the Cow Palace in San Francisco on March 23, 1974. With nine independent channels, the powerful system contained 604 speakers driven by 26,400 watts of power. Lesh compared playing through the system to "piloting a flying saucer. Or riding your own sound wave". According to Lesh, Owsley persuaded the Dead to record every one of their shows, emphasizing the necessity of listening to the tapes.

In 1994, Lesh was inducted into The Rock and Roll Hall of Fame as a member of the Grateful Dead.

== Post-Grateful Dead ==
After the Grateful Dead disbanded, Lesh continued to play the band's music in concert with its offshoots The Other Ones and The Dead and to promote San Francisco hippy philosophy, as well as performing with his own band, Phil Lesh and Friends. In 1999 and 2000, he co-headlined two tours with Bob Dylan.

Lesh published his autobiography, Searching for the Sound: My Life with the Grateful Dead in 2005. In 2009, he went on tour with the remaining members of the Grateful Dead. After the 2009 summer tour, Lesh formed a new band with Bob Weir named Furthur which debuted in September 2009.

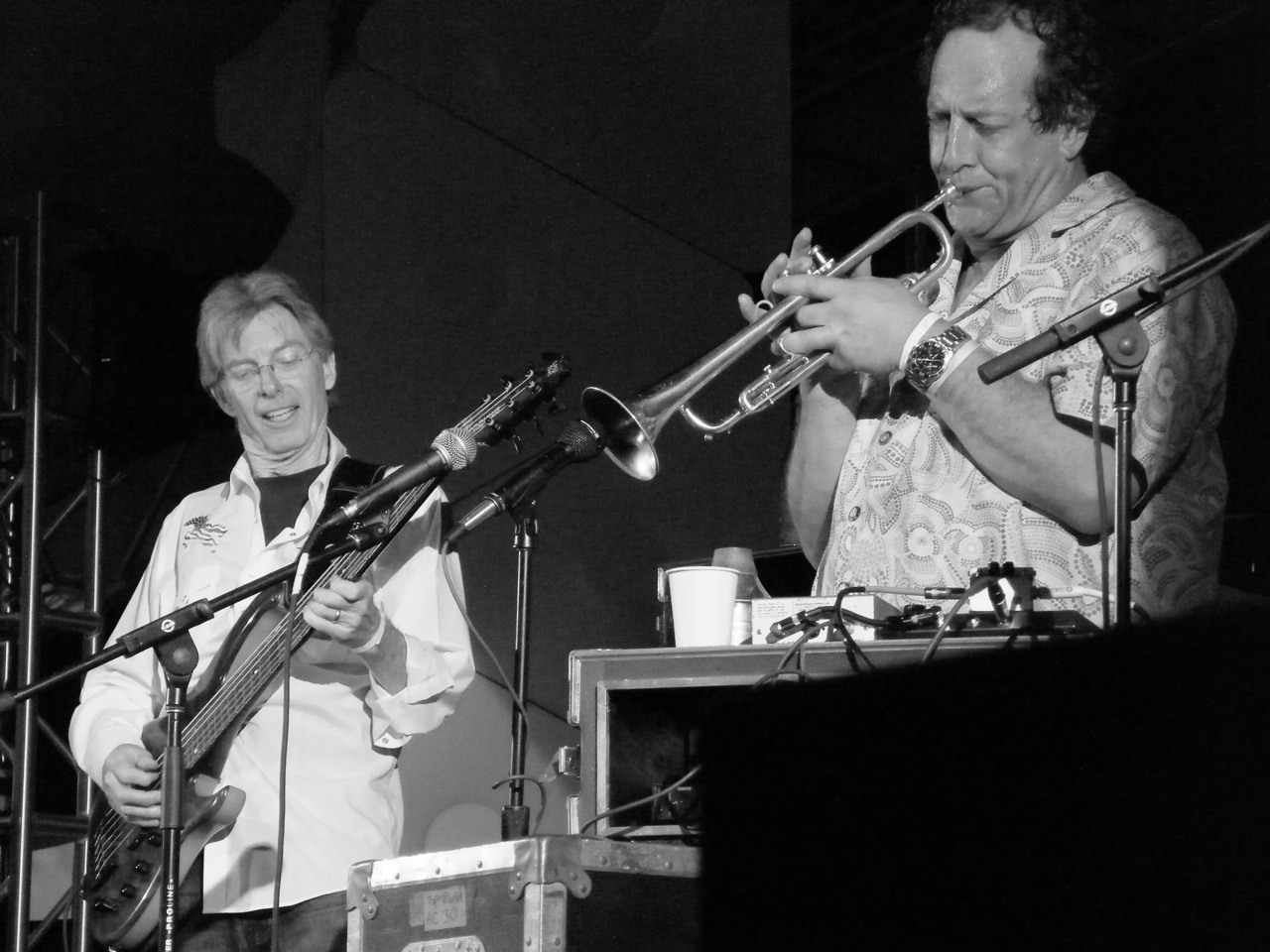
Lesh (left) performing as Telstar in 2008

In 2012, Lesh founded a music venue called Terrapin Crossroads, in San Rafael, California. The venue officially opened on March 8, 2012, with a first of a run of twelve concerts by Phil Lesh and Friends. When not on tour, Lesh's sons, Grahame and Brian, served as the house band at Terrapin Crossroads. In addition to songs from the Dead catalog, Lesh played material by Mumford & Sons, Zac Brown Band and other contemporary acts with his sons. Terrapin Crossroads closed in November 2021 when their lease on the property expired.

Lesh began performing again with Phil Lesh and Friends in 2012. Furthur disbanded in early 2014 and, at age 74, Lesh ceased touring full time. Thereafter he performed regularly at Terrapin Crossroads with various Phil Lesh and Friends lineups as well as with the Terrapin Family Band. In the early 2010s he performed select shows at venues throughout the United States, notably the Capitol Theatre in Port Chester, New York, as well as at festivals. He took part in the 2015 Fare Thee Well concerts, and a short North American tour with Bob Weir in the spring of 2018. In 2020, Rolling Stone ranked him as the 11th greatest bass player. In March 2023, he celebrated his 83rd birthday and hundredth show at the Capitol Theatre.

== Personal life, health and death ==
Lesh married Jill Johnstone, a waitress from the cafe next door to the Grateful Dead's office in San Rafael. They had two sons, Grahame and Brian, both of whom became musicians and played with their father in the Terrapin Family Band. They frequently played together, both publicly and in private. They performed in an annual benefit concert group known as Philharmonia, dating from 1997, including on December 18, 2011 at a Christmas gig which included Bob Weir and Jackie Greene at the Tenderloin Middle School cafeteria attended by 250 people.

Lesh and his wife administered their charitable organization, the Unbroken Chain Foundation.

Lesh had a lifelong interest in the occult and was a member of the Research Into Lost Knowledge organisation.

In 1998, Lesh underwent a liver transplant as a result of a chronic hepatitis C infection. Cody was the name of the organ donor. Six months before Cody died, he told his mother that if anything happened to him, he wanted to donate his organs. At all of his live concerts from 1999 onwards, Lesh asked his audience to become organ donors. This was known as the Rap. In 2015, for example, he told the crowd "I'm only alive today because a man named Cody decided he wanted to be an organ donor. And he did it in the simplest way possible: He turned to someone who loved him and he loved, and said, 'Hey, if anything happens to me, I'd like to be an organ donor.'"

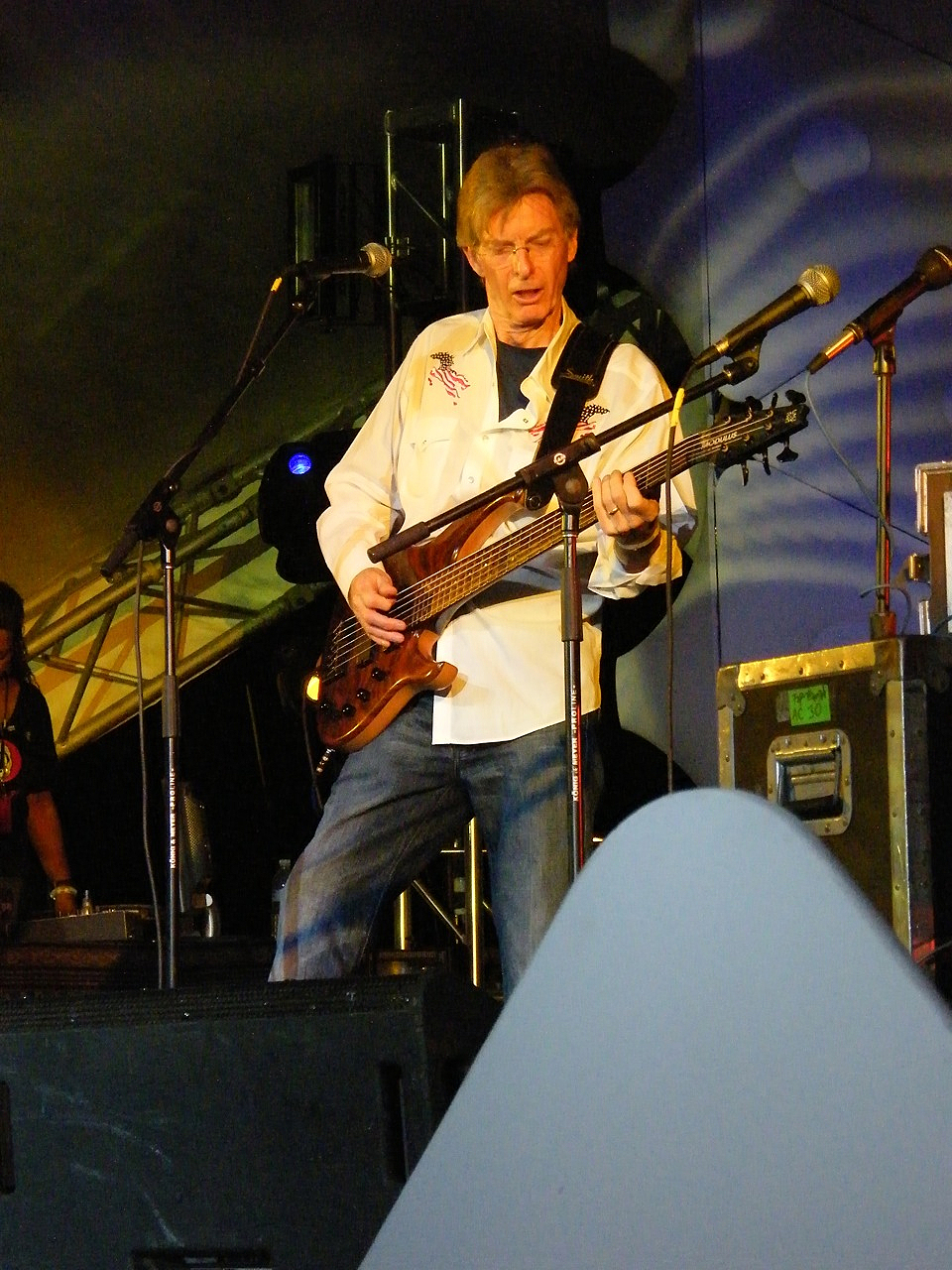
Lesh performing in May 2008

On October 26, 2006, Lesh stated on his official website that he had been diagnosed with prostate cancer, the disease that killed his father, and would be undergoing an operation in December 2006. On December 7, 2006, he reported that he had undergone prostate surgery and the cancer had been removed. In October 2015, Lesh announced that he had had bladder cancer surgery. He stated that his prognosis was good and that he expected to make a full recovery.

In August 2019, Lesh announced that he was to undergo back surgery and he and his band canceled engagements at the Outlaw Music Festival, Telluride Blues & Brews Festival, and Dirt Farmers Festival. He was expected to make a full recovery.

Lesh died on October 25, 2024, at the age of 84. No cause of death was given publicly.

== Memorials and Tributes ==
Following his death, in honor of Lesh's 85th birthday the village of Port Chester, New York, where Lesh frequently performed at The Capitol Theatre, renamed a portion of the street outside the venue as "Phil Lesh Lane". Lesh’s deep musical ties to the village had previously been recognized over the years: he received the Key to Port Chester and was named an Honorary Firefighter by the Port Chester Volunteer Fire Department.

March 12th to 15th, 2025, Phil's son Grahame Lesh hosted Unbroken Chain: A Celebration of the Life and Music of Phil Lesh at The Capitol Theatre. The show featured over 30 performers, including Daniel Donato, Luther Dickinson, John Molo, Oteil Burbridge, Amy Helm, Dave Schools, Stanley Jordan, Larry Campbell, Teresa Williams, Rick Mitarotonda and more.

== Discography ==
The Other Ones:

- The Strange Remain (1999)

Phil Lesh and Friends:

- Love Will See You Through (1999)
- There and Back Again (2002)
- Live at the Warfield (2006)
