= In the Court of the Crimson King (box set) =

Box set by King Crimson
- Released: 2010
- Genres: Progressive rock, Heavy metal
- Labels: Discipline Global Mobile; Panegyric; Inner Knot
- Producer: King Crimson

King Crimson chronology
In the Court of the Crimson King (2010)	Larks' Tongues in Aspic (2012)

In the Court of the Crimson King is the first of the major box set releases from English progressive rock group King Crimson, released in 2010 by Discipline Global Mobile & Panegyric Records. The set features recordings from the band's initial lineup and the sessions for their 1969 debut album In the Court of the Crimson King, including several mixes of the album. Containing 5 CDs, 1 DVD, copious sleeve notes and replica memorabilia, In the Court of the Crimson King covers the genesis of King Crimson.

In 2020, this box set was superseded by the release of The Complete 1969 Recordings, which includes all known live recordings from this era of King Crimson, as well as the complete studio sessions for the album In the Court of the Crimson King. Additionally, it includes material from Giles, Giles, and Fripp, the group which later evolved into King Crimson.

== Track listing ==
In the Court of the Crimson King, Disc 1
No.	Title	Writer(s)	Length
1.	"21st Century Schizoid Man" (2009 remix)	Robert Fripp, Ian McDonald, Greg Lake, Michael Giles, Peter Sinfield	7:24
2.	"I Talk to the Wind" (2009 remix)	McDonald, Sinfield	6:00
3.	"Epitaph" (2009 remix)	Fripp, McDonald, Lake, Giles, Sinfield	8:52
4.	"Moonchild" (Edited version; 2009 remix)	Fripp, McDonald, Lake, Giles, Sinfield	9:02
5.	"The Court of the Crimson King" (2009 remix)	McDonald, Sinfield	9:20
6.	"Moonchild" (Full version; 2009 remix)		12:13
7.	"I Talk to the Wind" (Duo version)		4:54
8.	"I Talk to the Wind" (Alternate mix)		6:34
9.	"Epitaph" (Backing track)		9:02
10.	"Wind Session"	n/a	4:28
Total length:			1:17:49

In the Court of the Crimson King, Disc 2
No.	Title	Length
1.	"21st Century Schizoid Man" (2004 remaster)	7:23
2.	"I Talk to the Wind" (2004 remaster)	6:03
3.	"Epitaph" (2004 remaster)	8:48
4.	"Moonchild" (2004 remaster)	12:12
5.	"The Court of the Crimson King" (2004 remaster)	9:25
6.	"21st Century Schizoid Man" (Instrumental)	6:46
7.	"I Talk to the Wind" (BBC session)	4:40
8.	"21st Century Schizoid Man" (BBC session)	7:11
9.	"The Court of the Crimson King (Part 1)" (Mono single version)	3:22
10.	"The Court of the Crimson King (Part 2)" (Mono single version)	4:30
Total length:		1:10:20

In the Court of the Crimson King, Disc 3 ("The Alternate Album" (1–5) and original pink label UK vinyl transfer (6–10))
No.	Title	Length
1.	"21st Century Schizoid Man" (Instrumental trio version)	7:07
2.	"I Talk to the Wind" (Studio run-through)	4:20
3.	"Epitaph" (Alternate version)	9:27
4.	"Moonchild" (Take 1)	2:20
5.	"The Court of the Crimson King" (Take 3)	7:14
6.	"21st Century Schizoid Man"	7:21
7.	"I Talk to the Wind"	6:03
8.	"Epitaph"	8:56
9.	"Moonchild"	12:12
10.	"The Court of the Crimson King"	9:22
Total length:		1:14:22

In the Court of the Crimson King, Disc 4 (Live)
No.	Title	Writer(s)	Length
1.	"21st Century Schizoid Man" (recorded live at Hyde Park, London, England, 5 July 1969)		6:36
2.	"The Court of the Crimson King" (recorded live at Hyde Park, London, England, 5 July 1969)		6:31
3.	"Get Thy Bearings" (recorded live at Hyde Park, London, England, 5 July 1969)	Donovan Leitch	9:41
4.	"Epitaph" (recorded live at Hyde Park, London, England, 5 July 1969)		4:28
5.	"Mantra" (recorded live at Hyde Park, London, England, 5 July 1969)	Fripp, McDonald, Lake, Giles, Sinfield	3:04
6.	"Travel Weary Capricorn" (recorded live at Hyde Park, London, England, 5 July 1969)	Fripp, McDonald, Lake, Giles, Sinfield	5:37
7.	"Mars" (recorded live at Hyde Park, London, England, 5 July 1969)	Gustav Holst	3:30
8.	"The Court of the Crimson King" (recorded live at Fillmore East, New York City, New York, November 1969)		7:52
9.	"A Man, a City" (recorded live at Fillmore East, New York City, New York, November 1969)	Fripp, McDonald, Lake, Giles, Sinfield	12:19
10.	"Epitaph" (recorded live at Fillmore East, New York City, New York, November 1969)		8:31
11.	"21st Century Schizoid Man" (recorded live at Fillmore East, New York City, New York, November 1969)		7:56
Total length:			1:09:34

In the Court of the Crimson King, Disc 5 (US mono radio mixes)
No.	Title	Length
1.	"21st Century Schizoid Man"	7:22
2.	"I Talk to the Wind"	6:04
3.	"Epitaph"	8:51
4.	"Moonchild"	12:12
5.	"The Court of the Crimson King" (Mono Album Mix)	9:27
6.	"The Court of the Crimson King" (Edited Mono Single Mix)	2:19
Total length:		46:15

In the Court of the Crimson King, Disc 6 (DVD Audio - various)
No.	Title	Length
1.	"21st Century Schizoid Man" (2009 5.1 Surround Mix)	7:24
2.	"I Talk to the Wind" (2009 5.1 Surround Mix)	6:00
3.	"Epitaph" (2009 5.1 Surround Mix)	8:52
4.	"Moonchild" (2009 5.1 Surround Mix)	9:02
5.	"The Court of the Crimson King" (2009 5.1 Surround Mix)	9:20
6.	"21st Century Schizoid Man" (2009 Stereo Mix)	7:24
7.	"I Talk to the Wind" (2009 Stereo Mix)	6:00
8.	"Epitaph" (2009 Stereo Mix)	8:52
9.	"Moonchild" (2009 Stereo Mix)	9:02
10.	"The Court of the Crimson King" (2009 Stereo Mix)	9:20
11.	"21st Century Schizoid Man" (Original Master Edition 2004)	7:23
12.	"I Talk to the Wind" (Original Master Edition 2004)	6:03
13.	"Epitaph" (Original Master Edition 2004)	8:48
14.	"Moonchild" (Original Master Edition 2004)	12:12
15.	"The Court of the Crimson King" (Original Master Edition 2004)	9:25
16.	"Moonchild" (Full version)	12:13
17.	"I Talk to the Wind" (Duo Version)	4:54
18.	"I Talk to the Wind" (Alternate Mix)	6:34
19.	"Epitaph" (Backing Track)	9:02
20.	"Wind Session"	4:28
21.	"21st Century Schizoid Man" (The Alternate Album - Instrumental)	7:07
22.	"I Talk to the Wind" (The Alternate Album - Studio Run Through)	4:20
23.	"Epitaph" (The Alternate Album - Alternate Version)	9:27
24.	"Moonchild" (The Alternate Album - Take 1)	2:20
25.	"The Court of the Crimson King" (The Alternate Album - Take 3)	7:14
26.	"21st Century Schizoid Man" (Video Content Edit)

== Personnel ==
King Crimson

- Robert Fripp – electric guitar, acoustic guitar
- Ian McDonald – alto saxophone, flute, clarinet, bass clarinet, vibraphone, Mellotron Mk II, reed organ, piano, harpsichord, vocals
- Greg Lake – bass guitar, lead vocals
- Michael Giles – drums, percussion, vocals
- Peter Sinfield – words & illumination
