= Dick's Picks Volume 20 =

Live album by Grateful Dead
- Released: January 23, 2001
- Recorded: September 25 & 28, 1976
- Genres: Rock, jam, folk rock
- Length: 5:06:09
- Label: Grateful Dead Records

Grateful Dead chronology
Ladies and Gentlemen... the Grateful Dead (2000)	Dick's Picks Volume 20 (2001)	Dick's Picks Volume 21 (2001)

Professional ratings
Review scores
Source	Rating
Allmusic	3/5 stars
The Music Box	4/5 stars
Rolling Stone	2/5 stars

Dick's Picks Volume 20 is a four-CD live album by the rock band the Grateful Dead. It was recorded on September 25, 1976 at the Capital Centre in Landover, Maryland and September 28, 1976 at the Onondaga County War Memorial in Syracuse, New York. It was released on January 23, 2001. The concerts are complete except for "It's All Over Now" from September 25 and "Bertha" from September 28 – though both songs were played both nights and so are represented on the album.

Dick's Picks Volume 20 was mastered in HDCD from the original recordings by Dan Healy. The recordings are from a period when the band was transitioning out of their long touring hiatus, trying out new songs on the road, and welcoming back second drummer Mickey Hart. The last performance of the song "Cosmic Charlie" is on this installment.

== Enclosure ==
The release includes two sheets of paper stapled together in the middle, yielding an eight-page enclosure. The front duplicates the cover of the CD and the back features a circular outline of a stealie skull in red over a color photograph of a path in the woods extending into the distance.

The first two pages feature a collage consisting of a ticket stub for the September 28th show and a fan letter from "A Dead Head" along with three black-and-white photographs of Jerry Garcia, Phil Lesh with Donna Jean Godchaux, and Bob Weir. The fan letter states that its author has "always felt it to be unfair to force Dead Heads to turn to illegitimate & poor quality bootlegs" and suggests the band "put out a line of recordings of your concerts." Behind these items is a background photo of the orange leaves of a maple tree in autumn.

The middle two pages feature a photomontage of three color photographs of Keith Godchaux, Bill Kreutzmann with Mickey Hart, and the entire band on stage with a grey-ish background containing a blurry wing. The last two pages list the contents of and credits for the release, against a background containing a dark blue photograph of a crescent moon at the bottom of the second page.

== Track listing ==
Disc 1

September 25, 1976 – Capital Centre, Landover, Maryland – first set:

1. "Bertha" (Jerry Garcia, Robert Hunter) – 5:27
2. "New Minglewood Blues" (Noah Lewis) – 4:49
3. "Ramble On Rose" (Garcia, Hunter) – 7:11
4. "Cassidy" (Bob Weir, John Perry Barlow) – 4:43
5. "Brown-Eyed Women" (Garcia, Hunter) – 4:56
6. "Mama Tried" (Merle Haggard) – 2:49
7. "Peggy-O" (traditional, arranged by Grateful Dead) – 9:41
8. "Loser" (Garcia, Hunter) – 8:18
9. "Let It Grow" (Weir, Barlow) – 12:26
10. "Sugaree" (Garcia, Hunter) – 11:01 (Note: Approximately 11.5 seconds of the beginning edited with a patch from another performance)

September 25, 1976 – Capital Centre, Landover, Maryland – second set:

11. "Lazy Lightning" -> (Weir, Barlow) – 2:53
12. "Supplication" (Weir, Barlow) – 4:37

Disc 2

September 25, 1976 – Capital Centre, Landover, Maryland – second set, continued:

1. "Mississippi Half-Step Uptown Toodeloo" (Garcia, Hunter) – 11:28 (Note: Edited with a patch from the October 9, 1976 performance featured on Dick's Picks Volume 33)
2. "Dancing in the Street" -> (Marvin Gaye, Ivy Jo Hunter, William "Mickey" Stevenson) – 12:43
3. "Cosmic Charlie" (Garcia, Hunter) – 8:39
4. "Scarlet Begonias" (Garcia, Hunter) – 11:07
5. "St. Stephen" -> (Garcia, Phil Lesh, Hunter) – 4:12
6. "Not Fade Away" -> (Norman Petty, Charles Hardin) – 9:57 (Note: Edited with a patch from another performance)
7. "Drums" -> (Mickey Hart, Bill Kreutzmann) – 3:34
8. "Jam" -> (Grateful Dead) – 2:05
9. "St. Stephen" -> (Garcia, Lesh, Hunter) – 2:03
10. "Sugar Magnolia" (Weir, Hunter) – 9:40

Disc 3

September 28, 1976 – Onondaga County War Memorial, Syracuse, New York – first set:

1. "Cold Rain and Snow" (traditional, arranged by Grateful Dead) – 6:36
2. "Big River" (Johnny Cash) – 5:55
3. "Cassidy" (Weir, Barlow) – 4:33
4. "Tennessee Jed" (Garcia, Hunter) – 8:37
5. "New Minglewood Blues" (Lewis) – 6:06
6. "Candyman" (Garcia, Hunter) – 7:25
7. "It's All Over Now" (Bobby Womack, Shirley Jean Womack) – 6:40
8. "Friend of the Devil" (Garcia, John Dawson, Hunter) – 8:44
9. "Let It Grow" -> (Weir, Barlow) – 11:41
10. "Goin' Down the Road Feeling Bad" (traditional, arranged by Grateful Dead) – 9:14

Disc 4

September 28, 1976 – Onondaga County War Memorial, Syracuse, New York – second set:

1. "Playing in the Band" -> (Weir, Hart, Hunter) – 10:40
2. "The Wheel" -> (Garcia, Hunter) – 7:07 (Note: Contains a patch from the October 1, 1976 performance in Indianapolis)
3. "Samson and Delilah" -> (traditional, arranged by Grateful Dead) – 8:01
4. "Jam" -> (Grateful Dead) – 5:40
5. "Comes a Time" -> (Garcia, Hunter) – 7:50
6. "Drums" -> (Hart, Kreutzmann) – 4:58
7. "Eyes of the World" -> (Garcia, Hunter) – 8:39
8. "Orange Tango Jam" -> (Grateful Dead) – 4:46
9. "Dancing in the Street" -> (Gaye, I.J. Hunter, Stevenson) – 9:15 (Note: Edited version with second verse excised)
10. "Playing in the Band" (Weir, Hart, Hunter) – 5:06

September 28, 1976 – Onondaga County War Memorial, Syracuse, New York – encore:

11. "Johnny B. Goode" (Chuck Berry) – 4:33

== Personnel ==
Grateful Dead

- Jerry Garcia – guitar, vocals
- Bob Weir – guitar, vocals
- Phil Lesh – bass
- Keith Godchaux – keyboards, vocals
- Donna Jean Godchaux – vocals
- Bill Kreutzmann – drums
- Mickey Hart – drums

Production

- Live recording: Dan Healy
- CD mastering: Jeffrey Norman
- Tape archivists: Dick Latvala, David Lemieux
- Archival research: Eileen Law / Grateful Dead Archives
- Photography: Ed Perlstein
- Cover art and design: Tina Carpenter
- Cover photos: David DeNoma
- Special thanks: Bob Minkin
