= Might As Well =

Might As Well is the title of multiple pieces of music, including:

- "Might As Well (Future song)", a track from the 2017 album Future by Future
- "Might As Well (The Grateful Dead song)", a piece from multiple releases by the Grateful Dead after 2004
- "Might As Well (The Raspberries song)," a track from the 1972 album Fresh by the Raspberries

== See also ==
- Might As Well Be Dead
- "Might As Well Dance"
