= Dave's Picks Volume 12 =

Live album by Grateful Dead
- Released: November 1, 2014
- Recorded: November 4, 1977
- Genre: Rock
- Length: 233:12
- Label: Rhino
- Producer: Grateful Dead

Grateful Dead chronology
Wake Up to Find Out (2014)	Dave's Picks Volume 12 (2014)	Houston, Texas 11-18-1972 (2014)

Dave's Picks Volume 12 is a three-CD live album by the rock band the Grateful Dead. It contains the complete concert recorded on November 4, 1977 at Colgate University in Hamilton, New York. It was produced as a limited edition of 14,000 numbered copies, and was released by Rhino Records on November 1, 2014. The album also includes over 75 minutes of bonus tracks recorded on November 2, 1977 at a concert at Seneca College in Toronto.

The album Dick's Picks Volume 34 was recorded on November 5, 1977—the night after Dave's Picks Volume 12—at the Community War Memorial in Rochester, New York. That album also includes extensive bonus material from the November 2 Seneca College concert.

== Critical reception ==
Professional ratings
Review scores
Source	Rating
All About Jazz	4/5 stars

On All About Jazz, Doug Collette said, "Betty Cantor-Jackson's [recording] work is always redolent of a realism in the Dead's mix of instruments and it's further tribute to engineer Jeffrey Norman that he preserves that quality through the HDCD mastering.... No frayed or loose ends are apparent in the music, which the Grateful Dead parlay with a radiant confidence befitting their success on stage earlier in the year. Such virtue certainly isn't uncommon in the group's discography, only rare in that it is so robust throughout in this set."

On AllMusic, Fred Thomas wrote, "[The album] documents this spirited, fun [concert] from the band, who seem in high spirits throughout two sets that volley back and forth between spacy jamming and tight musicianship. Fan favorites of the era are speckled throughout the collection, including an especially electric "Let It Grow" that blurs into an equally dynamic "Eyes of the World"."

== Track listing ==
Disc 1

First set:

1. "Bertha" > (Jerry Garcia, Robert Hunter) – 7:50
2. "Good Lovin'" (Artie Resnick, Rudy Clark) – 6:26
3. "Brown-Eyed Women" (Garcia, Hunter) – 5:56
4. "Cassidy" (Bob Weir, John Barlow) – 5:02
5. "It Must Have Been the Roses" (Hunter) – 7:42
6. "Sunrise" (Donna Jean Godchaux) – 4:19
7. "New Minglewood Blues" (traditional, arranged by Grateful Dead) – 5:38
8. "Dupree's Diamond Blues" (Garcia, Hunter) – 6:45
9. "Let It Grow" (Weir, Barlow) – 13:43

Second set:

10. Jones Gang introduction – 1:40
11. "Samson and Delilah" > (traditional, arranged by Grateful Dead) – 7:21
12. "Cold Rain and Snow" (McGannahan Skjellyfetti) – 6:03

Disc 2

1. "Playing in the Band" > (Weir, Mickey Hart, Hunter) – 13:03
2. "Eyes of the World" > (Garcia, Hunter) – 13:11
3. "Estimated Prophet" > (Weir, Barlow) – 11:18
4. "The Other One" > (Weir, Bill Kreutzmann) – 4:25
5. "Drums" > (Hart, Kreutzmann) – 3:35
6. "Iko Iko" > (James "Sugar Boy" Crawford, Barbara Ann Hawkins, Rosa Lee Hawkins, Joan Marie Johnson) – 10:47
7. "Stella Blue" > (Garcia, Hunter) – 11:45
8. "Playing in the Band" (Weir, Hart, Hunter) – 7:01

Encore:

9. "Johnny B. Goode" (Chuck Berry) – 4:44

Disc 3

Seneca College Field House bonus tracks:

1. "Promised Land" (Berry) – 4:54
2. "They Love Each Other" (Garcia, Hunter) – 7:28
3. "Me and My Uncle" (John Phillips) – 3:05
4. "Big River" (Johnny Cash) – 6:22
5. "Candyman" (Garcia, Hunter) – 7:10
6. "Looks Like Rain" (Weir, Barlow) – 8:30
7. "Ramble On Rose" (Garcia, Hunter) – 8:41
8. "Scarlet Begonias" (Garcia, Hunter) – 10:28
9. "Fire on the Mountain" (Hart, Hunter) – 7:33
10. "Terrapin Station" (Garcia, Hunter) – 10:14

Note : The set list for the November 2, 1977 concert at Seneca College Field House in Toronto, Ontario was:

First set:: "Promised Land"^{[A]} · "They Love Each Other"^{[A]} · "Me and My Uncle"^{[A]} · "Big River"^{[A]} · "Candyman"^{[A]} · "Looks Like Rain"^{[A]} · "Ramble On Rose"^{[A]} · "Lazy Lightnin'"^{[B]} · "Supplication"^{[B]} · "Might as Well"^{[B]}

Second set: "Samson and Delilah" · "Ship of Fools" · "Good Lovin'" · "Sunrise" · "Scarlet Begonias"^{[A]} · "Fire on the Mountain"^{[A]} · "Estimated Prophet"^{[B]} · "St. Stephen"^{[B]} · "Truckin'"^{[B]} · "Around and Around"^{[B]}

Encore: "Terrapin Station"^{[A]}

[A] Included in Dave's Picks Volume 12
[B] Included in Dick's Picks Volume 34

== Personnel ==
Grateful Dead

- Jerry Garcia – guitar, vocals
- Donna Jean Godchaux – vocals
- Keith Godchaux – keyboards
- Mickey Hart – drums
- Bill Kreutzmann – drums
- Phil Lesh – electric bass, vocals
- Bob Weir – guitar, vocals

Production

- Produced by Grateful Dead
- Produced for release by David Lemieux
- Executive producer: Mark Pinkus
- Associate producers: Doran Tyson, Ivette Ramos
- CD mastering: Jeffrey Norman
- Recording: Betty Cantor-Jackson
- Art direction, design: Steve Vance
- Cover art: Tony Millionaire
- Photos: Patrick Harbron, Bob Minkin
- Tape research: Michael Wesley Johnson
- Archival research: Nicholas Meriwether
- Concert notes: Dick Latvala
