= Ladies and Gentlemen... the Grateful Dead =

Ladies And Gentlemen... The Grateful Dead

Live album by Grateful Dead
- Released: October 2000
- Recorded: April 25, 1971 – April 29, 1971
- Venue: Fillmore East
- Genres: Jam, folk rock, psychedelic rock
- Length: 296:44
- Label: Grateful Dead Records / Arista Records
- Producer: David Lemieux

Grateful Dead chronology
Dick's Picks Volume 19 (2000)	Ladies And Gentlemen... The Grateful Dead (2000)	Dick's Picks Volume 20 (2001)

Professional ratings
Review scores
Source	Rating
The Music Box	4/5 stars
Allmusic	4/5 stars

Ladies and Gentlemen... the Grateful Dead is a four-CD live album by the Grateful Dead. It was recorded at the April 25–29, 1971 shows at the Fillmore East in New York City. Some songs on the eponymous live album Grateful Dead were recorded at these shows as well. The album, released in October 2000, was certified Gold by the RIAA on January 6, 2002. The shows on Ladies and Gentlemen were recorded on a 16-track multitrack recorder and were mixed down to stereo for the album's release.

== Track listing ==
All tracks recorded at the Fillmore East

Disc 1
No.	Title	Recording date	Length
1.	"Truckin'" (Robert Hunter, Jerry Garcia, Phil Lesh, Bob Weir)	April 29, 1971	10:13
2.	"Bertha" (Hunter, Garcia)	April 29, 1971	6:27
3.	"Next Time You See Me" (Frank Forest, William G. Harvey)	April 25, 1971	4:23
4.	"Beat It On Down the Line" (Jesse Fuller)	April 25, 1971	3:35
5.	"Bird Song" (Hunter, Garcia)	April 28, 1971	9:18
6.	"Dark Hollow" (Bill Browning)	April 29, 1971	3:31
7.	"I Second That Emotion" (Al Cleveland, William Robinson)	April 25, 1971	5:22
8.	"Me and My Uncle" (John Phillips)	April 28, 1971	3:39
9.	"Cumberland Blues" (Hunter, Garcia, Lesh)	April 28, 1971	5:19
10.	"Good Lovin' >" (Rudy Clark, Arthur Resnick)	April 25, 1971	2:28
11.	"Drums >" (Bill Kreutzmann)	April 25, 1971	5:40
12.	"Good Lovin'" (Rudy Clark, Arthur Resnick)	April 25, 1971	15:00

Disc 2
No.	Title	Recording date	Length
1.	"Sugar Magnolia" (Hunter, Weir)	April 25, 1971	5:48
2.	"Loser" (Hunter, Garcia)	April 28, 1971	6:58
3.	"Ain't It Crazy (The Rub)" (Lightnin' Hopkins)	April 28, 1971	5:36
4.	"El Paso" (Marty Robbins)	April 28, 1971	5:34
5.	"I'm a King Bee" (Slim Harpo)	April 28, 1971	8:27
6.	"Ripple" (Hunter, Garcia)	April 29, 1971	5:15
7.	"Me and Bobby McGee" (Fred Foster, Kris Kristofferson)	April 28, 1971	6:16
8.	"Uncle John's Band >" (Hunter, Garcia)	April 27, 1971	6:06
9.	"Turn On Your Lovelight" (Deadric Malone, Joseph Scott)	April 27, 1971	22:18

Disc 3
No.	Title	Recording date	Length
1.	"China Cat Sunflower >" (Hunter, Garcia)	April 25, 1971	4:52
2.	"I Know You Rider" (trad., arr. Grateful Dead)	April 25, 1971	6:07
3.	"It Hurts Me Too" (Elmore James)	April 29, 1971	6:46
4.	"Sing Me Back Home" (Merle Haggard)	April 25, 1971	10:03
5.	"Hard To Handle" (Alvertis Isbell, Allen Jones, Otis Redding)	April 29, 1971	9:24
6.	"Dark Star >" (Hunter, Garcia, Mickey Hart, Kreutzmann, Lesh, Ron McKernan, Weir)	April 28, 1971	13:55
7.	"St. Stephen >" (Hunter, Garcia, Lesh)	April 28, 1971	6:06
8.	"Not Fade Away >" (Buddy Holly, Norman Petty)	April 28, 1971	3:31
9.	"Goin' Down the Road Feeling Bad >" (trad., arr. Grateful Dead)	April 28, 1971	6:27
10.	"Not Fade Away" (Holly, Petty)	April 28, 1971	3:30

Disc 4
No.	Title	Recording date	Length
1.	"Morning Dew" (Bonnie Dobson, Tim Rose)	April 29, 1971	10:29
2.	"New Minglewood Blues" (trad., arr. Weir)	April 29, 1971	4:23
3.	"Wharf Rat" (Hunter, Garcia)	April 28, 1971	9:19
4.	"Alligator >" (Hunter, McKernan, Lesh)	April 29, 1971	4:04
5.	"Drums >" (Kreutzmann)	April 29, 1971	4:11
6.	"Jam >" (Grateful Dead)	April 29, 1971	9:32
7.	"Goin' Down the Road Feeling Bad >" (trad., arr. Grateful Dead)	April 29, 1971	4:55
8.	"Cold Rain and Snow" (trad., arr. Grateful Dead)	April 29, 1971	5:47
9.	"Casey Jones" (Hunter, Garcia)	April 27, 1971	6:25
10.	"In the Midnight Hour >" (Steve Cropper, Wilson Pickett)	April 29, 1971	9:49
11.	"And We Bid You Goodnight" (trad., arr. Grateful Dead)	April 29, 1971	3:55

== Personnel ==
=== Grateful Dead ===
- Jerry Garcia – lead guitar, vocals
- Bill Kreutzmann – drums
- Phil Lesh – electric bass, vocals
- Ron "Pigpen" McKernan – organ, percussion, harmonica, vocals
- Bob Weir – rhythm guitar, vocals

Special guest appearance by:

- Tom Constanten – keyboards on disc 3, tracks 6–10

=== Production ===
- Compilation produced by David Lemieux
- Recorded by Bob Matthews and Betty Cantor-Jackson
- Mixed by Jeffrey Norman
- Tape archivists: Dick Latvala, David Lemieux
- Project coordinator: Cassidy Law
- Archival research: Eileen Law
- Cover design and lettering: Randy Tuten
- Tie dye artist: James Preston
- Photography: Amalie R. Rothschild, Fred Ordower
- Program notes: Blair Jackson
- Assistant engineer: Rudson Shurtliff
