= Dick's Picks Volume 34 =

Live album by Grateful Dead
- Released: February 14, 2005
- Recorded: November 5, 1977; November 2, 1977
- Genre: Rock
- Length: 210:52
- Label: Grateful Dead Records

Grateful Dead chronology
Dick's Picks Volume 33 (2004)	Dick's Picks Volume 34 (2005)	The Grateful Dead Movie Soundtrack (2005)

Professional ratings
Review scores
Source	Rating
Allmusic	4.5/5 stars
The Music Box	5/5 stars

Dick's Picks Volume 34 is the 34th installment of the Dick's Pick's series of Grateful Dead concert recordings. It is a three CD set that contains the complete show recorded on November 5, 1977, at the Community War Memorial in Rochester, New York. It also includes additional material recorded on November 2, 1977, at the Seneca College Field House in Toronto, Ontario, Canada.

== Booklet ==
The release includes a booklet made of four sheets of paper stapled together in the middle yielding a 16-page enclosure. The front duplicates the cover of the CD and the back features a photograph of the venue.

The booklet features many photographs, both in color and black-and-white, of the band playing on stage and of the crowd in attendance at the show. The last two pages feature a dark black-and-white photograph of Jerry Garcia on stage and list the contents of and credits for the release.

== Caveat emptor ==
Each volume of Dick's Picks has its own "caveat emptor" label, advising the listener of the sound quality of the recording. The one for volume 34 reads:

"Dick's Picks Volume 34 was mastered directly from the original two-track analog reel-to-reel tapes running at 7.5 IPS. Some minor sonic anomalies remain, due to the unavoidable effects of the ravages of time and the fragile nature of 1/4" analog tape. Additionally, due to a missing reel from November 5, 1977, we have used the PA cassette master tapes from that show to fix the problem."

== Track listing ==
Disc one

November 5, 1977, Community War Memorial – first set:

1. "New Minglewood Blues" (traditional, arranged by Bob Weir) – 5:52
2. "Mississippi Half-Step Uptown Toodeloo" (Jerry Garcia, Robert Hunter) – 12:08
3. "Looks Like Rain" (Weir, John Barlow) – 8:26
4. "Dire Wolf" (Garcia, Hunter) – 4:23
5. "Mama Tried" > (Merle Haggard) – 2:24
6. "Big River" (Johnny Cash) – 7:22
7. "Candyman" (Garcia, Hunter) – 7:54
8. "Jack Straw" (Weir, Hunter) – 6:28
9. "Deal" (Garcia, Hunter) – 6:45

Disc two

November 5, 1977, Community War Memorial – second set:

1. "Phil Solo" (Phil Lesh) – 2:06
2. "Take a Step Back" (Grateful Dead) – 1:06
3. "Eyes of the World" > (Garcia, Hunter) – 14:42
4. "Samson and Delilah" (traditional, arranged by Weir) – 8:43
5. "It Must Have Been the Roses" (Hunter) – 7:16

November 2, 1977, Seneca College Field House bonus tracks:

6. "Might as Well" (Garcia, Hunter) – 5:35
7. "Estimated Prophet" > (Weir, Barlow) – 11:08
8. "St. Stephen" > (Garcia, Lesh, Hunter) – 7:23
9. "Truckin' " > (Garcia, Lesh, Weir, Hunter) – 8:20
10. "Around and Around" (Chuck Berry) – 8:46

Disc three

November 5, 1977, Community War Memorial – second set, continued:

1. "Estimated Prophet" > (Weir, Barlow) – 11:13
2. "He's Gone" > (Garcia, Hunter) – 12:00
3. "Rhythm Devils" > (Mickey Hart, Bill Kreutzmann) – 2:15
4. "The Other One" > (Weir, Kreutzmann) – 12:23
5. "Black Peter" > (Garcia, Hunter) – 11:02
6. "Sugar Magnolia" (Weir, Hunter) – 10:54

November 5, 1977, Community War Memorial – encore:

7. "One More Saturday Night" (Weir) – 5:04

November 2, 1977, Seneca College Field House bonus tracks:

8. "Lazy Lightnin' " > (Weir, Barlow) – 3:31
9. "Supplication" (Weir, Barlow) – 5:19

Note : The set list for the November 2, 1977 concert at Seneca College Field House in Toronto, Ontario was:

First set: "Promised Land"^{[A]} · "They Love Each Other"^{[A]} · "Me and My Uncle"^{[A]} · "Big River"^{[A]} · "Candyman"^{[A]} · "Looks Like Rain"^{[A]} · "Ramble On Rose"^{[A]} · "Lazy Lightnin' "^{[B]} · "Supplication"^{[B]} · "Might as Well"^{[B]}

Second set: "Samson and Delilah" · "Ship of Fools" · "Good Lovin' " · "Sunrise" · "Scarlet Begonias"^{[A]} · "Fire on the Mountain"^{[A]} · "Estimated Prophet"^{[B]} · "St. Stephen"^{[B]} · "Truckin' "^{[B]} · "Around and Around"^{[B]}

Encore: "Terrapin Station"^{[A]}

[A] Included in Dave's Picks Volume 12
[B] Included in Dick's Picks Volume 34

== Personnel ==
Grateful Dead

- Jerry Garcia – lead guitar, vocals
- Donna Jean Godchaux – vocals
- Keith Godchaux – keyboards
- Mickey Hart – drums
- Bill Kreutzmann – drums
- Phil Lesh – electric bass, vocals
- Bob Weir – rhythm guitar, vocals

Production

- Betty Cantor-Jackson – recording
- David Lemieux – tape archivist
- Jeffrey Norman – CD mastering
- Eileen Law – archival research
- Jim Anderson – photography
- Robert Minkin – photography, cover art and package design
- Brian Walski – photography

== See also ==
- Dave's Picks Volume 12 - Features the complete show from November 4, 1977, as well as selections from November 2 during the same stretch of shows.
- Dave's Picks Volume 25 - Features the complete show from the night of November 6, 1977 during the same stretch of shows.
