= Dick's Picks Volume 21 =

Live album by Grateful Dead
- Released: March 20, 2001
- Recorded: November 1, 1985; September 2, 1980 (bonus tracks)
- Venues: Richmond Coliseum, Richmond, Virginia; Community War Memorial, Rochester, New York (bonus tracks)
- Genre: Rock
- Length: 187:24
- Label: Grateful Dead

Grateful Dead chronology
Dick's Picks Volume 20 (2001)	Dick's Picks Volume 21 (2001)	Dick's Picks Volume 22 (2001)

Professional ratings
Review scores
Source	Rating
Allmusic	4/5 stars
The Music Box	4/5 stars
Rolling Stone	3/5 stars

Dick's Picks Volume 21 is a three-CD live album by the rock group the Grateful Dead. It contains the complete concert that was recorded on November 1, 1985, at Richmond Coliseum in Richmond, Virginia. It also includes several bonus tracks recorded on September 2, 1980, at the Community War Memorial in Rochester, New York. It was released on March 20, 2001.

Dick's Picks Volume 21 features rare live recordings of "Spoonful", "Gimme Some Lovin'", "She Belongs to Me", "Gloria" and "Keep Your Day Job".

== Enclosure and review ==
The release includes two sheets of paper stapled together in the middle, yielding an eight-page enclosure. The front duplicates the cover of the CD and the back features a poem entitled "20th Anniversary Rag" which references some of the songs in the band's repertoire.

Inside, the first two pages contain a review by Stu Nixon, and filling the middle two pages is a color photograph of the band playing on stage. The last two pages list the contents of and credits for the release superimposed on a mostly black photograph containing a candle flame in the lower-right corner.

=== Review by Stu Nixon ===
Stu Nixon's review is entitled "Trouble ahead, Jerry's in red", and in it he asserts that the show in Richmond on November 1, 1985 "had both an uncommon song selection and a superb performance." He notes the two opening songs, "Dancing in the streets" and "Cold rain and Snow", which "were often played to jump-start the first set", "had only been played together once before - back in 1966!"

Regarding the second set, the author notes that "this was the only time that the [Lost] 'Sailor/Saint' [of Circumstance] combination was ever played in a show split by another song", which in this case was the drum solo. He writes of how he found "Jerry's heart-breakingly sweet 'She belongs to me' (performed only in 1985)" to be very moving and that Weir's 'Gloria' "whipped the crowd and the band into a frenzy."

Stu closes his review by exclaiming "This one must be heard to be believed! E-n-j-o-y!!!"

== Caveat emptor ==
Each volume of Dick's Picks has its own "caveat emptor" label, advising the listener of the sound quality of the recording. The one for Volume 21 reads:

"DP 21 was mastered from the original digital tapes, our earliest foray into the digital domain to date. The master tapes are Beta PCM cassettes, with stereo digital audio recorded on the video track. We've aimed to make this release sound as good as possible, and we feel we've succeeded. Hopefully you will agree. Enjoy."

== Track listing ==
Disc one

First set:

1. "Dancing in the Streets" (Marvin Gaye, Ivy Jo Hunter, William "Mickey" Stevenson) – 6:52 →
2. "Cold Rain And Snow" (trad., arr. Grateful Dead) – 7:32
3. "Little Red Rooster" (Willie Dixon) – 8:22
4. "Stagger Lee" (Robert Hunter, Jerry Garcia) – 5:55
5. "Me and My Uncle" (John Phillips) – 3:04 →
6. "Big River" (Cash) – 6:19
7. "Brown-Eyed Woman" (R. Hunter, Garcia) – 4:55
8. "Jack Straw" (R. Hunter, Bob Weir) – 5:24 →
9. "Don't Ease Me In" (trad., arr. Grateful Dead) – 3:14

Disc two

Second set:

1. "Samson and Delilah" (trad., arr. Weir) – 7:33
2. "High Time" (R. Hunter, Garcia) – 8:34 →
3. "He's Gone" (R. Hunter, Garcia) – 11:07 →
4. "Spoonful" (Dixon) – 4:54 →
5. "Comes a Time" (R. Hunter, Garcia) – 8:26 →
6. "Lost Sailor" (John Barlow, Weir) – 7:27 →
7. "Drums" (Mickey Hart, Bill Kreutzmann) – 9:06 →

Disc three

Second set, continued:

1. "Space" (Garcia, Phil Lesh, Weir) – 11:26 →
2. "Saint of Circumstance" (Barlow, Weir) – 6:52 →
3. "Gimme Some Lovin' " (Spencer Davis, Muff Winwood, Steve Winwood) – 4:27 →
4. "She Belongs to Me" (Bob Dylan) – 7:54 →
5. "Gloria" (Van Morrison) – 6:51

Encore:

6. "Keep Your Day Job" (R. Hunter, Garcia) – 4:14

Bonus tracks recorded September 2, 1980:

7. "Space" (Garcia, Lesh, Weir) – 8:33 →
8. "Iko Iko" (James "Sugar Boy" Crawford) – 7:47 →
9. "Morning Dew" (Dobson, Rose) – 11:04 →
10. "Sugar Magnolia" (R. Hunter, Weir) – 9:14

== Personnel ==
=== Grateful Dead ===
- Jerry Garcia – lead guitar, vocals
- Bob Weir – rhythm guitar, vocals
- Phil Lesh – electric bass, vocals
- Brent Mydland – keyboards, vocals
- Mickey Hart – drums
- Bill Kreutzmann – drums

=== Production ===
- Dan Healy – recording
- Jeffrey Norman – mastering
- Dick Latvala – tape archivist
- David Lemieux – tape archivist
- Eileen Law – archival research
- Robert Minkin – photography
- Tina Carpenter – cover art and design
- David DeNoma – cover photography
