= The Phellowship =

Support group for fans of the band Phish

The Phellowship is a sober support group aimed at concert goers who choose to remain drug and alcohol free at Phish shows. Though the group attends each show, the Phellowship is not officially affiliated with Phish, nor with Alcoholics Anonymous, Narcotics Anonymous, or any other recovery program. Moreover, it does not comment on nor condemn the use of drugs and alcohol. Instead, its stated mission is to provide community and comradery among sober attendees. Its only requirement for membership is that fans remain substance-free during the show.

The Phellowship took root around 1995 among fans on Phish message boards, drawing inspiration from the Wharf Rats, a sober group of Grateful Dead fans dating to the 1980s. It borrows many Wharf Rat traditions; yellow balloons and stickers to mark their presence, an informational/merchandise table within the venue, and a 12-step style meeting during set break. Representatives are active online on Facebook, Reddit, and other sites, and post their location prior to each show.

Since The Phellowship's inception, a number of other sober fan groups have risen out of the Jam Band scene:

Band	Sober Group
String Cheese Incident	Jellyfish
Widespread Panic	Gateway
moe.	Happy Hour Heroes
Umphrey's McGee	Much Obliged
Disco Biscuits	Digital Buddhas
Goose	Hot Tea Party
Billy Strings	Dustie Baggies
Ween	Sunny Bunny Recovery
The Werks	Better Than Before
