= Grateful Dead (album) =

Live album by Grateful Dead
- Released: September 24, 1971
- Recorded: March 24 – April 29, 1971
- Genres: Jam rock; roots rock; psychedelic rock; blues rock
- Length: 70:12
- Label: Warner Bros. (#2WS-1935)
- Producers: Grateful Dead with Betty Cantor and Bob Matthews

Grateful Dead chronology
Historic Dead (1971)	Grateful Dead (1971)	Europe '72 (1972)

Professional ratings
Review scores
Source	Rating
AllMusic	4/5 stars
The Village Voice	A− (later B+)

Grateful Dead is a live album by rock band the Grateful Dead. Released on September 24, 1971, on Warner Bros. Records, it is their second live double album and their seventh album overall. Although published without a title, it is generally known by the names Skull and Roses (due to its iconic cover art) and Skull Fuck (the name the band originally wanted to give to the album, which was rejected by the record company). It was the group's first album to be certified gold by the RIAA and remained their best seller until surpassed by Skeletons from the Closet.

== Recording and release ==
Unlike Live/Dead, the album contained several lead and background vocal overdubs. For the three new original compositions ("Bertha", "Playing in the Band", and "Wharf Rat"), the band invited Jerry Garcia associate Merl Saunders to overdub organ parts. This made the organ playing of Saunders more prominent than that of Pigpen, whose contributions tend to be buried in the mix.

"Playing in the Band" received a good amount of airplay, and became one of the Dead's most played songs in concert (a studio version was released the following year on rhythm guitarist Bob Weir's solo album Ace). The closing segue of "Not Fade Away" into "Goin' Down the Road Feeling Bad" also received airplay and became a fan favorite.

The album's cover art, composed by Alton Kelly and Stanley Mouse, is based on an illustration by Edmund Joseph Sullivan for an old edition of the Rubaiyat of Omar Khayyam. Though the album has been known by the sobriquet "Skull & Roses", the original vertical gatefold cover unfolds to reveal the entire skeleton. The graphic became one of the images most associated with the band.

Opening track "Bertha" fades in on the original version of the album, in semblance of entering the performance space. A longer, full opening is used on CD/digital copies. More tracks from the same source concerts were later released on Ladies and Gentlemen... the Grateful Dead.

The 7" single release of "Johnny B. Goode" (a split single with Elvin Bishop) was actually the version from the album Fillmore: The Last Days. However, the version from this album was later used as a B-side on the re-release of the "Truckin'" single.

The album was remastered and expanded for the 2001 box set The Golden Road. This version, with three bonus tracks (two contemporaneous live tracks and a hidden promotional track) and the extended "Bertha", was released separately, in 2003.

The 50th Anniversary Edition of Skull and Roses was released on June 25, 2021, in CD, LP, and digital formats. The CD includes a bonus disc of songs recorded live at the Fillmore West in San Francisco on July 2, 1971.

== Title and message ==
When the band submitted Skull Fuck (a contemporary phrase meaning "something that blows your mind") as the album title, it was rejected by the record label. Ultimately the agreement was made that the album would be published without the title appearing anywhere on the record labels or cover artwork. Though the band refers to the album by this title, and it has long been known to fans (through interviews with band members, the Deadhead network and other outlets), the alternate, descriptive title "Skull & Roses" developed among distributors, music buyers and reviewers as a graphic incipit from the cover artwork.

Drummer Bill Kreutzmann explained the lack of a title on the artwork and labels, "...the original name was going to be 'Skull Fuck'. This was a time long before rap artists like Eminem numbed concerned citizens to the idea of offensive language in music. Warner Brothers freaked out on us. They said stores would boycott it and we wouldn't be able to get it on shelves."

Inside the gatefold of the original LP, the band reached out directly to its burgeoning fan base, which had begun to attend multiple concerts in a row and collect live audio tapes of each concert, with a message reading:

Dead Freaks Unite: Who are you? Where are you? How are you?
Send us your name and address and we'll keep you informed.
Dead Heads, P.O. Box 1065, San Rafael, California 94901.

The mailing address is no longer valid.

== Track listing ==
Side one
No.	Title	Writer(s)	Lead vocals	Length
1.	"Bertha"	Jerry Garcia, Robert Hunter	Garcia	5:27
2.	"Mama Tried"	Merle Haggard	Weir	2:42
3.	"Big Railroad Blues"	Noah Lewis	Garcia	3:34
4.	"Playing in the Band"	Bob Weir, Hunter	Weir	4:39

Side two
No.	Title	Writer(s)	Lead vocals	Length
1.	"The Other One"	Weir, Bill Kreutzmann	Weir	18:05

Side three
No.	Title	Writer(s)	Lead vocals	Length
1.	"Me and My Uncle"	John Phillips	Weir	3:06
2.	"Big Boss Man"	Luther Dixon, Al Smith	McKernan	5:12
3.	"Me and Bobby McGee"	Fred Foster, Kris Kristofferson	Weir	5:43
4.	"Johnny B. Goode"	Chuck Berry	Weir	3:42

Side four
No.	Title	Writer(s)	Lead vocals	Length
1.	"Wharf Rat"	Garcia, Hunter	Garcia	8:31
2.	"Not Fade Away / Goin' Down the Road Feeling Bad"	Charles Hardin, Norman Petty / Traditional, arr. Grateful Dead	Garcia; Weir	9:14
Total length:				70:12

2001/2003 reissue bonus tracks
No.	Title	Writer(s)	Lead vocals	Length
12.	"Oh, Boy!"	Sonny West, Bill Tilghman, Petty	Garcia; Weir	2:50
13.	"I'm a Hog for You"	Jerry Leiber, Mike Stoller	McKernan; Garcia	4:08
14.	"Grateful Dead radio spot"			1:00

Notes:

- "The Other One" includes a drum solo.
- The four sides of the vinyl album were combined as tracks 1–11 on CD reissues.

=== 50th Anniversary Edition ===
Disc two (recorded July 2, 1971, Fillmore West)
No.	Title	Writer(s)	Length
1.	"Good Lovin'"	Rudy Clark, Artie Resnick	17:47
2.	"Sing Me Back Home"	Haggard	10:16
3.	"Mama Tried"	Haggard	3:08
4.	"Cryptical Envelopment"	Garcia	2:25
5.	"Drums"	Kreutzmann	5:13
6.	"The Other One"	Weir, Kreutzmann	15:51
7.	"Big Boss Man"	Dixon, Smith	5:27
8.	"Not Fade Away"	Hardin, Petty	3:57
9.	"Goin' Down the Road Feeling Bad"	Traditional, arr. Grateful Dead	9:39
10.	"Not Fade Away"	Hardin, Petty	2:35
Total length:			76:26

== Recording dates ==
Recording dates
Title	Date
"Johnny B. Goode"	March 24, 1971; Winterland Ballroom, San Francisco, CA
"Big Railroad Blues"	April 5, 1971; Hammerstein Ballroom, New York, NY
"Not Fade Away / Goin' Down the Road Feeling Bad"	April 5, 1971; Hammerstein Ballroom, New York, NY
"Playing in the Band"	April 6, 1971; Hammerstein Ballroom, New York, NY
"Oh, Boy!"	April 6, 1971; Hammerstein Ballroom, New York, NY
"I'm a Hog for You"	April 6, 1971; Hammerstein Ballroom, New York, NY
"Mama Tried"	April 26, 1971; Fillmore East, New York, NY
"Big Boss Man"	April 26, 1971; Fillmore East, New York, NY
"Wharf Rat"	April 26, 1971; Fillmore East, New York, NY
"Bertha"	April 27, 1971; Fillmore East, New York, NY
"Me and Bobby McGee"	April 27, 1971; Fillmore East, New York, NY
"The Other One"	April 28, 1971; Fillmore East, New York, NY
"Me and My Uncle"	April 29, 1971; Fillmore East, New York, NY

Note: More songs from the April 25 – 29, 1971 shows at the Fillmore East are included in Ladies and Gentlemen... the Grateful Dead and Enjoying the Ride.

== Personnel ==
Grateful Dead

- Jerry Garcia – lead guitar, vocals
- Bob Weir – rhythm guitar, vocals
- Phil Lesh – bass guitar, vocals
- Bill Kreutzmann – drums
- Ron "Pigpen" McKernan – organ, harmonica, vocals

Additional musicians

- Merl Saunders – organ on "Bertha", "Playing in the Band", "Wharf Rat"

Production

- Produced by Grateful Dead
- Recording: Bob Matthews, Betty Cantor
- Artwork: Alton Kelley
- Photo: Bob Seidemann

Production – 50th Anniversary Edition

- Produced for release by David Lemieux
- Mastering: David Glasser
- Tape restoration and speed correction: Jamie Howarth, John Chester
- Recording – Fillmore West bonus disc: Rex Jackson
- Design: Steve Vance
- Liner notes essay: Gary Lambert

== Charts ==
Chart (1971)	Peak position
Canadian RPM 100 Albums	28
US Billboard Top LP's	25
US Cash Box Top 100 Albums	31
US Record World Album Chart	24

== Certifications ==
Region	Certification	Certified units/sales
United States (RIAA)	Gold	500,000^{^}
^{^} Shipments figures based on certification alone.
