= Houston, Texas 11-18-1972 =

Live album by the rock band the Grateful Dead

Live album by Grateful Dead
- Released: November 28, 2014
- Recorded: November 18, 1972
- Genre: Rock
- Length: 79:54
- Label: Rhino
- Producer: Grateful Dead

Grateful Dead chronology
Dave's Picks Volume 12 (2014)	Houston, Texas 11-18-1972 (2014)	Dave's Picks Volume 13 (2015)

Houston, Texas 11-18-1972 is a live album by the rock band the Grateful Dead. It was recorded on November 18, 1972, at Hofheinz Pavilion in Houston, Texas, and includes most of the second set of the concert. It was produced as a CD, and also as a limited edition, two-disc vinyl LP, and was released by Rhino Records on November 28, 2014, in conjunction with Record Store Day Black Friday.

== Track listing ==
=== CD ===
The track listing for the CD is:

1. "Bertha" (Jerry Garcia, Robert Hunter) – 5:53
2. "Greatest Story Ever Told" (Bob Weir, Mickey Hart, Hunter) – 5:04
3. "He's Gone" (Garcia, Hunter) – 16:05
4. "Jack Straw" (Weir, Hunter) – 4:47
5. "Deal" (Garcia, Hunter) – 4:43
6. "Playing in the Band" (Weir, Hart, Hunter) – 25:49
7. "Mississippi Half-Step Uptown Toodeloo" (Garcia, Hunter) – 8:45
8. "Sugar Magnolia" (Weir, Hunter) – 8:45

=== LP ===
On the vinyl album the songs are in a slightly different order:

Side A

1. "Bertha" (Garcia, Hunter) – 5:53
2. "Greatest Story Ever Told" (Weir, Hart, Hunter) – 5:04
3. "Deal" (Garcia, Hunter) – 4:43

Side B

1. "He's Gone" (Garcia, Hunter) – 16:05
2. "Jack Straw" (Weir, Hunter) – 4:47

Side C

1. "Playing in the Band" (Weir, Hart, Hunter) – 25:49

Side D

1. "Mississippi Half-Step Uptown Toodeloo" (Garcia, Hunter) – 8:45
2. "Sugar Magnolia" (Weir, Hunter) – 8:45

== Personnel ==
Grateful Dead

- Jerry Garcia – guitar, vocals
- Donna Jean Godchaux – vocals
- Keith Godchaux – keyboards
- Bill Kreutzmann – drums
- Phil Lesh – electric bass, vocals
- Bob Weir – guitar, vocals

Production

- Produced by Grateful Dead
- Original recordings produced by Owsley Stanley
- Produced for release by David Lemieux
- Executive producer: Mark Pinkus
- Associate producers: Doran Tyson, Ivette Ramos
- Mastering: Jeffrey Norman
- Cover illustration: Gary Houston
- Art direction, design: Steve Vance

== Concert set list ==
The set list for the November 18, 1972 concert at Hofheinz Pavilion was:

- First set: "Promised Land", "Sugaree", "Mexicali Blues", "Loser", "Black Throated Wind", "Tennessee Jed", "El Paso", "Big Railroad Blues", "Box of Rain", "China Cat Sunflower"> "I Know You Rider", "Beat It On Down the Line", "Brown Eyed Women", "Around and Around", "Casey Jones"
- Second set: "Bertha">^{[a]} "Greatest Story Ever Told",^{[a]} "He's Gone",^{[a]} "Jack Straw",^{[a]} "Deal",^{[a]} "Playing in the Band",^{[a]} "Mississippi Half-Step Uptown Toodeloo",^{[a]} "Sugar Magnolia",^{[a]} "One More Saturday Night"
- Encore: "Uncle John's Band"

^{[a]} Included in Houston, Texas 11-18-1972
