= Blue Cross Arena =

Multi-purpose indoor arena in Rochester, New York, U.S.

- The War Memorial

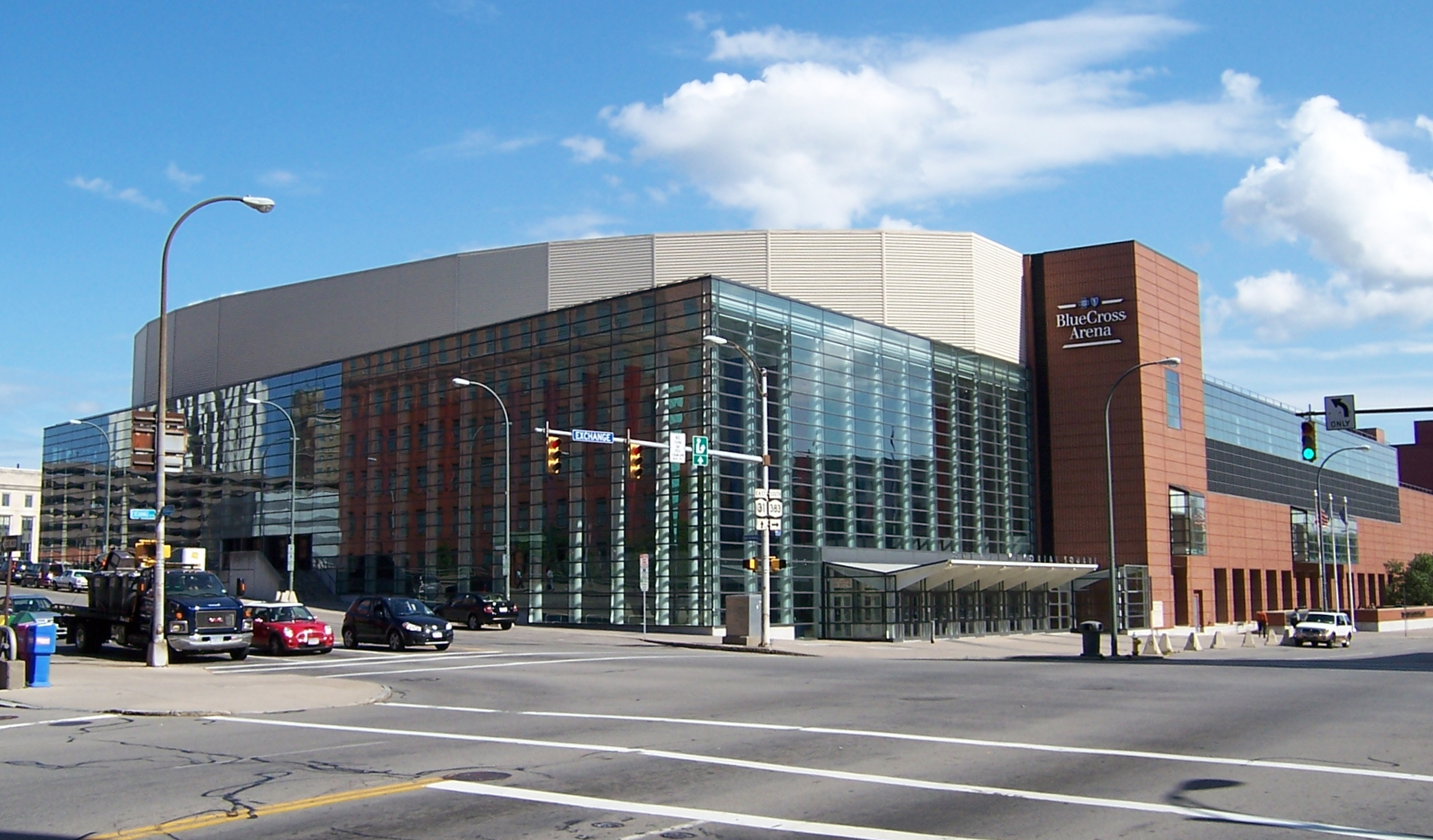

- Location within New York Location within the United States
- Full name: Blue Cross Arena at the War Memorial
- Former names: Rochester Civic Center Arena (planning/construction); Rochester Community War Memorial (1955–1998)
- Address: 1 War Memorial Square
- Location: Rochester, New York, U.S.
- Coordinates: 43°09′13.3″N 77°36′38.8″W
- Owner: City of Rochester
- Operator: VenuWorks
- Capacity: Hockey: 10,662; Lacrosse: 10,662; End stage 180°: 10,877; End stage 270°: 11,352; End stage 360°: 12,428; In the Round: 12,906; General Admission: 14,000; Floor Size: 85' wide x 200' deep Seating Configuration: Floor: 1,600; Lower Bowl: 4,696; Upper Bowl: 6,052; Total Seats: 12,428
- Executive suites: 25

Construction
- Groundbreaking: February 1, 1953
- Opened: October 18, 1955
- Renovated: 1998
- Cost: US$7.5 million ($90.3 million in 2025 dollars) $41 million (1998 renovations) ($84.2 million in 2025 dollars)
- Architect: Leonard A. Waasdorp

Tenants
- Rochester Royals (NBA) (1955–1957); Rochester Americans (AHL) (1956–present); Rochester Colonels (EPBL) (1958–1959); New York Tuck Tapers (NIBL) (1959–1961); Rochester Griffins (NLL) (1974); Rochester Zeniths (CBA) (1978–1983); Rochester Knighthawks (NLL) (1995–2019); Rochester Brigade (af2) (2001–2003); Rochester Raiders (CIFL/IFL) (2008–2009); Rochester Lancers (MISL/MASL) (2011–2015); Rochester Knighthawks (NLL) (2019–present)

Website
- bluecrossarena.com

Blue Cross Arena, also known as the War Memorial, is a multi-purpose indoor arena located in Rochester, New York. For hockey and lacrosse, its seating capacity is 10,662. The arena opened on October 18, 1955, as the Rochester Community War Memorial. It was renovated in the mid-1990s and reopened as The Blue Cross Arena at the War Memorial, on September 18, 1998. It is home to the Rochester Americans of the American Hockey League and the Rochester Knighthawks of the National Lacrosse League.

== History ==
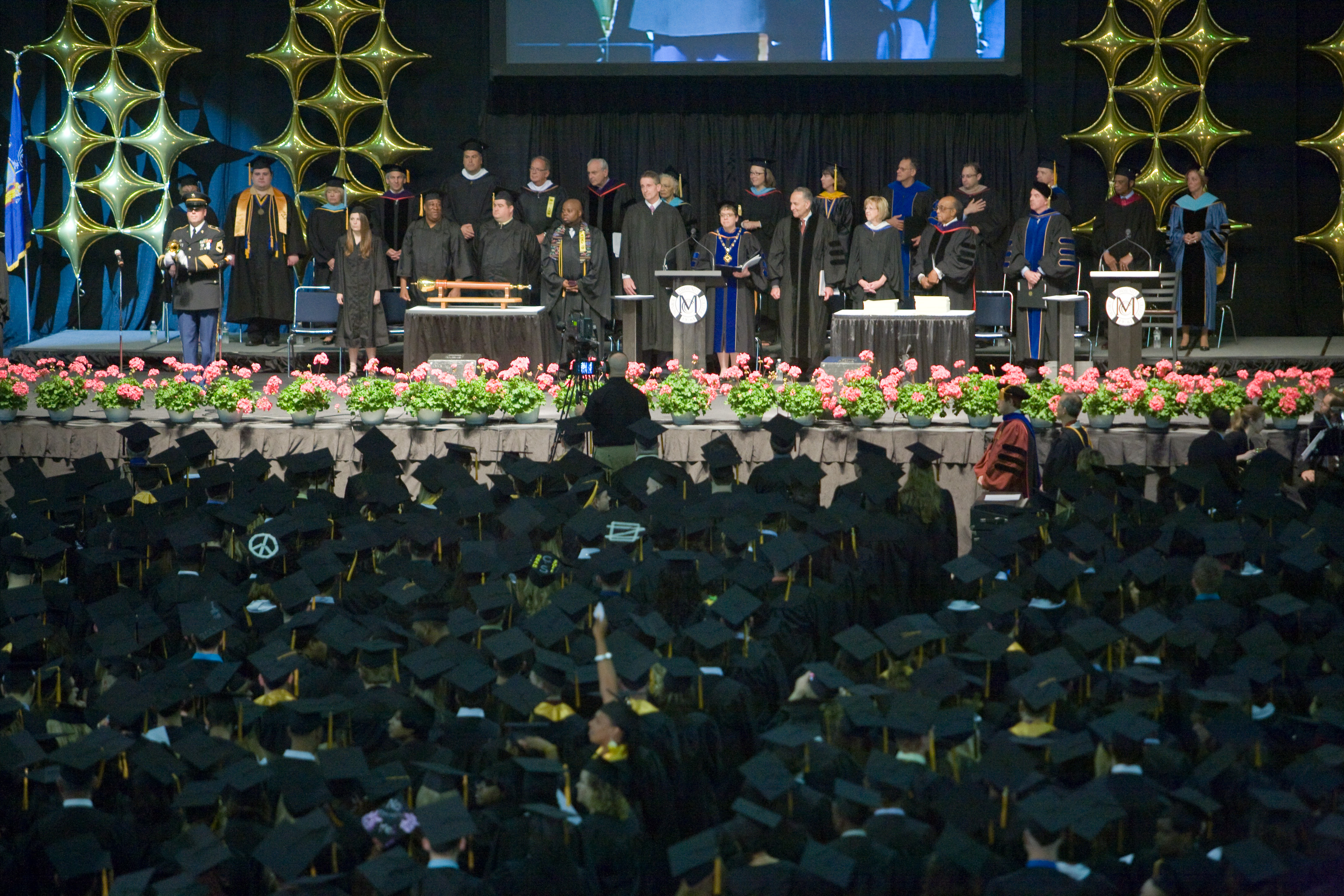
Monroe Community College graduation at the Blue Cross Arena

The arena was built on a downtown site as a replacement for Edgerton Park Arena, bounded by Exchange Boulevard on the west, East Broad Street on the north, the Genesee River on the east and Court Street on the south. The property was formerly the home of the Kimball Tobacco Co. and other retail buildings. Originally named the Rochester Community War Memorial, the arena was built to honor World War II veterans and was formally dedicated on Memorial Day 1956. The building also included a room dedicated to the community's war dead that served as a memorial shrine; the shrine was later closed to the public due to vandalism, and when the arena was reconstructed in 1998, its plaques and inscribed marble pieces were relocated to the rear of the main floor. The arena opened on October 18, 1955. The building included a full stage on the south end and an exhibition hall located on the basement level. One of the members of the construction team was a young Robert Marella, who later achieved fame as professional wrestler Gorilla Monsoon. The arena's first tenant was the Rochester Royals NBA basketball team, who played their final two seasons in Rochester at this arena. They were joined by the Americans the next year, who have played in the arena for 63 consecutive seasons.

On March 13, 1996, renovations to expand the arena took place, eliminating the permanent stage at the south end of the building. On July 24, 1998, Blue Cross Blue Shield and City officials announced that the name of the renovated arena would be Blue Cross Arena at the War Memorial. On September 18, 1998, the arena reopened to the public during a formal ribbon cutting/rededication ceremony. DeWolff Partnership Architects completed the project as Architects of Record with Rossetti Architects in a consultant relationship. C.E. DeWolff, Senior Partner of DeWolff Partnership, Geno Rossetti of Rossetti Architects, were Design Associates who collaborated on features of the design. In 2018, the city terminated the arena management contract with long term operator SMG who had been running the arena since 2000. In July 2018, the city reached an agreement with Pegula Sports and Entertainment, owners of the Americans, Buffalo Sabres and Buffalo Bills and operators of KeyBank Center in Buffalo to operate the arena beginning on August 1, 2018. Shortly after the Pegula takeover the arena received updates of a new center scoreboard, a new ribbon board at the stage end of the arena and enhancements to the audio and video equipment. There are plans for expansion along the Exchange Boulevard side of the arena that will make room for additional office space and improved locker room facilities as well as planned upgrades to the bathrooms, new concessions and a restaurant. Pegula has been criticized for monopolizing the arena for its own teams and disallowing other tenants to play there, which became an even greater problem when alternative arenas such as The Dome Center and the Main Street Armory closed to tenants in 2023; the Rochester Lancers indoor soccer team was forced to fold in part because Pegula refused to rent the arena to them and no other arenas were available.

Blue Cross Arena's portable stage, which measures 80 feet deep by 80 feet wide, is said to be deeper than, and is nearly the same size as, the proscenium stage at Radio City Music Hall across the state in New York City.

== Notable events ==
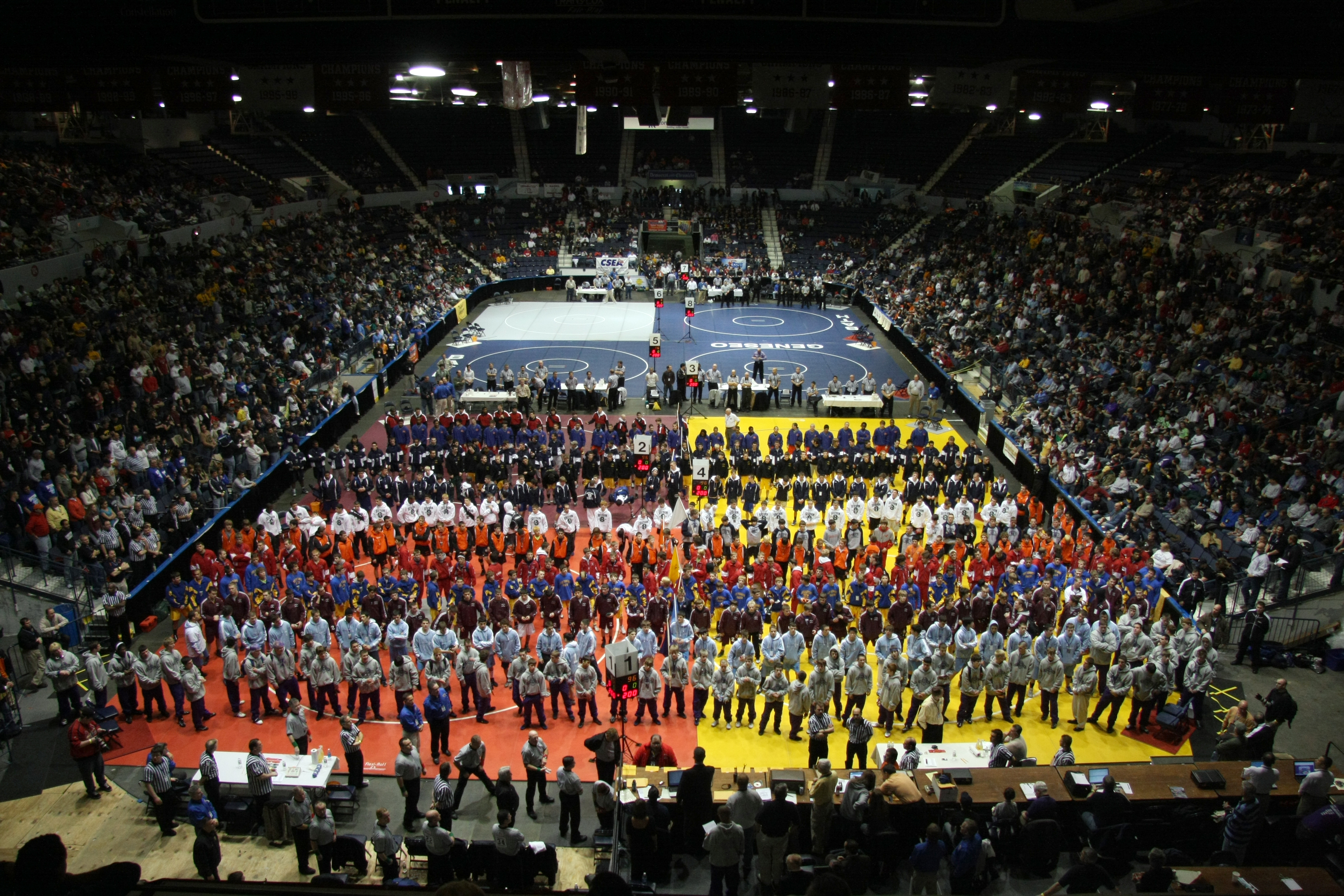
Wrestlers gather on the floor of the Blue Cross Arena at the start of the 46th NYSPHSAA Wrestling Championships on March 8, 2008.

The first event at the facility was a solemn Pontifical High Mass before 6,000 people, which kicked off a weeklong exhibit on Roman Catholic missionary work. The exhibition hall also hosted a public trade show featuring such famous Rochester-based companies as Eastman Kodak, Haloid (now Xerox), Bausch & Lomb, General Railway Signal and Rochester Products.

It hosted the 1956 NBA All-Star Game, the two-month finals of the American Bowling Congress tournament in both 1956 and 1966.

Judy Garland performed a one-night stand concert at the War Memorial on her comeback tour, the night of October 17, 1961.

A semifinal game and the final game of the ECAC Upstate-Southern Region tournament, an NCAA Division I men's college basketball tournament organized by the Eastern College Athletic Conference (ECAC), took place at the War Memorial in 1978; the tournament champion received an automatic bid to the 1978 NCAA Men's Division I Basketball Tournament.

World Wrestling Entertainment has run many shows at the arena, most notably several television tapings 1997's In Your House 14: Revenge of the 'Taker Pay Per View event. In 1990 at a television taping, Mr. Perfect won the Intercontinental title from The Texas Tornado and in 1994, Diesel (Kevin Nash) beat Razor Ramon for the Intercontinental title.

On July 28, 2007, the CIFL Championship Game was held in the arena. It was the first arena football game played in the venue since the Rochester Brigade folded in 2003.

Local high school basketball games are played here, most notably the New York State Public High School Section V (5) Championships at the end of each season. Additionally, the arena is the home of high school cheerleading championships each year. The arena also hosts college basketball, and Section V hockey and wrestling.

On Saturday and Sunday, March 8–9, 2008, the Blue Cross Arena played host to the 46th NYSPHSAA Wrestling Championships, just the second time the annual interscholastic event has been held in the Rochester area.

The arena attendance record of 11,650 was set December 3, 2003 when Syracuse University defeated St. Bonaventure University in men's basketball. St. Bonaventure has hosted one of its home games in Rochester every year since 2002.

In 2016, the arena hosted the Kellogg's Tour of Gymnastics Champions.

On May 18, 2019, the arena held their first MMA event UFC Fight Night: dos Anjos vs. Lee.

In addition to sporting events, the arena hosts a wide variety of entertainment events, including live concerts, ice shows and the circus.

On November 1, 1965, The Rolling Stones played here in a concert that lasted only 7 minutes, when several thousand fans rushed the stage causing police to cancel the show. On August 9, 1971, The Who played at the War Memorial just five days before releasing their classic album "Who's Next". Led Zeppelin played to a standing room audience concert on September 11, 1971.

The Grateful Dead's performance, on November 5, 1977, was recorded and later released as a live album, entitled Dick's Picks Volume 34. Part of the Grateful Dead's performance on September 2, 1980, is included as bonus tracks on Dick's Picks Volume 21. The band performed at the arena ten times between 1973 and 1985.

Footage from Phish's documentary Bittersweet Motel, was filmed here on December 11, 1997.

=== Ice hockey ===
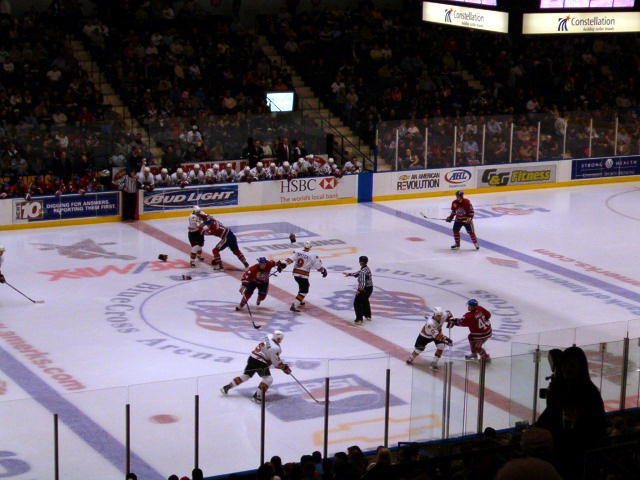
Amerks vs the Binghamton Senators in 2005

Aside from the Rochester Americans, who play their home games in the arena, the Blue Cross Arena has played host to several notable ice hockey events and games. On November 12, 2003, the Buffalo Sabres and the defending Stanley Cup champion New Jersey Devils played the first National Hockey League regular season game in the venue. The game was made possible by then Sabres owner Tom Golisano, who hails from Rochester, and featured two Rochester natives: Brian Gionta of the Devils and Rory Fitzpatrick of the Sabres. It ended in a 2–2 tie. A second regular season game was held at the arena on October 26, 2005, with the Sabres falling to the Washington Capitals, 3–2 with 8,552 in attendance.

On March 23, 2006, Atlantic Hockey, an NCAA Division I Men's ice hockey league, announced that its league tournaments in 2007, 2008, and 2009 would be held at the Blue Cross Arena. 2007 was the first time the tournament was held at a neutral site. The league continued to hold their tournament there each year through 2018 when it then moved to Buffalo's LECOM Harborcenter. Additionally, the 2007 NCAA Men's Division I Ice Hockey East Regional was held at the Blue Cross Arena. Attendance was low due to high ticket prices and distance from large Division I programs.

The Rochester Institute of Technology men's hockey team regularly play their homecoming hockey game at Blue Cross Arena instead of at their smaller on-campus rink, due to the large capacity, also usually playing a higher level Division I hockey team, such as Notre Dame in 2023, Bowling Green in 2024, and Clarkson in 2025. The RIT women's hockey team hosted an exhibition game at the arena on October 16, 2021, after the Gene Polisseni Center was temporarily shut down for an ammonia leak.

Every year, the Blue Cross Arena hosts regular season Section V high school hockey games and the Section V Basketball championship.

== See also ==
- Edgerton Park Arena

Events and tenants
Preceded by Edgerton Park Arena	Home of the Rochester Royals; 1955–1957	Succeeded by Cincinnati Gardens
Preceded by Madison Square Garden	Host of the NBA All-Star Game; 1956	Succeeded by Boston Garden
