= The Complete 1969 Recordings =

Box set by King Crimson
- Released: 6 November 2020
- Recorded: 6 May – 14 December 1969
- Genre: Progressive rock
- Labels: Discipline Global Mobile; Panegyric; Wowow Entertainment, Inc.

King Crimson chronology
Heaven & Earth (2019)	The Complete 1969 Recordings (2020)	In the Court of the Crimson King: King Crimson at 50 (2022)

The Complete 1969 Recordings is the ninth major box set by rock band King Crimson. It features 26 discs worth of material spanning their first studio album, In the Court of the Crimson King.

The box set's new session material was remixed to stereo by David Singleton. It also features a new Dolby Atmos remix of the original album by Steven Wilson.

The box set includes 20 CDs worth of material with another 2 DVDs and 4 Blu-ray discs. The album also features a booklet of unseen photos from the recording sessions as well as memorabilia

== Reception ==
Writing for All About Jazz, John Kelman loved the album especially highlighting the sound quality. He added in conclusion: "For those who wanted to understand just how remarkable King Crimson Mark I's many achievements were, and in such a short period of time, The Complete 1969 Recordings now comes as the absolutely best document."

== Track listing ==
CD 1 - Live at Hyde Park, July 5, 1969
No.	Title	Length
1.	"21st Century Schizoid Man"	6:37
2.	"The Court of the Crimson King"	6:31
3.	"Get Thy Bearings"	8:59
4.	"Announcement (Incomplete)"	0:43
5.	"Epitaph"	4:20
6.	"Mantra"	3:12
7.	"Travel Weary Capricorn"	5:38
8.	"Mars"	3:34
9.	"Band Reunion Meeting"	14:52

CD 2 - Live At The Marquee, July 6, 1969
No.	Title	Length
1.	"21st Century Schizoid Man"	6:21
2.	"Drop In"	5:42
3.	"Announcement (Incomplete)"	0:43
4.	"I Talk To The Wind"	4:34
5.	"Epitaph (Incomplete)"	3:21
6.	"Travel Weary Capricorn"	11:07
7.	"Improv (Inc Nola And Etude No. 7)"	12:29
8.	"Mars"	8:22

CD 3 - Live At Plumpton Festival, August 9, 1969
No.	Title	Length
1.	"21st Century Schizoid Man"	7:36
2.	"Get Thy Bearings"	10:49
3.	"Announcement"	0:17
4.	"The Court of the Crimson King"	7:02
5.	"Mantra"	8:49
6.	"Travel Weary Capricorn"	3:58
7.	"Improv (Including By The Sleeping Lagoon)"	8:53
8.	"Mars"	8:05

CD 4 - Live at Chesterfield, September 6, 1969
No.	Title	Length
1.	"21st Century Schizoid Man"	8:19
2.	"Drop In"	6:36
3.	"Announcement"	0:47
4.	"Epitaph"	8:13
5.	"Get Thy Bearings"	18:36
6.	"Announcement"	1:23
7.	"I Talk To The Wind"	5:11

CD 5 - Live at Chesterfield, September 6, 1969
No.	Title	Length
1.	"Announcement"	0:50
2.	"The Court of the Crimson King"	7:09
3.	"Mantra"	5:56
4.	"Travel Weary Capricorn"	8:01
5.	"Improv"	8:40
6.	"Mars"	8:22

CD 6 - Live at the Fillmore East, November 21 & 22, 1969
No.	Title	Length
1.	"The Court of the Crimson King (Incomplete)"	2:16
2.	"Announcement"	0:20
3.	"A Man, A City"	11:44
4.	"Announcement"	0:37
5.	"Epitaph"	7:43
6.	"Announcement"	0:21
7.	"21st Century Schizoid Man"	8:05
8.	"The Court of the Crimson King (Incomplete)"	2:01
9.	"Announcement"	0:16
10.	"A Man, A City"	11:51
11.	"Announcement"	0:29
12.	"Epitaph"	7:40
13.	"Announcement"	0:52
14.	"21st Century Schizoid Man"	7:56

CD 7 - Live At The Fillmore West, December 13 & 14, 1969
No.	Title	Length
1.	"Mantra"	3:46
2.	"Travel Weary Capricorn"	3:17
3.	"Improv Travel Bleary Capricorn"	2:23
4.	"Mars"	8:57
5.	"The Court of the Crimson King"	7:00
6.	"Announcement"	0:23
7.	"Drop In"	5:15
8.	"A Man, a City"	11:20
9.	"Announcement"	0:24
10.	"Epitaph"	7:31
11.	"Announcement"	0:50
12.	"21st Century Schizoid Man"	7:37
13.	"Announcement"	0:25
14.	"Mars"	9:44

CD 8 - In the Court of the Crimson King, Original Master Edition, Expanded
No.	Title	Length
1.	"21st Century Schizoid Man"	7:22
2.	"I Talk To The Wind"	6:05
3.	"Epitaph"	8:48
4.	"Moonchild"	12:13
5.	"The Court of the Crimson King"	9:28
6.	"21st Century Schizoid Man"	6:46
7.	"I Talk To The Wind"	4:15
8.	"Epitaph"	9:06
9.	"The Court of the Crimson King (Single A Side)"	3:23
10.	"The Court of the Crimson King (Single B Side)"	4:30

CD 9 - In the Court of the Crimson King, Alternate Album, Expanded
No.	Title	Length
1.	"Wind Session"	4:27
2.	"21st Century Schizoid Man (Morgan Studio Version With Overdubs)"	6:46
3.	"I Talk to the Wind (Alt 2019 Mix)"	6:35
4.	"I Talk to the Wind (Duo Version 2019 Mix)"	7:17
5.	"Epitaph (Isolated Vocal 2019 Mix)"	5:44
6.	"Epitaph (Alternate Take 2019 Mix)"	9:30
7.	"Moonchild (Take One 2019 Mix)"	2:21
8.	"The Court of the Crimson King (Take 3 2019 Mix)"	7:10
9.	"21st Century Schizoid Man (Trio Version 2019 Mix)"	7:05

CD 10 - In the Court of the Crimson King 2009 Stereo Mix
No.	Title	Length
1.	"21st Century Schizoid Man"	7:23
2.	"I Talk to the Wind"	6:01
3.	"Epitaph"	8:52
4.	"Moonchild"	9:02
5.	"The Court of the Crimson King"	9:31
6.	"Moonchild [Full Version]"	12:15
7.	"I Talk to the Wind [Duo Version]"	4:56
8.	"I Talk to the Wind [Alternate Mix]"	6:37
9.	"Epitaph [Backing Track]"	9:05
10.	"Wind Session [21st Century Schizoid Man Intro]"	4:31

CD 11 - In the Court of the Crimson King, 2019 Stereo Mixes & Instrumental Mixes
No.	Title	Length
1.	"21st Century Schizoid Man"	7:22
2.	"I Talk To The Wind"	6:04
3.	"Epitaph"	8:47
4.	"Moonchild"	12:12
5.	"The Court of the Crimson King"	9:24
6.	"21st Century Schizoid Man"	7:24
7.	"I Talk To The Wind"	6:08
8.	"Epitaph"	8:56
9.	"Moonchild (Edit)"	2:28
10.	"The Court of the Crimson King"	9:21

CD 12 - Let's Make A Hit Waxing
No.	Title	Length
1.	"Let's Make A Hit Waxing"	68:10

CD 13 - Sessions (June 12 - July 9)
No.	Title	Length
1.	"21st Century Schizoid Man (Morgan Studio Instrumental)"	6:46
2.	"Epitaph Takes 1 To 3"	24:31
3.	"Epitaph Takes 4 To 8"	12:04
4.	"I Talk To The Wind Takes 1 To 4"	14:14

CD 14 - Sessions (July 9 - July 10)
No.	Title	Length
1.	"I Talk to the Wind Takes 5 To 8"	27:41
2.	"I Talk to the Wind Takes 9 To 12"	25:37
3.	"The Court of the Crimson King Stereo Takes"	25:43

CD 15 - Sessions (July 10 - July 16)
No.	Title	Length
1.	"The Court of the Crimson King Take 6"	9:38
2.	"The Court of the Crimson King Take 1 and 2"	13:52
3.	"The Court of the Crimson King Takes 3 to 7"	31:10
4.	"The Court of the Crimson King Takes 8 to 10"	17:11
5.	"The Court of the Crimson King Trailer Take 1"	2:37

CD 16 - Sessions (July 21)
No.	Title	Length
1.	"The Court of the Crimson King (Stormy Mix)"	2:04
2.	"I Talk to the Wind Takes 3 to 6"	25:38
3.	"I Talk to the Wind Takes 7 to 9"	22:03
4.	"I Talk to the Wind Early Take"	4:39
5.	"Drum Check"	1:38
6.	"21st Century Schizoid Man Sax Soundcheck"	2:55
7.	"Ahh (Stormy Mix)"	1:05
8.	"I Talk to the Wind (Stormy Mix)"	4:16

CD 17 - Sessions (July 30)
No.	Title	Length
1.	"Epitaph Takes 1 to 3"	28:25
2.	"Epitaph Takes 5 to 11"	24:27
3.	"Epitaph Take 2 (Stormy Mix)"	9:54

CD 18 - Sessions (July 31 - August 13)
No.	Title	Length
1.	"Moonchild Takes 1 To 8"	21:14
2.	"Moonchild Take 9 (Complete)"	12:35
3.	"Trailer Take And Take Overdubbed"	3:48
4.	"Pipe Organ Takes"	1:45
5.	"Wind Noise Takes"	17:17
6.	"The Court of the Crimson King Takes"	19:24

DVD 1
No.	Title	Length
1.	"21st Century Schizoid Man Morgan Studio Instrumental (MLP Lossless Stereo (24/48), LPCM Stereo (24/48)"
2.	"Epitaph Takes 1 To 3 (MLP Lossless Stereo (24/48), LPCM Stereo (24/48)"
3.	"Epitaph Takes 4 To 8 (MLP Lossless Stereo (24/48), LPCM Stereo (24/48)"
4.	"I Talk To The Wind Takes 1 To 4 (MLP Lossless Stereo (24/48), LPCM Stereo (24/48)"
5.	"I Talk To The Wind Takes 5 To 8 (MLP Lossless Stereo (24/48), LPCM Stereo (24/48)"
6.	"I Talk To The Wind Takes 9 To 12 (MLP Lossless Stereo (24/48), LPCM Stereo (24/48)"
7.	"The Court of the Crimson King Stereo Takes (MLP Lossless Stereo (24/48), LPCM Stereo (24/48)"
8.	"The Court of the Crimson King Take 6 (MLP Lossless Stereo (24/48), LPCM Stereo (24/48)"
9.	"The Court of the Crimson King Take 1 and 2 (MLP Lossless Stereo (24/48), LPCM Stereo (24/48)"
10.	"The Court of the Crimson King Takes 3 to 7 (MLP Lossless Stereo (24/48), LPCM Stereo (24/48)"
11.	"The Court of the Crimson King Takes 8 to 10 (MLP Lossless Stereo (24/48), LPCM Stereo (24/48)"
12.	"The Court of the Crimson King Trailer Take 1 (MLP Lossless Stereo (24/48), LPCM Stereo (24/48)"
13.	"I Talk to the Wind Early Take (MLP Lossless Stereo (24/48), LPCM Stereo (24/48)"
14.	"I Talk to the Wind Takes 3 To 6 (MLP Lossless Stereo (24/48), LPCM Stereo (24/48)"
15.	"I Talk to the Wind Takes 7 To 9 (MLP Lossless Stereo (24/48), LPCM Stereo (24/48)"
16.	"21st Century Schizoid Man Sax Soundcheck (MLP Lossless Stereo (24/48), LPCM Stereo (24/48)"
17.	"Epitaph Takes 1 to 3 (MLP Lossless Stereo (24/48), LPCM Stereo (24/48)"
18.	"Epitaph Takes 5 to 11 (MLP Lossless Stereo (24/48), LPCM Stereo (24/48)"
19.	"Moonchild Takes 1 to 8 (MLP Lossless Stereo (24/48), LPCM Stereo (24/48)"
20.	"Moonchild Take 9 (MLP Lossless Stereo (24/48), LPCM Stereo (24/48)"
21.	"Trailer (Take) and Trailer (Take Overdubbed) (MLP Lossless Stereo (24/48), LPCM Stereo (24/48)"
22.	"Pipe Organ Takes (MLP Lossless Stereo (24/48), LPCM Stereo (24/48)"
23.	"Wind Noise Takes (MLP Lossless Stereo (24/48), LPCM Stereo (24/48)"
24.	"The Court of the Crimson King Takes (MLP Lossless Stereo (24/48), LPCM Stereo (24/48)"
25.	"Let's Make a Hit Waxing (MLP Lossless Stereo (24/48), LPCM Stereo (24/48)"
26.	"The Court of the Crimson King (LPCM Stereo (16/48) Stormy Selections)"
27.	"Ahh (LPCM Stereo (16/48) Stormy Selections)"
28.	"I Talk to the Wind (LPCM Stereo (16/48) Stormy Selections)"
29.	"Epitaph Take 2 (LPCM Stereo (16/48) Stormy Selections)"

DVD 2
No.	Title	Length
1.	"21st Century Schizoid Man (MLP Lossless 5.1 Surround, DTS 5.1 Digital Surround)"
2.	"I Talk to the Wind (MLP Lossless 5.1 Surround, DTS 5.1 Digital Surround)"
3.	"Epitaph (MLP Lossless 5.1 Surround, DTS 5.1 Digital Surround)"
4.	"Moonchild (MLP Lossless 5.1 Surround, DTS 5.1 Digital Surround)"
5.	"The Court of the Crimson King (MLP Lossless 5.1 Surround, DTS 5.1 Digital Surround)"
6.	"21st Century Schizoid Man (MLP Lossless Stereo (24/48), LPCM Stereo (24/48)"
7.	"I Talk To The Wind (MLP Lossless Stereo (24/48), LPCM Stereo (24/48)"
8.	"Epitaph (MLP Lossless Stereo (24/48), LPCM Stereo (24/48)"
9.	"Moonchild (MLP Lossless Stereo (24/48), LPCM Stereo (24/48)"
10.	"The Court of the Crimson King (MLP Lossless Stereo (24/48), LPCM Stereo (24/48)"
11.	"21st Century Schizoid Man (Original Master Edition)"
12.	"I Talk To The Wind (Original Master Edition)"
13.	"Epitaph (Original Master Edition)"
14.	"Moonchild (Original Master Edition)"
15.	"The Court of the Crimson King (Original Master Edition)"
16.	"Hyde Park Film Snippet"

Blu-Ray Disc 1
No.	Title	Length
1.	"Tremelo Study in a Major (Spanish Suite) (LPCM Stereo (24/192), as Giles, Giles and Fripp)"
2.	"Suite No. 1 (LPCM Stereo (24/192), as Giles, Giles and Fripp)"
3.	"Scrivens (LPCM Stereo (24/192), as Giles, Giles and Fripp)"
4.	"Why Don't You Just Drop In (i) (LPCM Stereo (24/192), as Giles, Giles and Fripp)"
5.	"I Talk to the Wind (i) (LPCM Stereo (24/192), as Giles, Giles and Fripp)"
6.	"Plastic Pennies (LPCM Stereo (24/192), as Giles, Giles and Fripp)"
7.	"Passages of Time (LPCM Stereo (24/192), as Giles, Giles and Fripp)"
8.	"Under the Sky (ii) (LPCM Stereo (24/192), as Giles, Giles and Fripp)"
9.	"I Talk o the Wind (ii) (LPCM Stereo (24/192), as Giles, Giles and Fripp)"
10.	"Erudite Eyes (LPCM Stereo (24/192), as Giles, Giles and Fripp)"
11.	"Make It Today (ii) (LPCM Stereo (24/192), as Giles, Giles and Fripp)"
12.	"Wonderland (LPCM Stereo (24/192), as Giles, Giles and Fripp)"
13.	"Why Don't You Just Drop In (ii) (LPCM Stereo (24/192), as Giles, Giles and Fripp)"
14.	"She Is Loaded (LPCM Stereo (24/192), as Giles, Giles and Fripp)"
15.	"21st Century Schizoid Man Morgan Studio Instrumental (LPCM Stereo (24/96)"
16.	"Epitaph Takes 1 To 3 (LPCM Stereo (24/96)"
17.	"Epitaph Takes 4 To 8 (LPCM Stereo (24/96)"
18.	"I Talk to the Wind Takes 1 To 4 (LPCM Stereo (24/96)"
19.	"I Talk to the Wind Takes 5 To 8 (LPCM Stereo (24/96)"
20.	"I Talk to the Wind Takes 9 To 12 (LPCM Stereo (24/96)"
21.	"The Court of the Crimson King Stereo Takes (LPCM Stereo (24/96)"
22.	"The Court of the Crimson King Take 6 (LPCM Stereo (24/96)"
23.	"The Court of the Crimson King Take 1 and 2 (LPCM Stereo (24/96)"
24.	"The Court of the Crimson King Takes 3 to 7 (LPCM Stereo (24/96)"
25.	"The Court of the Crimson King Takes 8 to 10 (LPCM Stereo (24/96)"
26.	"The Court of the Crimson King Trailer Take 1 (LPCM Stereo (24/96)"
27.	"I Talk to the Wind Early Take (LPCM Stereo (24/96)"
28.	"I Talk to the Wind Takes 3 To 6 (LPCM Stereo (24/96)"
29.	"I Talk to the Wind Takes 7 To 9 (LPCM Stereo (24/96)"
30.	"21st Century Schizoid Man Sax Sound Check (LPCM Stereo (24/96)"
31.	"Epitaph Takes 1 to 3 (LPCM Stereo (24/96)"
32.	"Epitaph Takes 5 to 11 (LPCM Stereo (24/96)"
33.	"Moonchild Takes 1 to 8 (LPCM Stereo (24/96)"
34.	"Moonchild Take 9 (LPCM Stereo (24/96)"
35.	"Trailer (Take) and Trailer (Take Overdubbed) (LPCM Stereo (24/96)"
36.	"Pipe Organ Takes (LPCM Stereo (24/96)"
37.	"Wind Noise Takes (LPCM Stereo (24/96)"
38.	"The Court of the Crimson King Takes (LPCM Stereo (24/96)"
39.	"21st Century Schizoid Man (LPCM Stereo (24/192), Live at Chesterfield September 6, 1969)"
40.	"Drop In (LPCM Stereo (24/192), Live at Chesterfield September 6, 1969)"
41.	"Epitaph (LPCM Stereo (24/192), Live at Chesterfield September 6, 1969)"
42.	"Get Thy Bearings (LPCM Stereo (24/192), Live at Chesterfield September 6, 1969)"
43.	"I Talk to the Wind (LPCM Stereo (24/192), Live at Chesterfield September 6, 1969)"
44.	"The Court of the Crimson King (LPCM Stereo (24/192), Live at Chesterfield September 6, 1969)"
45.	"Mantra (LPCM Stereo (24/192), Live at Chesterfield September 6, 1969)"
46.	"Travel Weary Capricorn (LPCM Stereo (24/192), Live at Chesterfield September 6, 1969)"
47.	"Improv (LPCM Stereo (24/192), Live at Chesterfield September 6, 1969)"
48.	"Mars (LPCM Stereo (24/192), Live at Chesterfield September 6, 1969)"
49.	"The Court of the Crimson King (LPCM Stereo (16/48), Additional Material)"
50.	"Ahh (LPCM Stereo (16/48), Additional Material)"
51.	"I Talk to the Wind (LPCM Stereo (16/48), Additional Material)"
52.	"Epitaph Take 2 (LPCM Stereo (16/48), Additional Material)"

Blu-Ray Disc 2
No.	Title	Length
1.	"21st Century Schizoid Man (2009 Mixes DTS-HD Master Surround, LPCM 5.1 Surround)"
2.	"I Talk to the Wind (2009 Mixes DTS-HD Master Surround, LPCM 5.1 Surround)"
3.	"Epitaph (2009 Mixes DTS-HD Master Surround, LPCM 5.1 Surround)"
4.	"Moonchild (2009 Mixes DTS-HD Master Surround, LPCM 5.1 Surround)"
5.	"The Court of the Crimson King (2009 Mixes DTS-HD Master Surround, LPCM 5.1 Surround)"
6.	"21st Century Schizoid Man (2009 Mixes LPCM Stereo (24/96)"
7.	"I Talk To The Wind (2009 Mixes LPCM Stereo (24/96)"
8.	"Epitaph (2009 Mixes LPCM Stereo (24/96)"
9.	"Moonchild (2009 Mixes LPCM Stereo (24/96)"
10.	"The Court of the Crimson King (2009 Mixes LPCM Stereo (24/96)"
11.	"Moonchild [Full Version] (2009 Mixes LPCM Stereo (24/96)"
12.	"I Talk to the Wind [Duo Version] (2009 Mixes LPCM Stereo (24/96)"
13.	"I Talk to the Wind [Alternate Mix] (2009 Mixes LPCM Stereo (24/96)"
14.	"Epitaph [Backing Track] (2009 Mixes LPCM Stereo (24/96)"
15.	"Wind Session (2009 Mixes LPCM Stereo (24/96)"
16.	"21st Century Schizoid Man (Instrumental) (The Alternative Album LPCM Stereo (24/96)"
17.	"I Talk to the Wind (Studio Run Through) (The Alternative Album LPCM Stereo (24/96)"
18.	"Epitaph (Alternative Version) (The Alternative Album LPCM Stereo (24/96)"
19.	"Moonchild (Take 1) (The Alternative Album LPCM Stereo (24/96)"
20.	"The Court of the Crimson King (Take 3) (The Alternative Album LPCM Stereo (24/96)"
21.	"21st Century Schizoid Man (LPCM (24/48) Vinyl Transfers UK Island)"
22.	"I Talk To The Wind (LPCM (24/48) Vinyl Transfers UK Island)"
23.	"Epitaph (LPCM (24/48) Vinyl Transfers UK Island)"
24.	"Moonchild (LPCM (24/48) Vinyl Transfers UK Island)"
25.	"The Court of the Crimson King (LPCM (24/48) Vinyl Transfers UK Island)"
26.	"The Court of the Crimson King (Single A Side) (LPCM (24/48) Vinyl Transfers UK Island)"
27.	"The Court of the Crimson King (Single B Side) (LPCM (24/48) Vinyl Transfers UK Island)"
28.	"21st Century Schizoid Man (LPCM (24/48) Vinyl Transfers Mono Promo)"
29.	"I Talk to the Wind (LPCM (24/48) Vinyl Transfers Mono Promo)"
30.	"Epitaph (LPCM (24/48) Vinyl Transfers Mono Promo)"
31.	"Moonchild (LPCM (24/48) Vinyl Transfers Mono Promo)"
32.	"The Court of the Crimson King (LPCM (24/48) Vinyl Transfers Mono Promo)"
33.	"The Court of the Crimson King (Promo A Side) (LPCM (24/48) Vinyl Transfers Mono Promo)"

Blu-Ray Disc 3
No.	Title	Length
1.	"21st Century Schizoid Man (DTS-HD Master Surround, LPCM 5.1 Surround)"
2.	"I Talk To The Wind (DTS-HD Master Surround, LPCM 5.1 Surround)"
3.	"Epitaph (DTS-HD Master Surround, LPCM 5.1 Surround)"
4.	"Moonchild (DTS-HD Master Surround, LPCM 5.1 Surround)"
5.	"The Court of the Crimson King (DTS-HD Master Surround, LPCM 5.1 Surround)"
6.	"21st Century Schizoid Man (LPCM (24/96) Stereo Mixes)"
7.	"I Talk to the Wind (LPCM (24/96) Stereo Mixes)"
8.	"Epitaph (LPCM (24/96) Stereo Mixes)"
9.	"Moonchild (LPCM (24/96) Stereo Mixes)"
10.	"The Court of the Crimson King (LPCM (24/96) Stereo Mixes)"
11.	"21st Century Schizoid Man (Instrumental Mixes)"
12.	"I Talk To The Wind (Instrumental Mixes)"
13.	"Epitaph (Instrumental Mixes)"
14.	"Moonchild (Instrumental Mixes)"
15.	"The Court of the Crimson King (Instrumental Mixes)"
16.	"21st Century Schizoid Man (Original Master Edition)"
17.	"I Talk to the Wind (Original Master Edition)"
18.	"Epitaph (Original Master Edition)"
19.	"Moonchild (Original Master Edition)"
20.	"The Court of the Crimson King (Original Master Edition)"
21.	"21st Century Schizoid Man (Morgan Studio Version With Overdubs)"
22.	"I Talk To The Wind (Alternative 2019 Mix)"
23.	"I Talk To The Wind Duo Version (2019 Mix)"
24.	"Epitaph Isolated Vocal (2019 Mix)"
25.	"Epitaph Alternative Take (2019 Mix)"
26.	"Moonchild (Take 1, 2019 Mix)"
27.	"The Court of the Crimson King (Take 3, 2019 Mix)"
28.	"Wind Session (96/24 LPCM Stereo Additional Material)"
29.	"21st Century Schizoid Man Trio Version 2019 Mix (96/24 LPCM Stereo Additional Material)"
30.	"I Talk To The Wind Studio Run Through, 2019 Mix (96/24 LPCM Stereo Additional Material)"
31.	"Epitaph Backing Track, 2019 Mix (96/24 LPCM Stereo Additional Material)"
32.	"Moonchild Album Edit, 2009 Mix (96/24 LPCM Stereo Additional Material)"
33.	"The Court of the Crimson King Take 3 2009 Mix (96/24 LPCM Stereo Additional Material)"
34.	"21st Century Schizoid Man Morgan Studios Instrumental Take, 1969 (96/24 LPCM Stereo Additional Material)"
35.	"The Court of the Crimson King Part 1 (96/24 LPCM Stereo Additional Material)"
36.	"The Court of the Crimson King Part 2 (96/24 LPCM Stereo Additional Material)"
37.	"Hyde Park Film Snippet Audio Mono"

Blu-Ray Disc 4
No.	Title	Length
1.	"21st Century Schizoid Man (2020 Mixes Dolby Atmos (24/48)"
2.	"I Talk to the Wind (2020 Mixes Dolby Atmos (24/48)"
3.	"Epitaph (2020 Mixes Dolby Atmos (24/48)"
4.	"Moonchild (2020 Mixes Dolby Atmos (24/48)"
5.	"The Court of the Crimson King (2020 Mixes Dolby Atmos (24/48)"
6.	"I Talk to the Wind Duo Version (DTS-HD Master Surround LPCM 5.1 Surround (24/96)"
7.	"Let's Make a Hit Waxing (lPCM Stereo (24/96)"

CD 19 - Giles, Giles, and Fripp
No.	Title	Length
1.	"Tremelo Study In A Major (Spanish Suite)"	1:41
2.	"Suite No. 1"	5:36
3.	"Scrivens"	2:15
4.	"Why Don't You Just Drop In (i)"	3:43
5.	"I Talk To The Wind (i)"	3:22
6.	"Plastic Pennies"	2:22
7.	"Passages Of Time"	3:34
8.	"Under The Sky (ii)"	2:52
9.	"I Talk To The Wind (ii)"	3:15
10.	"Erudite Eyes"	6:49
11.	"Make It Today (ii)"	4:49
12.	"Wonderland"	6:09
13.	"Why Don't You Just Drop In (ii)"	3:42
14.	"She is Loaded"	3:15

CD 20 - BBC Sessions / Live at Fairfield Hall, Croydon, October 17, 1969
No.	Title	Length
1.	"21st Century Schizoid Man"	7:08
2.	"Epitaph"	7:09
3.	"The Court Of The Crimson King"	6:29
4.	"I Talk To The Wind"	4:39
5.	"Get Thy Bearings"	5:54
6.	"Trees"	18:59

== Personnel ==
King Crimson

- Robert Fripp – electric guitar, acoustic guitar
- Ian McDonald – alto saxophone, flute, clarinet, bass clarinet, vibraphone, Mellotron Mk II, reed organ, piano, harpsichord, vocals
- Greg Lake – bass guitar, lead vocals
- Michael Giles – drums, percussion, vocals
- Peter Sinfield – words & illumination
