= Bertha (song) =

Song by Grateful Dead

from the album Grateful Dead
- A-side: "One More Saturday Night"
- Recorded: April 27, 1971
- Venue: Fillmore East (New York)
- Genre: Rock
- Length: 5:27
- Label: Warner Bros.
- Composer: Jerry Garcia
- Lyricist: Robert Hunter
- Producer: Grateful Dead

"Bertha" is a song by American rock band the Grateful Dead. It was released on September 24, 1971, as one of the three new songs on the band's second live album Grateful Dead. It was written by lead guitarist and vocalist Jerry Garcia with lyricist Robert Hunter. The original album version was recorded on April 27, 1971, at the Fillmore East in New York, and is the release's opening track. It also appeared as the B-side to the "One More Saturday Night" single the following year.

"Bertha" has received a positive reception from fans and critics, being considered one of the band's best songs. It remained a staple of the band's setlists from its introduction in 1971 to their dissolution in 1995.

== Overview ==
"Bertha" was originally debuted in concert on February 18, 1971, at the Capitol Theatre in Port Chester, New York. Matt Mitchell of Paste describes its lyrics as "a biting and surreal lover's lament". In a column for the band's official website, David Dodd includes "Bertha" in a group of songs which "deepen and further explore the "old, weird America" of many of the songs from Workingman's Dead and American Beauty". He considers the song's titular character to be "yet another of [Robert] Hunter's loveable but somehow downtrodden or down-and-out characters", characterized as both "defiant" and "bumbling". A popular rumor claims that the song was inspired by a faulty fan located within the band's office; however, this has been refuted by Hunter. Instead, he suggested that the lyrics constitute "some vaguer connotation of birth, death, and reincarnation". Dodd notes that the musical backing contrasts with this lyrical subject, calling it "certainly a non-dreamy, rocking song about those topics."

== Reception and legacy ==
"Bertha" has received a positive reception, being considered a fan favorite and being included on lists of the band's best songs. Mitchell listed the track as the band's 16th best song, calling it "quintessential Grateful Dead" and highlighting Garcia's solo, Merl Saunders' organ, and Phil Lesh's bass playing. Ultimate Classic Rock ranked the song as the band's 9th best, similarly highlighting Saunders' and Garcia's performances. The song placed sixth in a Rolling Stone list of the 50 greatest Jerry Garcia songs, calling it "one of the Dead's surefire roof-raisers" which typically "kick[ed] off the first set with a blast of primal rock & roll boogie".

An action figure based on the cover of Grateful Dead and named "Bertha" was released in 2021. The song also provides the name of BERTHA: Grateful Drag, a drag-themed Grateful Dead cover band from Nashville.
