= Dick's Picks Volume 33 =

Live album by Grateful Dead
- Released: November 15, 2004
- Recorded: October 9 and 10, 1976
- Genre: Rock
- Length: 310:02
- Label: Grateful Dead

Grateful Dead chronology
Beyond Description (1973–1989) (2004)	Dick's Picks Volume 33 (2004)	Dick's Picks Volume 34 (2005)

Professional ratings
Review scores
Source	Rating
Allmusic	4/5 stars
The Music Box	4/5 stars

Dick's Picks Volume 33 is the 33rd installment of the Dick's Pick's series of Grateful Dead concert recordings. It is a four CD set that contains two consecutive complete shows, recorded on October 9 and October 10, 1976 at Oakland Coliseum Stadium in Oakland, California.

These two shows were part of the "Day on the Green" series organized by concert promoter Bill Graham. Each of the two Grateful Dead concerts was followed by a concert by the Who. At the intermission between the Dead and the Who, Wavy Gravy spoke to promote the 1976 "Nobody for President" campaign.

== Booklet and reviews ==
The release includes six sheets of paper stapled together in the middle yielding a 24-page booklet. The front duplicates the cover of the CD and the back features a black-and-white photograph of the crowd at one of the shows. The last two pages list the contents of and credits for the release.

Most of the booklet is composed of photographs of the band performing on stage, but it also includes two newspaper clippings. Some of the photos are in black-and-white and others in color, and some of the photos are larger and take up two pages, while others form photomontages that spread across two pages.

=== Review in the California Aggie ===
A review from The California Aggie takes up most of four pages in the booklet. Written by Steven Crozier, it was originally published on October 12, 1976, and bears the title "Day on the green number 8 the music never stopped". In addition to the Grateful Dead's show that day, the review also covers the show performed by The Who, devoting about the same amount of space to each band.

Crozier writes that "Though unfamiliar with nearly half the songs [that the Dead performed], I found myself getting caught up in every one." He pivots from his review of the Dead's contribution to the Who's performance by acknowledging how different the two bands are in their approach: "Where the Dead rely (and rightfully so) completely on their music ... the Who lean as heavily on their stage presence as on their music".

Crozier closes his piece on a positive note, stating it was "An incredible day musically, all in all." Denying that there "was any contest" between the two, he nonetheless concludes he "felt the Dead really carried the day" by being "a more accessible band, a more human band, if you will".

=== Review in the Idaho Free Press & The News Tribune ===
The review in The Idaho Free Press & The News Tribune is much shorter, taking up barely two pages in the booklet. It was published October 23, 1976, is entitled "Grateful Dead and Who give Oakland fans a heavy rock tour of memory lane", and was written by sports writer Gary Schaffer, who "used his vacation to travel to California especially to see and hear two of his favorite bands in concert."

Schaffer describes the event as being "a breathtaking, even 'religious' experience for anyone who describes himself as a 'Deadhead' or a 'Pinball Wizard'." He pivots from the Dead's show to the Who's contribution by highlighting the bands' selection of music: "While the Dead spent the concert hopping from past to present, the Who used the entirety of their two hours of music to perform old numbers, with the lone exception of 'Squeeze Box'."

Having mentioned the titles of many of the songs each band played, Schaffer chooses to end his article by discussing more practical concerns. Writing that "The concert came off with typical [Bill] Graham efficiency" he closes his piece by stating the only difficulty was "trying to clear the large number of people from the Oakland Coliseum parking lot."

== Caveat emptor ==
Each volume of Dick's Picks has its own "caveat emptor" label, advising the listener of the sound quality of the recording. The one for volume 33 reads:

"This space is usually reserved to warn you of sound quality anomalies on these two-track recordings. Disregard that for this Dick's Pick. There aren't any. It sounds great. Enjoy."

== Track listing ==
Disc one
October 9, 1976 – first set:

1. "Promised Land" (Chuck Berry) – 4:21
2. "Mississippi Half-Step Uptown Toodeloo" (Jerry Garcia, Robert Hunter) – 9:19
3. "Cassidy" (Bob Weir, John Barlow) – 4:28
4. "Tennessee Jed" (Garcia, Hunter) – 8:57
5. "Looks Like Rain" (Weir, Barlow) – 8:36
6. "They Love Each Other" (Garcia, Hunter) – 7:10
7. "New Minglewood Blues" (traditional, arranged by Bob Weir) – 4:51
8. "Scarlet Begonias" (Garcia, Hunter) – 12:19
9. "Lazy Lightnin' " (Weir, Barlow) – 3:18 ->
10. "Supplication" (Weir, Barlow) – 5:04
11. "Sugaree" (Garcia, Hunter) – 11:35

Disc two
October 9, 1976 – second set:

1. "St. Stephen" (Garcia, Phil Lesh, Hunter) – 5:57 ->
2. "Not Fade Away" (Buddy Holly, Norman Petty) – 11:55 ->
3. "St. Stephen" reprise (Garcia, Lesh, Hunter) – 0:50 ->
4. "Help on the Way" (Garcia, Hunter) – 5:36 ->
5. "Slipknot!" (Garcia, Keith Godchaux, Bill Kreutzmann, Lesh, Weir) – 5:23 ->
6. "Drums" (Mickey Hart, Kreutzmann) – 3:23 ->
7. "Samson and Delilah" (traditional, arranged by Bob Weir) – 7:17 ->
8. "Slipknot!" reprise (Garcia, K. Godchaux, Kreutzmann, Lesh, Weir) – 6:48 ->
9. "Franklin's Tower" (Garcia, Kreutzmann, Hunter) – 12:43 ->
10. "One More Saturday Night" (Weir) – 5:27

October 9, 1976 – encore:

11. "U.S. Blues" (Garcia, Hunter) – 6:16

Disc three
October 10, 1976 – first set:

1. "Might As Well" (Garcia, Hunter) – 6:34
2. "Mama Tried" (Merle Haggard) – 3:17
3. "Ramble On Rose" (Garcia, Hunter) – 7:10
4. "Cassidy" (Weir, Barlow) – 4:46
5. "Deal" (Garcia, Hunter) – 5:18
6. "El Paso" (Marty Robbins) – 4:53
7. "Loser" (Garcia, Hunter) – 7:40
8. "Promised Land" (Berry) – 4:32
9. "Friend of the Devil" (Garcia, Dawson, Hunter) – 8:34
10. "Dancing in the Streets" (William "Mickey" Stevenson, Marvin Gaye, Ivy Jo Hunter) – 14:40 ->
11. "Wharf Rat" (Garcia, Hunter) – 7:54 ->
12. "Dancing in the Streets" reprise (Stevenson, Gaye, I. Hunter) – 4:19

Disc four
October 10, 1976 – second set:

1. "Samson and Delilah" (traditional, arranged by Bob Weir) – 7:47
2. "Brown-Eyed Woman" (Garcia, Hunter) – 5:39
3. "Playing in the Band" (Weir, Hart, Hunter) – 10:58 ->
4. "Drums" (Hart, Kreutzmann) – 2:10 ->
5. "The Wheel" (Garcia, Kreutzmann, Hunter) – 5:50 ->
6. "Space" (Garcia, Lesh, Weir) – 4:48 ->
7. "The Other One" (Weir, Kreutzmann) – 9:25 ->
8. "Stella Blue" (Garcia, Hunter) – 12:02 ->
9. "Playing in the Band" reprise (Weir, Hart, Hunter) – 5:50 ->
10. "Sugar Magnolia" (Weir, Hunter) – 10:13

October 10, 1976 – encore:

11. "Johnny B. Goode" (Berry) – 4:04

== Personnel ==
=== Grateful Dead ===
- Jerry Garcia – lead guitar, vocals
- Donna Jean Godchaux – vocals
- Keith Godchaux – piano
- Mickey Hart – drums
- Bill Kreutzmann – drums
- Phil Lesh – electric bass
- Bob Weir – rhythm guitar, vocals

=== Production ===
- Betty Cantor-Jackson – recording
- David Lemieux – tape archivist
- Jeffrey Norman – CD mastering
- Eileen Law – archival research
- Richard McCaffrey – photography
- Ed Perlstein – photography
- Steve Schneider – photography
- Robert Minkin – package design and layout

== See also ==
- 2004 in music
