= Fillmore East =

Music venue in New York City (1968–71)

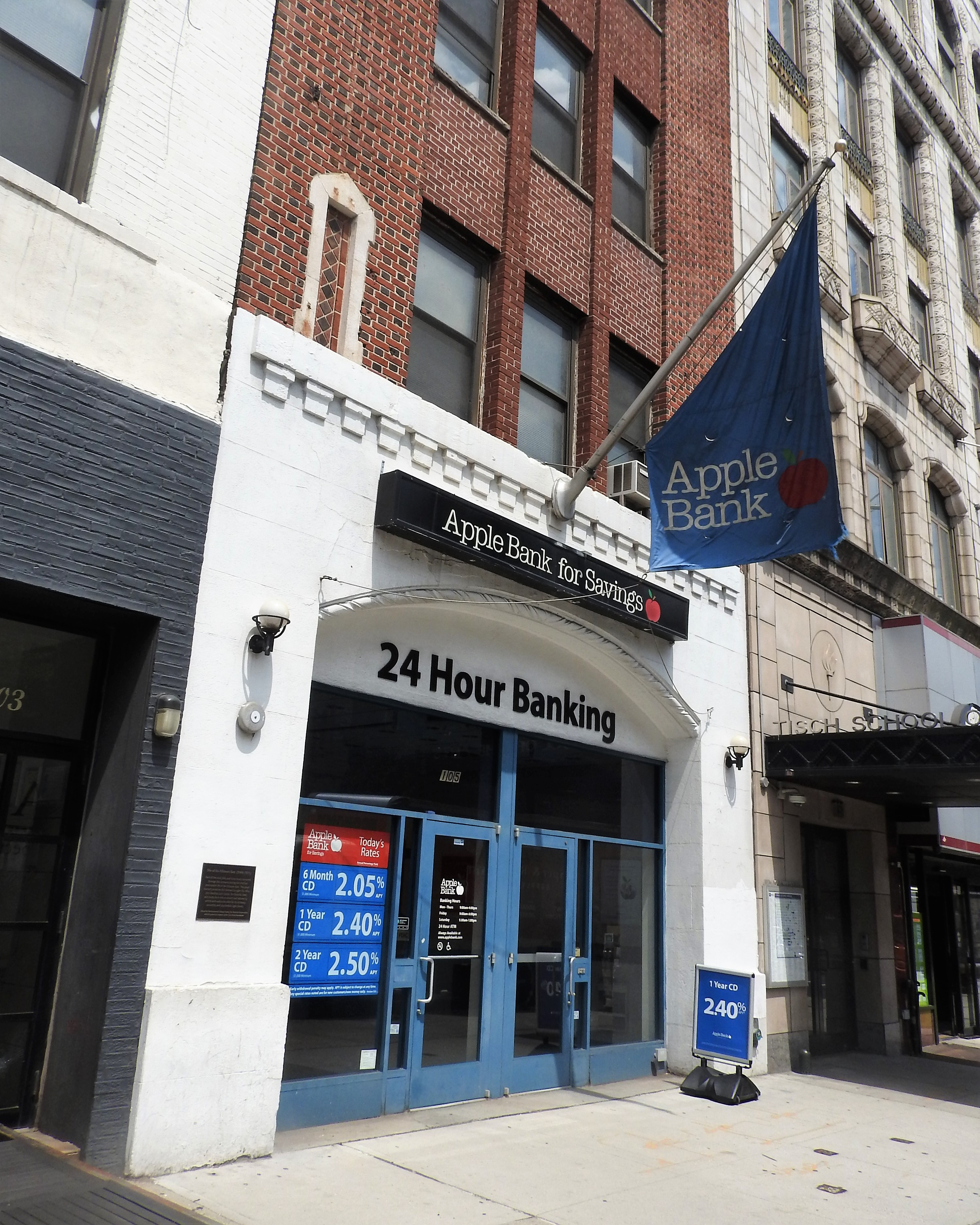
- The entrance to the Fillmore East, formerly an Apple Bank branch. Closed as of April 2026.
- Interactive map of Fillmore East
- Former names: Commodore Theater; Village Theater
- Location: 105 Second Avenue at 6th Street; Manhattan, New York City, U.S.
- Coordinates: 40.7276°N 73.9886°W
- Capacity: 2,654
- Type: Concert Hall
- Event: Rock

Construction
- Opened: March 8, 1968
- Closed: June 27, 1971

The Fillmore East was a rock music venue on Second Avenue near 6th Street in the East Village of Manhattan in New York City. In operation between March 8, 1968, and June 27, 1971, it belonged to then-top rock promoter Bill Graham, and featured some of the biggest acts of that time. The Fillmore East was an East Coast companion to Graham's West Coast venue, San Francisco's Fillmore Auditorium, and its successor, the Fillmore West.

== Pre–Fillmore East ==
The theatre at 105 Second Avenue that became the Fillmore East was originally built as a Yiddish theater in 1925–1926, designed by Harrison Wiseman in the Medieval Revival style, at a time when that section of Second Avenue was known as the "Yiddish Theater District" and the "Jewish Rialto" because of the numerous theatres that catered to a Yiddish-speaking audience. Called the Commodore Theater, and independently operated, it eventually was taken over by Loews Inc. and became a movie theater, the Loews Commodore. It later became the Village Theatre, owned by Roger Euster, with on-site management by Ben Barenholtz. When Bill Graham took over the theatre in 1968, it was unused and had fallen into disrepair. Despite the deceptively small front marquee and façade, the theater had a substantial capacity of almost 2,700.

== Fillmore East ==
The venue provided Graham with an East Coast counterpart to his existing Fillmore in San Francisco, California. Opening on March 8, 1968, the Fillmore East quickly became known as "The Church of Rock and Roll," with two-show, triple-bill concerts several nights a week. Graham would regularly alternate acts between the East and West Coast venues. Until early 1971, bands were booked to play two shows per night, at 8 pm and 11 pm, on both Friday and Saturday nights.

=== Notable acts ===
Among the notable acts to play the Fillmore East was Jimi Hendrix. His album Band of Gypsys was recorded live on New Year's Day 1970. British blues-rock trio Cream played the Fillmore East when it was called the "Village Theater" on September 20 & 23, 1967. On Saturday, February 15, 1969, Chuck Berry was headliner with Johnny Winter (billed simply as "Winter"), British blues-rock band Savoy Brown, and Aorta as the supporting acts. The following weekend, February 21–22, 1969, The Mothers of Invention, Buddy Miles Express, and Chicago played on the same bill. The Kinks played October 17 & 18, 1969, supported by the Bonzo Dog Band. Ike & Tina Turner played on January 9 & 10, 1970, supported by Fats Domino.

John Lennon and Yoko Ono sat in with Frank Zappa and the Mothers of Invention at the theater on June 6, 1971. The Allman Brothers Band played so many shows at Fillmore East that they were sometimes called "Bill Graham's house band"; additionally, the Grateful Dead played a total of 43 concerts at the theater from June 1968 through April 1971. Jefferson Airplane performed thirty-six shows (with member group Hot Tuna performing an additional four shows) and Taj Mahal played eight shows at the venue, while Crosby, Stills, Nash and Young did four shows in September 1969 and six performances in June 1970. Led Zeppelin made four appearances in early 1969, opening for Iron Butterfly. Amateur film footage of their January 31 performance can be viewed at the Led Zeppelin website.

The Joshua Light Show, headed by Joshua White, was an integral part of many performances, with its psychedelic art lighting on a backdrop behind many live bands. From the summer of 1970, the Pig Light Show, under the direction of Marc L. Rubinstein, performed at the theater, becoming the de facto house light show.

National Educational Television taped a show on September 23, 1970, for broadcast. It featured The Byrds, Elvin Bishop Group, Albert King, Sha Na Na, Van Morrison with psychedelic light show by Joe's Lights (what The Joshua Light Show became known as after Joshua left in 1970). The Allman Brothers were also taped for broadcast but due to technical difficulties, the segment with them was not aired. The show, Welcome to Fillmore East, was aired on WNET channel 13 in NYC and simulcast on WNEW-FM radio on October 10, 1970, at 10:00 pm in the NYC area. A thirty-minute clip from that show of the Allmans can be seen on YouTube.

=== Live albums ===
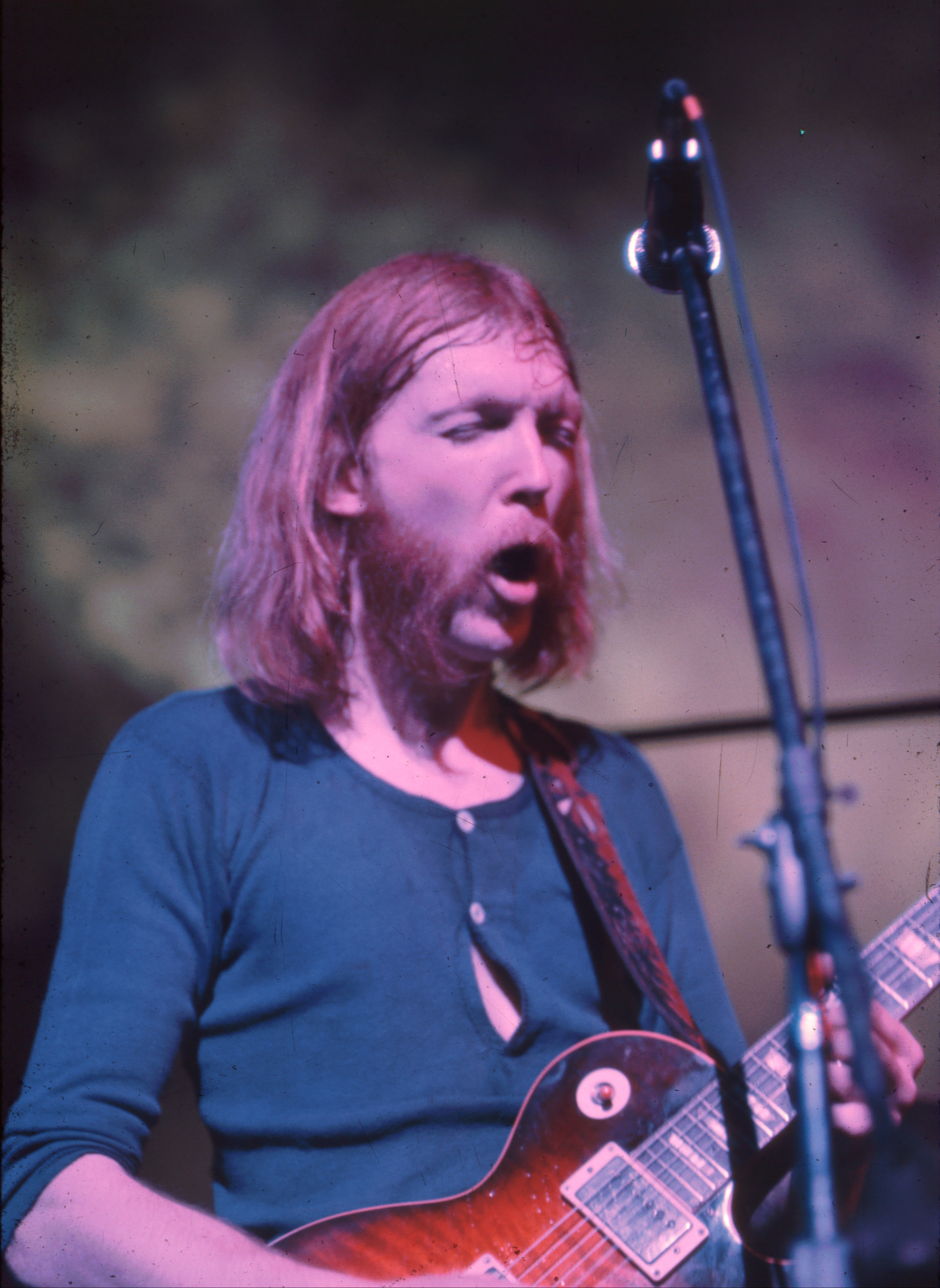
Duane Allman of the Allman Brothers on the Fillmore East's final weekend

As the Bill Graham's original Fillmore Auditorium on the West Coast, the Fillmore East quickly became an important venue on the fledgling rock music circuit in the late sixties. Because of its excellent acoustics, the enthusiastic and attentive audiences and Graham's innovative way of handling the concert environment, the hall became a favorite spot for the recording of many live albums. Gregg Allman and Dickey Betts, on why they recorded their first live album there: 'We realized that we got a better sound live and that we're a live band...And we realized that the audience was a big part of what we did. ... There was no question about where to record a concert. New York crowds have always been great, but what made the Fillmore special was Bill Graham. He was the best promoter rock has ever had and you could feel his influence in every little single thing at the Fillmore. It was just special. The bands felt it and the crowd felt it and it lit all of us up. The Fillmore was the high octane gig to play in New York – or anywhere else, really. ... It was a great sounding room with a great crowd... The Fillmores were so professionally run, compared to anything else at the time. And he would gamble on acts, bringing in jazz and blues ... and he had taken a chance on the Brothers.'

The list includes:

- The Allman Brothers Band: At Fillmore East. The breakthrough double album of the Allman Brothers Band, recorded on March 12 and 13, 1971, and released on Capricorn Records in July 1971. Producer Tom Dowd edited some of the performances down into the issued tracks and so showcased the group's terrific instrumental interplay.
- The Allman Brothers Band – Eat A Peach. The follow-up double album of studio and further Fillmore East Recordings, dedicated by the band to their lead guitar player Duane Allman, who died in a motorcycle crash shortly after the release and initial success of At Fillmore East. Released on Capricorn Records in February 1972.
- The Allman Brothers Band: Fillmore East, February 1970. In February 1970 the ABB played their second run of Fillmore East shows, supporting Grateful Dead and Love. The Grateful Dead sound engineer, Owsley "Bear" Stanley, recorded the soundboard live feed and in 1996 Grateful Dead Records released a CD of selected tracks from February 11 and 14. In 2018 the Owsley Stanley Foundation remastered this album and added a 3-CD set of the February 11, 13 and 14 performances as a 'Deluxe Edition', in their 'Bear's Sonic Journals'-series.
- The Allman Brothers Band: The 1971 Fillmore East Recordings. A six-CD set of the complete recordings of both early and late shows from March 12 and 13, 1971, and the Fillmore East closing show from June 27, 1971. The March 11 shows were also recorded, but deemed unusable by producer Tom Dowd as the band had, for the occasion, invited a horn section, but their contribution didn't gel with the group sound Released on Mercury in July 2014.
- Buffalo Bob Smith: Live at Bill Graham's Fillmore East; creator of Howdy Doody (recorded April 4, 1971)
- The Chambers Brothers: Love, Peace and Happiness, a double album with one studio disc and one live disc recorded at Bill Graham's Fillmore East
- Joe Cocker: Mad Dogs & Englishmen: The Complete Fillmore East Concerts, March 27–28, 1970. Six CD set released in 2006 on Hip-O Select.
- Crosby, Stills, Nash & Young: 4 Way Street. A double album, partly recorded at this venue during a six-night run in early June 1970, and released in April 1971 on Atlantic.
- Miles Davis: Live at the Fillmore East, March 7, 1970: It's About That Time. A two CD set of the early and late shows, recorded March 7, 1970, and released on Sony/Columbia Legacy in July 2001. This release is notable because this was saxophonist Wayne Shorter's last live date with Davis, after being nearly 6 years with the jazz star. The Sextet opened for Neil Young & Crazy Horse and The Steve Miller Blues Band for two nights at the Fillmore East: the first of several famous and important appearances of Davis at both the Fillmore East and West.
- Miles Davis: Miles Davis at Fillmore: Live at the Fillmore East. A double album of recordings of 4 shows, recorded June 17–20, 1970 and released by Columbia in October 1970. The Davis Septet opened for Laura Nyro for four nights at the auditorium. Columbia recorded all four nights, and producer Teo Macero distilled each night's music into the heavily edited medleys.
- Miles Davis: Miles at the Fillmore – Miles Davis 1970: The Bootleg Series Vol. 3. More of the above. A lavishly packaged four-CD set of the complete, unedited shows from June 17–20, 1970 (plus three bonus tracks from April 11, 1970, recorded at Fillmore West, San Francisco) and released in March 2014 by Sony/Columbia Legacy.
- Derek and the Dominos: In Concert; recorded October 23–24, 1970 (released 1973)
- Derek and the Dominos: Live at the Fillmore; recorded October 23–24, 1970 (released 1994)
- Flying Burrito Brothers: Authorized Bootleg: Fillmore East, N.Y., N.Y. Late Show, Nov 7, 1970 (CD, Feb-2011, Hip-O Select)
- Virgil Fox/Heavy Organ: Bach Live at Fillmore East; recorded December 1, 1970 (released on LP 1971, on CD 1989)
- The Fugs: Golden Filth – Alive at the Fillmore East; recorded June 1, 1968 (released on LP 1970, on CD as part of the Rhino Handmade 3-CD set, Electromagnetic Steamboat 2003)
- Grateful Dead: Grateful Dead a.k.a. Skull and Roses. A live double album of which seven of the 11 tracks were recorded at the Fillmore East, during their March 26 to 29, 1971 run, when they were supported by the New Riders Of The Purple Sage. Released on Warner Bros. in October 1971.
- Grateful Dead: History of the Grateful Dead, Volume One (Bear's Choice). This album includes Dead performances, recorded by then Dead-'sound wizard' Owsley 'Bear' Stanley, during a much acclaimed series of shows held over two nights, February 13–14, 1970 at the Fillmore East, headlining over the Allman Brothers Band and Love. Issued on Warner Bros. July 1973, it was to be a first in a series of archival releases, which was finally only picked up again in 1993 with the Dick's Picks Series. Re-released in an expanded edition, with 4 more tracks from the same shows in February 2003 by Rhino.
- Grateful Dead: Dick's Picks Volume Four – Fillmore East 2/13–14/70. (Much) more of the above. A three-disc set of additional tracks from both nights, February 13–14, 1970, 'the Dead's most memorable appearance at the Fillmore East, and shows consistently ranked by Deadheads as among the 5 best live tapes ever'. The 30-minute 'Dark Star' is considered one of the best ever performances of this legendary Dead improvisational theme. Released in March 1996 on Grateful Dead Records.
- Grateful Dead: Live at the Fillmore East 2-11-69. A double cd of the early and late shows on February 11, 1969, as the opening act to Janis Joplin's New York debut as a solo star. Released on Grateful Dead/Arista in October 1997.
- Grateful Dead: Ladies and Gentlemen... The Grateful Dead: Fillmore East – April 1971. Taken from the same 5-night run as Grateful Dead a.k.a. Skull And Roses, this four-disc set contains a much loved version of 'Hard to Handle', a mainstay of the Dead's live set from 1969 to 1971, as sung by Ron "Pigpen" McKernan, 'at the top of his game'. Released on Grateful Dead/Arista in October 2000.
- Grateful Dead: Road Trips Volume 3 Number 3 – Fillmore East 5-15-70 (2010). The three-disc set captures the band in the midst of their transition from a full tilt-psychedelic jam ethos to a wider, more song-based style, also featuring a short-lived 'unplugged' acoustic set. Released on Grateful Dead/Arista in October 2010, with a bonus fourth disc, with more music from the same night, included with early copies.
- Grateful Dead: Dave's Picks Volume 30 – Fillmore East, New York, NY-1/2/70 (2019); a three-disc CD set which comprises the early and late shows from 1/2/70 and five bonus tracks from 1/3/70. A fourth CD bonus disc of additional tracks from 1/3/70 was included for those who subscribed to the 2019 series on Dead.net
- Jimi Hendrix: Band of Gypsys (1970), Live at the Fillmore East (1999) and Machine Gun: The Fillmore East First Show (2016)
- Jimi Hendrix – Songs for Groovy Children: The Fillmore East Concerts (2019) The four Band Of Gypsys concerts from December 31, 1969 (early and late show) and January 1, 1970 (early and late show) on 5 CDs or 8 LPs, licensed to Sony Legacy by Experience Hendrix.
- Lorin Hollander: Lorin Hollander at the Fillmore East; recorded February 23, 1969
- Humble Pie: Performance Rockin' the Fillmore (1971). Performance Rockin' The Fillmore The Complete Recordings, a four disc CD set with the early and late shows from both 5/28/71 and 5/29/71 (released by Omnivore Recordings 2013)
- Incredible String Band: Live At The Fillmore 1968; recorded June 5, 1968; released by Hux Records Ltd, 2013.
- Iron Butterfly: Fillmore East 1968; a two disc set recorded on April 26 & 27, 1968; released by Rhino Entertainment 2011.
- Jefferson Airplane: Bless Its Pointed Little Head (1969) ; this album was split between the Fillmore East and Fillmore West.
- Jefferson Airplane: Live at the Fillmore East (recorded 1968; released 1998)
- Jefferson Airplane: Sweeping Up the Spotlight: Jefferson Airplane Live at the Fillmore East 1969 (released 2007)
- Janis Joplin: Fillmore East 1969 – recorded 2/12/69 (released June 2022 on Leftfield Media)
- King Crimson: Epitaph, two-disc set with three tracks recorded at Fillmore East November 21, 1969
- King Crimson: Live at Fillmore East, one disc with both Nov 21 and 22, 1969 partial sets (released in 2004 on The King Crimson Club label as Club 25)
- Al Kooper & Mike Bloomfield: Fillmore East: The Lost Concert Tapes; recorded Dec. 13–14, 1968 (released 2003)
- Love: Studio / Live, live tracks recorded at Fillmore East (released on LP 1982, on CD 1991)
- John Lennon and Yoko Ono: Live Jam, Side Two of this live album, which was included as a bonus album in Lennon & Ono's Some Time in New York City (released: 1972), was recorded at the Fillmore East on June 6, 1971.
- Taj Mahal: The Real Thing; recorded February 13, 1971 (remaster with one more track, released 2000)
- Mountain: Flowers of Evil, Side 2 recorded at Fillmore East, June 27, 1971
- John Mayall: The Turning Point (1969) (released on CD 1990, remaster with three more tracks released 2001)
- The Nice: Live at the Fillmore East December 1969; recorded December 19–20, 1969 (released 2009)
- Laura Nyro: Spread Your Wings and Fly: Live at the Fillmore East (released 2004)
- Quicksilver Messenger Service: Happy Trails; live tracks recorded at both Fillmore East & Fillmore West (CD released 1994)
- Santana: Fillmore East 1971 recorded April 3, 1971. (released 2020 on Timeline)
- Sly and the Family Stone: Live at the Fillmore East October 4th & 5th 1968 (released 2015)
- Ten Years After: Live at the Fillmore East 1970; recorded February 27–28, 1970 (released 2001)
- Traffic: John Barleycorn Must Die – Deluxe Edition; Two CD set, with the second disc containing seven songs on six tracks recorded Nov 18 & 19, 1970 at Fillmore East (released 2011 on Universal Island Records Ltd.)
- The Who: Live at the Fillmore East 1968; Two CD set, recorded April 6, 1968 (released 2018 on Polydor Ltd. (UK)
- Johnny Winter: Live Johnny Winter And; recorded at Fillmore East and Pirate's World, Dania, Florida (released 1971)
- Johnny Winter: Live at the Fillmore East 10/3/70 (released 2010)
- Neil Young & Crazy Horse: Live at the Fillmore East recorded March 6–7, 1970 (released on CD and DVD 2006)
- Frank Zappa and the Mothers of Invention: Freaks And Motherfu*#@%!, recorded in 1970 (released 1991)
- Frank Zappa's Mothers: Fillmore East – June 1971 (released 1971)

=== Closing ===
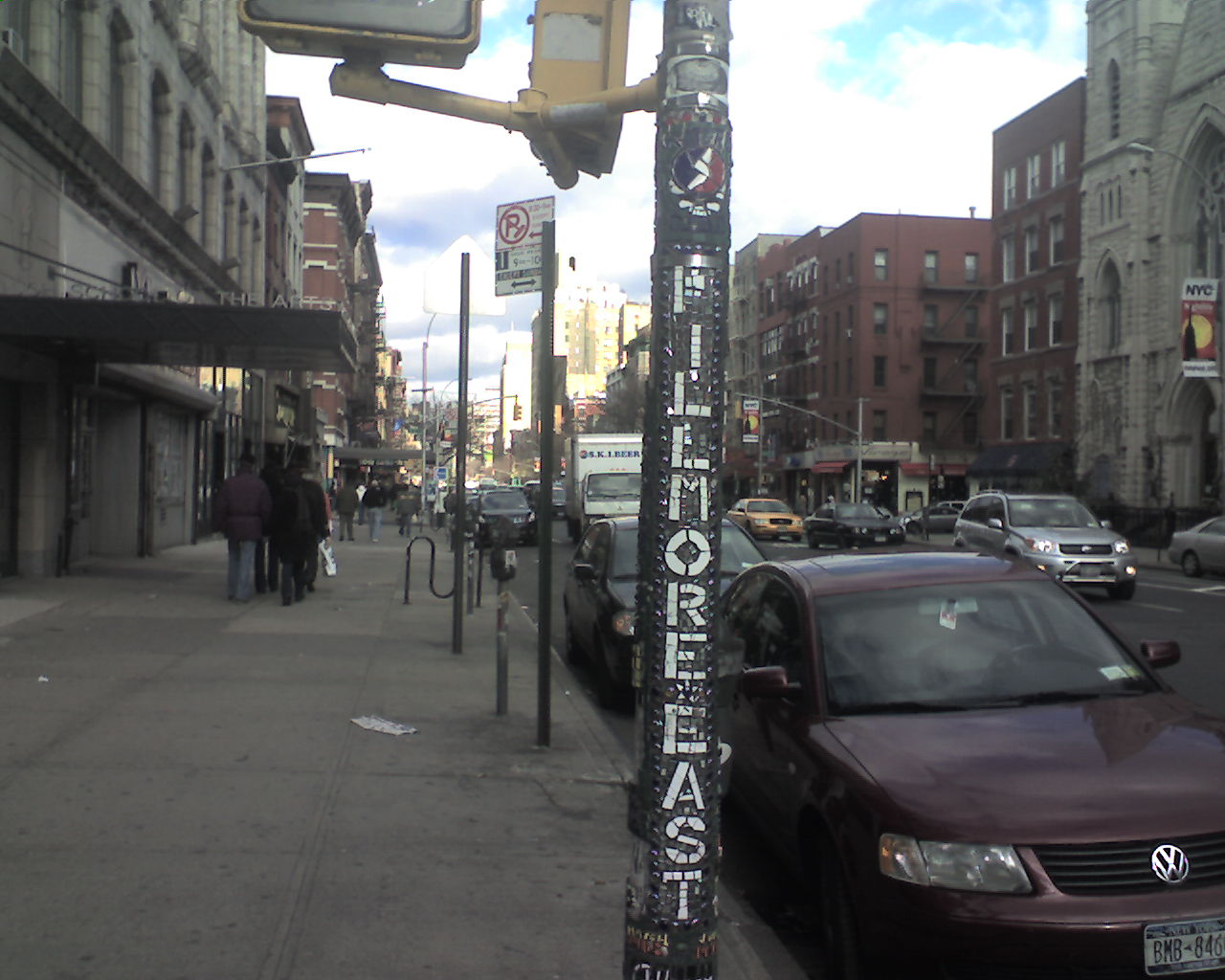
This signpost, along with a plaque on the façade, mark the former location of the Fillmore East.

Because of changes in the music industry and large growth in the concert industry, as exemplified by the increased prevalence of arena and stadium bookings, Graham closed the Fillmore East after only three years. The final concert took place on June 27, 1971, with three billed acts—the Allman Brothers Band, the J. Geils Band, and Albert King—and special surprise guests Edgar Winter's White Trash, Mountain, the Beach Boys, and Country Joe McDonald in an invitation-only performance.

The concert was simulcast live by New York City radio stations WPLJ and WNEW-FM, with between-set banter by many of New York City's then-trend-setting disc jockeys, including WPLJ's Dave Herman and Vin Scelsa and WNEW-FM's Scott Muni and Alison Steele.

The Allman Brothers Band set was released as the second disc of the deluxe edition/remastered version of their Eat a Peach (1972 and 2006) album.

In 2014, a six-disc set featuring the Allman Brothers Band's early and late shows at the Fillmore East from March 12 and 13, 1971, including their performance on the venue's final night of June 27, 1971, was issued as The 1971 Fillmore East Recordings.

== Afterlife ==
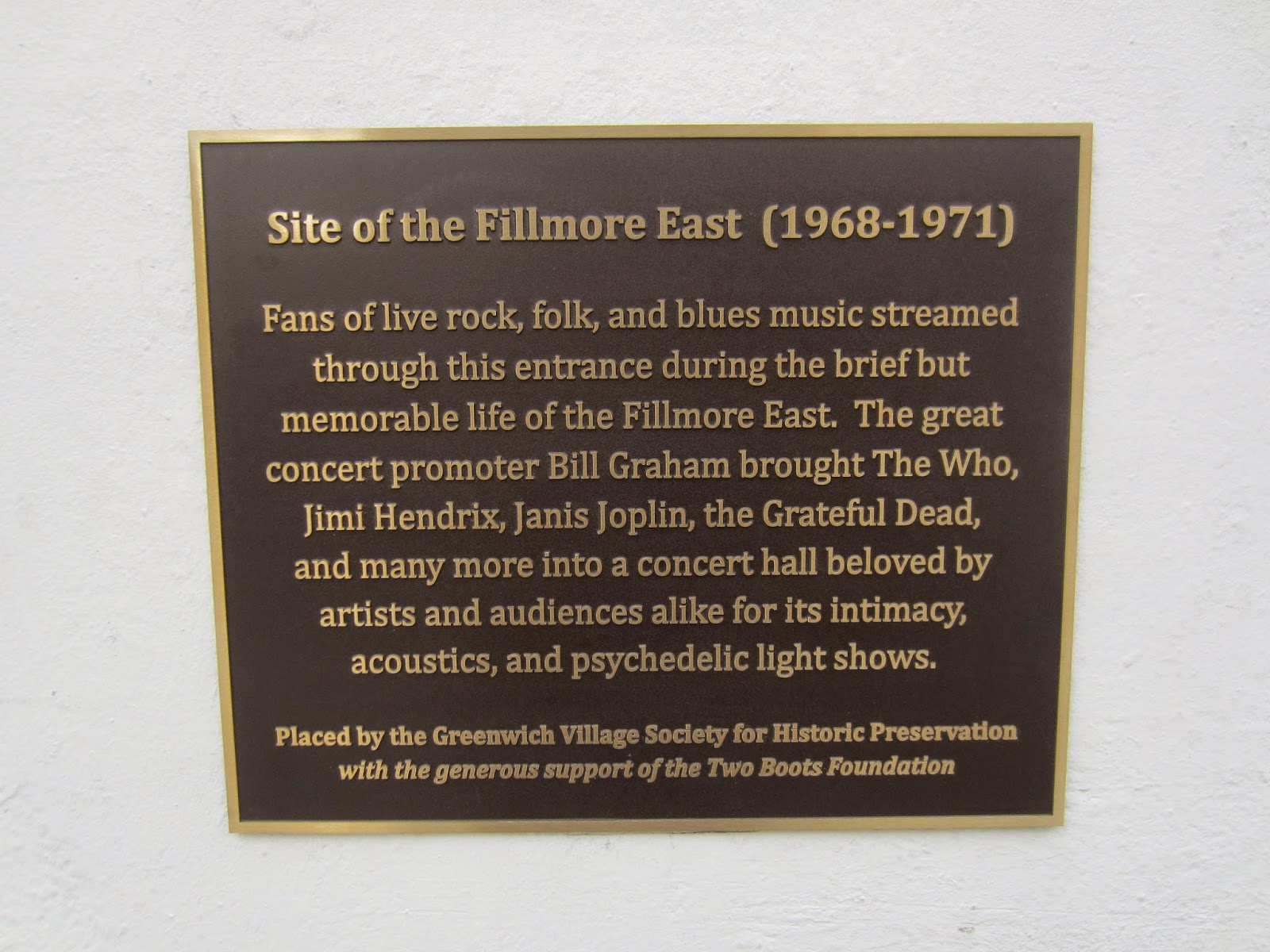
A plaque commemorating the venue, unveiled on October 29, 2015, by Greenwich Village Society for Historic Preservation

On November 17, 1972, the Fillmore East reopened as Villageast with "Virgin: A New Rock Opera Concert by The Mission". After a short run the Rock Opera closed and on December 15, 1972, Jerry Fuchs presented the opening night of concerts with a performance featuring Bloodrock, Elephants Memory, and Trapeze. On December 16, 1972, the bill was Bloodrock, Foghat and The Fabulous Rhinestones. Fuchs went on to present several other concerts at Villageast, including the New York Dolls and Teenage Lust on December 23, Chuck Berry and Bo Diddley on December 27, Steve Miller Band and Seatrain on December 28, and Roy Buchanan and Crazy Horse on December 30 and 31, 1972.

The band KISS, in preparation for their first "official" show as a signed, professional act, rented the Fillmore East for rehearsals from December 24 to December 30, 1973. The band returned to perform a press event to promote themselves on January 8, 1974. According to then manager Bill Aucoin, they were just trying to gauge the press reaction to the new shock rock band.

On December 7, 1974, Barry Stuart (Stein), reopened the venue as the NFE Theatre ("NFE" stood for "New Fillmore East") with a concert presenting Bachman-Turner Overdrive. On December 31, 1974, the Ike & Tina Turner Revue headlined a bill that included Quicksilver Messenger Service and Hidden Strength. It operated through 1975, but was renamed the "Village East", supposedly due to objections from Bill Graham over the use of the Fillmore name.

From 1980 to 1988, the renovated venue was home to The Saint, an early gay superclub. As of 2013, the former lobby building is owned by Apple Bank, which has a branch at street level, and the rest of the interior of the auditorium has been demolished and replaced with an apartment complex, Hudson East, with its entrance at 225 East 6th Street. The building at 105 Second Avenue is now part of the East Village/Lower East Side Historic District, created in October 2012.

In October 2014, the Greenwich Village Society for Historic Preservation unveiled a historic plaque on the building at a ceremony featuring Joshua White of the Joshua Light Show and critic/guitarist Lenny Kaye.

Live Nation resurrected the Fillmore East name by rebranding the renovated Irving Plaza as "The Fillmore New York at Irving Plaza" on April 11, 2007, with English pop music singer and songwriter Lily Allen as the opening act. However, in May 2010 Live Nation conceded that the new name had not caught on and due to "unrelenting demand" the name "Irving Plaza" was restored beginning on June 23, 2010.
