= So Many Roads =

So Many Roads may refer to:

- So Many Roads (John P. Hammond album), a 1965 album by John P. Hammond
- So Many Roads, a 1976 album by Otis Rush
- So Many Roads (1965–1995), a compilation album by the Grateful Dead

- "So Many Roads" (song), a song by the Grateful Dead that first appeared on this album

- So Many Roads: Live in Europe, a live album by Neal Morse
- "So Many Roads", a song from the 2007 album What We Made by Example
- "So Many Roads", a song by John Mayall and Peter Green, included in Looking Back (John Mayall album)
- So Many Roads, a 1976 compilation album by John Mayall
- "So Many Roads", a song by Cuby + Blizzards on their 1967 album, Groeten Uit Grollo

== See also ==
- "So Many Roads, So Many Trains(ja)", a train song first recorded by Otis Rush in 1960 and later covered on the John P. Hammond album above.
