= The Grateful Dead Movie =

1977 rock concert documentary by Jerry Garcia, Leon Gast

- The Grateful Dead Movie DVD cover
- Directed by: Jerry Garcia; Leon Gast
- Produced by: Edward Washington; Ron Rakow
- Starring: Jerry Garcia; Bob Weir; Phil Lesh; Bill Kreutzmann; Donna Godchaux; Keith Godchaux; Mickey Hart
- Cinematography: Stephen Lighthill; David Myers; Robert Primes
- Edited by: Susan R. Crutcher; Lisa Fruchtman; Jerry Garcia; John Nutt
- Release date: June 1, 1977
- Running time: 132 minutes
- Country: United States
- Language: English
- Budget: $600,000

The Grateful Dead Movie, released in 1977 and directed by Jerry Garcia and Leon Gast, is a film that captures live performances from rock band the Grateful Dead during an October 1974 five-night run at Winterland in San Francisco. These concerts marked the beginning of a hiatus, with the October 20, 1974, show billed as "The Last One". The band would return to touring in 1976. The film features the "Wall of Sound" concert sound system that the Dead used for all of 1974. The movie also portrays the burgeoning Deadhead scene. Two albums have been released in conjunction with the film and the concert run: Steal Your Face and The Grateful Dead Movie Soundtrack.

== Documenting the Grateful Dead experience ==
"There is nothing like a Grateful Dead concert" was a fan epithet, coined by Dead family member and building manager Willy Legate. In performance, the Dead emphasized musical improvisation and jamming, varying their set lists nightly. To Deadheads, their music was best appreciated in person, at live concerts. Furthermore, Dead shows were known for their positive, exuberant and celebratory atmosphere as the band and the audience interacted, fostering a special environment of musical celebration. Capturing this phenomenon on film was the paradoxical goal of The Grateful Dead Movie.

To document the Grateful Dead experience, the film showcases the fans more than was usual in a concert movie at the time. They are shown enjoying the show, discussing the music and the band, and what it was like to be a Deadhead in the mid-1970s. The film also includes interviews with members of the Dead and vintage footage from their colorful history and early days in the band. The film opens with a uniquely Grateful Dead animated sequence, featuring the "Uncle Sam skeleton". The psychedelic animation was created by Gary Gutierrez, using techniques that he developed specifically for the project. Stanley Mouse did the title art.

== The concerts ==
By 1974, lead guitarist Jerry Garcia wanted to stop touring and take a break from performing with the Grateful Dead. Before beginning a hiatus of uncertain length, a five-show farewell run was set for October 16–20, 1974 at Winterland in San Francisco. An idea developed to film the shows and then send the movie out on tour as a substitute. (The Band would film their farewell concert at the same venue two years later.) Manager Ron Rakow also sold the idea for a soundtrack album to United Artists Records.

At the beginning of the second set of the final show on October 20, 1974, Mickey Hart joined the band on stage as a second drummer. Hart had been a member of the Dead from September 1967 to February 1971. This appearance would lead to his permanent return to the band in 1976. At various times during these shows, the band was joined by frequent guest keyboardist Ned Lagin. In contrast to Keith Godchaux (a traditionalist who favored acoustic grand pianos and the Fender Rhodes), Lagin's array of instruments included a Rhodes, the ARP Odyssey and an Interdata 716-controlled E-mu Systems modular polyphonic synthesizer; technology in the latter instrument would eventually be licensed and appropriated for the Oberheim polyphonic synthesizer (1975) and the ubiquitous Sequential Circuits Prophet-5 (1978). Due to myriad recording and mixing problems that plagued the engagement, many of his parts were not recorded; this was exacerbated by his preference for playing through the powerful vocal system (considered to be "the best part of the entire Wall of Sound PA"), often resulting in the group's sound crew neglecting to switch between his quadrophonic input and the vocal input during long sequences. Additionally, as many as two channels of his input would still be lost in the mix when the system was working properly. In the film, Lagin is only briefly seen in silhouette during "Morning Dew" and "Johnny B. Goode", fulfilling a request he made to Jerry Garcia after estranging himself from the Grateful Dead in 1975.

With filmmaker Leon Gast directing, the concert footage was shot on six film cameras and the audio recorded on two 16-track machines. Gast remembered "They were at a point where they were ready to break up. What Jerry and Ron Rakow wanted to do was shoot a full Grateful Dead performance, from beginning to end. It was going to be five nights at the Winterland and they said, 'Sometimes it happens and sometimes it doesn’t. There will be one night when it will be magic.' I liked the Dead, but I wasn’t a Deadhead. I wasn’t sure I even knew what they were talking about ... and it did happen on the third night or the fourth night. ... At one point we were going to call it The Grateful Dead: Warts and All, but that’s not what happened. It became a movie about a series of concerts and the crew and the Deadheads. We agreed that this should be about the Grateful Dead experience."

== Production ==
When it became apparent that Garcia wanted to oversee all aspects of post-production, Gast excused himself from the project. Though unfamiliar with the band, Susan Crutcher was hired as an additional film editor (with Emily Craig as an assistant). Crutcher said "When I came on they had about 100,000 feet of film to sync up. That alone took five months. What [Gast] did was introduce the television concept of [multiple cameras for complete coverage], which was quite new then. He was hip enough to know about SMPTE timecode, which was a video thing. So we were one of the first movies that ever tried to interface SMPTE timecode and film. It really was kind of the crest of the wave."

Garcia worked on the editing, assembly and synchronization for nearly three years. Those that knew the guitarist at the time say he was consumed by the completion of the project and highly stressed. Garcia called the process "two years of incredible doubt, crisis after crisis." Bassist Phil Lesh explained "I don’t think Jer had any idea at the beginning how much mind-numbing repetitive detail he would have to wade through just to storyboard the film’s structure; the editing ended up taking more than two years, in the process scarfing down hundreds of thousands of dollars we didn’t have."

The opening animation sequence cost approximately as much as the rest of the movie, which together brought the Grateful Dead organization to the brink of bankruptcy, threatening the band's own record label and requiring the accumulation of more debt. To cover costs the band took out loans, signed a distribution deal with United Artist Records and self-released a string of albums: Robert Hunter's Tiger Rose; Garcia's Reflections; the Godchauxs' Keith & Donna; Lesh & Lagin's Seastones; Old & In the Way (David Grisman and Peter Rowan's bluegrass band with Garcia); and the Dead's Blues for Allah and Steal Your Face.

Rather than make dozens of prints of the film and distribute it through normal outlets, the movie was toured city-to-city, to control quality. According to Lesh, "Wishing to present the movie as a concert experience, Jerry enlisted one of our concert promoters to rent theaters (a process called “four-walling”) and bring in special sound systems to enhance the sound quality. (This was before the era of universal multitrack movie sound)."

Every college dorm in America had at least one kid on every hall with a VHS copy on his shelf. – Bill Kreutzmann

The movie was premiered June 1, 1977, at the Ziegfeld Theatre in New York City. After an initial multi-city tour, prints were made and the film occasionally appeared in theaters as a midnight movie. Because the Grateful Dead had returned to touring by the time the film was released, its original purpose had been lost. Not all band members were fond of the film as the cost and debt were a sticking point, and it didn't represent their current incarnation; by 1977, the Dead had stopped performing with Ned Lagin, regained their second drummer, built a scaled-down sound system, and were performing two new albums' worth of songs.

Drummer Bill Kreutzmann had a more positive reaction, saying "Producing that thing really consumed Jerry's time, on a day-to-day basis, throughout the hiatus. ... What are you going to do in that situation? Say, 'Okay, you can only have this much money and if the thing's not complete, who cares, wrap it up?' Or are you going to find more money for it and let it become a really worthy project that your band leader and good friend really believes in?... as Jerry had known all along, it captured and defined our identity, since it had the visual element to go along with the music, the animation to go along with the interviews, and the B-roll that really showed viewers with their own eyes the circus that was a Grateful Dead show in San Francisco circa 1974. ... the part of the movie that ate up the biggest slice of the budget and took the most work – the animated sequence in the beginning – is my favorite part. Back then, animation was all done by hand, frame by frame.

== Home video releases ==
The Grateful Dead Movie was released on VHS and CED videodisc in 1981. This edition was made from a cropped scan of the film to fit a 1.33:1 aspect ratio, and the monophonic sound and visual quality were not of high standard.

In 1991, it was released on LaserDisc.

It was released in the UK as a double video CD, in 1995.

A two-disc DVD of The Grateful Dead Movie was released on November 9, 2004. The movie was carefully restored from the film negative and the original aspect ratio of 1.85:1 preserved. It features three audio options: the original multi-channel theatrical mix, a new 5.1 multi-channel mix, or a new stereo mix. The first disc is the original film. The second disc contains bonus tracks from the concerts and several featurettes about the making of both the movie and the DVD, including then-recent interviews with Grateful Dead members. The DVD was certified Double Platinum (200,000 units) on February 21, 2005, in the Video Longform category.

On November 1, 2011, the restored movie was released on Blu-ray, with lossless audio. Extras include a commentary on the Blu-ray disc production, plus a DVD with 95 minutes of extra songs and featurettes on the making of the movie.

The Grateful Dead Movie is part of the All the Years Combine video box set, released April 17, 2012.

== Audio releases ==
While Garcia worked on the movie project, Phil Lesh and band sound man Owsley Stanley listened through the audio tapes to produce a soundtrack album. However, as both the movie project and the band's record label needed funding, the album release was pushed forward and Steal Your Face was released in conjunction with the band's return to touring, rather than as a movie tie-in or true soundtrack. Though compiled from the same run of concerts as the film, it shares only two songs ("Casey Jones" & U.S. Blues"). An additional track from the album ("Sugaree") later appeared as a bonus on the DVD version of the movie.

Following the release of the movie on DVD, The Grateful Dead Movie Soundtrack was compiled. The 5-CD box set mostly presents complete versions of songs that also appear in the film, plus 22 bonus tracks from the concerts. (See also From the Mars Hotel and Beyond Description for additional tracks from the dates.)

== Return to theaters ==
The restored version of The Grateful Dead Movie was screened as a one-night-only event, in approximately 540 theaters throughout the US on April 20, 2011. It was broadcast to the theaters via Dish Network for the first annual Grateful Dead Meet-Up at the Movies, and featured a pre-show with dozens of still photos of the band backed by audio of "Playing in the Band", as well as contemporary interviews with Garcia and rhythm guitarist Bob Weir. Due to popular demand, a second screening was held on May 5, 2011. The Grateful Dead Movie was screened on April 20, 2017, for the annual meetup at the movies It returned to the annual meetup at the movies in 2025, in a remastered IMAX format.

== Cast ==
The band

- Jerry Garcia – lead guitar, vocals
- Bob Weir – rhythm guitar, vocals
- Phil Lesh – bass, vocals
- Bill Kreutzmann – drums
- Keith Godchaux – acoustic piano and electric piano
- Donna Godchaux – vocals

Additional musicians

- Ned Lagin – electric piano and synthesizers
- Mickey Hart – drums

== Concert song list ==
The Grateful Dead Movie contains full or partial performances of the following songs:

- "U.S. Blues" October 18 & 19, 1974 (Note: Close-ups and audio from October 18; wide shots from October 19)
- "One More Saturday Night" October 19, 1974
- "Going Down the Road Feeling Bad" October 18, 1974
- "Truckin'" October 19, 1974
- "Eyes of the World" October 19, 1974
- "Sugar Magnolia" October 17 & 19, 1974 (Note: Most of the song is from October 17 but the "Sunshine Daydream" coda is from October 19)
- "Playing in the Band" October 16, 1974
- "Stella Blue" October 17, 1974
- "Casey Jones" October 17, 1974
- "He's Gone jam" October 17, 1974
- "Morning Dew" October 18, 1974
- "Johnny B. Goode" October 20, 1974

The DVD bonus disc includes the following full performances:

- "Uncle John's Band" October 19, 1974
- "Sugaree" October 18, 1974
- "The Other One"> October 17, 1974
- "Spanish Jam"> October 17, 1974
- "Mind Left Body Jam"> October 17, 1974
- "The Other One" October 17, 1974
- "Scarlet Begonias" October 19, 1974
- "China Cat Sunflower"> October 17, 1974
- "I Know You Rider" October 17, 1974
- "Dark Star" October 18, 1974
- "Weather Report Suite" October 18, 1974

Song notes

== General and cited references ==
- McNally, Dennis (2002). A Long Strange Trip: The Inside History of the Grateful Dead. Broadway Books. ISBN 9780767911856.
- Jackson, Blair (1999). Garcia: An American Life. Penguin Books; New York, NY. ISBN 978-0140291995.
- Lesh, Phil (2005). Searching for the Sound. Little, Brown & Co.; New York, NY. ISBN 978-0-316-00998-0.
- Kreutzmann, Bill (2015). Deal. St. Martin's Press, New York, NY. ISBN 978-1-250-03380-2.
- Planer, Lindsay (December 7, 2004). "Since It Costs A Lot To Win: The Saga of The Grateful Dead Movie". Crutchfield Advisor. Archived from the original on January 21, 2005.
- Metzger, John (December 2004). "From Chaos to Beauty: The Transformation of The Grateful Dead Movie". The Music Box. Vol. 11, no. 12.
- The Grateful Dead Movie at IMDb
- The Grateful Dead Movie at AllMusic
- The Grateful Dead Movie DVD review at The Best of Website
