= The Grateful Dead Movie Soundtrack =

Live album by the Grateful Dead
- Released: March 15, 2005
- Recorded: October 16–20, 1974
- Venue: Winterland Arena
- Genre: Jam rock, psychedelic rock, folk rock
- Length: 387:54
- Label: Grateful Dead Records
- Producer: David Lemieux, Jeffrey Norman

Grateful Dead chronology
Dick's Picks Volume 34 (2005)	The Grateful Dead Movie Soundtrack (2005)	Rare Cuts and Oddities 1966 (2005)

The Grateful Dead Movie Soundtrack is a five-CD live album by the rock band the Grateful Dead. It was recorded on October 16–20, 1974 at the Winterland Ballroom in San Francisco. It includes all of the music from The Grateful Dead Movie, a theatrical film released in 1977, along with many additional songs. The album was remixed from the original 16-track concert soundboard tapes. It was released on March 15, 2005.

The Grateful Dead Movie Soundtrack was released as a 10-disc vinyl LP, in a limited edition of 3,000 copies, on May 22, 2026.

== Recording and production ==
In 1974 the Grateful Dead were exhausted from touring, and it had proven too expensive and cumbersome to tour with the "Wall of Sound" sound system. In response, the group decided to stop touring for an indefinite period of time. In October they played five nights at the Winterland Ballroom in San Francisco, California. As they were the last concerts before the hiatus, the Grateful Dead wanted them to be properly recorded and documented by a film crew.

The results were a rather unsuccessful live album, Steal Your Face, and a film, The Grateful Dead Movie. The movie was released in theaters in 1977, and on videotape in 1981. In 2004 it was expanded to a double DVD with bonus cuts and documentaries. A few months later, a five CD album was released as The Grateful Dead Movie Soundtrack. The album included even more previously unreleased tracks, including a rare "Tomorrow Is Forever". The DVD contains one track not released on the soundtrack ("Sugaree" from October 18, which was previously released on Steal Your Face). Likewise, half of the selections are unique to this box set and not included in the DVD movie. Furthermore, despite being a rather comprehensive five-disc box set, it only captures about half of the nearly 60 different songs played across this five-night stand.

== Critical reception ==
Professional ratings
Review scores
Source	Rating
AllMusic	4.5/5 stars
The Music Box	5/5 stars

On AllMusic, Lindsay Planer said, "Even given the extended CD format, nary a moment is wasted.... Plus, there is tons of music that still wouldn't fit on the DVDs. In particular, the reunion with Mickey Hart (drums) on 10/20 as he returned to the fold after an absence of three years and eight months."

In The Music Box, John Metzger wrote, "Featuring six hours worth of material, The Grateful Dead Movie Soundtrack might appear, at first glimpse, to be a tad unwieldy for some casual fans to undertake, but the Grateful Dead's variegated, multi-textural approach allowed it to cover vast expanses of terrain with magnificently stunning ease."

== Track listing ==
Disc one

1. "U.S. Blues" (Robert Hunter, Jerry Garcia) – 5:13
2. "One More Saturday Night" (Bob Weir) – 6:33
3. "China Cat Sunflower" > (Hunter, Garcia) – 9:14
4. "I Know You Rider" (traditional, arr. Grateful Dead) – 6:07
5. "Eyes of the World" > (Hunter, Garcia) – 13:01
6. "China Doll" (Hunter, Garcia) – 6:16
7. "Playing in the Band" (Hunter, Mickey Hart, Weir) – 31:44

Notes:

- "U.S. Blues" is an edited version with the fourth verse excised
- "Eyes of the World" is an edited version previously released in full on So Many Roads (1965–1995)

Disc two

1. "Scarlet Begonias" (Hunter, Garcia) – 13:56
2. "He's Gone" > (Hunter, Garcia) – 13:01
3. "Jam" > (Grateful Dead) – 7:31
4. "Weirdness" > (Grateful Dead) – 8:05
5. "The Other One" > (Bill Kreutzmann, Weir) – 7:34
6. "Spanish Jam" > (Grateful Dead) – 1:48
7. "Mind Left Body Jam" > (Grateful Dead) – 3:10
8. "The Other One" > (Kreutzmann, Weir) – 2:28
9. "Stella Blue" (Hunter, Garcia) – 9:04
10. "Casey Jones" (Hunter, Garcia) – 5:23

Notes:

"Casey Jones" is an edited version previously released in full on Steal Your Face

Disc three

1. "Weather Report Suite" – 16:44

"Prelude" (Weir)
"Part I" (Eric Andersen, Weir)
"Part II: Let It Grow" (John Barlow, Weir)

2. "Jam" > (Grateful Dead) – 8:54
3. "Dark Star" > (Hunter, Garcia, Hart, Kreutzmann, Phil Lesh, Pigpen, Weir) – 24:10
4. "Morning Dew" (Bonnie Dobson, Tim Rose) – 13:54
5. "Not Fade Away" > (Buddy Holly, Norman Petty) – 8:34
6. "Goin' Down The Road Feeling Bad" (trad., arr. Grateful Dead) – 7:33

Notes:

"Goin' Down the Road Feeling Bad" is an edited version with the first solo removed and soundcheck dialogue added from the film

Disc four

1. "Uncle John's Band" (Hunter, Garcia) – 9:08
2. "Big Railroad Blues" (Noah Lewis) – 5:02
3. "Tomorrow Is Forever" (Dolly Parton, Porter Wagoner) – 6:26
4. "Sugar Magnolia" (Hunter, Weir) – 5:26
5. "He's Gone" > (Hunter, Garcia) – 13:49
6. "Caution Jam" > (Grateful Dead) – 4:30
7. "Drums" > (Kreutzmann) – 1:23
8. "Space" > (Grateful Dead) – 9:14
9. "Truckin' " > (Hunter, Garcia, Lesh, Weir) – 9:48
10. "Black Peter" > (Hunter, Garcia) – 10:10
11. "Sunshine Daydream" (Hunter, Weir) – 3:14

Notes:

"Sugar Magnolia" is an edited version, without its "Sunshine Daydream" coda (though the coda from another date appears as the last track of the disc)

Disc five

1. "Playing in the Band" > (Hunter, Hart, Weir) – 13:24
2. "Drums" > (Hart, Kreutzmann) – 4:09
3. "Not Fade Away" > (Holly, Petty) – 14:44
4. "Drums" > (Hart, Kreutzmann) – 4:53
5. "The Other One" > (Kreutzmann, Weir) – 10:56
6. "Wharf Rat" > (Hunter, Garcia) – 9:35
7. "Playing in the Band" (Hunter, Hart, Weir) – 8:38
8. "Johnny B. Goode" (Chuck Berry) – 3:55
9. "Mississippi Half-Step Uptown Toodeloo" > (Hunter, Garcia) – 7:34
10. "And We Bid You Goodnight" (trad., arr. Grateful Dead) – 1:59

Notes:

"Johnny B. Goode" is an edited version with part of the first solo, and all of the second, excised

== Recording dates ==
- October 16, 1974 – Disc 1 track 7 ("Scarlet Begonias" from this date was released as a bonus track on the reissue of From the Mars Hotel)
- October 17, 1974 – Disc 1 tracks 3–4, Disc 2 tracks 2–10, Disc 4 track 4 ("Weather Report Suite" from this date was released on the bonus disc for Beyond Description)
- October 18, 1974 – Disc 1 track 1, Disc 3
- October 19, 1974 – Disc 1 tracks 2 & 5–6, Disc 2 track 1, Disc 4 tracks 1–3 & 5–11
- October 20, 1974 – Disc 5

== Personnel ==
Grateful Dead

- Jerry Garcia – lead guitar, vocals
- Bob Weir – rhythm guitar, vocals
- Phil Lesh – bass guitar, vocals
- Donna Godchaux – vocals
- Keith Godchaux – keyboards, piano
- Bill Kreutzmann – drums
- Mickey Hart – drums (Disc 5)
- Ned Lagin – electric piano (Disc 3 tracks 2–4; Disc 5)

Production

- David Lemieux – producer
- Jeffrey Norman – producer
- Bill Wolf – audio engineer
- Jeffrey Norman – audio mixer
- Eileen Law – archival research
- Gary Gutierrez – cover art
- Bruce Polonsky – photography
- Dave Patrick – photography
- Robert Minkin – package design and production
