= Steal Your Face =

Live album by Grateful Dead
- Released: June 26, 1976
- Recorded: October 17–20, 1974
- Genres: Jam rock; roots rock
- Length: 84:13
- Label: Grateful Dead
- Producer: Grateful Dead

Grateful Dead chronology
Blues for Allah (1975)	Steal Your Face (1976)	Terrapin Station (1977)

Professional ratings
Review scores
Source	Rating
AllMusic	3/5 stars
Christgau's Record Guide	C−
Rolling Stone	2/5 stars

Steal Your Face is a live double album by the Grateful Dead, released in June 1976. It is the band's fifth live album and thirteenth overall, as well as the fourth and final album released by the band on their original Grateful Dead Records label.

The album was recorded October 17–20, 1974, at San Francisco's Winterland Ballroom, during a "farewell run" that preceded a hiatus from their nonstop touring schedule for the previous few years. The Grateful Dead Movie Soundtrack, a second album from the same run of shows, was released in 2005.

== Concerts and recording ==
After a grueling schedule, caused in part by the cost of the band's unwieldy "Wall of Sound" public address system, the decision was made to stop touring and performing as the Grateful Dead, but without formally dissolving.

Their massive and innovative sound reinforcement system for live gigs included over 600 speakers powered by a minimum of 48 600-watt amplifiers. The sound system also presented an array of physical, audio, and technical difficulties. It required four semi-trailer trucks to transport, and, due to the time required for rigging, necessitated two leapfrogging road crews with separate scaffolding sets.

As a business entity the Grateful Dead had several hundred employees including road crew, fan club, business accounting and songwriting publishing, and record label management.

Bassist Phil Lesh recalled the "stresses and strains associated with large-scale touring – together with the devastating loss of [lead singer/organist] Pigpen – were starting to create cracks and crevices in our unanimity of purpose. ... Too many gigs, too much money spent, and too many people trying to get backstage all added up to a potentially explosive broth. Something had to give – so before it did, we made a decision to take some time off." Drummer Bill Kreutzmann stated, "I didn't think the Wall of Sound sounded great, but our interplay at some of those shows was phenomenal. At some point, though, that’s not enough. By the end of 1974, Jerry was done being that kind of hero. He was ready for a change of scene. He needed a break from it. I honored his decision, and the rest of us did, too."

The hiatus from touring lasted slightly under two years, but the band's members remained active with solo projects and other small scale performance projects. They also began recording sessions for the album Blues for Allah a few months after the Winterland gigs.

== Production and mixing ==
In addition to recording the concerts on two 16-track machines, the shows were filmed for a movie release.

The completion of The Grateful Dead Movie would take nearly three years. In the meantime, band manager Ron Rakow agreed to the delivery of a soundtrack album to United Artists Records in return for additional organizational and film production costs. With lead guitarist Jerry Garcia focused on the film's sound synchronization and editing, Lesh and sound man Owsley Stanley were tasked with finishing the album tie-in first. Rather than a soundtrack for the yet-uncompleted film, the pair separately reviewed the audio from copies of Garcia's work tapes, then selected concert performances for a double-live album.

Because the sound system was stacked behind the band, restricted-frequency differential microphones were used in pairs, to prevent bleed and feedback loops. One was wired out-of-phase in a phase-cancellation scheme requiring the singers to position very close to the microphones. This, along with the lack of a sound/mixing board, created sonic anomalies during tape mixing. Additionally, the drum tracks suffered from distortion. Some vocals were lost – particularly those by backing vocalist Donna Godchaux – needing to be dubbed in the studio.

At the time of production, quadraphonic technology appeared ascendant. In anticipation, the album was mixed for the QS standard – one of several competing vinyl matrix formats. Rather than a dedicated stereo mix, during mastering, the quadraphonic mix was folded down to two channels. Lesh explained Bear and he decided to mix "the whole thing in 'quad' ... the result was a glutinous mud bath of sound, through which any music was scarcely discernible. Bear and I went to Rakow, telling him the recordings were unusable. He brushed our objections aside, saying, 'They’ll buy it anyway; we need this record.' It’s a wonder the record was finished; the fact it was released – against my better judgment – shows how desperate we were for product to take up the slack from lack of touring income". Ultimately, by the time the album was released, the Grateful Dead resumed touring. With the movie unfinished, the album was instead promoted in conjunction with the tour.

== Release and reception ==
Although the song does not appear on the album, the title is taken from the lyrics of "He's Gone":

Like I told you, what I said
Steal your face right off your head

The cover art prominently features the "Lightning Skull" logo. One of the band's iconic images, it was designed by Owsley Stanley to mark equipment cases, then rendered by Bob Thomas. The graphic previously appeared as part of the cover art of History of the Grateful Dead, Volume One (Bear's Choice). The inside of the gatefold features a panel of photos from the concert run at Winterland and one from earlier in the band's history.

Rather than include any of the Dead's trademark extended jams, shorter songs dominate the track list. Coupled with the unflattering sound and performances, the result was received poorly by both critics and fans. However, opinion improved over time, particularly following sonically improved reissues, with the album considered unique in the band's catalog, if not underrated. Along with choosing performances to fit more than one-to-a-side on a vinyl record, Lesh focused on songs not previously released or whose arrangements evolved. However, only two selections on the album were also used wholly or in part in the film ("Casey Jones" and "U.S. Blues". An additional track – "Sugaree" – also appears on the movie's bonus DVD). Most songs were left intact without editing. The exception is "Black-Throated Wind" with its early fade-out. Of the 14 songs, seven appeared on Grateful Dead albums in studio form. One was released on Weir's solo album, and two on Garcia solo albums. Four others are covers, including two by Chuck Berry.

Band chronicler Blair Jackson explained the reasons Lesh's method for song choice did not mesh with Deadhead expectation: "[It] had none of the natural flow of a Grateful Dead concert. It was as if someone threw all the songs into a hat, then pulled them out randomly, which is not the way the Grateful Dead operated at all. Their sets, while definitely eclectic, were built piece by piece according to what songs felt right to play at the moment. Garcia's choices affected Weir's choices, and vice versa. Steal Your Face consisted mainly of short songs usually played in the lighter first set, and it was devoid of any extended improvisation. Considering the material available from that five-night run, the song selection was mystifying to say the least." Garcia saw the album as a specific statement from the same era as the movie, noting "[Phil] picked out what he liked for his reasons. If anyone wants to have some concept of what Phil likes, that's a good album. ... We don't interfere with each other on that level."

Steal Your Face was the band's final album released on Grateful Dead Records, as well as their only double album and live album on the label. With GDR's collapse a few months after the album's release, Steal Your Face was mostly out of print for over a decade. United Artists Records pressed an edition in 1979, and the album was mastered for CD release in 1989, returning to publication. A remastered version was released by Rhino Records in 2004. The number of copies issued in QS-quadraphonic is unknown.

The album was not included in the Beyond Description (1973–1989) box set, which otherwise collected all of the albums released in that era. However, concurrent with the set, The Grateful Dead Movie was restored and released as a two-disc DVD. An additional five-CD box set, The Grateful Dead Movie Soundtrack, featured a much larger sample of the same concert run, sharing only one track with Steal Your Face ("Casey Jones", from October 17, in abbreviated form). Three songs appear on both albums, but are from different dates: "Stella Blue", "Mississippi Half-Step Uptown Toodeloo", and "U.S. Blues".

Steal Your Face was included in the five-LP box set Grateful Dead Records Collection. The box set was released for Record Store Day Black Friday on November 24, 2017. It contains the albums Wake of the Flood, From the Mars Hotel, Blues for Allah, and Steal Your Face, remastered and pressed on 180-gram vinyl. The liner notes give these credits: Mastering by David Glasser at Airshow Mastering, Boulder, CO; lacquers by Chris Bellman at Bernie Grundman Mastering, Hollywood, CA; and Plangent Processes wow and flutter removal by Jamie Howarth.

== Track listing ==
Side one
No.	Title	Writer(s)	Lead vocals	Length
1.	"Promised Land"	Chuck Berry	Weir	3:15
2.	"Cold Rain and Snow"	Traditional, arr. Grateful Dead	Garcia	5:35
3.	"Around and Around"	Berry	Weir	5:07
4.	"Stella Blue"	Jerry Garcia, Robert Hunter	Garcia	8:48

Side two
No.	Title	Writer(s)	Lead vocals	Length
1.	"Mississippi Half-Step Uptown Toodeloo"	Garcia, Hunter	Garcia	8:00
2.	"Ship of Fools"	Garcia, Hunter	Garcia	6:59
3.	"Beat It On Down the Line"	Jesse Fuller	Weir	3:22

Side three
No.	Title	Writer(s)	Lead vocals	Length
1.	"Big River"	Johnny Cash	Weir	4:53
2.	"Black-Throated Wind"	Bob Weir, John Barlow	Weir	6:05
3.	"U.S. Blues"	Garcia, Hunter	Garcia	5:18
4.	"El Paso"	Marty Robbins	Weir	4:15

Side four
No.	Title	Writer(s)	Lead vocals	Length
1.	"Sugaree"	Garcia, Hunter	Garcia	7:33
2.	"It Must Have Been the Roses"	Hunter	Garcia	5:58
3.	"Casey Jones"	Garcia, Hunter	Garcia	7:02

- "Black-Throated Wind" is an excerpt of the performance

== Recording dates ==
All tracks recorded live at Winterland, San Francisco

- "Casey Jones" and "It Must Have Been the Roses" – October 17, 1974 (see Beyond Description & Movie Soundtrack for more from this date)
- "Ship of Fools", "Beat It On Down the Line" and "Sugaree" – October 18, 1974 (see Movie Soundtrack for more from this date)
- "Mississippi Half-Step Uptown Toodeloo", "Black Throated Wind", "U.S. Blues", "Big River" and "El Paso" – October 19, 1974 (see So Many Roads & Movie Soundtrack for more from this date)
- "Promised Land", "Cold Rain and Snow", "Around and Around", and "Stella Blue" – October 20, 1974 (see Movie Soundtrack for more from this date)

== Personnel ==
Grateful Dead

- Jerry Garcia – guitar, vocals
- Donna Jean Godchaux – vocals
- Keith Godchaux – keyboards, vocals
- Bill Kreutzmann – drums
- Phil Lesh – bass guitar
- Bob Weir – guitar, vocals

With

- Mickey Hart – drums on "The Promised Land"
- Ned Lagin – electric piano on "Stella Blue"
