= Dick's Picks Volume 24 =

Live album by Grateful Dead
- Released: February 11, 2002
- Recorded: March 23, 1974
- Venue: Cow Palace
- Genre: Rock
- Length: 151:17
- Label: Grateful Dead Productions

Grateful Dead chronology
The Golden Road (1965–1973) (2001)	Dick's Picks Volume 24 (2002)	Postcards of the Hanging (2002)

Professional ratings
Review scores
Source	Rating
Allmusic	4/5 stars
Jambands.com	(favorable)
The Music Box	5/5 stars
Rolling Stone	3/5 stars

Dick's Picks Volume 24 is a two-CD live album by the rock band the Grateful Dead. It contains selections from the March 23, 1974 concert at the Cow Palace in Daly City, California. Mastered in HDCD, it was released on February 11, 2002.

This was a significant show in Dead history, being the first to use an essentially complete version of the Wall of Sound setup. A short-lived sound system, it was diminished after less than two years due to high maintenance, transportation and assembly costs. They began work on it in 1973 and smaller versions of the system were used right up until this show. Also featured are the first performances of "Scarlet Begonias" and "Cassidy".

== Enclosure, liner notes, and article ==
The release includes two sheets of paper stapled together in the middle, yielding an eight-page enclosure that slides out of the case, enabling its front page to also function as the CD's cover. The back features a small white outline of a stealie skull superimposed on the bottom of a photograph of a city skyline in the twilight.

The inside is an homage to the Grateful Dead's Wall of sound sound system. The first two pages contain liner notes by Owsley "Bear" Stanley next to a large black-and-white photograph of the system. The two pages in the middle contain a collage consisting of some newspaper clippings backed by another black-and-white image of the system. The penultimate page lists the contents of and credits for the release, and the last page features a large photo of the band playing in front of their Wall of sound.

=== Liner notes by Bear ===
Owsley "Bear" Stanley wrote the liner notes on 12/15/2001. Consisting of just six paragraphs, they give an overview of why he, the band, and several others created the Wall of sound, along with how they designed it.

In the first paragraph the author asserts that "I told them before we began I was sure it could be done, the technology was available, but I was also sure they would not like it once they were locked into using it." He goes on to state that the system was "a radiating wall" and "The entire surface was working, the lines [sequences of speakers] and clusters [of tweeters for the vocals and keyboards] combining to produce a kind of sound no modern system can duplicate."

Bear acknowledges he got help from "Ron Wickersham, John Curl, John Meyer, who was with McCune sound at the time, and Bob Matthews, Dan Healy and virtually everyone in the crew had some part in constructing this monster." He ends his essay by stating they "had three complete staging rigs and crews, one was being torn down, one was being erected and one was in use at any given time during the tour."

=== Article by John L. Wasserman ===
The largest newspaper clipping in the middle two pages of the enclosure is an "On the town" article entitled "The Dead: committed to sound perfection." It was written by John L. Wasserman and published in the San Francisco Chronicle on Friday, March 22, 1974.

The author claims the system "cost something on the order of $200,000" and "is probably the finest portable sound system ever devised." Quoting "Ron Wickersham, Alembic [sound company]'s chief engineer," John writes that one of the "goals for the vocal system was to make it possible for people at the back of the hall to hear clearly even if the people on stage are speaking at a normal level."

Wasserman goes on to state that because "each member of the band has total control over his or her volume," they "are able to mix their own sound balance as they are playing." He closes his article by quoting Phil Lesh as saying, "we run everything from the stage" and "For me, it's like piloting a flying saucr [sic]. Or riding your own sound wave."

== Caveat emptor ==
Each volume of Dick's Picks has its own "caveat emptor" label, advising the listener of the sound quality of the recording. The label for volume 24 reads:

"Dick's Picks Vol. 24 was mastered from the original 2 track analog source tapes recorded at 7.5 ips. Some minor sonic anomalies remain, but as much as is humanly and mechanically possible has been done to make this recording as good as it can be. Enjoy."

== Track listing ==
=== Disc one ===
1. "U.S. Blues" (Robert Hunter, Jerry Garcia) – 6:16
2. "Promised Land" (Chuck Berry) – 4:04
3. "Brown-Eyed Women" (Hunter, Garcia) – 5:27
4. "Black-Throated Wind" (John Barlow, Bob Weir) – 7:04
5. "Scarlet Begonias" (Hunter, Garcia) – 7:14
6. "Beat It On Down the Line" (Jesse Fuller) – 3:46
7. "Deal" (Hunter, Garcia) – 5:29
8. "Cassidy" (Barlow, Weir) – 4:09
9. "China Cat Sunflower" > (Hunter, Garcia) – 8:41
10. "I Know You Rider" (trad., arr. Grateful Dead) – 6:02
11. "Weather Report Suite" (Eric Andersen, Barlow, Weir) – 15:34

=== Disc two ===
1. "Playing in the Band" > (Hunter, Mickey Hart, Weir) – 14:11
2. "Uncle John's Band" > (Hunter, Garcia) – 9:16
3. "Morning Dew" > (Bonnie Dobson, Tim Rose) – 12:31
4. "Uncle John's Band" > (Hunter, Garcia) – 6:27
5. "Playing in the Band" (Hunter, Hart, Weir) – 4:11
6. "Big River" (Johnny Cash) – 5:54
7. "Bertha" (Hunter, Garcia) – 6:35
8. "Wharf Rat" > (Hunter, Garcia) – 9:29
9. "Sugar Magnolia" (Hunter, Weir) – 8:57 (Note: Edited version of performance)

== Personnel ==
Grateful Dead

- Jerry Garcia – lead guitar, vocals
- Bob Weir – rhythm guitar, vocals
- Phil Lesh – bass guitar, vocals
- Donna Godchaux – vocals
- Keith Godchaux – keyboards
- Bill Kreutzmann – drums
