= Cat Dreams (album) =

- Cover of the 2017 CD

Studio album by Ned Lagin
- Released: 2017
- Recorded: 2016
- Genres: Ambient, Country, Electronic, Jazz-rock, Orchestral jazz
- Length: 77:50
- Label: Ned Lagin
- Producer: Ned Lagin

Cat Dreams is an album by American composer and musician Ned Lagin.

Cat Dreams was completed in 2016. It is Ned Lagin's first music CD, and first public music, since 1975.

The album Cat Dreams is a suite of composed pieces, and melodic, tonal, and rhythmic frameworks for improvisation. The album was recorded on a laptop computer, mostly in Lagin's living room, and with some sessions taking place in practice rooms. All of the recordings are first takes, in effect making for a "live" album.

The album contains 17 tracks; all are composed by Ned Lagin.

Cat Dreams is the first of the planned two CDs release that comprise the full suite of compositions.

== Track listing ==
No.	Title	Length
1.	"Listen To The Rain (Prologue)"	2:22
2.	"Heartbeats (Tyler's Adventure)"	6:10
3.	"The Creek"	6:10
4.	"Sun Cats"	4:04
5.	"Cat Samba"	8:51
6.	"Catnip"	2:27
7.	"Cat Licks"	4:56
8.	"Starlight"	0:59
9.	"Nimo's Song"	11:54
10.	"Moonrise"	0:50
11.	"Night Sounds"	1:22
12.	"Night Journey"	1:03
13.	"Night Spirits"	2:51
14.	"Somebody's Baby"	3:24
15.	"Teddy Sings A Love Song (How His Heart Sings)"	8:57
16.	"G's Star"	6:53
17.	"Listen To The Rain (Epilogue)"	2:48
Total length:		77:50

Notes:

- Tracks 5, 6, and 7 form the "Big Cat Dance" suite.

== Personnel ==
- Ned Lagin - electric piano, keyboard synths (including vocals, cello, acoustic guitar, electric guitar, pedal steel guitar, banjo, and others), Native American flutes, and softsynths (Ableton Live and Max for Live, Reason, Reaktor).
- Celso Alberti – drums, percussion (tracks: 2, 5, 9)
- Dick Bright – violin (tracks: 7)
- Barry Finnerty – electric guitar (tracks: 2, 5, 7, 9, 14, 15, 16)
- Kevin Hayes – drums (tracks: 2, 6, 7)
- Alex Maldonado – Native American flute (tracks: 11, 12, 13)
- Dewayne Pate – electric bass (tracks: 2, 5, 6, 7, 9)
- Barry Sless – pedal steel guitar (tracks: 7)
- Gary Vogensen – electric guitar (tracks: 7)

== Reception ==
In the Relix review of the album, Jesse Jarnow said: "Whether one has been waiting 40 years for Ned Lagin to follow up his 1975 debut or not, his long-time-coming "Cat Dreams" is bound to surprise."
