= Dave's Picks Volume 34 =

Live album by Grateful Dead
- Released: May 1, 2020
- Recorded: June 23, 1974
- Venue: Jai-Alai Fronton; Miami, Florida
- Genre: Rock
- Length: 180:09 (Bonus disc 78:42)
- Label: Rhino
- Producer: Grateful Dead

Grateful Dead chronology
June 1976 (2020)	Dave's Picks Volume 34 (2020)	Workingman's Dead: The Angel's Share (2020)

Alternative cover
- Dave's Picks 2020 Bonus Disc

Dave's Picks Volume 34 is a three-CD live album by the rock band the Grateful Dead. It contains the complete concert recorded on June 23, 1974, at the Jai-Alai Fronton in Miami, Florida. It also includes a fourth, bonus disc recorded at the same venue the previous night. It was released on May 1, 2020, in a limited edition of 22,000 copies.

The album features the first live performance of "Seastones", an experimental electronic music composition by Ned Lagin and Phil Lesh. It also includes the Dead's only performance of the Chuck Berry song "Let It Rock". Lagin also played for most of the second set; he did not perform on "Big River," "Uncle John's Band," "One More Saturday Night," or "Casey Jones."

The album was originally suggested by former archivist Dick Latvala for inclusion in the "Dicks Picks" series.

== Critical reception ==
On AllMusic, Timothy Monger wrote, "Although beset with technical issues and difficult to tour with, their gargantuan sound system on this tour [the Wall of Sound] brought a clarity that was unparalleled at the time. Captured from Kidd Candelario's tapes, this complete concert set from June 23, 1974 features highlights of the era..."

== Track listing ==
Disc 1

First set:

1. "Ramble On Rose" (Jerry Garcia, Robert Hunter) – 7:30
2. "Black-Throated Wind" (Bob Weir, John Perry Barlow) – 9:20
3. "Mississippi Half-Step Uptown Toodeloo" (Garcia, Hunter) – 7:49
4. "Beat It On Down the Line" (Jesse Fuller) – 3:45
5. "Row Jimmy" (Garcia, Hunter) – 8:03
6. "Jack Straw" (Weir, Hunter) – 5:53
7. "Let It Rock" (Chuck Berry) – 3:39
8. "Cumberland Blues" (Garcia, Phil Lesh, Hunter) – 6:49
9. "El Paso" (Marty Robbins) – 4:40
10. "To Lay Me Down" (Garcia, Hunter) – 8:02

Disc 2

1. "Weather Report Suite" (16:31)
  - "Prelude" (Weir)
  - "Part I" (Weir, Eric Andersen)
  - "Part II (Let It Grow)" (Weir, Barlow)
2. "China Doll" (Garcia, Hunter) – 5:43

Second set:

3. "Seastones" (Ned Lagin, Lesh) – 9:45
4. "Jam" (Grateful Dead) – 4:04
5. "Ship of Fools" (Garcia, Hunter) – 6:14
6. "Big River" (Johnny Cash) – 5:19
7. "Black Peter" (Garcia, Hunter) – 9:22

Disc 3

1. "Around and Around" (Berry) – 6:06
2. "Dark Star Jam" (Garcia, Mickey Hart, Bill Kreutzmann, Lesh, Ron "Pigpen" McKernan, Weir, Hunter) – 17:37^{[B]}
3. "Spanish Jam" (Grateful Dead) – 4:22^{[B]}
4. "U.S. Blues" (Garcia, Hunter) – 8:50^{[B]}
5. "Uncle John's Band" (Garcia, Hunter) – 7:53
6. "One More Saturday Night" (Weir) – 6:00

Encore:

7. "Casey Jones" (Garcia, Hunter) – 6:48

Dave's Picks 2020 Bonus Disc

Jai-Alai Fronton, June 22, 1974 – selections:

1. "Playing in the Band" (Weir, Hart, Hunter) – 28:56
2. "China Cat Sunflower" (Garcia, Hunter) – 9:54
3. "I Know You Rider" (traditional, arranged by Grateful Dead) – 5:41
4. "Eyes of the World" (Garcia, Hunter) – 15:11
5. "Wharf Rat" (Garcia, Hunter) – 10:10
6. "Sugar Magnolia" (Weir, Hunter) – 8:48

Notes

- "Tico-Tico" tuning before "Mississippi Half-Step Uptown Toodeloo"
- The set list for the June 22, 1974 concert at the Jai-Alai Fronton was:

First set: "Promised Land" · "Bertha" · "Greatest Story Ever Told" · "Deal" · "Me and Bobby McGee" · "Scarlet Begonias" · "Jack Straw" · "Loose Lucy" · "Mexicali Blues" · "Sugaree" · "The Race Is On" · "It Must Have Been the Roses" · "Playing in the Band"^{[A]}

Second set: "China Cat Sunflower"^{[A]} · "I Know You Rider"^{[A]} · "Me and My Uncle" · "Ship of Fools" · "El Paso" · "Eyes of the World"^{[A]} · "Wharf Rat"^{[A]} · "Sugar Magnolia"^{[A]}

Encore: "Johnny B. Goode"

[A] Included in Dave's Picks 2020 Bonus Disc

[B] Also on the 1999 album So Many Roads (1965–1995)

== Personnel ==
Grateful Dead

- Jerry Garcia – guitar, vocals
- Donna Jean Godchaux – vocals
- Keith Godchaux – keyboards
- Bill Kreutzmann – drums
- Phil Lesh – bass, vocals
- Bob Weir – guitar, vocals

Additional musicians

- Ned Lagin – keyboards on "Seastones" and during the second set

Production

- Produced by Grateful Dead
- Produced for release by David Lemieux
- Associate Producers: Ivette Ramos & Doran Tyson
- Mastering: Jeffrey Norman
- Recording: Kidd Candelario
- Art direction, design: Steve Vance
- Cover art: Dave Kloc
- Photos: Forensicdoceleven
- Liner notes essay: David Lemieux

== Charts ==
Chart performance for Dave's Picks Volume 34
Chart (2020)	Peak position
US Billboard 200	22
US Top Rock Albums (Billboard)	1
