= Bob Bralove =

American music technician and keyboardist

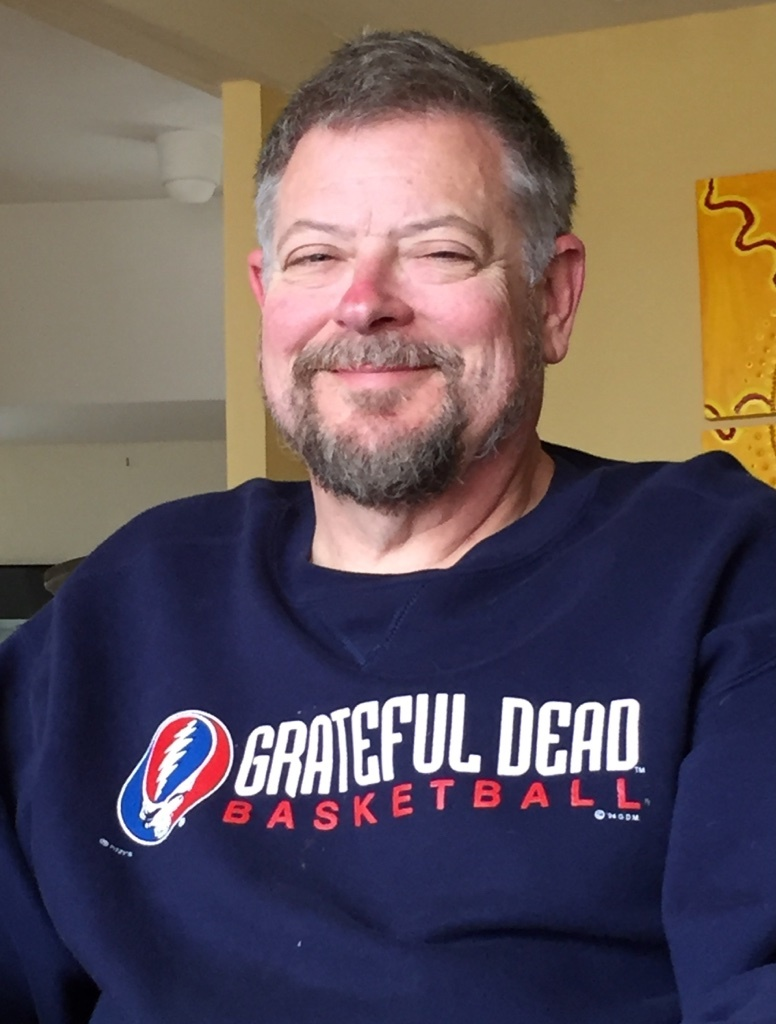
- Bob Bralove, 2016

Background information
- Born: Robert Bralove
- Origin: United States
- Genres: Rock, Psychedelic rock, Experimental music, Electronic music
- Occupations: Keyboardist, producer, sound engineer, composer, synth programmer
- Instruments: Keyboards, Synthesizer, Piano, MIDI systems
- Years active: 1980s–present
- Labels: Grateful Dead Records, Relix
- Website: www.bobbralove.com

Bob Bralove is a keyboard–synthesizer player who worked as a sound technician with the Grateful Dead from 1986 to 1995. Throughout his tenure, he performed as an auxiliary musician throughout "Drums" and "Space", the band's signature aleatoric music segments. Accordingly, he played a key role in their integration of MIDI technology, first working with drummers Mickey Hart and Bill Kreutzmann, keyboardist Brent Mydland, and later guitarist Bob Weir and synthesizer/piano player Vince Welnick. He also co-wrote several songs with Weir and Welnick, including "Picasso Moon" on Built to Last (1989) and "Way to Go Home" and "Easy Answers", which were slated to appear on the band's unfinished fourteenth studio album. (A live reconstruction, Ready or Not, was ultimately released in 2019 and contains both songs.) Perhaps his most significant project with the band was curating excerpts from "Drums" and "Space" on Infrared Roses, a 1991 compilation album. "Parallelogram" and "Little Nemo in Nightland" are some of his most notable "compositions" from this release.

Bralove was also a member and producer of the Psychedelic Keyboard Trio, along with Welnick and fellow former Grateful Dead keyboardist Tom Constanten. Bralove and Constanten also collaborated as Dose Hermanos, a showcase for their improvisational keyboard work; since 1998, they have toured irregularly and released five albums under the moniker. Bralove also worked with Stevie Wonder, setting up and programming Wonder's synthesizers including while he was touring.
