= Dick's Picks Volume 15 =

Live album by Grateful Dead
- Released: October 18, 1999
- Recorded: September 3, 1977
- Venue: Raceway Park in Englishtown, New Jersey
- Genres: Rock, jam
- Length: 176:43
- Label: Grateful Dead

Grateful Dead chronology
Dick's Picks Volume 14 (1999)	Dick's Picks Volume 15 (1999)	So Many Roads (1965–1995) (1999)

Professional ratings
Review scores
Source	Rating
Allmusic	3/5 stars
The Music Box	4/5 stars
Rolling Stone	4/5 stars

Dick's Picks Volume 15 is the 15th live album in the Dick's Picks series of releases by the Grateful Dead. It features the complete show recorded on September 3, 1977, at Raceway Park in Englishtown, New Jersey. Also appearing at the event were the New Riders of the Purple Sage and The Marshall Tucker Band. The band performed to a crowd estimated at between 100,000 and 150,000 attendees.

Comparisons to unofficial releases reveal that there is an edit to the song "He's Gone," removing a mistake by Garcia where he repeated the song's chorus rather than singing the bridge.

This was the first Dick's Picks released after the death of Dick Latvala for whom the series is named. The liner notes include a picture of Latvala with the following message:

People of Earth...
Greetings from the great beyond. I am contacting you at this time to assure you that all is well and to let you know that Dick's Picks shall continue in my absence just as before. My plans for future releases are well known to my teammates and they have sworn with their blood to remain true to the cause. I hope this release will alleviate any doubts concerning my posthumous powers.

— The Archivist formerly known as Dick

This is the first Dick's Picks to use the High Definition Compatible Digital (HDCD) CD format.

== Enclosure and review ==
The release includes two pieces of paper stapled together in the middle, yielding an eight-page enclosure. The front duplicates the cover of the CD and the back contains a circular drawing of a grey cyclopes skull with a single crossbone backed by blue sky with some clouds.

Inside, the first page on the left features a color photograph of the band on stage, and the page on the right lists the contents of and credits for the release. The two pages in the middle contain a two-page review of the show, and the last two pages contain a small photograph of Dick Latvala and a large photo, from high up and behind the stage, of the crowd at the show. The "People of Earth" message mentioned previously appears on the bottom of the left side of these two pages, under the photo of Dick.

=== Review by Martha Megill ===
The titles of the review are "Concert Attendance Takes Planning", in fine print, above "Grateful Dead Fan Is Happy, Satisfied" in bold typeface. The review is an account of the show from the Asbury Park Press, dated September 6, 1977 and written in the first person by Martha Megill.

The review is very personal and starts by describing Megill's three-mile walk from where she and her friends parked to the concert area. After describing a few ways she and her friends found to mitigate the hot weather, the author briefly mentions being barely able to hear the shows by the backup bands, the New Riders of the Purple Sage and The Marshall Tucker Band.

About two-thirds of the way through the article Martha mentions that "by 6 p.m. the air had cooled slightly," and it was finally "time for the Dead." Although the first song "proved to be no louder than the previous music," she writes that "the sound improved gradually" and "by the last set the sound was great."

Megill claims that their song "Truckin' ", the last song before the encore, was "the highlight of the entire day" and that the "One hundred thousand people [in attendance] were ecstatic." She then ends the article by stating that she agrees "wholeheartedly with the many bumper stickers I saw. 'There Ain't Nothin' Like a Grateful Dead Concert'." She closes her review by asserting that everyone there heard "some excellent music" and had "a real good time."

== Track listing ==
Disc one

First set:

1. "Introduction" (Scher) – 0:41
2. "Promised Land" (Chuck Berry) – 5:08
3. "They Love Each Other" (Jerry Garcia, Robert Hunter) – 7:41
4. "Me & My Uncle" (John Phillips) – 3:52
5. "Mississippi Half-Step Uptown Toodleloo" (Garcia, Hunter) – 13:34
6. "Looks Like Rain" (Bob Weir, John Barlow) – 7:52
7. "Peggy-O" (traditional) – 9:18
8. "New Minglewood Blues" (Noah Lewis) – 5:20
9. "Friend of the Devil" (Garcia, John Dawson, Hunter) – 8:13
10. "The Music Never Stopped" (Weir, Barlow) – 7:03

Disc two

Second set:

1. "Bertha" (Garcia, Hunter) – 8:35 →
2. "Good Lovin' " (Rudy Clark, Arthur Resnick) – 6:00
3. "Loser" (Garcia, Hunter) – 8:37
4. "Estimated Prophet" (Barlow, Weir) – 9:29 →
5. "Eyes of the World" (Garcia, Hunter) – 13:17
6. "Samson and Delilah" (Rev. Gary Davis) – 6:40

Disc three

1. "He's Gone" (Garcia, Hunter) – 14:18 →
2. "Not Fade Away" (Buddy Holly, Norman Petty) – 19:58 →
3. "Truckin' " (Garcia, Phil Lesh, Weir, Hunter) – 10:05

Encore:

4. "Terrapin Station" (Garcia, Hunter) – 11:02

== Personnel ==
Grateful Dead:

- Jerry Garcia – lead guitar, vocals
- Bill Kreutzmann – drums
- Mickey Hart – drums
- Phil Lesh – bass, vocals
- Bob Weir – guitar, vocals
- Donna Jean Godchaux – vocals
- Keith Godchaux – keyboards

Production:

- Dick Latvala – tape archivist
- Gecko Graphics – design
- Betty Cantor-Jackson – recording
- Jeffrey Norman – CD mastering
- John Cutler – magnetic scrutinizer
- Jim Anderson, John Oliver – photography
- Martha Megill – liner notes; from Asbury Park Press, September 6, 1977.

== See also ==
- Dick's Picks series
- Grateful Dead discography
