= Ready or Not (Grateful Dead album) =

Live album by Grateful Dead
- Released: November 22, 2019
- Recorded: June 23, 1992–April 2, 1995
- Genre: Rock
- Length: 81:22
- Label: Rhino
- Producer: Grateful Dead

Grateful Dead chronology
Dave's Picks Volume 32 (2019)	Ready or Not (2019)	Dave's Picks Volume 33 (2020)

Ready or Not is a live album by the rock band the Grateful Dead. It was released on November 22, 2019, through Rhino Entertainment. Featuring live recordings from 1992 through 1995, the album contains nine compositions originally intended for the band's never-finished fourteenth studio album.

== Unfinished Grateful Dead album ==
In February 1992, the Grateful Dead began work on recording a new studio album. That album was never completed, and the group disbanded in 1995 following the death of Jerry Garcia. Most likely the unfinished studio album would have included the songs that appear on Ready or Not.

== Critical reception ==
On AllMusic, Fred Thomas wrote, "Ready or Not indeed offers a glimpse of what another studio album from what turned out to be the group's later phase would have sounded like, only with the buffer of comfort that comes from them working out the songs on-stage. It's a document not quite like any of the Dead's hundreds of other archival releases, zeroing in on unfamiliar and exciting material."

== Track listing ==
Ready or Not track listing
No.	Title	Writer(s)	Lead vocals	Length
1.	"Liberty" (October 14, 1994 at Madison Square Garden)	Jerry Garcia; Robert Hunter	Garcia	6:14
2.	"Eternity" (April 2, 1995 at Memphis Pyramid)	Bob Weir; Rob Wasserman; Willie Dixon	Weir	10:10
3.	"Lazy River Road" (March 25, 1993 at Dean Smith Center)	Garcia; Hunter	Garcia	6:54
4.	"Samba in the Rain" (March 30, 1995 at Omni Coliseum)	Vince Welnick; Hunter	Welnick	6:44
5.	"So Many Roads" (June 23, 1992 at Star Lake Amphitheatre)	Garcia; Hunter	Garcia	7:33
6.	"Way to Go Home" (June 28, 1992 at Deer Creek Music Center)	Welnick; Bob Bralove; Hunter	Welnick	6:02
7.	"Corrina" (October 14, 1994 at Madison Square Garden)	Weir; Mickey Hart; Hunter	Weir	17:20
8.	"Easy Answers" (September 13, 1993 at The Spectrum)	Hunter; Bralove; Weir; Welnick; Wasserman	Weir	7:00
9.	"Days Between" (December 11, 1994 at Oakland Arena)	Garcia; Hunter	Garcia	13:25
Total length:				81:22

Note: "Corrina" is edited to 15:27 on CD editions of the album.

== Personnel ==
Grateful Dead

- Jerry Garcia – guitar, vocals
- Bob Weir – guitar, vocals
- Phil Lesh – bass, vocals
- Bill Kreutzmann – drums
- Mickey Hart – drums
- Vince Welnick – keyboards, vocals

Production

- Produced by Grateful Dead
- Produced for release by David Lemieux
- Associate Producers: Doran Tyson & Ivette Ramos
- Recording: Dan Healy, John Cutler
- Mastering: David Glasser
- Cover art: Ruben Perez
- Photos: Bob Minkin
- Design: Steve Vance
- Liner notes: Jesse Jarnow

== Charts ==
Chart (2019)	Peak position
US Billboard 200	172
