= Wall of Sound (Grateful Dead) =

1974 public address system

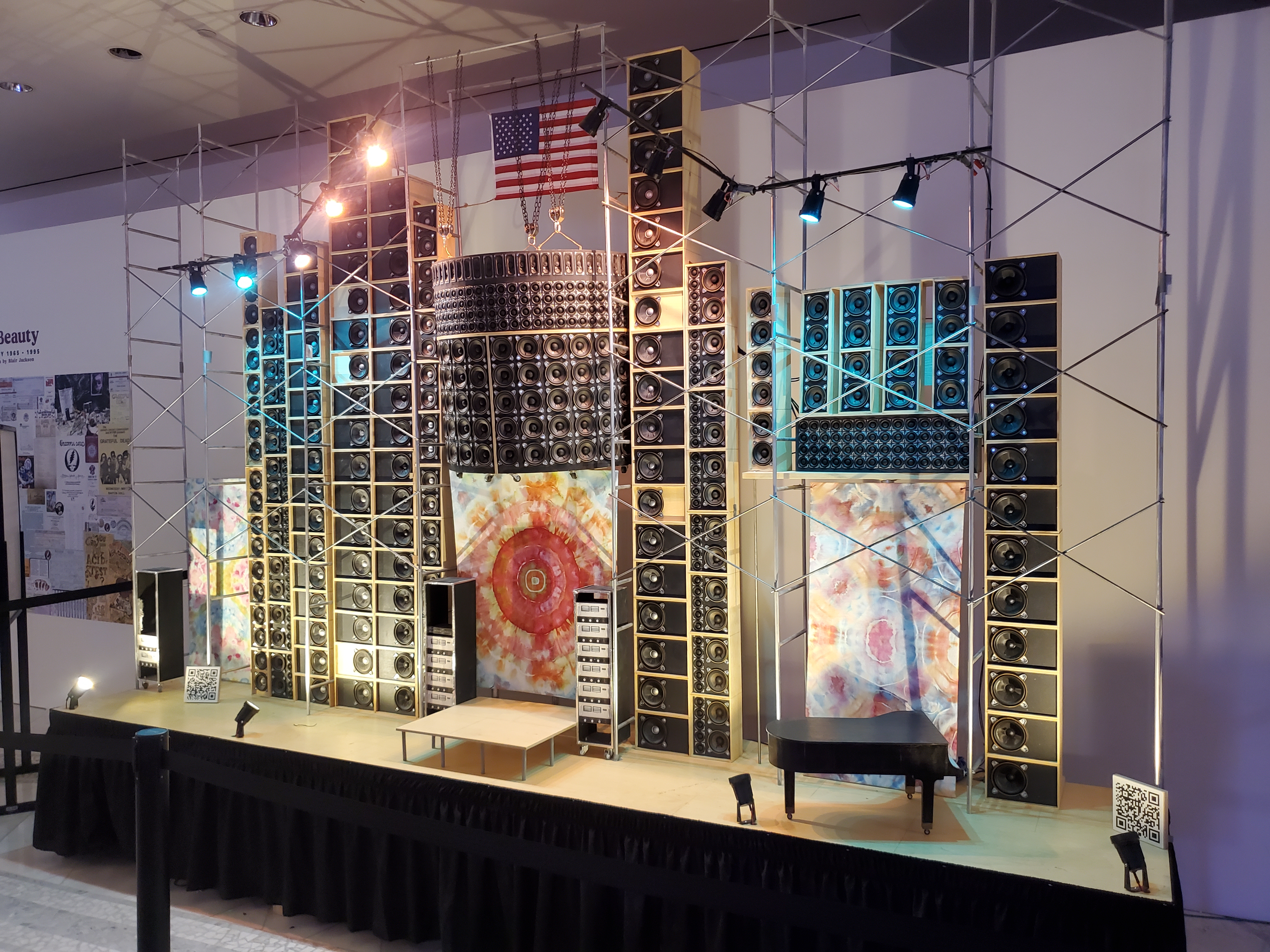
A model of the "Wall of Sound", on display at the Dead Forever Experience exhibit at the Venetian

The Wall of Sound was an enormous sound reinforcement system designed in 1972 specifically for the Grateful Dead's live performances. The largest concert sound system built at that time, the Wall of Sound fulfilled lead designer Owsley "Bear" Stanley's desire for a distortion-free sound system that could also serve as its own monitoring system. Due to its size, weight and resulting expense, the full Wall of Sound was only used from March to October of 1974.

== History ==
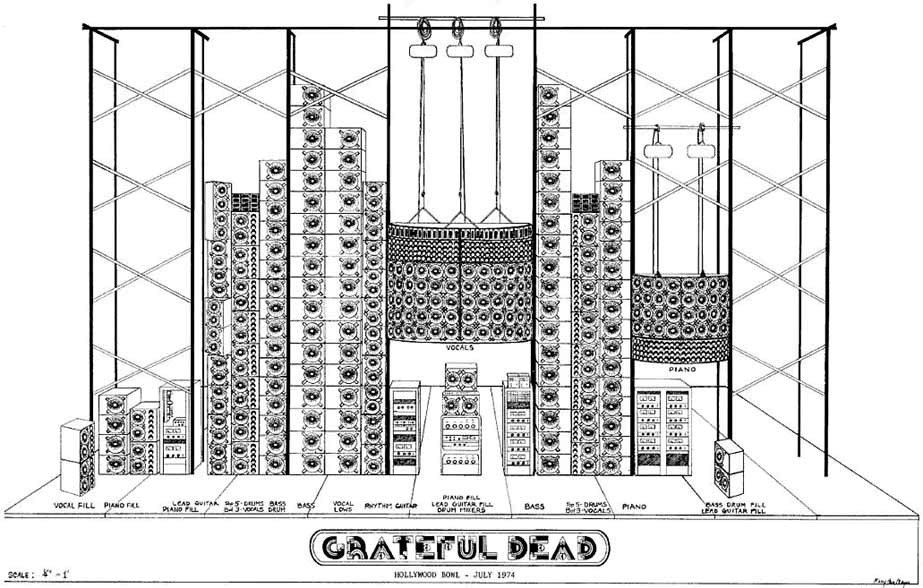
Schematic drawing of the Grateful Dead's wall of sound

Stanley and Dan Healy and Mark Raizene of the Grateful Dead's sound crew, in collaboration with Ron Wickersham, Rick Turner, and John Curl of Alembic designed the sound reinforcement system in an effort to deliver high-quality sound to attendees of Grateful Dead concerts, which were drawing crowds of 100,000 or more at the time. The Wall of Sound combined six independent sound systems using eleven separate channels. Vocals, lead guitar, rhythm guitar, and piano each had their own channel and set of speakers. Phil Lesh's bass was piped through a quadraphonic encoder that sent signals from each of the four strings to a separate channel and set of speakers for each string. Another channel amplified the bass drum, and two more channels carried the snares, tom-toms, and cymbals. Because each speaker carried just one instrument or vocalist, the sound was exceptionally clear and free of intermodulation distortion.

Several setups have been reported for The Wall of Sound:

1. 604 total speakers, powered by 89 300-watt solid-state and three 350-watt vacuum tube amplifiers generating a total of 26,400 watts of power.
2. 586 JBL speakers and 54 Electro-Voice tweeters, powered by 48 600-watt McIntosh MC-2300 amplifiers generating a total of 28,800 watts of continuous (RMS) power).

This system projected high-quality playback at six hundred feet (180 m) with an acceptable sound projected for one-quarter mile (400 m), at which point wind interference degraded it. Although it was not called a line array at the time, the Wall of Sound was the first large-scale line array used in modern sound reinforcement systems. The Wall of Sound was perhaps the second-largest non-permanent sound system ever built.

There were multiple sets of staging and scaffolding that toured with the Grateful Dead. In order to accommodate the time needed to set up and tear down the system, the band would perform with one set while another would "leapfrog" to the next show. According to band historian Dennis McNally, there were two sets of scaffolding. According to Stanley, there were three sets. Four semi-trailers and 21 crew members were required to haul and set up the 75-ton Wall.

The Wall of Sound is the name some people gave to a super powerful, extremely accurate PA system that I designed and supervised the building of in 1973 for the Grateful Dead. It was a massive wall of speaker arrays set behind the musicians, which they themselves controlled without a front of house mixer. It did not need any delay towers to reach a distance of half a mile [800 m] from the stage without degradation.

—"Bear" Stanley

Though the initial framework and a rudimentary form of the system was unveiled at Stanford University's Maples Pavilion on February 9, 1973 (every tweeter blew as the band began their first number), the Grateful Dead did not begin to tour with the full system until a year later. The completed Wall of Sound made its touring debut on March 23, 1974, at the Cow Palace in Daly City, California. A recording of the performance was released in 2002 as Dick's Picks Volume 24.

== Technical challenges ==
The Wall of Sound acted as its own monitoring system, and it was therefore assembled behind the band so the members could hear exactly what their audience was hearing. Because of this, Stanley and Alembic designed a special microphone system to prevent feedback. This placed matched pairs of condenser microphones spaced 60 mm apart and wired in reverse polarity from each other. The vocalist sang into the top microphone, and the lower mic picked up whatever other sound was present in the stage environment. The signals were added together using a differential summing amp so that the sound common to both mics (the sound from the Wall) was canceled, and only the vocals were amplified.

The Wall was very efficient for its day, but suffered from multiple drawbacks in addition to its sheer size. Frequent guest keyboardist Ned Lagin (best known for performing experimental interludes with various permutations of Lesh, Jerry Garcia and drummer Bill Kreutzmann throughout 1974 set breaks) preferred to play through the powerful vocal subsystem (considered to be the best part of the system); however, the group's sound crew often neglected to switch between his quadrophonic input and the vocal input during long sequences, resulting in few of his contributions being recorded. Additionally, as many as two channels of his input would still be lost in the mix when the system was working properly. The Wall's quadraphonic format did not translate well to soundboard tapes made during the period, as the sound was compressed into an unnatural stereo format and suffered from a pronounced tinniness.

== Retirement ==
The rising cost of fuel and personnel, as well as friction among many of the newer crew members and associated hangers-on, contributed to the band's "retirement" after the 16 to 20 October 1974 shows in San Francisco's Winterland Ballroom. A selection of these final performances can be seen in The Grateful Dead Movie.

The Wall of Sound was disassembled, and when the Dead began touring again in 1976, it was replaced with a more logistically practical sound system.

== Legacy ==
On 14 October 2021 during a Sotheby's auction called "From the Vault: Property from the Grateful Dead and Friends" several portions of the Wall sold including a portion of the center vocal cluster and a handmade Alembic speaker cabinet for $17,640. Also sold were multiple McIntosh MC-2300 amplifiers, one sold for $94,500.

The Wall of Sound was used during these 1974 recordings:

- Dick's Picks Volume 24 - March 23 at the Cow Palace in Daly City, California
- Dave's Picks Volume 9 - May 14 at the Harry Adams Field House in Missoula, Montana
- Playing in the Band - May 21 at Hec Edmundson Pavilion in Seattle, Washington
- Road Trips Volume 2 Number 3 - June 16 at the Iowa State Fairgrounds & on June 18 at Freedom Hall in Louisville, Kentucky
- Dick's Picks Volume 12 - June 26 Providence, Rhode Island & June 28 at the Boston Garden in Boston, Massachusetts
- Dave's Picks Volume 34 - June 23 at the Jai-Alai Fronton in Miami, Florida
- Dave's Picks Volume 17 - July 19 at Selland Arena in Fresno, California
- Dave's Picks Volume 2 - July 31 at Dillon Stadium in Hartford, Connecticut
- Dick's Picks Volume 31 - August 4 & 5 at the Philadelphia Civic Center, Pennsylvania & August 6 at Roosevelt Stadium, New Jersey
- The Grateful Dead Movie Soundtrack - October 16 to 20 at the closing of Winterland Ballroom in San Francisco, California
