= Unfinished Grateful Dead album =

Album

The rock band the Grateful Dead had worked on songs in the early 1990s for an album that was intended to be the follow-up to Built to Last (1989), but it was never completed. This has sometimes been referred to as the unfinished Grateful Dead album or the "missing album". The band began work on the album in February 1992. After Jerry Garcia's death in 1995, the band considered finishing the album, but in the end they did not do so.

On November 22, 2019, the Grateful Dead organization released a live album called Ready or Not. It contains nine songs, recorded during performances between 1992 and 1995. All the songs are from the list given below.

== Overview ==
In the early 1990s, the Grateful Dead had been working on new songs. When Jerry Garcia died in 1995, the band decided to break up and this album was never finished. Work on the unfinished album began in February 1992 in West Marin County in California, at a studio the band called "the Site", which was located on a hill with scenic views and occasional views of wildlife. At the time, Jerry Garcia was not particularly interested or focused upon the project, which discouraged its impetus. The studio session work did not have any lead vocals from songs that Garcia performed lead vocals on, and Garcia's guitar work on the tracks was described as "rudimentary." The tracks for the new album were incomplete.

In 1995, Phil Lesh was performing studio work on the unfinished album. At this time, Lesh stated that the album "... doesn't have much Jerry on it", referring to Garcia. In 1997, Bob Weir stated that the album could potentially be completed, but that it would take additional collaboration from the remaining band members. Weir and others stated at this time that they expected for a collaboration to finish the album to occur sometime in 1998. In August 1999, Lesh stated that he felt the content from the studio sessions did not merit use on an album, and that efforts to improve the content would not equate to what Garcia would have performed. In 1999, Dennis McNally, spokesperson for the Grateful Dead, stated that using another guitarist to fill-in for Garcia "would have been unconscionable", and that "without Garcia, there is no last album." So the album never came into fruition.

The box set So Many Roads (1965–1995) has six songs from live concert performance and rehearsal tracks from the unfinished Grateful Dead album.

This album would have had the most variety of lead singers for songs of any of the Grateful Dead's studio albums, other than 1970's American Beauty. There were four singers: Garcia, Weir, Lesh and Vince Welnick.

== Track listing ==
The following are the songs that were planned for the unfinished album. "Childhood's End", "If the Shoe Fits", and "Wave to the Wind" were not included in Ready or Not.

- "Liberty" (Jerry Garcia, Robert Hunter)
- "Samba in the Rain" (Vince Welnick, Hunter)
- "So Many Roads" (Garcia, Hunter)
- "Days Between" (Garcia, Hunter)
- "Corrina" (Bob Weir, Mickey Hart, Hunter)
- "If the Shoe Fits" (Phil Lesh, Andrew Charles)
- "Easy Answers" (Weir, Bob Bralove, Rob Wasserman, Welnick, Hunter)
- "Eternity" (Weir, Wasserman, Willie Dixon)
- "Way to Go Home" (Welnick, Bralove, Hunter)
- "Childhood's End" (Lesh)
- "Wave to the Wind" (Lesh, Hunter)
- "Lazy River Road" (Garcia, Hunter)
