= Shoreline Amphitheatre =

Concert venue in Mountain View, California, United States

- "Shoreline"
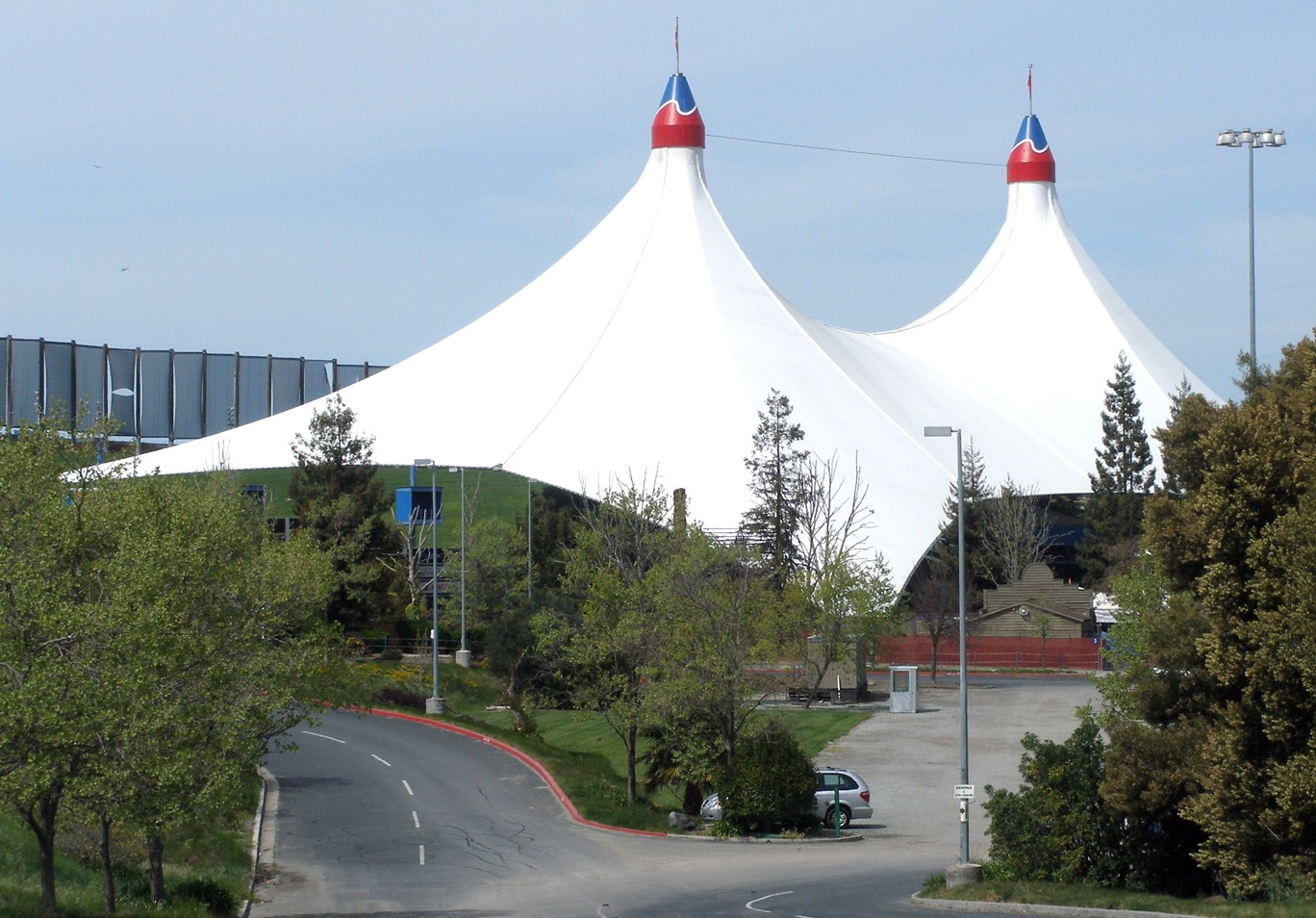
- Shoreline Amphitheatre as seen from ground level
- Interactive map of Shoreline Amphitheatre
- Address: One Amphitheatre Parkway
- Location: Mountain View, California
- Coordinates: 37.426778°N 122.080733°W
- Owner: City of Mountain View
- Operator: Live Nation
- Seating type: reserved, lawn
- Capacity: 22,500
- Type: Outdoor amphitheatre

Construction
- Opened: 1986

Website
- www.livenation.com

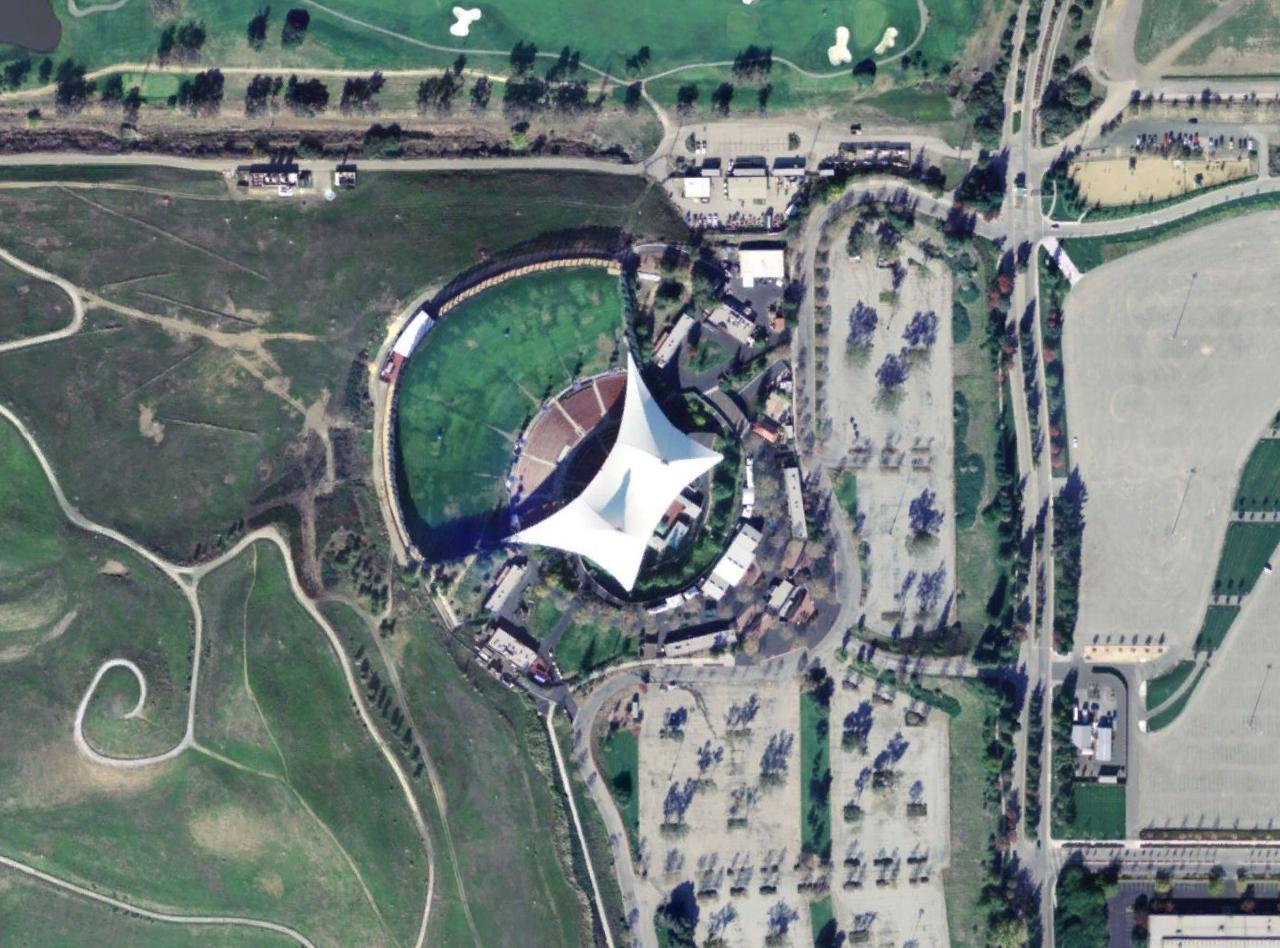
Aerial photograph of Shoreline Amphitheatre, with the parking lots and the neighboring golf course.

Shoreline Amphitheatre is an outdoor amphitheater located in Mountain View, California, in the San Francisco Bay Area. The venue has a capacity of 22,500, with 6,500 reserved seats and 16,000 general admission on the lawn. When the parking lot is utilized for festival stages, the total capacity of the venue can reach 30,000. The venue has hosted popular music festivals such as Lollapalooza and Ozzfest, and also developer conferences such as the Google I/O.

== Construction and repairs ==
The amphitheater was built in 1985–1986 by the city of Mountain View, in cooperation with local promoter Bill Graham, as part of the Shoreline Park project, and opened to the public in the summer of 1986. The amphitheater was built on part of a landfill owned by the city of Mountain View. Graham designed the amphitheater to resemble The Grateful Dead's "steal your face" logo when seen from overhead. The 85,000 square foot (7,900 m^{2}) tent covering the amphitheater was the largest of its kind in the United States when it was built.

During the first season, there were numerous complaints of the odor of garbage wafting from the adjoining landfill into the amphitheater audience. In addition, methane gas rising from decomposing garbage under the amphitheater itself caused several small fires in the lawn seating area, causing minor injuries to some attendees. Before the second season opened in 1987, two methane recovery systems were installed. The first was installed in the adjoining landfill at a cost of $355,000, consisting of 95 wells drilled into the site to collect methane gas and siphon it away. The second was installed in the amphitheater itself, and required removing the entire amphitheater lawn, installing the collection system, and replacing the lawn, at a cost of $2.5 million.

On April 2, 1987, a 15 foot (4.6 m) tear in the fabric of the tent was noticed. Over the next two days, during moderate 20 miles per hour (32 km/h) winds, the tear spread into a massive 100 foot by 50 foot hole. This then induced a second tear, leaving the tent in tatters. The tent had been guaranteed by the manufacturer to withstand winds of up to 100 miles per hour (160 km/h). Engineers from the manufacturer were sent to examine the tent and determine the cause of the problem. The tent was repaired in time for the scheduled season opening on May 2.

On February 2, 1998, a major El Niño storm caused a power outage that disabled the pumps that normally drain rainfall from the amphitheater. Combined with torrential rains, this caused water to fill the bottom of the amphitheater bowl to a depth of more than 15 feet, ruining the stage and much of the backstage infrastructure and causing $2.5 million in damage. The damage was repaired by May 17 when the season's opening concert took place.

== Events ==
The premiere season was during the summer of 1986. It was planned to open with a concert by the Grateful Dead, but they cancelled due to Jerry Garcia's ill health. The first performance at the amphitheater was comedienne Roseanne Barr, opening for Julio Iglesias on June 29, 1986. The Grateful Dead played their first concert at Shoreline on October 2, 1987, and played there another 38 times; with their final appearance on June 4, 1995. Jerry Garcia played a further three shows as part of the Jerry Garcia Band.

Until his death in 2019, the final concert at Shoreline was usually an Eddie Money concert in late September, as the Shoreline shows represented his homecoming concert.

The amphitheater was the site of two homicides. In 2015, a man was fatally shot backstage during a Wiz Khalifa concert. In 2022, a man died as a result of a fistfight involving the Hells Angels during a Chris Stapleton concert.

== See also ==
- List of contemporary amphitheatres
- List of concert halls
- Live Nation
