= So Many Roads (1965–1995) =

1999 box set by the Grateful Dead

Live album and box set by Grateful Dead
- Released: November 7, 1999
- Recorded: November 3, 1965 – July 9, 1995
- Genres: Jam, folk rock, psychedelic rock
- Length: 386:22
- Labels: Arista (1999); Rhino Records (2004)

Grateful Dead chronology
Dick's Picks Volume 15 (1999)	So Many Roads (1965–1995) (1999)	Dick's Picks Volume 16 (2000)

Grateful Dead concert box set chronology
So Many Roads (1965–1995) (1999)	Fillmore West 1969: The Complete Recordings (2005)

Professional ratings
Review scores
Source	Rating
Allmusic	4.5/5 stars
Rolling Stone	4/5 stars
Encyclopedia of Popular Music	5/5 stars

So Many Roads (1965–1995) is a five-disc box set by the Grateful Dead. Primarily consisting of concert recordings from different periods of the band's history, it also contains several songs recorded in the studio. All but one of the forty-two tracks (forty-seven songs; duration: 6 hours, 26 minutes) were previously unreleased. The album was released on November 7, 1999. It was certified a gold record by the RIAA on April 12, 2000.

The title of the album comes from the Jerry Garcia and Robert Hunter song of the same name; the version included is from the group's final concert. A single disc sampler called So Many Roads (1965–1995) Sampler was released to various media outlets.

After track two, the fifth disc contains live or rehearsal versions of songs that apparently would have gone into the making of the band's unfinished fourteenth studio album.

Of particular interest to many DeadHeads, many of whom are attracted to the Grateful Dead for the often improvisational nature of their live performances, So Many Roads (1965–1995) contains six "jams":

1. Disc two, track two: "Beautiful Jam" - 4:33
2. Disc two, track five: "Watkins Glen Soundcheck Jam" – 19:29
3. Disc two, track six:
  "Dark Star Jam" - 8:28 →
  "Spanish Jam" - 4:10 →
  "U.S. Blues" - 6:50
4. Disc four, track nine: "Jam out of Terrapin" – 5:20
5. Disc five, track two: "Jam Out of Foolish Heart" – 5:57
6. Disc five, track seven: "Jam into Days Between" – 7:04

In addition, there are many significantly extended tracks, including fourteen tracks over ten minutes long, and two tracks over twenty minutes long ("Dark Star / China Cat Sunflower / The Eleven", on Disc One, and "That's It for the Other One", on Disc Two.

== Track listing ==
=== Disc one ===
1. "Can't Come Down" (Grateful Dead) – 2:59
2. "Caution (Do Not Stop On Tracks)" (Grateful Dead) – 3:12
  - (tracks 1–2 studio recordings) Autumn Sessions 1965-11-03 (Note: Later released on Birth of the Dead and 30 Trips Around the Sun. Recorded using the band's short-lived name "Emergency Crew")
3. "You Don't Have to Ask" (Grateful Dead) – 3:55
  - Fillmore Auditorium, San Francisco, California 1966-07-16 (Note: Edited version of the performance) (Note: More from this concert released on Birth of the Dead)
4. "On The Road Again" (Traditional, arranged by the Grateful Dead) – 2:49
  - Los Angeles, California, 1966-03-12
5. "Cream Puff War" (Jerry Garcia) – 5:37
  - Fillmore Auditorium, San Francisco, 1966-07-16
6. "I Know You Rider" (Traditional, arranged by the Grateful Dead) – 4:15 (Note: Originally released on Vintage Dead)
  - Avalon Ballroom, San Francisco, 1966
7. "The Same Thing" (Willie Dixon) – 11:37
  - Winterland Arena, San Francisco, 1967-03-18
8. "Dark Star" (Grateful Dead/Hunter) – 7:22 →
  "China Cat Sunflower" (Garcia/Hunter) – 4:39 →
  "The Eleven" (Lesh/Hunter) – 13:24
  - Carousel Ballroom, San Francisco, 1968-03-16
9. "Clementine" (Lesh/Hunter) – 7:48
  - Crystal Ballroom, Portland, Oregon 1968-02-02
10. "Mason's Children" (Garcia/Lesh/Weir/Hunter) – 3:39
  - (studio recording) outtake from Workingman's Dead February 1970
11. "To Lay Me Down" (Garcia/Hunter) – 5:38
  - (studio recording) outtake from American Beauty Summer 1970

=== Disc two ===
1. "That's It For The Other One" (Grateful Dead) – 19:34 (Note: Later released with complete concert on Fillmore West 1969: The Complete Recordings)
  - Fillmore West, San Francisco, 1969-02-27
2. "Beautiful Jam" (Grateful Dead) – 4:33
  - Capitol Theatre, Port Chester, New York 1971-02-18 (Note: Later released with complete concert on American Beauty (50th Anniversary Deluxe Edition))
3. "Chinatown Shuffle" (Ron McKernan) – 3:00
  - Civic Hall, Rotterdam, The Netherlands 1972-05-11 (Note: Later released with complete concert on Europe '72: The Complete Recordings)
4. "Sing Me Back Home" (Merle Haggard) – 10:30
  - County Fairgrounds, Veneta, Oregon 1972-08-27 (Note: Later released with complete concert on Sunshine Daydream)
5. "Watkins Glen Soundcheck Jam" (Grateful Dead) – 19:29
  - Grand Prix Race Course, Watkins Glen, New York 1973-07-27
6. "Dark Star Jam" (Grateful Dead) – 8:28 →
  "Spanish Jam" (Grateful Dead) – 4:10 →
  "U.S. Blues" (Garcia/Hunter) – 6:50
  - Jai Alai Fronton, Miami, Florida 1974-06-23 (Note: Later released with complete concert on Dave's Picks Volume 34)

=== Disc three ===
1. "Eyes of the World" (Garcia/Hunter) – 18:14
  - Winterland Arena, San Francisco, 1974-10-19 (Note: Later released in edited form on The Grateful Dead Movie Soundtrack)
2. "The Wheel" (Garcia/Hunter) – 11:30
  - Auditorium Theater, Chicago, Illinois 1976-06-29 (Note: Edited version of the performance)
3. "Stella Blue" (Garcia/Hunter) – 11:38
  - Rupp Arena, Lexington, Kentucky 1978-04-21
4. "Estimated Prophet" (Barlow/Weir) – 11:36
  - Red Rocks Amphitheatre, Morrison, Colorado 1979-08-12 (Note: Later released with complete concert on Enjoying the Ride)
5. "The Music Never Stopped" (Barlow/Weir) – 7:24
  - Warfield Theatre, San Francisco, 1980-10-14 (Note: More tracks from this date previously released on Reckoning)
6. "Shakedown Street" (Garcia/Hunter) – 17:23
  - San Francisco Civic Auditorium, San Francisco 1984-12-31

=== Disc four ===
1. "Cassidy" (Weir/Barlow) – 5:56
  - Meadowlands Arena, East Rutherford, New Jersey 1985-11-10
2. "Hey Pocky Way" (Modeliste/Neville/Nocentelli/Porter) – 6:00
  - Greensboro Coliseum, Greensboro, North Carolina 1989-03-31
3. "Believe It Or Not" (Garcia/Hunter) – 5:09
  - (studio recording) outtake from Built to Last 1989
4. "Playing in the Band" (Hart/Hunter/Weir) – 12:24
  - Laguna Seca, Monterey, California 1988-07-29
5. "Gentlemen, Start Your Engines" (Barlow/Mydland) – 4:48
  - (studio recording) outtake from Built to Last 1989
6. "Death Don't Have No Mercy" (Davis) – 6:39
  - Shoreline Amphitheatre, Mountain View, California 1989-09-29
7. "Scarlet Begonias" (Garcia/Hunter) – 8:10 →
  "Fire on the Mountain" (Hart/Hunter) – 11:24
  - Copps Coliseum, Hamilton, Ontario 1990-03-22 (Note: Later released with complete concert on Spring 1990)
8. "Bird Song" (Garcia/Hunter) – 13:06
  - Nassau Coliseum, Uniondale, New York 1990-03-29 (Note: Later released with complete concert on Spring 1990 (The Other One) & Wake Up to Find Out) (Note: Branford Marsalis sat in with the band for this song.)
9. "Jam out of Terrapin" (Grateful Dead) – 5:20
  - Richfield Coliseum, Richfield Township, Summit County, Ohio 1990-09-08

=== Disc five ===
1. "Terrapin Station" (Garcia/Hunter) – 13:43
  - Madison Square Garden, New York City 1991-09-12
2. "Jam Out of Foolish Heart" (Grateful Dead) – 5:57
  - Madison Square Garden, New York 1990-09-18
3. "Way To Go Home" (Bralove/Hunter/Welnick) – 6:24
  - The Palace, Auburn Hills, Michigan 1994-07-31
4. "Liberty" (Garcia/Hunter) – 5:56
  - The Omni, Atlanta, Georgia 1994-03-30 (Note: This performance also used for the "Liberty" music video (see View from the Vault, Volume Two))
5. "Lazy River Road" (Garcia/Hunter) – 6:56
6. "Eternity" (Dixon/Wasserman/Weir) – 7:35
  - (tracks 5–6 studio recordings) rehearsals for unfinished fourteenth studio album 1993-02-18
7. "Jam into Days Between" (Grateful Dead) – 7:04
  - (studio recording) rehearsals for unfinished fourteenth studio album 1993-02-09
8. "Days Between" (Garcia/Hunter) – 11:05
  - (studio recording) rehearsals for unfinished fourteenth studio album 1993-02-18
9. "Whiskey in the Jar" (Traditional, arranged by Grateful Dead) – 5:18
  - (studio recording) rehearsals for unfinished fourteenth studio album 1993-02-16
10. "So Many Roads" (Garcia/Hunter) – 9:24
  - Soldier Field, Chicago 1995-07-09 (Note: Edited version of the performance)

== Personnel ==
- Jerry Garcia – lead guitar, vocals (1965–1995)
- Bill Kreutzmann – drums (1965–1995)
- Phil Lesh – bass guitar, vocals (1965–1995)
- Bob Weir – guitar, vocals (1965–1995)
- Ron "Pigpen" McKernan – keyboards, harmonica, vocals (1965 – July 17, 1972)
- Mickey Hart – drums (September 29, 1967 – February 18, 1971; October 20, 1974 – 1995)
- Tom Constanten – keyboards (November 23, 1968 – January 30, 1970)
- Keith Godchaux – keyboards, vocals (October 19, 1971 – February 17, 1979)
- Donna Jean Godchaux – vocals (December 31, 1971 – February 17, 1979)
- Brent Mydland – keyboards, vocals (April 22, 1979 – July 23, 1990)
- Vince Welnick – keyboards, vocals (September 7, 1990 – 1995)
- Bruce Hornsby – piano, accordion, vocals (September 15, 1990 – March 24, 1992)
- Ned Lagin – keyboards on "Beautiful Jam" and "Dark Star Jam"

== So Many Roads (1965–1995) Sampler ==
So Many Roads (1965–1995) Sampler

Compilation album by The Grateful Dead
- Released: November 1999
- Recorded: July 16, 1966 – March 30, 1994
- Genre: Rock
- Label: Grateful Dead Records

So Many Roads (1965–1995) Sampler was a promotional sampler for the box set So Many Roads (1965–1995). This promo disc was released prior to the release of the box set. "Passenger" was omitted from the final box set release due to lack of space. This track does, however, appear on Dick's Picks Volume 29.

=== Track listing ===
1. "Cream Puff War" (Jerry Garcia) – 5:37
2. "You Don't Have To Ask" (Grateful Dead) – 3:55
3. "Mason's Children" (Garcia/Lesh/Weir/Hunter) – 4:08
4. "Passenger" (Peter Monk, Lesh) – 4:16
  - Fox Theatre, Atlanta 1977-05-19
5. "Estimated Prophet" (Barlow/Weir) – 11:36
6. "The Music Never Stopped" (Barlow/Weir) – 7:24
7. "Shakedown Street" (Garcia/Hunter) – 17:23
8. "Jam Out of Terrapin" (Grateful Dead) – 5:20
9. "Liberty" (Garcia/Hunter) – 5:56
10. "Eternity" (Dixon/Wasserman/Weir) – 7:35

== Charts ==
Chart (1999)	Peak position
US Billboard 200	170
