= So Many Roads (song) =

Song by Grateful Dead

from the album So Many Roads (1965–1995)
- Released: November 7, 1999
- Recorded: July 9, 1995
- Venue: Soldier Field (Chicago)
- Genre: Folk blues
- Length: 9:24 (Note: This timing refers to the July 9, 1995 recording, which appears on the box set as an edited version of the performance.)
- Label: Arista
- Composer: Jerry Garcia
- Lyricist: Robert Hunter

"So Many Roads" is a song by American rock band the Grateful Dead. It was written by lead guitarist and vocalist Jerry Garcia and lyricist Robert Hunter. First appearing in live shows in 1992, it was part of the band's last group of original new songs intended for a never-finished fourteenth studio album. The song's first commercial release was on the box set So Many Roads (1965–1995) in 1999. This version, recorded on July 9, 1995, comes from the band's final performance before their dissolution following Garcia's death the following month.

Reception to "So Many Roads" has been positive, receiving praise for its emotional resonance, particularly in the context of Garcia's death. Further live recordings of the song have been released, including on the live album Ready or Not (2019), which collects songs meant for the band's unfinished album.

== Overview ==
"So Many Roads" stemmed from a recording Hunter made of Garcia running through a chord progression on piano a decade before the song's composition. While Garcia claimed that the progression was unfinished, Hunter encouraged him to "at least give it a run through", resulting in the finished song. Once finished, the song received its live debut on February 22, 1992.

Musically, "So Many Roads" has been described as a folk blues which Salon writer Seth Mnookin likens to "[Bob] Dylan's more straight-ahead efforts", particularly "Knockin' on Heaven's Door". Pitchfork also notes similarities with the Dylan song within the backing vocals occurring at the song's climax. Lyrically, Mnookin describes the song as consisting of "archetypal descriptions of longing and loneliness, mixed with hints of personal and spiritual exploration". Pitchfork characterizes the track as "world-weary and allusion-heavy". Within the lyrics are references to multiple older songs, such as the traditional "K.C. Moan" and Jelly Roll Morton's "Whinin' Boy Blues". Writing for All About Jazz, Doug Collette considers the song to be "particularly poignant (yet ominous)" due to "the nature of [its] reflections on the passage of time". Garcia considered the lyrics to be "Hunter writing from my point of view", commenting that "only a long-term and intimate relationship with a guy as brilliant as Hunter coughs up that kind of result". Band biographer Blair Jackson has been quoted as saying "So Many Roads" "[sounds] as if it had been penned by (or for) some weird troubadour in the autumn of his life".

Bassist Phil Lesh considered "So Many Roads" to be a companion of "Days Between", another Garcia–Hunter composition from the same time, in that they both "seem to encompass Jerry's life from a poetic perspective"; he suggested that Hunter wrote the lyrics to each as a "loving tribute" to Garcia. Lesh also felt the song "unfolds like a farewell", with Garcia's "ragged" yet "expressive" voice "embod[ying] the bone-tired acceptance" of the song. Oliver Trager believes the song to be "part of the same musical tapestry of 'Black Muddy River' and 'Built to Last'", also noting its lyrical allusions to the Grateful Dead's origins as a jug band, its "Van Morrison-style build up", and thematic similarities to "Truckin'", with Trager considering "So Many Roads" to be a latter-day equivalent to that song.

== Reception ==
"So Many Roads" has received positive reviews from critics. Pitchfork describes it as a "powerful late career statement", while Rolling Stone Australia included the song on their list of Garcia's 50 greatest songs, placing it at number 40. Collette considers the song to be "arguably [one] of the finest the pair [of Garcia and Hunter] ever composed". The performance from July 9, 1995 has received particular praise. Pitchfork noted the performance as a highlight of a show which is otherwise a "rough listen", stating that Garcia "finds moments of quiet grace in the thicket of the latter-day Dead's clatter, delivering sparkling solos [and] finally leaning into an extended emotional closing chorus". Live for Live Music also praised this rendition, calling it "gorgeous" and "bittersweet" while describing Garcia's vocals as "raw" and "moving". Mnookin considers this performance to be the "emotional cornerstone and an apt metaphor" of the titular box set. However, he is also critical of the decision to edit the track, going as far as to say that "cutting and splicing the Dead, a band whose audience appreciated an honest, genuine effort above everything else, amounts to nothing less than sacrilege, especially when dealing with some of the last music Uncle Jerry ever made in public". In Rolling Stone's 2026 list of the 100 best Grateful Dead songs, "So Many Roads" was placed at number 80. Writer Dean Budnick argued that the lack of a polished studio version, and the fact that "almost every live version is flawed", kept the song from becoming "one of the band’s biggest and greatest hits". However, he felt that ultimately, the song "transcends its imperfections" and lead to some of Garcia's most "earnest" and "vulnerabl[e]" vocal performances.
