= Seastones =

- Cover of the 1975 LP

Studio album by Ned Lagin
- Released: April 1975 (LP); re-released 1991 (CD); 2018 (two CDs)
- Recorded: February 1975
- Genre: Electronic
- Length: 44:40 (LP); 73:39 (CD); 111:00 (two CDs)
- Label: Round, United Artists (LP); Rykodisc (CD); Ned Lagin (two CDs)
- Producer: Ned Lagin

Alternative cover
- Cover of the 2018 two-CD album

Seastones is an album by American composer and musician Ned Lagin.

In 1975 Lagin released the quadraphonic album of electronic music, (composed between 1970 and 1974), a small part of the complete Seastones composition, on Round Records and then United Artists Records. A new, two-CD album of Seastones was released on March 8, 2018.

== Composition ==
Lagin composed Seastones over the course of five years. It was recorded and mixed in just as many studios, and mastered at a sixth. Much of the album consists of electronically processed traditional instruments and voice, and a cadre of synthesizers (a custom E-mu Modular Synthesizer controlled by and processed through then-cutting-edge computer technology, with software patches and compositions by Lagin; an ARP 2500 and ARP 2600; and a Buchla Modular System). The early computers employed by Lagin included an Interdata 7/16 computer with a high speed arithmetic logic unit and magnetic core memory; an Intel 8080 microprocessor system built by Lagin; and at the beginning of 1975 an Altair 8800. The computer-controlled systems was designed and built for group live performance, with the performers' instruments and voices routed through analog and digital synthesis and processing hardware. Seastones was one of the first commercially released recordings to feature the use of digital computers, and Lagin was the first to perform on stage live with computers. It was also a very early instance of multiple musicians' audio and control signals being interconnected before MIDI.

== Production ==
The album was mixed in quadraphonic sound, released in quad-encoded stereo, and featured guest performances by members of the Grateful Dead, including Jerry Garcia playing processed electric and pedal steel guitars, and voice; Phil Lesh playing electronic Alembic bass; and Mickey Hart on processed percussion. David Crosby (processed voice and electric 12-string guitar), and members of the Jefferson Airplane Grace Slick (processed voice), Spencer Dryden (processed percussion), and David Freiberg (processed voice) also appear on the album.

Seastones was re-released in stereo on CD by Rykodisc in 1990. The CD version includes the original Round Records nine-section Seastones (42:34) from February 1975, and a previously unreleased, six-section version (31:05) from December 1975. Both are partial versions of the full composition, which has not been released. Other unreleased Lagin Seastones-related compositions from the same period include L and Make a Cat Laugh.

A new, two CD album of Seastones was released on March 8, 2018. This album, not a re-issue, presents most but not all of the composition as originally composed but never released or heard before. For this release, Seastones was re-mixed and re-mastered in stereo. It includes most of the original 1970–1974 studio forms, those parts of Lagin's concurrent but unfinished composition L that are shared with Seastones, as well as some of the moment forms generated and incorporated into the composition from live performances that took place from 1973 to 1975. This two CD album contains 83 tracks (54 tracks on CD One and 29 tracks on CD Two) and altogether is 111 minutes long.

== Live performances ==
Ned Lagin performed versions of Seastones with Phil Lesh and with other members of the Grateful Dead at 23 Grateful Dead concerts between June 23, 1974, in Miami, and October 20, 1974, in San Francisco. These took place typically between the first and second sets of the regular Grateful Dead shows. At some concerts, Seastones would form an entire set, and at other shows it would segue into Grateful Dead songs such as "Playing in the Band" or "Dark Star".

There were five live performances of Seastones that occurred outside of Grateful Dead shows: November 28, 1973, June 6, 1975, September 19, 1975, November 15, 1975, and November 22, 1975.

== Critical reception ==
Professional ratings
Review scores
Source	Rating
Allmusic	4/5 stars

On Allmusic, Steven McDonald said, "In short, Seastones is electronic music of the best kind — a shifting sonic landscape out of which the strangest things may emerge."

== Personnel ==
Musicians

- Ned Lagin – piano, clavichord, organ, prepared piano, percussion, synthesizers, computers
- Phil Lesh – electric bass
- Jerry Garcia – electric guitar, voice
- David Crosby – electric twelve-string guitar, voice
- Grace Slick – voice
- David Freiberg – voice
- Mickey Hart – percussion
- Spencer Dryden – percussion

Production

- Produced by Ned Lagin
- Engineering (1975): Betty Cantor, Bob Matthews, Bill Wolf
- Engineering (1990): Allen Sudduth, John Cutler, Peter Norman
- Computer composition software (1975): Ned Lagin
- Computer interface and polyphonic keyboard software (1975): Scott Wedge
- Cover artwork (1975, 1990): Ruth Poland
- Photography (1990): Sal Busalacchi, Ned Lagin
