= Ned Lagin =

American artist, photographer, scientist, composer, and keyboardist

- Born: March 17, 1948 (age 78)
- Origin: Roslyn Heights, New York, United States
- Genres: Electronic; avant-garde; space music; jazz; classical
- Occupations: Musician; artist; photographer; scientist; composer
- Instruments: Keyboards; percussion
- Years active: 1970–present
- Labels: Round; United Artists; Rykodisc
- Formerly of: Grateful Dead; Jerry Garcia and Friends; Seastones; Ned Lagin and Phil Lesh
- Website: Spiritcats.com

Ned Lagin (born March 17, 1948) is an American artist, photographer, scientist, composer, and keyboardist.

Lagin is considered a pioneer in the development and use of minicomputers and personal computers in real-time stage and studio music composition and performance.

He is known for his electronic music composition Seastones, for performing with the Grateful Dead, and for his photography and art.

== Early years ==
Ned Lagin was born in New York City and raised on Long Island in Roslyn Heights, New York. Growing up, Lagin was influenced by classical and jazz music, and the modern music and art cultures of New York City in the 1960s. He started photography with a Kodak Baby Brownie Special at the age of five, and piano lessons and science, natural history, and electronic projects at the age of six.

He attended the Wheatley School in Old Westbury, New York, was awarded two National Science Foundation Scholarships, and attended the Massachusetts Institute of Technology with the intention of becoming an astronaut. Lagin received a degree in molecular biology and humanities from MIT in 1971, where he studied with John Harbison, Gregory Tucker, David Epstein, Noam Chomsky, Gian-Carlo Rota, Salvador Luria, and Jerome Lettvin. Chomsky's generative grammar concepts inspired Lagin's thinking about creating generative music forms (1968), and Lettvin connected him to the writings of Norbert Wiener and Warren McCulloch, and more generally to cybernetics.

While at MIT, Lagin also completed jazz coursework at the Berklee School of Music. He was deeply influenced by the jazz world in New York City, particularly pianist Bill Evans, whom he met in Boston and saw perform many times in New York and Boston in the late 1960s and early 1970s. After becoming acquainted with each other, Evans wrote out some of his tunes for Lagin. During this period, his piano teachers included Dean Earl (a former Charlie Parker sideman) and Ray Santisi (a sideman with Parker, Stan Getz and Dexter Gordon). He also studied jazz improvisation with saxophonist Lee Konitz. Throughout his studies, Lagin played piano in the MIT Concert Jazz Band and the MIT Jazz Quintet; both groups were led by Herb Pomeroy, a former sideman with Duke Ellington and Stan Getz.

In the autumn of 1971, Lagin began graduate study in composition as an Irving Fine Fellow at Brandeis University, where he studied with Josh Rifkin and Seymour Shifrin. He completed a symphony, a string quartet, jazz big band pieces, and electronic pieces before dropping out and permanently relocating to Marin County in the Bay Area.

== Performing with the Grateful Dead ==
In early 1970, Lagin initiated a correspondence with Jerry Garcia after seeing the Grateful Dead at the Boston Tea Party in 1969. In May 1970, he helped facilitate a concert and free live outdoor performance featuring the band at MIT that coincided with the Kent State shootings. That summer, Lagin, at Garcia's invitation, visited San Francisco and contributed piano to "Candyman" during the American Beauty album sessions, played in several jams, and started what would become close friendships with Garcia, bassist Phil Lesh, and David Crosby.

From 1970 to 1975, Lagin contributed Hammond B3 organ, electric piano, and clavichord to material of his choice (primarily—but not exclusively—songs with long instrumental passages) at several Grateful Dead concerts. His first performances with the Grateful Dead were on November 5 and November 8, 1970 at the Capitol Theater in Port Chester, New York; his first complete concert was at Boston University's Sargent Gym on November 21, 1970.

During many 1974 Grateful Dead concerts over several tours, including Europe, he performed a middle set of electronic music, including parts of his composition Seastones, on computer-controlled analog synthesizers with Phil Lesh on electronically processed bass. Some sets included Jerry Garcia playing guitar filtered through effects processors and Bill Kreutzmann on drums; these sets occasionally segued into the final Grateful Dead set, with Lagin performing with the Dead, including an appearance in The Grateful Dead Movie.

During the 1974 tours, he played through the quadraphonic vocal system of the Wall of Sound PA, with 9600 watts routed through more than two hundred speakers.

The March 17, 1975 cancelled Grateful Dead studio session became a Seastones session with Crosby and included "Ned's Birthday Jam."

Lagin and Lesh's 1974 interstitial performances are included in these live Grateful Dead albums:

- Dick's Picks Volume 12
- Dave's Picks Volume 17
- Dave's Picks Volume 34
- 30 Trips Around The Sun: The Definitive Story (1965-1995)

== Seastones ==
In 1975 Lagin released Seastones, a quadraphonic album of electronic music (composed between 1970–1974 and constituting a small part of the complete Seastones composition) on Round Records and then United Artists Records.

A new, two CD album of Seastones was released on March 8, 2018. This album, not a re-issue, presents most but not all of the composition as originally composed but never released or heard before. For this release, Seastones was re-mixed and re-mastered in stereo. It includes most of the original 1970–1974 studio forms, those parts of Lagin's concurrent but unfinished composition L that are shared with Seastones, as well as some of the moment forms generated and incorporated into the composition from live performances that took place from 1973 to 1975. This two CD album contains 83 tracks (54 tracks on CD One and 29 tracks on CD Two) and altogether is 111 minutes long.

== Science career ==
During his professional career in science and engineering R&D (1976–2011) he worked on the earliest home computing technology with an Altair 8800; was a pre-release Apple Macintosh software seed developer; developed real time digital video and image processing systems; biotechnology and immunology instrumentation; DNA, RNA, and peptide synthesis and sequencing hardware and artificial intelligence software; early wireless network routing systems; and consulted in ecological planning, design and habitat restoration, including aerial and ecological photography for environmental studies.

== Photography and Art ==
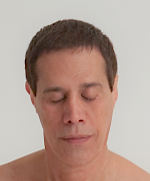
Self Portrait

Since 1978, Lagin's primary life and creativity has been in photography and art.

Lagin began photography in 1953, at the age of five, starting with a Baby Brownie camera. With that camera he made his first photographs at the Bronx Zoo of animals sadly in bare cages, photographs which his mother had developed and printed, and he then put together in his first "book". From childhood, and continuing through to the beginning of college, photography, "picture-making", and "picturing" was part of being an amateur naturalist and scientist and grew from his love and fascination with nature, with natural history drawings, maps, and electronic and scientific drawings and schematics. Growing up near New York City in the 1950's and 1960's, Lagin spent a great amount of time looking at dioramas, pictures, exhibits, displays, reconstructions, models, and galleries at the American Museum of Natural History, the Metropolitan Museum of Art, the Museum of Modern Art, and other museums and art galleries.

The wide range of photography and art influences and inspirations for Lagin include Ansel Adams, Elliot Porter, Walker Evans, Edward Weston, the natural history books by Rachel Carson, Life magazine and The World We Live In, and National Geographic. as well as by the 20th century artists Juan Miro, Paul Klee and others, and the intent (but not the style) of 19th Century American landscape painters who portrayed nature as "a revelation of spiritual meaning" placing small figures (animals, humans) "in large transcendental landscapes”. Also important to Lagin has been ancient Native American rock art (petroglyphs) and European cave art "where pictures were placed and seen within nature and the natural world, not simply as representations or depictions but being part of, and kinship with, nature”.

Lagin's picture-making includes nature and other photography, sand drawings, digital and physical paintings and drawings, and photographic nudes and self-portraits. His photography and art media span what he calls "the natural history of picture world"; his sand drawings using the earliest (oldest) picture-making medium (technology), and his digital photography, painting and electronic online picture presence the latest (newest) picture-making media (technologies). Most of Lagin's photography is of wilderness landscapes and seascapes, and 'intimate landscapes' of rocks and sea stones, plants, grasses, flowers, meadows, trees and forests, streams, water, sand, clouds and skies. His photos, drawings, and paintings are mostly from/of nearby wild places and home (Marin County, California). Besides many single photographs and small sets, he has created two large continuing nature photography collections, both with philosophical and spiritual themes: metaphysics (nature photos and sand drawings), and seeings (intimate nature).

Beginning in 1979 Lagin has drawn and photographed many hundreds of abstract, symbolic, representational, and schematic sand drawings; all drawn by him on smooth beach sand during early morning low tides using small sticks from plants grown in his garden with seeds collected from wild places he earlier photographed. For him inscribing his 'seeing' in the sand, as part of the earth and the world, expresses the fundamental natural presence of symbols in nature and the 'grounded-ness' of symbolic feeling and meaning." Lagin's drawings, both representational and abstract, include elemental symbols, imaginary creatures and "biomorphic and geomorphic life forms and their spiritual metaphysical ecologies", personal life scenes and maps, and symbols and visual metaphors derived from natural history, geography, geology, mathematics, electricity and electronic circuitry, physics, optics, chemistry, and from his imagination.

Lagin's first oil and acrylic paintings on canvas were done between 1967 and 1970. He did no paintings between 1970 and 1982 while doing music, and all of his early physical paintings were either given away or lost in the 1982 flood in Marin County, California. In 1992 Lagin started digital (electronic) painting and drawing while resuming oil and acrylic painting and drawing on canvas, and art and sand papers. His paintings and drawings, with various forms of representation and abstraction, are of nearby seascapes, landscapes, 'desertscapes', 'homescapes', and 'creatures'.

Additionally, Lagin has written (1967 to present) a large collection of texts titled Photo/Art Notes about nature and art, photography, metaphysics, the lives of pictures, the natural history of picture world, sand drawing, creatures, enchantment, kind-ness, seeing and being seen, beauty, self-portraits, creativity, imagination, the universe, and more.

From his When You Look At A Picture:

when you look at a picture
the picture looks at you

From his Art:

art is nature
spirit animating form
a way of being present
personal
individual
creature to creature
timeless and timefull

From his The Universe Knows:

the universe knows

== Cat Dreams ==
Completed in 2016, Cat Dreams is Ned Lagin's first music CD, and first public music, since 1975. Cat Dreams is formally a suite of composed pieces, and composed melodic, tonal, and rhythmic frameworks for improvisation. These are presented as solo, duo, small group, and band; acoustic, electric, electronic music. Originally composed and planned for a two CD release, Cat Dreams is the first of the two CDs that comprise the full suite of compositions.

On Cat Dreams, Lagin plays electric piano, keyboard synths (including vocals, cello, acoustic guitar, electric guitar, pedal steel guitar, banjo, and others), Native American flutes, and softsynths: Ableton Live and Max for Live, Reason, Reaktor

The other musicians performing on Cat Dreams:

- Barry Finnerty – electric guitar
- Dewayne Pate – electric bass
- Barry Sless – pedal steel guitar
- Alex Maldonado – Native American flute
- Celso Alberti – drums, percussion
- Kevin Hayes – drums
- Gary Vogensen – electric guitar
- Dick Bright – violin

== Community and environment ==
Lagin has served in Novato, California and Marin County government: Planning Commission, Downtown Plan Committee Chairperson, Economic Development Commission, Tree Task Force, Marin Conservation League Board of Directors, Marin County Flood Control Advisory Board, and chairperson for the Warner Creek Committee.
