= The Very Best of Grateful Dead =

Greatest hits album by Grateful Dead
- Released: September 16, 2003
- Recorded: Various
- Genre: Rock
- Length: 77:05
- Language: English
- Label: Warner Bros./Rhino Records
- Producers: James Austin; David Lemieux

Grateful Dead chronology
Dick's Picks Volume 29 (2003)	The Very Best of Grateful Dead (2003)	Dick's Picks Volume 30 (2003)

The Very Best of Grateful Dead is a single-CD compilation album chronicling all the years of the San Francisco psychedelic band the Grateful Dead. It is the first release to document every label the band recorded on: Warner Bros. Records, Grateful Dead Records/United Artists Records and Arista Records. It was released on September 16, 2003.

A songbook under the same name was released alongside this album which provides lyrics and musical tablature.

== Critical reception ==
Professional ratings
Review scores
Source	Rating
Allmusic	4.5/5 stars

On AllMusic, Stephen Thomas Erlewine said, "The Very Best of Grateful Dead marks the first attempt to do a thorough single-disc overview of the group's career, encompassing not just their classic Warner albums but also the records they cut for their own Grateful Dead/UA and Arista. As always with the Dead, it's hard to condense the band's free-ranging, freewheeling output onto one disc [..] but the 17 tracks here do present nearly all sides of the Dead while hitting their biggest songs. [..] The collection would have been better if sequenced a little more chronologically, but nevertheless it provides a first-class introduction to a band whose catalog can often seem a little unwieldy."

== Track listing ==
1. "Truckin'" (Jerry Garcia, Robert Hunter, Phil Lesh, Bob Weir) – 5:08
  - Originally released on the 1970 album American Beauty
2. "Touch of Grey" (Garcia, Hunter) – 5:50
  - Originally released on the 1987 album In the Dark
3. "Sugar Magnolia" (Hunter, Weir) – 3:19
  - Originally released on American Beauty
4. "Casey Jones" (Garcia, Hunter) – 4:28
  - Originally released on the 1970 album Workingman's Dead
5. "Uncle John's Band" (Garcia, Hunter) – 4:46
  - Originally released on Workingman's Dead
6. "Friend of the Devil" (Dawson, Garcia, Hunter) – 3:24
  - Originally released on American Beauty
7. "Franklin's Tower" (Garcia, Hunter, Bill Kreutzmann) – 4:33
  - Originally released on the 1975 album Blues for Allah
8. "Estimated Prophet" (John Perry Barlow, Weir) – 5:38
  - Originally released on the 1977 album Terrapin Station
9. "Eyes of the World" (Garcia, Hunter) – 5:20
  - Originally released on the 1973 album Wake of the Flood
10. "Box of Rain" (Hunter, Lesh) – 5:20
  - Originally released on American Beauty
11. "U.S. Blues" (Garcia, Hunter) – 4:40
  - Originally released on the 1974 album From the Mars Hotel
12. "The Golden Road (To Unlimited Devotion)" (Garcia) – 2:12
  - Originally released on the 1967 album The Grateful Dead
13. "One More Saturday Night" (Weir) – 4:50
  - Originally released on the 1972 live album Europe '72
14. "Fire on the Mountain" (Mickey Hart, Hunter) – 3:48
  - Originally released on the 1978 album Shakedown Street
15. "The Music Never Stopped" (Barlow, Weir) – 4:35
  - Originally released on Blues for Allah
16. "Hell in a Bucket" (Barlow, Weir) – 5:38
  - Originally released on In the Dark
17. "Ripple" (Garcia, Hunter) – 4:10
  - Originally released on American Beauty

== Personnel ==
Grateful Dead

- Tom Constanten – keyboards
- Jerry Garcia – guitar, pedal steel, vocals
- Donna Godchaux – vocals
- Keith Godchaux – keyboards
- Mickey Hart – drums
- Bill Kreutzmann – drums and percussion
- Phil Lesh – bass guitar
- Ron McKernan – organ on "The Golden Road (To Unlimited Devotion)" and "One More Saturday Night"
- Brent Mydland – keyboards
- Bob Weir – guitar, vocals

Additional musicians

- Jordan Amarantha – percussion on "Fire on the Mountain"
- The English Choral – on "Estimated Prophet"
- David Grisman – mandolin on "Friend of the Devil" and "Ripple"
- John Kahn – horn arrangements on "Fire on the Mountain"
- Matthew Kelly – harmonica on "Fire on the Mountain"
- David Nelson – electric guitar on "Box of Rain"
- The Martyn Ford Orchestra – on "Estimated Prophet"
- Merl Saunders – organ on "One More Saturday Night" (later studio overdubs)
- Steven Schuster – saxophone on "The Music Never Stopped"
- Tom Scott – lyricon and saxophones on "Estimated Prophet"
- Dave Torbert – bass guitar on "Box of Rain"
- Howard Wales – organ on "Truckin'"

Technical personnel

- James Austin – compilation producer
- David Lemieux – compilation producer
- Cameron Sears – album coordination
- Robin Hurley – associate producer
- Jimmy Edwards – product manager
- Joe Gastwirt – remastering
- Gary Peterson – discographical annotation
- Vanessa Atkins – editorial supervision
- Stanley Mouse – cover art, lettering
- Hugh Brown – art direction
- Linda Cobb – design
- Michael Ochs Archive – photography
- Bob Seidemann – photography
- Herb Greene – photography
- Bruce Polonsky – photography
- Fred Ordower – photography
- Hale Milgrim – project assistant
- Kevin Gore – project assistant
- Scott Pascucci – project assistant

Mark Pinkus – project assistant

- Tim Scanlin – project assistant
- Steven Chean – project assistant
- Dennis McNally – project assistant
- Jeffrey Norman – project assistant

== Charts ==
Album - Billboard

Year	Chart	Position
2003	The Billboard 200	69

- The album debuted on the Billboard 200 album chart on October 4, 2003. It spent 4 weeks on the chart.
