= One from the Vault =

Live album by Grateful Dead
- Released: April 15, 1991
- Recorded: August 13, 1975
- Venue: Great American Music Hall in San Francisco, California
- Genres: Jam rock; jazz-rock; progressive rock; psychedelic rock
- Length: 121:51
- Label: Grateful Dead
- Producer: Dan Healy

Grateful Dead chronology
Without a Net (1990)	One from the Vault (1991)	Infrared Roses (1991)

Professional ratings
Review scores
Source	Rating
AllMusic	3/5 stars
Rolling Stone	4/5 stars

One from the Vault is a live album by the Grateful Dead, recorded on August 13, 1975, at the Great American Music Hall in San Francisco, California, for a small audience of radio programmers. Three weeks later, the concert was broadcast nationwide on FM radio through Metromedia, after which the radio show was widely traded by fans on cassettes, and sold in bootleg LP versions under various titles including Make Believe Ballroom, becoming the most widely circulated Grateful Dead bootleg.

The concert marked the first time that the album Blues for Allah was performed live in its entirety, along with eight other songs. Retrospectively, Rolling Stone magazine lists the concert as one of 20 "essential" live concerts by the Grateful Dead.

A high quality version of the concert was released on April 15, 1991, on Grateful Dead Records, presented on two CDs. It was the first complete concert recording released commercially by the band. A remastered three-LP vinyl version was released in 2013.

== Background ==
In 1974 and 1975, Grateful Dead lead guitarist Jerry Garcia played a dozen times at Great American Music Hall (GAMH) with Merl Saunders. The venue held 400 patrons, and was much smaller than the arenas or stadia at which the Grateful Dead usually appeared. In August 1975, the Dead had just finished recording the album Blues for Allah when they decided to perform it for a select audience in a live setting, a month before the LP was to be released. To promote the album, the band rented GAMH, and issued private invitations to radio industry people who were attending the Radio Programmers Forum, a convention hosted in San Francisco by Billboard magazine. This was only the third time the band had played in public in the previous nine months.

== Production ==
A day ahead of the concert, the band's audio engineer Dan Healy hired a powerful sound system from McCune Sound Services to augment the house sound. Outside of GAMH, Wally Heider parked his remote recording truck, and prepared 16-track professional tape recorders to capture the music. As the band was setting up on stage for soundcheck on August 12, percussionist Mickey Hart requested that the chirping of live crickets should be heard during the final song. The only place where such a quiet sound could be separated from the band's loud performance was in the basement, so a box of live crickets was carried down, and a microphone cable was run down to the basement, the microphone poking through a hole in the box. These crickets were not chirping in time with the song's tempo, so a light bulb was brought near to warm them. Between the soundcheck and the show, a number of crickets escaped through the hole, and their chirping was heard throughout GAMH for some time afterward.

Rock promoter Bill Graham, who was not involved in planning this event, heard about it through industry contacts, and showed up to see if he could take part. Graham made a bet with the band's manager Ron Rakow over who would introduce the band, determined by flipping a coin. Rakow lost several flips in a row, and Graham told the audience he was not only introducing the band, but that he was getting paid $50 for the privilege. This part of the introduction was heard on the FM radio broadcast, but it was edited out for the 1991 CD release.

The 16-track tapes languished in storage for 15 years. In December 1990, they were transferred to digital audio through a PCM adaptor made by Sony, with audio filters by Apogee Electronics. In January 1991, the audio files were loaded into a Sonic Solutions digital audio workstation to edit them for compact disc release. The setlist was re-arranged to accommodate the available time per disc, moving the intermission from after "King Solomon's Marbles" to after "Around and Around".

The album was remastered for vinyl in 2013 by Joe Gastwirt, and released as three LPs.

== Radio broadcast and bootlegs ==
Three weeks after the show, a partial recording of the concert was broadcast on FM radio over the Metromedia Radio Network, heard across the United States. This broadcast did not contain the final 21-minute suite of "Blues for Allah". Many Deadheads, the band's fan base, recorded this broadcast to cassette, and such cassette copies were heavily traded among fans. Based on the FM broadcast, a 2-disc bootleg vinyl album was released in 1975 by The Amazing Kornyfone Record Label (TAKRL) and again in 1979 by Beacon Island Records, both under the title Make Believe Ballroom. Other bootleg titles of the same concert include Hot as Hell released in Japan in 1975 by White Knight Records, and Franklin's Tower published in Europe in 1990 by Flashback World Productions on both CD and LP. Make Believe Ballroom is probably the most widely traded bootleg of any Grateful Dead concert.

== Track listing ==
Disc one
First set:

1. Introduction by Bill Graham – 0:46 →
2. "Help on the Way" / "Slipknot!" (Jerry Garcia, Robert Hunter / Garcia, Keith Godchaux, Bill Kreutzmann, Phil Lesh, Bob Weir) – 7:52 →
3. "Franklin's Tower" (Garcia, Kreutzmann, Hunter) – 6:58
4. "The Music Never Stopped" (Weir, John Perry Barlow) – 5:29
5. "It Must Have Been the Roses" (Hunter) – 5:05
6. "Eyes of the World" / "Drums" (Garcia, Hunter) – 14:32 →
7. "King Solomon's Marbles" (Lesh) – 6:36
  - "Stronger Than Dirt (or, Milkin' the Turkey)" (Kreutzmann, Mickey Hart, Lesh)

Second set:

8. "Around and Around" (Chuck Berry) – 5:59

Disc two
Second set, continued:

1. "Sugaree" (Garcia, Hunter) – 7:56
2. "Big River" (Johnny Cash) – 4:50
3. "Crazy Fingers" / "Drums" (Garcia, Hunter) – 13:08 →
4. "The Other One" (Weir, Kreutzmann) – 5:33 →
5. "Sage and Spirit" (Weir) – 3:24 →
6. "Goin' Down the Road Feeling Bad" (traditional, arranged by Grateful Dead) – 7:13
7. "U.S. Blues" (Garcia, Hunter) – 5:29
8. "Blues for Allah" (Garcia, Hunter) – 21:01
  - "Sand Castles & Glass Camels" (Garcia, Donna Godchaux, K. Godchaux, Hart, Kreutzmann, Lesh, Weir)
  - "Unusual Occurrences in the Desert" (Garcia, Hunter)

Note: When the album was produced, the set break was moved from after "King Solomon's Marbles" to after "Around and Around", to occur at the end of the first disc. Bob Weir is heard to say, "We're gonna take a short break, we'll be back in just a few minutes, so everybody hang loose".

== Personnel ==
- Jerry Garcia – guitar, vocals
- Bob Weir – guitar, vocals
- Keith Godchaux – keyboards, vocals
- Donna Jean Godchaux – vocals
- Phil Lesh – bass guitar, vocals
- Bill Kreutzmann – drums and percussion
- Mickey Hart – percussion and crickets

== Charts ==
Chart (1991)	Peak position
US Billboard 200	106

== See also ==
- Grateful Dead: Backstage Pass documentary film
