= Crazy Fingers =

Song by Grateful Dead

from the album Blues for Allah
- Released: September 1, 1975
- Length: 6:41
- Label: Grateful Dead
- Composer: Robert Hunter
- Lyricist: Jerry Garcia
- Producer: Grateful Dead

"Crazy Fingers" is a song by the American rock band Grateful Dead, released as the seventh track on their eighth studio album Blues for Allah (1975).

== Overview ==
Grateful Dead lyricist Robert Hunter incorporated haikus into "Crazy Fingers" and made it into a reggae ballad, although Jerry Garcia told Blair Jackson that the original version of the song had a heavy metal style to it, but that it got its final musical style when it was brought into their concert setlists. The track was a product of the band's extended woodshedding in Bob Weir's home studio. The song's title is a reference the nickname of Claude Hopkins, an American jazz pianist. According to Deadbase X, the first performance of the song was on June 17, 1975. The song wasn't a regular in the Dead's setlists until 1982.

== Release and reception ==
"Crazy Fingers" was released on Blues for Allah (1975). In a ranking of the Dead's 100 best songs, it was placed it at number 77, with Benjy Eisen believing it to be "an elusive entry into the Dead canon that earns its spot more on feel and suggestion than on jams or meaning." adding that "The song is a confluence of classic Grateful Dead elements from that time period, where seemingly disparate sections are delicately woven together under a storyline absent a narrative. The ambiguity has led many a Deadhead to feel like the song is relatable, even if they couldn’t articulate what it’s about, exactly." Writing for AllMusic, Lindsay Planer noted that "Although brief by Grateful Dead standards, the instrumental interludes allow Garcia to unravel a pair of slightly extended lead guitar solos that gently wind and dance within the central melody." commenting that "The backing vocal support from Bob Weir (guitar/vocals) and Donna Jean Godchaux (vocals) is nothing short of sublime as they effortlessly weave their harmonies beneath Garcia’s affective lead." In a review of the 50th anniversary reissue of Blues for Allah, Hays Davis of Under the Radar wrote that it has "A reggae lilt [that ]drives [it]" Live versions of the track have appeared on the following Dead live albums:

- One from the Vault (1991, recorded on August 13, 1975)
- Dick's Picks Volume 17 (2000, recorded on September 25, 1991)
- Grateful Dead Download Series Volume 4 (2005, recorded on June 18, 1976)
- Grateful Dead Download Series Volume 9 disc two (2006, recorded on April 3, 1986)
- Spirit of '76 (Live at the Cow Palace bonus disc) (2007, recorded on June 9, 1976)
- Spring 1990 (The Other One) (2014, recorded on March 14, 1990)
- 30 Trips Around the Sun (2015, recorded on October 27, 1990)
- Giants Stadium 1987, 1989, 1991 (2019, recorded on June 16, 1991)
- June 1976 (2020, recorded on June 14, 1976)
- In and Out of the Garden: Madison Square Garden '81, '82, '83 (2022, recorded on September 21, 1982)
- Dave's Picks Volume 44 (2022, recorded on June 23, 1990)
- Dave's Picks Volume 49 disc four (2024, recorded on April 28, 1985)
- Beacon Theatre, New York, NY 6/14/76 (2025, recorded on June 14, 1976)
- Enjoying the Ride (2025, recorded on various dates)
- Summer Magic 1985 (2026, recorded on June 27, 1985)

A soundcheck performance of the song, recorded on the day of the concert released on the One from the Vault live album was released on the 50th anniversary edition of Blues for Allah.
