= Grateful Dead: Backstage Pass =

Backstage Pass
- Backstage Pass video tape cover
- Directed by: Justin Kreutzmann
- Produced by: Gillian Grisman
- Starring: Grateful Dead
- Edited by: Bill Weber; Justin Kreutzmann
- Distributed by: Grateful Dead Productions
- Release date: 1992
- Running time: 35 minutes
- Country: United States
- Language: English

Backstage Pass is a music documentary video by the Grateful Dead. It was directed by Justin Kreutzmann, son of Grateful Dead drummer Bill Kreutzmann, and produced by Gillian Grisman, daughter of musician David Grisman. It was released in 1992, and is 35 minutes long.

== Segments of the video ==
As the name implies, Backstage Pass provides a behind-the-scenes look at the Grateful Dead. Excepting the intro section, each of its segments has a Dead song performance as its soundtrack. The visuals are a mixture of footage of the band from all eras up to the time the video was made, combined with footage of the song performances themselves, along with some computer animation.

1. "Intro", sights and sounds from outside the concert venues, using the Infrared Roses track "Crowd Sculpture".
2. "Hard to Handle", sung by Pigpen, using audio from an April 29, 1971 concert (later released as part of Ladies and Gentlemen...). The visuals are a montage of onstage and offstage footage of the Grateful Dead from all eras, focusing on the early days of the band.
3. "Fearless Groove", a studio version of "Drums" performed by Mickey Hart and Bill Kreutzmann, combined with footage of the Dead from all eras.
4. "The Other One", using visuals from the band's visit to Egypt and performance at the Great Sphinx of Giza (see also Rocking the Cradle: Egypt 1978). The audio, cross-fading from the previous segment, uses "Blues for Allah", followed by "The Other One", both from a concert performance on August 13, 1975 in San Francisco (see also One from the Vault).
5. "Easy to Love You", a concert performance of the song written and sung by Brent Mydland, combined with footage of the Dead, most of it then relatively recent. The video of Brent performing is from July 6, 1990, in Louisville, Kentucky (see also View from the Vault, Volume One), while the audio is from March 22, 1990 at Copps Coliseum in Hamilton, Ontario (see also Spring 1990 (the other one)).
6. "She Belongs to Me", a studio version performed by Jerry Garcia, Bob Weir, and Phil Lesh. Garcia and Weir play acoustic guitars and trade off singing verses of the song. The visuals consist entirely of the song performance and are in black-and-white.
7. "Infrared Roses Revisited", a concert performance of the free-form improvisational song "Space". This version is the track called "Magnesium Night Light" from the album Infrared Roses, recorded October 9, 1989 in Hampton, Virginia (see also Formerly the Warlocks). The visuals are a computer animation of abstract forms and Grateful Dead related imagery (see also Infrared Sightings).
8. "Outro", credits with music from a "Scarlet Begonias>Fire on the Mountain" segue recorded in concert October 31, 1990, in London, England.

== Track listing ==
- "Hard to Handle" (Jones, Isbell, Redding)
- "Fearless Groove" (Hart, Kreutzmann)
- "The Other One" (Weir, Kreutzmann)
- "Easy to Love You" (Mydland)
- "She Belongs to Me" (Dylan)
- "Infrared Roses Revisited" (Garcia, Hart, Healy, Kreutzmann, Lesh, Mydland, Weir, Bralove)

== Credits ==
=== Grateful Dead ===
- Jerry Garcia
- Mickey Hart
- Bill Kreutzmann
- Phil Lesh
- Bob Weir
- Vince Welnick
- Ron "Pigpen" McKernan
- Keith Godchaux
- Donna Godchaux
- Brent Mydland
- Tom Constanten
- Bruce Hornsby

=== Production ===
- Justin Kreutzmann – director
- Gillian Grisman – producer
- John Cutler – music producer
- Bob Bralove – sound designer
- Xaos – animation
- Bill Weber, Justin Kreutzmann – editors
- Fine Line Design – package design
- Annette Flowers – special thanks
