= Franklin's Tower (song) =

- 2019 single reissue cover

Single by Grateful Dead

from the album Blues for Allah
- B-side: "Help on the Way"
- Released: January 1976
- Length: 4:32
- Label: Grateful Dead; United Artists
- Composers: Jerry Garcia; Bill Kreutzmann
- Lyricist: Robert Hunter
- Producer: Grateful Dead

Grateful Dead singles chronology
"The Music Never Stopped" (1975)	"Franklin's Tower" (1976)	"Dancin' in the Streets" (1977)

"Franklin's Tower" (sometimes subtitled "Roll Away the Dew") is a song by the American rock band the Grateful Dead, written by Jerry Garcia, Bill Kreutzmann, and Robert Hunter, released as the second single from the band's eighth studio album Blues for Allah (1975) in January 1976.

== Background and composition ==
Taking inspiration from Lou Reed's hit "Walk on the WIld Side", Robert Hunter had intended the song to be a lullabye birthday wish for his son. The track is shrouded in unusual, yet symbolic imagery, as Grateful Dead biographer David Gans wrote in his book The American Book of the Dead: "The song paints landscapes and offers timescapes where the four winds blow around a structure that contains a bell with magical properties so powerful that an unnamed brand of salvation may be obtained by its ringing." According to Hunter, the lyrics contain references to Benjamin Franklin and the Liberty Bell.

== Release and reception ==
In a Cashbox magazine review, the writers note that "The Dead have always been masters of ensemble playing, [as] Garcia sings the tune carefully, concentrating on phrasing and revealing nuance." Record World writes that "Th[is] veteran west coast ensemble's tasty compote of bubbly guitar work and breezy vocals should succeed in crossing AM boundaries with this easy-going track." Matt Mitchell placed it at number 13 in his ranking of their 20 best songs, stating that "It’s such a special track from start to finish, and it’s a quintessential post-hiatus offering from the Dead that should never be overlooked."

The track's first compilation release was the 2003 compilation The Very Best of Grateful Dead. The track has been released on many Grateful Dead live releases which include various Dick's Picks releases and multiple live performances on the set Enjoying the Ride (2025). During concerts, the song was frequently played as the finale of a three-part suite also containing "Help on the Way" and "Slipknot!", which precede it on Blues for Allah. The single release features "Help on the Way" as a b-side.

The Allman Brothers Band occasionally covered the song live, as seen on recordings such as The Fox Box.

== Personnel ==
According to the Grateful Dead Family Discography:

Performers

- Jerry Garcia – guitar, vocals
- Keith Godchaux – keyboards, vocals
- Donna Godchaux – vocals
- Mickey Hart – percussion, crickets
- Bill Kreutzmann – drums, percussion
- Phil Lesh – bass, vocals
- Bob Weir – guitar, vocals

Guest musician

- Steven Schuster – reeds, flute

Production

- Producer – Grateful Dead
- Engineer – Dan Healy
- Assistant engineer – Rob Taylor
- Mixing – Grateful Dead, Dan Healy
- Production assistants – Ramrod, Steve Brown, Betty Cantor, Bob Matthews, Brett Cohen
- Recorded at Ace's
