= Infrared Roses =

Live album by Grateful Dead
- Released: November 1, 1991
- Recorded: 1989–1990
- Genre: Improvisational rock
- Length: 58:18
- Label: Grateful Dead
- Producer: Bob Bralove

Grateful Dead chronology
One from the Vault (1991)	Infrared Roses (1991)	Two from the Vault (1992)

Infrared Roses is a live album by American rock band the Grateful Dead. It was released on November 1, 1991, through Grateful Dead Records. The album is a compilation of excerpts from the improvisational "Drums" and "Space" segments of the band's concerts, edited by sound technician Bob Bralove into twelve separate pieces. The packaging features digital art created by the band's guitarist Jerry Garcia, while the song titles were devised by lyricist Robert Hunter. Music from Infrared Roses was used as the soundtrack for the 18-minute Grateful Dead video Infrared Sightings.

While attracting few critical reviews upon release, Infrared Roses did receive a mixed-to-positive reception, with publications praising the record for its experimental nature. Though it failed to crack the US Billboard 200, it reached number 124 on the Cash Box Top 200 Pop Albums chart. Infrared Roses would become the band's last contemporary live album and release of new original material before Garcia's death and the band's dissolution in 1995.

== Overview ==
The music on Infrared Roses is primarily taken from the improvisational "Drums" and "Space" segments which were a mainstay in the second sets of the band's shows. "Crowd Sculpture" is a sound collage made of recordings of the crowd outside of a Grateful Dead concert. This segues into "Parallelogram", a percussion-based track. Other tracks taken from "Drums" segments are "Post-Modern Highrise Table Top Stomp" (featuring guest Willie Green III) and "River of Nine Sorrows", which DownBeat characterizes by their "acoustic and electric percussions [which] are enhanced by Bralove and [soundman] Dan Healy's hyper-real sonic imagery", and "Speaking in Swords", which centers on Mickey Hart's use of his "Beam" instrument. DownBeat describes the rest of the album's material as "guitar and keyboard arcs and abstractions".

Some tracks, such as "Little Nemo and Nightland" and "Silver Apples of the Moon", are composites of performances from multiple shows. "Riverside Rhapsody" is an excerpt of a transitional jam in between "Uncle John's Band" and "Drums". "Sparrow Hawk Row" is centered around tapes of the band playing which have been processed by Healy. The track has been described by REP as "like what you might expect to hear in Ten-Forward, the cocktail lounge on the Starship Enterprise." The magazine further describes "Magnesium Night Light" as "soundtrack music for Terminator III." The album's closing track, "Apollo at the Ritz", features contributions from guest saxophonist Branford Marsalis.

== Reception ==
Professional ratings
Review scores
Source	Rating
AllMusic	2/5 stars
DownBeat	3.5/5 stars
The Encyclopedia of Popular Music	2/5 stars
Entertainment Weekly	C+

Infrared Roses has received mixed-to-positive reviews from critics. REP praised the album for "cover[ing] a great deal of musical territory", summarizing it as "great stuff, on anyone's scale, [which] defies description or pigeonholing." Jon Andrews of DownBeat noted that "you don't have to be a Deadhead to appreciate" the record, highlighting the percussion-centric pieces as its "most powerful" music, while also praising Garcia's playing for "pull[ing] everything together." Andrews opined that while "Bralove's ambitious production lacks context, and risks losing direction and coherence", the album ultimately "is faithful to the Dead's restless spirit." Writing for Stereophile, Richard Lenhert called the record "almost consistently interesting", stating that while "a few sections sound aimless", the rest are "more musically adventurous than anything I've ever heard from the Dead". Lenhert picked "Apollo at the Ritz" as a highlight, due to Branford Marsalis' playing and the band's "lively hard-bop changes".

Conversely, in an overview of the band's entire catalogue, Entertainment Weekly gave Infrared Roses a C+ rating, considering the music to be "the Dead at their most far out". In a retrospective review for AllMusic, Lindsay Planer gave the album two stars out of five, warning listeners that the record "isn't a typical live Grateful Dead recording and potential consumers should not expect such." However, he also stated it contains "plenty for the adventurous listener, Deadheads longing for a good ol' 'Drums/Space' freak-out, and even parties curious about the remarkable stylistic breadth that became a motif of the Grateful Dead's concerts for three decades."

== Track listing ==
I.
No.	Title	Writer(s)	Length
1.	"Crowd Sculpture"	Bob Bralove	2:21
2.	"Parallelogram"	Mickey Hart; Bill Kreutzmann	5:06
3.	"Little Nemo in Nightland"	Jerry Garcia; Phil Lesh; Bob Weir; Bralove	6:16

II.
No.	Title	Writer(s)	Length
4.	"Riverside Rhapsody"	Garcia; Hart; Kreutzmann; Lesh; Brent Mydland; Weir	3:55
5.	"Post-Modern Highrise Table Top Stomp"	Garcia; Willie Green III; Hart; Kreutzmann; Lesh; Mydland; Weir	4:23
6.	"Infrared Roses"	Garcia; Lesh; Mydland; Weir; Bralove	5:36

III.
No.	Title	Writer(s)	Length
7.	"Silver Apples of the Moon"	Bruce Hornsby; Vince Welnick	5:41
8.	"Speaking in Swords"	Hart; Kreutzmann; Bralove	3:29
9.	"Magnesium Night Light"	Garcia; Lesh; Mydland; Weir	5:28

IV.
No.	Title	Writer(s)	Length
10.	"Sparrow Hawk Row"	Garcia; Hart; Dan Healy; Kreutzmann; Lesh; Mydland; Weir; Bralove	3:23
11.	"River of Nine Sorrows"	Hart; Kreutzmann; Bralove	4:25
12.	"Apollo at the Ritz"	Garcia; Hart; Kreutzmann; Lesh; Branford Marsalis; Mydland; Weir	8:15
Total length:			58:18

== Personnel ==
Musicians listed in order of appearance on each track.

"Crowd Sculpture"

- Deadheads

"Parallelogram"

- Bill Kreutzmann - Trap Drums Left, Mickey Hart - Trap Drums Right
- Mickey Hart - Beast (Large Drums) and Beam
- Bill Kreutzmann - Timbales

"Little Nemo in Nightland"

- Bob Weir - Guitar
- Jerry Garcia - Guitar
- Phil Lesh - Bass

"Riverside Rhapsody"

- Jerry Garcia - Guitar
- Bob Weir - Guitar
- Phil Lesh - Bass
- Brent Mydland - Keyboards
- Bill Kreutzmann - Drums
- Mickey Hart - Drums and Electronic Percussion

"Post-Modern Highrise Table Top Stomp"

- Stereo Left ← Stereo Center ↓ Stereo Right→
- Willie Green III - Kick Snare Hat ↓
- Bill Kreutzmann - Roto Toms ←
- Mickey Hart - Talking Drums →
- Jerry Garcia - Electronic Percussion (Cow Bells, Shakers, Drums) ↓,→
- Bob Weir - Midi Guitar: Marimba ←,↓
- Phil Lesh - Bass ↓
- Brent Mydland - Midi Keyboard (Rattles, Shakers, Toms) ↓

"Infrared Roses"

- Brent Mydland - Keys and Synth ("Outerspace FX", Voices, Piano)
- Phil Lesh - Bass and Synth (Trombone, FilterSweeps, French horn, Strings, Bells)
- Bob Weir - Guitar and Synths (Bells, Glockenspiel, Vibes)
- Jerry Garcia - Guitar and Synths (Trumpet, Mandolin, Voices, Strings)

"Silver Apples of the Moon"

- Bruce Hornsby - Piano and Synths (Strings, Vibes)
- Vince Welnick - Synths (Voices, Strings, Rattles, Organ, Bells)

"Speaking in Swords"

- Mickey Hart - Beam and Electronic Percussion
- Bill Kreutzmann - Electronic Percussion

"Magnesium Night Light"

- Jerry Garcia - Guitars and Synths (Trumpet, Strings)
- Bob Weir - Guitar and Synths (Bells, Marimbas, Vibes)
- Phil Lesh - Bass and Synths (Bass Fuzz, Filter Sweep, Bells)
- Brent Mydland - Keys and Synths (FX, Piano, Electric Piano)

"Sparrow Hawk Row"

- Dan Healy - Processing
  and in no particular order
- Jerry Garcia - Guitar
- Bob Weir - Guitar
- Phil Lesh - Bass
- Brent Mydland - Keys
- Mickey Hart & Bill Kreutzmann - Drums

"River of Nine Sorrows"

- Mickey Hart - Electronic Percussion, Synths (Bird Whistles, Woodblocks, Log Drum)
- Bill Kreutzmann - Drums, Electronic Percussion, Synths (Gongs, Congas, Woodblocks, Electronic Toms)
- Bob Bralove - Drum Machine Sequencing

"Apollo at the Ritz"

- Jerry Garcia - Guitar and Synths (Church Bell, Flute, Double Reed and lots more)
- Phil Lesh - Bass and Synths (Bass Flute)
- Branford Marsalis - Tenor and Soprano Sax
- Bob Weir - Guitar and Synths (Trumpet Section)
- Brent Mydland - Keys
- Mickey Hart & Bill Kreutzmann - Drums

Production

- Produced by Bob Bralove
- Mixing engineer: Jeffrey Norman
- Multi-track recording engineer: John Cutler
- 2-track recording: Dan Healy, Bob Bralove
- Digital mastering: Joe Gastwirt
- Synthesizer programming: Bob Bralove
- Cover art: Jerry Garcia
- Art direction: Amy F.

== Charts ==
Chart performance for Infrared Roses
Chart (1992)	Peak position
US Cash Box Top 200	124
