= Rocking the Cradle: Egypt 1978 =

Live album by Grateful Dead
- Released: September 30, 2008
- Recorded: September 15–16, 1978
- Genre: Rock
- Length: CDs: 145:48; DVD: 111:49; Bonus disc: 75:32
- Label: Grateful Dead
- Producer: Grateful Dead

Grateful Dead chronology
Road Trips Volume 1 Number 3 (2008)	Rocking the Cradle: Egypt 1978 (2008)	Road Trips Volume 1 Number 4 (2008)

Professional ratings
Review scores
Source	Rating
All About Jazz	(favorable)
Allmusic	3.5/5 stars
Glide	3.5/5 stars
The Music Box	3/5 stars
Relix	(favorable)
The Best of Website	(A+)

Rocking the Cradle: Egypt 1978 is a live album by American rock band the Grateful Dead. It contains two CDs and one DVD and was released in 2008. The album was recorded September 15 and 16, 1978, at the Giza pyramid complex in Giza, Egypt. This was the third continent on which the band performed, having previously performed in Europe. The shows on the album were recorded on a 24-track multitrack recorder and were mixed down to stereo for the album's release.

A bonus disc of additional tracks from the dates was included with early copies of the album. The DVD contains concert footage (all of which is represented either on the two CDs or the bonus disc) from the September 16 performance. It also includes "The Vacation Tapes", a 15-minute feature, from footage originally shot on 8mm silent film, of band members, crew and friends visiting various Egyptian sites.

== Concert planning & performance ==
The idea for the concerts had its origins in an Egyptian vacation taken by band manager Richard Loren. Following some on-the-ground research by Trist's close friend Jonathan Wallace and his meeting with Jehan Sadat, the then-First Lady of Egypt, Loren returned with bassist Phil Lesh and Alan Trist to meet with officials and begin the paperwork and logistics process. Through Wallace's introduction to Joe Malone, a professor at the American University of Beirut who was formerly with the State Department, the trio had made contacts with the Egyptian government. Describing the planning, bassist Phil Lesh said, "It sort of became my project because I was one of the first people in the band who was on the trip of playing at places of power. You know, power that's been preserved from the ancient world. The pyramids are like the obvious number one choice because no matter what anyone thinks they might be, there is definitely some kind of mojo about the pyramids."

Rather than ship all of the required sound reinforcement equipment from the United States, the PA and a 24-track, mobile studio recording truck were borrowed from the Who, in the UK. The Dead crew set up their gear at the open-air theater on the east side of the Great Sphinx, for three nights of concerts. The final two, September 15 & 16, 1978, are excerpted for the album. The band referred to their stage set-up as "The Gizah Sound and Light Theater".

The final night's performance coincided with a total lunar eclipse. Drummer Bill Kreutzmann played with a cast, having broken his wrist while horseback riding. The King's Chamber of the nearby Great Pyramid of Giza was rigged with a speaker and microphone in a failed attempt to live-mix acoustical echo. Hamza El Din, a Nubian oudist, performed as a guest and his composition "Ollin Arageed" appears on the album. He was backed by the students of his Abu Simbel school and accompanied by the Grateful Dead. El Din also appears on the Grateful Dead album Road Trips Volume 1 Number 4.

Lesh recalled that through the shows he observed "an increasing number of shadowy figures gathering just at the edge of the illuminated area surrounding the stage and audience – not locals, as they all seem to be wearing the same garment, a dark, hooded robe. These, it turns out, are the Bedouin, the nomadic horsemen of the desert: drawn in by the music and lights... each night they have remained to dance and sway rhythmically for the duration of the show." Kreutzmann recalls "Egypt instantly became the biggest, baddest, and most legendary field trip that we took during our entire thirty years as a band... It was priceless and perfect and, at half a million dollars, a bargain in the end. Albeit, a very expensive bargain."

The concerts weren't expected to be profitable (proceeds were donated to the Department of Antiquities and a charity chosen by Jehan Sadat). Costs were to be offset by the production of a triple-live album; however, performances did not turn out as proficient as planned, musically, and technical problems plagued the recordings. The results were shelved as the band focused instead on a new studio album, Shakedown Street.

== Release ==
For the 30th anniversary of the event, producer Jeffrey Norman selected usable tracks that featured some of the better performances – chiefly from the final night of the run – for release. A different mix of the tracks "Fire on the Mountain" and "Stagger Lee" had previously appeared on the expanded edition of Shakedown Street. That release also has a different edit of Hamza El Din's performance of "Ollin Arageed". Part of the material on "The Vacation Tapes" DVD previously appeared as a video segment on the music documentary Backstage Pass.

The album title has a double meaning, referring to a rocking cradle and the fact that the Grateful Dead were playing rock music in one of the cradles of civilization. The cover art is by Alton Kelley and further artwork features a pop-up, created by Scott McDougall.

== Track listing ==
=== Disc one ===
1. "Jack Straw" (Robert Hunter, Bob Weir) – 6:44
2. "Row Jimmy" (Hunter, Jerry Garcia) – 11:46
3. "New Minglewood Blues" (Noah Lewis) – 6:26
4. "Candyman" (Hunter, Garcia) – 7:29
5. "Looks Like Rain" (John Barlow, Weir) – 8:52
6. "Stagger Lee" (Hunter, Garcia) – 7:30 (Note: Previously released as a bonus track on Shakedown Street)
7. "I Need a Miracle" > (Barlow, Weir) – 5:45
8. "It's All Over Now" (Bobby Womack, Shirley Womack) – 7:40
9. "Deal" (Hunter, Garcia) – 7:04

=== Disc two ===
1. "Ollin Arageed" > (Hamza El Din) – 6:56 (Note: Performed by Hamza El Din, both solo and backed by the Grateful Dead) (Note: Edited version of performance) (Note: Previously released as a bonus track on Shakedown Street)
2. "Fire on the Mountain" > (Hunter, Mickey Hart) – 14:06
3. "Iko Iko" (James "Sugar Boy" Crawford) – 7:03
4. "Shakedown Street" > (Hunter, Garcia) – 15:31
5. "Drums" > (Hart, Bill Kreutzmann) – 3:31
6. "Space" > (Garcia, Keith Godchaux, Phil Lesh, Weir) – 2:26
7. "Truckin' " > (Hunter, Garcia, Lesh, Weir) – 10:14
8. "Stella Blue" > (Hunter, Garcia) – 8:19
9. "Around and Around" (Chuck Berry) – 8:21

=== DVD ===
1. "Bertha" > (Hunter, Garcia) – 5:30 (Note: Excerpt of performance)
2. "Good Lovin' " (Arthur Resnick, Rudy Clark) – 7:52
3. "Row Jimmy" (Hunter, Garcia) – 11:20
4. "New Minglewood Blues" (Lewis) – 6:07
5. "Candyman" (Hunter, Garcia) – 7:08
6. "Looks Like Rain" (Barlow, Weir) – 8:33
7. "Deal" (Hunter, Garcia) – 6:52
8. "Ollin Arageed" > (El Din) – 7:49
9. "Fire on the Mountain" > (Hunter, Hart) – 9:12
10. "Iko Iko" (Crawford) – 6:04
11. "I Need a Miracle" > (Barlow, Weir) – 5:54
12. "It's All Over Now" (B. Womack, S. Womack) – 3:30
13. "Truckin' " (Hunter, Garcia, Lesh, Weir) – 9:23

=== Bonus disc ===
1. "Bertha" > (Hunter, Garcia) – 7:03 (Note: Excerpt of performance)
2. "Good Lovin' " (Resnick, Clark) – 7:55
3. "El Paso" (Marty Robbins) – 4:58
4. "Ramble on Rose" (Hunter, Garcia) – 7:51
5. "Estimated Prophet" > (Barlow, Weir) – 12:00
6. "Eyes of the World" > (Hunter, Garcia) – 13:26
7. "Terrapin Station" > (Hunter, Garcia) – 11:35
8. "Sugar Magnolia" (Hunter, Weir) – 10:42

== Recording dates ==
- Disc 1 tracks 1 & 6; Bonus disc tracks 5–8: September 15, 1978
- Disc 1 tracks 2–5, 7–9; Disc 2: tracks 1–9; Bonus disc tracks 1–4: September 16, 1978
- DVD all tracks: September 16, 1978

== Concert set lists ==
Following are the complete set lists for the Egypt concerts.

=== September 14, 1978 ===
- First set: Ollin Arageed > Not Fade Away, Me and My Uncle, They Love Each Other, New Minglewood Blues, Peggy-O, Beat It On Down the Line, Deal
- Second set: Sugaree, Samson and Delilah, Scarlet Begonias > Fire on the Mountain, Truckin' > The Other One > Drums > Space > Black Peter > Around and Around

=== September 15, 1978 ===
- First set: Ollin Arageed > Promised Land, Friend of the Devil, Mama Tried > Big River, Loser, I Need A Miracle, Stagger Lee*
- Second set: Jack Straw*, Ship Of Fools, Estimated Prophet** > Eyes Of The World** > Drums > Space > Terrapin Station** > Sugar Magnolia**

=== September 16, 1978 ===
- First set: Bertha** > Good Lovin'**, Candyman*, Looks Like Rain*, Row Jimmy*, El Paso**, Ramble On Rose**, New Minglewood Blues*, Deal*
- Second set: Ollin Arageed* > Fire On The Mountain* > Iko Iko*, I Need A Miracle* > It's All Over Now*, Sunrise, Shakedown Street* > Drums* > Space* > Truckin'* > Stella Blue* > Around and Around*
- Encore: One More Saturday Night

*Included in Rocking the Cradle: Egypt 1978

**Included in Rocking the Cradle: Egypt 1978 bonus disc

== Personnel ==
=== Grateful Dead ===
- Jerry Garcia – lead guitar, vocals
- Donna Jean Godchaux – vocals
- Keith Godchaux – keyboards
- Mickey Hart – drums
- Bill Kreutzmann – drums
- Phil Lesh – bass guitar
- Bob Weir – rhythm guitar, vocals

=== Guest musicians ===
- Hamza El Din - vocals, oud, tar, hand clapping on "Ollin Arageed"
- The Nubian Youth Choir - vocals, hand clapping, tar on "Ollin Arageed"

=== Production ===
- Concert executive producer – Richard Loren
- Concert sound – Dan Healy
- Concert video – Gary Biddle
- Sound recording – John Kahn, Betty Cantor-Jackson, Bob Matthews
- PA system and recording equipment provided by The Who
- Lighting director – Candace Brightman
- Video documentary – Richard Loren
- Compilation produced by – David Lemieux
- Stereo and 5.1 mix – Jeffrey Norman at Garage Audio, Petaluma, CA
- Concert video post-production at Video Arts, San Francisco
- Concert video mastering – David Glasser at Airshow Mastering
- CD mastering – Jeffrey Norman
- Audio restoration – Jamie Howarth / Plangent Processes
- Audiovisual research – Mike Johnson
- Archival research – Eileen Law / Grateful Dead Archives
- Cover art – Kelley
- Art direction – Steve Vance, Scott Webber
- Package design – Steve Vance
- Pop-up art – Scott McDougall
- Liner notes essay "A Venue for Recollection" – Alan Trist
- Dedicated to the memory of Jerry Garcia, Keith Godchaux, John Kahn, Hamza El Din, Lawrence "Ramrod" Shurtliff, Goldie Rush, Ken Kesey, Alton Kelly, Bill Graham, Anwar Sadat, and Menachem Begin

== Charts ==
Album - Billboard

Year	Chart	Position
2008	The Billboard 200	35

== See also ==
- Backstage Pass
- Shakedown Street
