= Hamza El Din =

Nubian-Egyptian musician (1929–2006)

Hamza El Din حمزة علاء الدين
- Born: July 10, 1929; Toshka, Egypt
- Origin: Nubia
- Died: May 22, 2006 (aged 76) Berkeley, California, U.S.
- Genres: Nubian music
- Occupations: Composer, Musician, Vocalist
- Instruments: Oud, Tar (drum)
- Years active: 1960s – 2000)
- Labels: Vanguard Records, King Records, Sounds True, Water Lily Acoustics
- Website: www.hamzaeldin.com

Hamza El Din (Arabic: حمزة علاء الدين) (July 10, 1929 – May 22, 2006) was an Egyptian Nubian composer, oud player, tar player, and vocalist. He was born in southern Egypt and was an internationally known musician of his native region Nubia, situated on both sides of the Egypt–Sudan border. After musical studies in Cairo, he lived and studied in Italy, Japan and the United States. El Din collaborated with a wide variety of musical performers, including Sandy Bull, the Kronos Quartet and the Grateful Dead.

== Early life ==
Born in the village of Toshka in Southern Egypt, in the governorate of Aswan, El Din was originally trained to be an electrical engineer. Like much of Egyptian Nubia, his home village of Toshka was flooded due to the construction of the Aswan High Dam in the 1960s.

After working in Cairo for the Egyptian national railways, he changed direction and began to study music at the Cairo University, and later continued his studies at the Accademia Nazionale di Santa Cecilia in Rome. He also studied at Ibrahim Shafiq's Institute of Music and the King Fouad Institute for Middle Eastern Music, and traveled in Egypt on a government grant, collecting folksongs. El Din played the oud, the short-necked Arabian lute, as well as traditional percussion, and accompanied his compositions singing both in local Arabic and his native Nubian language.

His performances attracted the attention of the Grateful Dead, Joan Baez, and Bob Dylan in the 1960s, which led to a recording contract and to his eventual emigration to the United States. In 1963, El Din shared an apartment in the San Francisco Bay Area with folk musician Sandy Bull.

== Career ==
Following his appearance at the Newport Folk Festival in 1964, he recorded two albums for Vanguard Records, released 1964–65. His 1971 recording Escalay: The Water Wheel, published by Nonesuch Records and produced by Mickey Hart, has been recognized as one of the first world music recordings to gain wide release in the West, and was claimed as an influence by some American minimalist composers, such as Steve Reich and Terry Riley, as well as by Grateful Dead percussionist Mickey Hart. He also performed with the Grateful Dead, most famously during their Egypt concerts of 1978. In this period, he also mentored a number of musicians, including Sandy Bull and Windham Hill recording artist Scott Cossu. Later, he released albums for Lotus Records and Sounds True. In 1992, he performed with the Kronos Quartet on an arrangement of his piece Escalay on their album Pieces of Africa. His pieces were often used in ballet performances and plays.

El Din held a number of teaching positions on ethnomusicology in the United States between the 1970s until the 1990s. Some of these included Ohio University, University of Washington, and the University of Texas at Austin. In the 1980s, he moved to Japan to study the biwa in Tokyo. After that, he eventually settled down in Oakland, California. In 1999, he released his last album, A Wish, with Hani Naser.

== Death ==
El Din died on May 22, 2006, after complications following surgery for a gallbladder infection at a hospital in Berkeley, California.

== Discography ==
Albums

- 1964 – Music of Nubia (Vanguard)
- 1965 – Al Oud (Vanguard)
- 1971 – Escalay: The Water Wheel (Nonesuch)
- 1978 – Eclipse
- 1982 – A Song of the Nile
- 1990 – Journey
- 1990 – Nubiana Suite: Live in Tokyo
- 1995 – Lily of the Nile
- 1996 – Available Sound: Darius
- 1996 – Muwashshah
- 1999 – A Wish

Contributing artist

- 1965 – The Newport Folk Festival 1964 - Evening Concerts, Vol. 2 (Vanguard)
- 1987 - Robinson’s Garden, OST (1ℓ Records)
- 1997 - The Rough Guide to the Music of North Africa (World Music Network)
- 1998 - Passion in the Desert, OST (RCA Victor)
- 2006 - Babel, OST (Concord)

As sideman or guest artist

- 1964 - Spellbound, Ahmed Abdul-Malik (Status)
- 1978 - Rocking the Cradle: Egypt 1978, The Grateful Dead, released 2008
- 1978 - Road Trips Volume 1 Number 4, The Grateful Dead, released 2008
- 1992 - Pieces of Africa, The Kronos Quartet (Nonesuch)
- 1995 - Venus Square Mars (Music For The Deep Night), David Philipson & Mark Nauseef (MA Recordings)
