= Blues for Allah =

1975 studio album by the Grateful Dead

Studio album by Grateful Dead
- Released: September 1, 1975
- Recorded: February 27 – May 7, 1975
- Genres: Jazz-rock; progressive rock
- Length: 44:13
- Label: Grateful Dead
- Producer: Grateful Dead

Grateful Dead chronology
From the Mars Hotel (1974)	Blues for Allah (1975)	Steal Your Face (1976)

Singles from Blues for Allah
- 1. "The Music Never Stopped" Released: September 1975; 2. "Franklin's Tower" Released: January 1976

Blues for Allah is the eighth studio album (twelfth album overall) by the Grateful Dead. It was released on September 1, 1975, and was the band's third album released through their own Grateful Dead Records label. The album was recorded between February and May 1975 during an extended hiatus from touring. Recorded at rhythm guitarist and vocalist Bob Weir's home studio, the music on Blues for Allah further showcases the jazz fusion influence shown on the band's previous two records while also having a more experimental sound influenced by Middle Eastern scales and musical styles, which is also reflected in the album's lyrical content.

Upon release, Blues for Allah became the band's highest-charting album up to that point, peaking at number 12 in the US during a thirteen-week chart run and becoming their third straight top 20 album. Two singles were released to promote the album—"The Music Never Stopped" and "Franklin's Tower"—with the former cracking the Billboard Hot 100. The album initially received mixed reviews, but has retrospectively been praised for its melding of new styles and increased emphasis on jamming and improvisation in comparison with the band's other studio efforts.

== Recording ==
Blues for Allah was recorded after the Dead began a band hiatus in October 1974. Conscious of needing a new album release for their independent label, the band initiated the project in January 1975. In contrast to the commercial studios employed for their previous studio albums, the band used the studio that rhythm guitarist Bob Weir had built at his new home in Mill Valley, California. Rather than their usual approach of recording studio versions of songs that had matured on stage, the tracks were developed in the studio setting. According to manager Rock Scully, this was in part an attempt by lead guitarist Jerry Garcia to ensure more involvement in the writing process from other band members. In creating material from scratch, the band were able to progress beyond the previous genres in which they had played. Garcia explained "We're working on creating styles, rather than just being eclectic or synthesizing other styles. Thus, it's a little bit more difficult, and considerably more experimental."

== Music and lyrics ==
During the writing and recording of the album, a discernable Middle Eastern theme emerged, supported by Robert Hunter's lyrics. Non-Western time signatures on some of the material added to the concept, as well as experiments with instrumentation, such as flute on the Bach-inspired "Sage & Spirit" (named for Scully's daughters). Garcia said he was "creating scales that generated their own harmony in ways that weren't symmetrical in regular, classical major-minor relationships." Bassist Phil Lesh recalled "Jerry brought in a strange, almost atonal melodic entity that would evolve into the title song and sequence for the album, and I had sketched out a little Latin-flavored, seven-beat instrumental number inspired by Shelley's poem 'Ozymandias' called 'King Solomon's Marbles'. Besides 'Crazy Fingers,' his marvelous essay in smoky ambiguity, Jerry also contributed a triptych of already written tunes ("Help on the Way", "Slipknot", and "Franklin's Tower") that would become, in live performance, one of our finest exploratory vehicles. Bob had a beautiful guitar instrumental, 'Sage and Spirit', and one of his stompin-est self-congratulatory rockers, 'Music Never Stopped', to round out the album."

The main riff of "Franklin's Tower" was partly inspired by the chorus of Lou Reed's 1973 hit "Walk on the Wild Side." Original credits list "King Solomon's Marbles" and "Stronger than Dirt or Milkin' the Turkey" as individual songs. However, later credits list "Stronger than Dirt" and "Milkin' the Turkey" as composed in two parts and combined to make "King Solomon's Marbles". The first section was so-named by Lesh because, like the end of the Doors' "Touch Me", a four-note cadence was reminiscent of a contemporary advertisement jingle (unlike the Doors track, the Dead did not vocalize the slogan). "The Music Never Stopped" began life as "Hollywood Cantata", a Weir-Hunter composition. Weir later used lyrics composed by his main writing partner, John Barlow. "Crazy Fingers" sets music to Hunter's series of haiku.

Describing the atmosphere, Lesh said "Bob's home studio was just large enough to hold all of us ... with various guests, notably Mickey [Hart], David Crosby, and John Cipollina, coming and going. We managed to finish the recording of Allah to our satisfaction, and took the tapes into [Artisan Sound Recorders, San Francisco] for the final mix." Band soundman Dan Healy engineered the project, assisted by Robbie Taylor. Percussionist Mickey Hart, who had sat in at the band's "farewell" concert on October 20, 1974, was invited to the sessions by Garcia and Lesh. Hart had left the band in February 1971. He contributed to the songwriting of "King Solomon's Marbles" and played occasional percussion parts (including the recording of crickets heard on the three-part title suite). Following the release of the album, he was officially reinstated as a band member shortly before the group resumed touring in 1976. Along with contributing as a background singer, Donna Godchaux emerged as a co-vocalist on "The Music Never Stopped" and the vocal sections of the title suite ("Blues for Allah" and the two-pieced "Unusual Occurrences in the Desert"). The guest flutist was Steve Schuster, a former equipment manager for Quicksilver Messenger Service who also played saxophone in the contemporaneous Keith & Donna Band.

Though they had not toured since September 1974, the Grateful Dead performed intermittently in San Francisco during the recording period. Testing the main suite from the album, they performed (as "Jerry Garcia & Friends") at the Bill Graham-produced SF SNACK Benefit (Students Need Athletics, Culture and Kicks) at Kezar Stadium in Golden Gate Park, San Francisco, California on March 23, 1975. The set, which also featured Merl Saunders (organ) and Ned Lagin (electric piano), was subsequently released on the bonus disc of Beyond Description). Consideration was given to naming the album after King Faisal of Saudi Arabia, who was assassinated after recording began. The band had been told that he was a fan of the Grateful Dead. Ultimately, Hunter considered his lyrics for the title track a requiem for the ruler. The song also references One Thousand and One Nights.

== Release and cover art ==
The front cover artwork features an iconic image of a frizzy-haired, fiddling skeleton, wearing a crimson thawb and sunglasses, sitting in the window of an ancient rock wall. The work, titled "The Fiddler", was painted in the summer of 1974 by Philip Garris, and was awarded both the gold medal and the Award of Merit from the Society of Illustrators. For the cover of the contemporaneous debut album by Kingfish, Garris painted an image with similar elements. (During the Dead's hiatus, Kingfish featured Bob Weir). The back cover art features a similar background with a group portrait of band members, illustrated in relief. Original pressings had a single-sheet insert with lyrics in both English and Arabic.

Unusual for a Grateful Dead album are the number of instrumentals: "Slipknot!", both parts of "King Solomon's Marbles", Weir's "Sage & Spirit" and the "Sand Castles and Glass Camels" section of "Blues for Allah". The nearly structureless title suite that closes the album was performed three times in 1975 and then retired, while several other songs written for the album were performed regularly for the rest of the Dead's career; specifically "Crazy Fingers", "The Music Never Stopped" and the "Help on the Way->Slipknot!->Franklin's Tower" sequence (the last section of which was often played separately).

"Hunter's work was dramatically different from the tall tale songs ("Tennessee Jed", "Ramble on Rose") of the early 70s, or the lyric blurt of "Eyes of the World". His tone was spare and tight."

— Dennis McNally (biographer)

Drummer Bill Kreutzmann recalled, "Once we started performing them live ... we turned a corner and it was a whole other ball game. Those songs are among our very best and they lived up to their potential. We had to play them live in front of an audience in order for that to happen. Once we let them outside and started taking them for walks, they each had a growth spurt during which they really discovered themselves. The album also contained a group of really experimental songs ("Stronger than Dirt", "Unusual Occurrences in the Desert") that bordered on acid jazz composition. Wild stuff. Deep cuts."

To celebrate the release of the album, the band held a soundcheck on August 12, 1975 and then played a small concert on August 13, 1975 at the Great American Music Hall, featuring the album in its entirety. The concert performance was recorded on 16-track and released in 1991 as One from the Vault. This was the first complete show ever released by the Grateful Dead and the first of an ongoing stream of releases from the band's vault.

Two singles were released from the album, "The Music Never Stopped" and "Franklin's Tower", both backed with "Help on the Way". "The Music Never Stopped" is shorter than the album version, with a differently recorded ending. "Franklin's Tower" is an edited version and "Help on the Way" fades out before the segue to "Slipknot!" (though fading later on the second single).

Blues for Allah was the final studio album on the Grateful Dead's original independent label. Grateful Dead Records' distribution partner United Artists Records had greater involvement in the rights and publication for this album than previously (e.g. releasing the album in foreign markets on the United Artists (UA) label). This was an attempt to combat counterfeiting and because UA was helping fund the completion of The Grateful Dead Movie in return for further distribution rights and the completion of a soundtrack album.

Blues for Allah was in and out of print after the band's move to Arista Records. It was re-pressed in 1979 by UA's Liberty imprint. The album was first released on CD in 1987, after which it has remained in print. It was remastered and expanded for the Beyond Description box set, in October 2004. This version was released separately in 2006, by Rhino Records.

The 50th Anniversary Deluxe Edition of Blues for Allah was released on September 12, 2025. A three-disc CD, it includes a remastered version of the original album. It also includes a soundcheck and rehearsal recorded on August 12, 1975 at the Great American Music Hall in San Francisco, several songs from the March 23, 1975 concert at Kezar Stadium in San Francisco, and songs from the June 21 and 22, 1976 shows at the Tower Theater in Upper Darby, Pennsylvania. Additionally, the original album will be re-released in several different vinyl LP versions and in digital formats.

== Critical reception ==
Professional ratings
Review scores
Source	Rating
AllMusic	4.5/5 stars
Christgau's Record Guide	C−

Reviews for Blues for Allah have ranged widely. Reviewing in 1975 for Rolling Stone, Billy Altman wrote that the LP's first side "works beautifully" for the most part, but side two is "total washout". In a retrospective review for AllMusic, Lindsay Planer felt the album "capture[d] the Dead at their most natural and inspired." However, he also felt the title suite was "incongruous when compared to the remainder of this thoroughly solid effort."

Gramophone magazine's reviewer said the band has "discarded their blues approach and opted for semi-country and jazz-rock. But there seems to be no real direction on Blues for Allah." Village Voice critic Robert Christgau, who had been a strong supporter of the band's music, was also disappointed by the record: "This time I find the arch aimlessness of their musical approach neurasthenic and their general muddleheadedness worthy of Yes or the Strawbs."

== Track listing ==
Side one
No.	Title	Writer(s)	Lead vocals	Length
1.	"Help on the Way"	Jerry Garcia; Robert Hunter	Garcia	3:15
2.	"Slipknot!"	Garcia; Keith Godchaux; Bill Kreutzmann; Phil Lesh; Bob Weir	instrumental	4:03
3.	"Franklin's Tower"	Garcia; Kreutzmann; Hunter	Garcia	4:32
4.	"King Solomon's Marbles"	Lesh	instrumental	1:55
5.	"Stronger than Dirt or Milkin' the Turkey"	Mickey Hart; Kreutzmann; Lesh	instrumental	3:25
6.	"The Music Never Stopped"	John Perry Barlow; Weir	Weir; Donna Godchaux	4:35
Total length:				21:45

Side two
No.	Title	Writer(s)	Lead vocals	Length
1.	"Crazy Fingers"	Garcia; Hunter	Garcia	6:41
2.	"Sage & Spirit"	Weir	instrumental	3:07
3.	"Blues for Allah"	Garcia; Hunter	Garcia; D. Godchaux; K. Godchaux; Weir	3:21
4.	"Sand Castles & Glass Camels"	Garcia; D. Godchaux; K. Godchaux; Hart; Kreutzmann; Lesh; Weir	instrumental	5:24
5.	"Unusual Occurrences in the Desert"	Garcia; Hunter	Garcia; D. Godchaux; K. Godchaux; Weir	3:48
Total length:				22:21

CD reissue
No.	Title	Length
1.	"Help on the Way" "Slipknot!"	7:21
2.	"Franklin's Tower"	4:32
3.	"King Solomon's Marbles"; Part I: "Stronger than Dirt"; Part II: "Milkin' the Turkey"	5:17
4.	"The Music Never Stopped"	4:35
5.	"Crazy Fingers"	6:42
6.	"Sage & Spirit"	3:07
7.	"Blues for Allah" "Sand Castles & Glass Camels" "Unusual Occurrences in the Desert"	12:33
Total length:		44:06

Beyond Description reissue bonus tracks
No.	Title	Writer(s)	Lead vocals	Length
8.	"Groove #1" (studio outtake, recorded February 27, 1975)	Garcia; K. Godchaux; Hart; Kreutzmann; Lesh; Weir	instrumental	5:42
9.	"Groove #2" (studio outtake, recorded February 27, 1975)	Garcia; K. Godchaux; Hart; Kreutzmann; Lesh; Weir	instrumental	7:32
10.	"Distorto" (studio outtake, recorded February 28, 1975)	Garcia	instrumental	8:10
11.	"A to E Flat Jam" (studio outtake, recorded February 27, 1975)	Garcia; K. Godchaux; Hart; Kreutzmann; Lesh; Weir	instrumental	4:35
12.	"Proto 18 Proper" (studio outtake, recorded February 27, 1975)	Garcia; K. Godchaux; Hart; Kreutzmann; Lesh; Weir	instrumental	4:16
13.	"Hollywood Cantata" (studio outtake, recorded May 7, 1975)	Weir; Hunter	Weir	4:14
Total length:				78:42

Notes:

- "Franklin's Tower" contains the subtitle "(Roll Away the Dew)" on the LP edition's lyric sheet.
- "Distorto" is an early instrumental version of "Crazy Fingers"; "Hollywood Cantata" is an early version of "The Music Never Stopped" with different lyrics.

=== 50th Anniversary Edition ===
Disc 1 (2025 Remaster)
No.	Title	Length
1.	"Help on the Way" "Slipknot!"	7:23
2.	"Franklin's Tower"	4:35
3.	"King Solomon's Marbles"; Part I: "Stronger than Dirt"; Part II: "Milkin' the Turkey"	5:16
4.	"The Music Never Stopped"	4:37
5.	"Crazy Fingers"	6:42
6.	"Sage & Spirit"	3:07
7.	"Blues for Allah" "Sand Castles & Glass Camels" "Unusual Occurrences in the Desert"	12:34
Total length:		44:54

Disc 2
No.	Title	Writer(s)	Recording date and venue	Length
1.	"Help on the Way" (rehearsal)	Garcia; Hunter	August 12, 1975 – Great American Music Hall	3:22
2.	"Slipknot!" (rehearsal)	Garcia; Godchaux; Kreutzmann; Lesh; Weir	August 12, 1975 – Great American Music Hall	4:20
3.	"Franklin's Tower" (rehearsal)	Garcia; Kreutzmann; Hunter	August 12, 1975 – Great American Music Hall	3:30
4.	"Help on the Way" (rehearsal)	Garcia; Hunter	August 12, 1975 – Great American Music Hall	2:05
5.	"Slipknot!" (rehearsal)	Garcia; Godchaux; Kreutzmann; Lesh; Weir	August 12, 1975 – Great American Music Hall	4:07
6.	"Franklin's Tower" (rehearsal)	Garcia; Kreutzmann; Hunter	August 12, 1975 – Great American Music Hall	7:16
7.	"King Solomon's Marbles" (rehearsal)	Lesh	August 12, 1975 – Great American Music Hall	6:23
8.	"Crazy Fingers" (rehearsal)	Garcia; Hunter	August 12, 1975 – Great American Music Hall	9:06
9.	"Sage and Spirit" (rehearsal)	Weir	August 12, 1975 – Great American Music Hall	3:32
10.	"Blues for Allah"	Garcia; Hunter	March 23, 1975 – Kezar Stadium	10:01
11.	"Stronger than Dirt (Or Milkin' the Turkey)"	Hart; Kreutzmann; Lesh	March 23, 1975 – Kezar Stadium	6:30
12.	"Drums"	Hart; Kreutzmann	March 23, 1975 – Kezar Stadium	3:37
13.	"Stronger than Dirt (Or Milkin' the Turkey)"	Hart; Kreutzmann; Lesh	March 23, 1975 – Kezar Stadium	9:44
14.	"Blues for Allah"	Garcia; Hunter	March 23, 1975 – Kezar Stadium	3:29

Disc 3
No.	Title	Writer(s)	Recording date and venue	Length
1.	"The Music Never Stopped"	Weir; Barlow	June 21, 1976 – Tower Theater	7:05
2.	"Help on the Way"	Garcia; Hunter	June 21, 1976 – Tower Theater	3:46
3.	"Slipknot!"	Garcia; Godchaux; Kreutzmann; Lesh; Weir	June 21, 1976 – Tower Theater	9:30
4.	"Franklin's Tower"	Garcia; Kreutzmann; Hunter	June 21, 1976 – Tower Theater	11:17
5.	"Crazy Fingers"	Garcia; Hunter	June 22, 1976 – Tower Theater	12:56
6.	"Comes a Time"	Garcia; Hunter	June 22, 1976 – Tower Theater	8:06
7.	"Eyes of the World"	Garcia; Hunter	June 22, 1976 – Tower Theater	12:24
8.	"Dancing in the Street"	Marvin Gaye; William Stevenson; Ivy Jo Hunter	June 22, 1976 – Tower Theater	12:21

== Blues for Allah: The Angel's Share ==
Blues for Allah: The Angel's Share

Studio album by Grateful Dead
- Released: September 25, 2025
- Recorded: February 28 – July 7, 1975
- Length: 92:30
- Label: Rhino

Grateful Dead chronology
Dave's Picks Volume 55 (2025)	Blues for Allah: The Angel's Share (2025)	Dave's Picks Volume 56 (2025)

On September 25, 2025, an album of previously unreleased rehearsal recordings without vocals, titled Blues for Allah: The Angel's Share, was released in streaming and digital download formats.

=== Track listing ===
No.	Title	Recording date	Length
1.	"Distorto"	February 28, 1975	8:07
2.	"Proto 18 Proper"	February 28, 1975	2:09
3.	"Stronger than Dirt"	February 28, 1975	9:43
4.	"The Music Never Stopped"	February 28, 1975	11:34
5.	"Sand Castles and Glass Camels"	March 5, 1975	4:06
6.	"Jam / Blues for Allah"	March 5, 1975	6:27
7.	"Surf Jam"	March 26, 1975	7:50
8.	"Crazy Fingers"	April 2, 1975	6:12
9.	"Help on the Way / Slipknot!"	April 2, 1975	3:49
10.	"Franklin's Tower"	June 5, 1975	7:20
11.	"Help on the Way / Slipknot!" (version 1)	June 5, 1975	7:52
12.	"Help on the Way / Slipknot!" (version 2)	June 5, 1975	3:00
13.	"King Solomon's Marbles"	July 7, 1975	5:04
14.	"They Love Each Other"	July 7, 1975	5:18
15.	"Lazy Lightnin' / Supplication"	July 7, 1975	3:51

== Personnel ==
Grateful Dead

- Jerry Garcia – guitar, vocals, production
- Donna Jean Godchaux – vocals, production
- Keith Godchaux – keyboards, vocals, production
- Mickey Hart – percussion, crickets, production
- Bill Kreutzmann – drums, percussion, production
- Phil Lesh – bass guitar, production
- Bob Weir – guitar, vocals, production

Additional musicians

- Steven Schuster – flute, reeds
- Ned Lagin – electric piano (3/23/75 Kezar Stadium tracks only)
- Merl Saunders – organ (3/23/75 Kezar Stadium tracks only)

Technical personnel

- Philip Garris – cover, illustrations
- Joe Gastwirt – remastering
- Dan Healy – engineer, mixing
- Robert Taylor – assistant engineering

Reissue personnel

- James Austin – production
- Hugh Brown – design, art direction
- Reggie Collins – annotation
- Jimmy Edwards – associate production
- Sheryl Farber – editorial supervision
- David Fricke – liner notes
- Joe Gastwirt – mastering, production consultation
- Robin Hurley – associate production
- Eileen Law – research
- David Lemieux – production
- Richard McCaffrey – photography
- Hale Milgrim – associate production
- Scott Pascucci – associate production
- Ed Perlstein – photography
- Cameron Sears – executive production
- Rob Taylor – assistant engineering
- Steve Vance – design, art direction

== Charts ==
Billboard

Year	Chart	Position
1975	Pop Albums	12

Singles – Billboard

Year	Single	Chart	Position
1975	"The Music Never Stopped"	Pop Singles	81

2025 chart performance for Blues for Allah
Chart (2025)	Peak position
Hungarian Albums (MAHASZ)	31
