= Road Trips Volume 1 Number 4 =

Live album by Grateful Dead
- Released: September 30, 2008
- Recorded: October 21–22, 1978
- Genre: Rock
- Length: 159:13 bonus disc: 58:36
- Label: Grateful Dead
- Producer: Grateful Dead

Grateful Dead chronology
Rocking the Cradle: Egypt 1978 (2008)	Road Trips Volume 1 Number 4 (2008)	Road Trips Volume 2 Number 1 (2008)

Alternative cover
- Road Trips Volume 1 Number 4 Bonus Disc

Professional ratings
Review scores
Source	Rating
Glide	4/5 stars
The Music Box	4/5 stars

Road Trips Volume 1 Number 4 is a two-CD live album by the American rock band the Grateful Dead. The fourth in their "Road Trips" series of albums, it was released on September 30, 2008. It was recorded at the Winterland Arena in San Francisco, California, on October 21 and 22, 1978.

A third, "bonus" disc was included with early shipments of the album. The bonus disc contains songs recorded live at Winterland on October 17 and 21, 1978.

Road Trips Volume 1 Number 4 is subtitled From Egypt with Love. The Winterland concerts of October 17, 18, 20, 21, and 22, 1978, were the first shows played by the Dead after their concerts near the Great Pyramid of Giza in Egypt a month earlier. Songs from the Egypt performances are contained in the album Rocking the Cradle: Egypt 1978, which was released on the same day as Road Trips Volume 1 Number 4.

Road Trips Volume 1 Number 4 includes a few minutes of music from an audience recording, edited into the mix to complete several songs that were cut on the master soundboard tapes. These songs are "Sugaree", "Stella Blue", "Sugar Magnolia", and "Goin' Down the Road Feeling Bad", along with "He's Gone" on the bonus disc.

== Track listing ==
=== Disc one ===
October 21, 1978

1. "Sugaree" (Jerry Garcia, Robert Hunter) – 13:40
2. "Passenger" (Phil Lesh, Peter Monk) – 3:39
3. "Stagger Lee" (Garcia, Hunter) – 7:28
4. "I Need A Miracle" (Bob Weir, John Barlow) – 7:37
5. "Got My Mojo Working" > (Preston Foster) – 12:12
6. "The Other One" > (Weir) – 7:32
7. "Stella Blue" > (Garcia, Hunter) – 11:53
8. "Sugar Magnolia" (Weir, Hunter) – 8:48
9. "U.S. Blues" (Garcia, Hunter) – 5:42

=== Disc two ===
October 22, 1978

1. "Ollin Arageed" > (Hamza El Din) – 3:30
2. "Deal" (Garcia, Hunter) – 6:28
3. "Peggy-O" (traditional, arranged by Grateful Dead) – 9:10
4. "Jack Straw" (Weir, Hunter) – 6:32
5. "Scarlet Begonias" > (Garcia, Hunter) – 11:44
6. "Fire on the Mountain" (Mickey Hart, Hunter) – 12:40
7. "Not Fade Away" > (Norman Petty, Buddy Holly) – 21:43
8. "Goin' Down the Road Feeling Bad" (traditional, arranged by Grateful Dead) – 7:56

=== Bonus Disc ===
October 21, 1978

1. "Bertha" > (Garcia, Hunter) – 7:17
2. "Good Lovin' " (Arthur Resnick, Rudy Clark) – 7:49
3. "Estimated Prophet" > (Weir, Barlow) – 14:52
4. "He's Gone" (Garcia, Hunter) – 10:35

October 17, 1978

5. "If I Had the World to Give" > (Garcia, Hunter) – 8:40
6. "Around and Around" (Chuck Berry) – 9:24

== Personnel ==
=== Grateful Dead ===
- Jerry Garcia – lead guitar, vocals
- Donna Jean Godchaux – vocals
- Keith Godchaux – keyboards
- Mickey Hart – drums
- Bill Kreutzmann – drums
- Phil Lesh – electric bass
- Bob Weir – rhythm guitar, vocals

=== Guest musicians ===
- Hamza El Din – oud, vocals on "Ollin Arageed"
- John Cipollina – guitar on "Not Fade Away" and "Goin' Down the Road Feeling Bad"
- Lee Oskar – harmonica on "Got My Mojo Working", "The Other One", "Stella Blue", and "Sugar Magnolia"

=== Production ===
- Produced by Grateful Dead
- Compilation produced by David Lemieux and Blair Jackson
- Edited and mastered by Jeffrey Norman at Garage Audio Mastering
- Cover art by Scott McDougall
- Package design by Steve Vance
- Liner notes written by Blair Jackson

== Concert set lists ==
The complete set lists for the "From Egypt With Love" concerts held October 17, 18, 20, 21 and 22, 1978 at Winterland Arena in San Francisco were:

October 17, 1978:

- First Set: "Promised Land", "Friend of the Devil", "Mama Tried", "Mexicali Blues", "Tennessee Jed", "I Need a Miracle", "Stagger Lee", "Jack Straw"
- Second Set: "Scarlet Begonias", "Fire on the Mountain", "Estimated Prophet", "Eyes of the World", "Drums", "If I Had the World to Give"**, "Around and Around"**
- Encore: "U.S. Blues"

October 18, 1978:

- First Set: "Sugaree", "Me and My Uncle", "Big River", "Peggy-O", "Looks Like Rain", "Stagger Lee", "New Minglewood Blues", "Candyman", "The Music Never Stopped"
- Second Set: "Bertha", "Good Lovin' ", "From the Heart of Me", "Ship of Fools", "Samson and Delilah", "Terrapin Station", "Playing in the Band", "Drums", "Mojo Jam", "Wharf Rat", "Truckin' "
- Encore: "I Need a Miracle"

October 20, 1978:

- First Set: "New Minglewood Blues", "They Love Each Other", "Cassidy", "Dire Wolf", "El Paso", "Tennessee Jed", "It's All Over Now", "Loser", "Lazy Lightning", "Supplication"
- Second Set: "Mississippi Half-Step Uptown Toodeloo", "Franklin's Tower", "Dancin' in the Streets", "Drums", "Not Fade Away", "Black Peter", "Around and Around"
- Encore 1: "Johnny B. Goode"
- Encore 2: "Shakedown Street"

October 21, 1978:

- First Set: "Ollin Arageed", "Promised Land", "Sugaree"*, "Passenger"*, "Ramble On Rose", "Looks Like Rain", "Stagger Lee"*, "I Need a Miracle"*
- Second Set: "Bertha"**, "Good Lovin' "**, "It Must've Been the Roses", "Estimated Prophet"**, "He's Gone"**, "Drums", "Got My Mojo Working"*, "The Other One"*, "Stella Blue"*, "Sugar Magnolia"*
- Encore: "U.S. Blues"*

October 22, 1978:

- First Set: "Ollin Arageed"*, "Deal"*, "Me and My Uncle", "Big River", "Friend of the Devil", "New Minglewood Blues", "Peggy-O"*, "Jack Straw"*
- Second Set: "Scarlet Begonias"*, "Fire on the Mountain"*, "Samson and Delilah", "From the Heart of Me", "Drums", "Not Fade Away"*, "Caution Jam"*, "Mojo Jam"*, "Goin' Down the Road Feeling Bad"*
- Encore: "Johnny B. Goode"

* appears on Road Trips Volume 1 Number 4
** appears on bonus disc
