= Dave's Picks Volume 48 =

Live album by Grateful Dead
- Released: October 27, 2023
- Recorded: November 20, 1971
- Venue: Pauley Pavilion
- Genre: Rock
- Length: 224:24
- Label: Rhino
- Producer: Grateful Dead

Grateful Dead chronology
Wake of the Flood: The Angel's Share (2023)	Dave's Picks Volume 48 (2023)	Dave's Picks Volume 49 (2024)

Dave's Picks Volume 48 is a three-CD live album by the rock band the Grateful Dead. It contains the complete concert recorded on November 20, 1971, at Pauley Pavilion in Los Angeles, California, on the campus of UCLA. It also includes bonus tracks recorded on October 24, 1970, at Kiel Opera House in St. Louis, Missouri. It was released on October 27, 2023, in a limited edition of 25,000 copies.

The album's liner notes include an essay by Bill Walton, who attended the 1971 show and was on the UCLA men's basketball team at the time.

The New Riders of the Purple Sage were the opening act at both the Pauley Pavilion and the Kiel Opera House concerts.

Dave's Picks Volume 48 debuted at number 33 on the Billboard 200 album sales chart. With this album, the Grateful Dead tied Frank Sinatra and Elvis Presley for the most top 40 albums with 58.

== Critical reception ==
On AllMusic, Timothy Monger said, "Asking basketball legend and notable Deadhead Bill Walton to write the liner notes for Dave's Picks, Vol. 48 was a nice touch. The concert featured here took place in November 1971 at UCLA's Pauley Pavilion, where Walton was setting the court on fire as a budding college basketball star. He was also in attendance at this show, listening to his favorite band set that same court on fire with a mix of searing psychedelic journeys ("The Other One"), glowing roots rock ("Casey Jones", "Sugar Magnolia"), and Skull & Roses-era classics ("Me and My Uncle", "Bertha")."

== Track listing ==
Disc 1

First set:

1. "Bertha" (Jerry Garcia, Robert Hunter) – 6:25
2. "Me and My Uncle" (John Phillips) – 3:26
3. "Sugaree" (Garcia, Hunter) – 7:07
4. "Beat It On Down the Line" (Jesse Fuller) – 3:54
5. "Tennessee Jed" (Garcia, Hunter) – 7:12
6. "Mexicali Blues" (Bob Weir, John Perry Barlow) – 4:34
7. "Brown-Eyed Women" (Garcia, Hunter) – 6:38
8. "El Paso" (Marty Robbins) – 5:20
9. "Big Railroad Blues" (Noah Lewis, arranged by Grateful Dead) – 4:08
10. "Jack Straw" (Weir, Hunter) – 5:12
11. "Cumberland Blues" (Garcia, Phil Lesh, Hunter) – 6:42
12. "Playing in the Band" (Weir, Mickey Hart, Hunter) – 7:05
13. "Casey Jones" (Garcia, Hunter) – 6:12
14. "One More Saturday Night" (Weir) – 4:48

Disc 2

Second set:

1. "Truckin'" > (Garcia, Lesh, Weir, Hunter) – 8:27
2. "Drums" > (Bill Kreutzmann) – 2:15
3. "The Other One" > (Weir, Kreutzmann) – 23:13
4. "Ramble On Rose" (Garcia, Hunter) – 7:25
5. "Sugar Magnolia" (Weir, Hunter) – 8:03
6. "You Win Again" (Hank Williams) – 4:38
7. "Not Fade Away" > (Norman Petty, Charles Hardin) – 6:26
8. "Goin' Down the Road Feeling Bad" > (traditional, arranged by Grateful Dead) – 7:56
9. "Not Fade Away" (Petty, Hardin) – 3:05

Disc 3

Bonus tracks – October 24, 1970 – Kiel Opera House:

1. "Dancing in the Street" (William Stevenson, Marvin Gaye, Ivy Jo Hunter) – 14:07
2. "Hurts Me Too" (Elmore James, Marshall Sehorn) – 6:10
3. "Good Lovin'" (Rudy Clark, Arthur Resnick) – 19:14
4. "St. Stephen" > (Garcia, Lesh, Hunter) – 6:11
5. "Not Fade Away" > (Petty, Hardin) – 3:00
6. "Goin' Down the Road Feeling Bad" > (traditional, arranged by Grateful Dead) – 5:31
7. "Not Fade Away" > (Petty, Hardin) – 1:12
8. "Turn On Your Lovelight" (Joseph Scott, Deadric Malone) – 18:44

== Personnel ==
Grateful Dead

- Jerry Garcia – guitar, vocals
- Bob Weir – guitar, vocals
- Phil Lesh – bass, vocals
- Bill Kreutzmann – drums
- Keith Godchaux – keyboards (disc 1 and 2)
- Ron "Pigpen" McKernan – keyboards, harmonica, vocals (disc 3)
- Mickey Hart – drums (disc 3)

Production

- Produced by Grateful Dead
- Produced for release by David Lemieux
- Mastering: Jeffrey Norman
- Recording: Rex Jackson
- Art direction, design: Steve Vance
- Cover art: John Vogl
- Liner notes essay: Bill Walton

== Charts ==
Chart performance for Dave's Picks Volume 48
Chart (2023)	Peak position
US Billboard 200	33
US Top Rock Albums (Billboard)	6
