= Infrared Sightings =

- Infrared Sightings video tape cover
- Directed by: Len Dell'Amico; Larry Lachman
- Produced by: Len Dell'Amico; Larry Lachman
- Music by: Grateful Dead
- Distributed by: Trigon Productions
- Release date: 1992
- Running time: 18 minutes
- Country: United States
- Language: English

Infrared Sightings is a video by the Grateful Dead, consisting of computer animation and other imagery set to music from their album Infrared Roses. It was released on VHS video tape and on laserdisc in 1992, and is 18 minutes long.

Infrared Roses is known to fans as "the all Drums and Space album". Produced by Grateful Dead sound designer Bob Bralove, it contains free form improvisational music recorded live at a number of different Dead concerts.

The visuals for Infrared Sightings combine computer generated images, many of them abstract, with found footage that has been altered or edited in various ways. The video is therefore somewhat reminiscent of the light shows that were projected on large screens at many Grateful Dead concerts.

== Track listing ==
- intro – FreeQuency Beach
- part 1 – Underwatermelons (music: "Riverside Rhapsody")
- part 2 – Synchronations (music: "Post-Modern Highrise Table Top Stomp")
- part 3 – Yes I Kandinsky (music: "Infrared Roses")

== Credits ==
=== Musicians ===
- Jerry Garcia – guitar
- Mickey Hart – drums, percussion
- Bill Kreutzmann – drums, percussion
- Phil Lesh – bass
- Brent Mydland – keyboards
- Bob Weir – guitar

==== With ====
- Bob Bralove
- Willie Green III

=== Production ===
- Len Dell'Amico, Larry Lachman – directors, producers
- Fritz Perlberg – executive producer
- Bob Bralove – music producer
- Maury Rosenfeld — spatio-temporal opto-orchestrator
- Fred Raimondi – visual effects and creative entity
- Sam Hamann – electronic paintmeister
- David Tristram – electropaint graphics programmer/artist
- Steve Burr, "Mad" Johnny Modell – intro sound design
- Quency – special animated appearance

== See also ==
- Grateful Dead: Backstage Pass
