= U.S. Blues =

Single by Grateful Dead

from the album From the Mars Hotel
- B-side: "Loose Lucy"
- Released: August 1974
- Length: 4:37; 3:12 (single)
- Label: Grateful Dead
- Composer: Jerry Garcia
- Lyricist: Robert Hunter
- Producer: Grateful Dead

Grateful Dead singles chronology
"Eyes of the World" (1974)	"U.S. Blues" (1974)	"The Music Never Stopped" (1975)

"U.S. Blues" is a song by American rock band the Grateful Dead. It appears as the opening track on the band's seventh studio album From the Mars Hotel (1974) and was released as a single in August of that year. Written by lead guitarist and vocalist Jerry Garcia and lyricist Robert Hunter, the song juxtaposes political observations with surreal imagery and upbeat music.

== Overview ==
An early version of "U.S. Blues", entitled "Wave That Flag" was performed live by the Grateful Dead throughout 1973. This early version contains more pessimistic and outwardly political lyrics, many of which were omitted from the final version. Garcia and Hunter continued to work on the song over the course of 1973, which David Dodd (columnist for the band's official website) notes coincided with the "less-than-triumphant close" to the Vietnam War.

Lindsay Planer of AllMusic describes the song as an "upbeat anthem" containing what he interprets to be "whimsical patriotism". Planer notes that Hunter's lyrics contain "coy political observations" which are "juxtaposed with surreal images", while also suggesting that the song's "light-hearted melody and sing along abilities" made it a clear choice for the album's single. Dodd describes the lyrics as a "collision of Americana from all directions" containing a wide range of cultural references pertaining to the history of the United States.

The finalized "U.S. Blues" first appeared in concert on February 22, 1974, and remained in the band's sets for the remainder of their career, typically as an encore. The song was covered by the ad hoc supergroup the Harshed Mellows for the Grateful Dead tribute album Deadicated (1991). Other acts who have covered the song include Wilco, Goose, and Daniel Donato with Molly Tuttle.

== Reception ==
According to Under the Radar, "U.S. Blues" has become "recognized as being among the band's finest songs". Rolling Stone ranked it at number 16 on a list of Garcia's greatest songs, praising it for "never fail[ing] to capture Garcia's wariness of the Man" throughout its onstage evolution. Ultimate Classic Rock writer Tony Rettman stated the song "might be one of their most confounding and rollicking tunes", which, in a live setting, "left the audience pumped and ready for whatever the rest of the evening had in store".
