= The Music Never Stopped (song) =

- German single cover art

Single by Grateful Dead

from the album Blues for Allah
- B-side: "Help on the Way"
- Released: September 1975
- Genre: Rock; boogie
- Length: 4:35; 3:14 (single)
- Label: Grateful Dead
- Songwriters: Bob Weir; John Perry Barlow
- Producer: Grateful Dead

Grateful Dead singles chronology
"U.S. Blues" (1974)	"The Music Never Stopped" (1975)	"Franklin's Tower" (1975)

"The Music Never Stopped" is a song by American rock band the Grateful Dead. It was written by rhythm guitarist and vocalist Bob Weir and lyricist John Perry Barlow, and appears as the fourth track on the band's eighth studio album Blues for Allah (1975). It was also released as the album's first single in September 1975, reaching number 81 on the Billboard Hot 100. In addition to lead vocals performed by Weir, the song features the first co-lead vocal performance by Donna Jean Godchaux on a Grateful Dead album.

"The Music Never Stopped" would remain a concert staple for the band throughout their existence, being played 234 times between its debut in 1975 and the band's dissolution in 1995. The song continued to appear in the setlists of post-Grateful Dead bands such as Dead & Company and Bob Weir & Wolf Bros.

== Background ==
An early version of "The Music Never Stopped" was entitled "Hollywood Cantata", with lyrics written by Robert Hunter. The song features Donna Godchaux's first lead vocal performance on a Grateful Dead album, which Record World writer Mike Harris described as a "high vocal counterpoint". David Fricke describes Godchaux's vocals as gospel-influenced, in comparison to the "newsboys' choir"-like vocals of the other band members. In This Is All a Dream We Dreamed: An Oral History of the Grateful Dead, Godchaux is quoted discussing the origin of her contribution, crediting it to Weir's desire to "get me out there a little more" and give her a solo vocal contribution. Godchaux described it as a spontaneous, quick process: "He [Weir] gave me kind of the basic melody, and from what I remember, I think we just got on the microphone and did it." The song also contains a saxophone solo played by Steven Schuster.

Multiple writers have noted the influence of funk and boogie music in "The Music Never Stopped", with David Browne of The New York Times additionally citing the track as an example of swamp rock. Stevie Chick of The Guardian describes it as being "steeped in the rhythms of the South", characterized by Weir's "prickly guitar figures" and the "down-home imagery" of the lyrics. Upon its release as a single, Record World considered the track to be "one of the more commercial sounding tunes" from its parent album. David Dodd, writing for the band's official website, calls the song "a self-portrait for the band to play and sing" which "encompasse[s] the entire experience of being on the road, playing in town after town like a traveling circus, along with the experience of the Deadheads, who would gather and behave much as he [Barlow] describe[s]". Grateful Dead: The Illustrated Trip likens it to an "unofficial theme song" for the band. Stereogum writer Michael Nelson considers the song to be "just as self-referential as 'Truckin''", this time from Barlow's perspective of the band's road lifestyle rather than Hunter's.

== Reception and legacy ==
Upon its release as a single, multiple publications noted the commercial appeal of the track in comparison with the band's previous material. Cash Box declared that "the Dead have held out for a long time before getting down to an AM-type single, and it looks like this is finally it", opining that it would "satisfy the legion of Dead Heads who will follow the guys anywhere". Record World felt that with the track, the band had "finally come up with a song that can be given serious AM consideration". However, the single stalled at number 81 on the Billboard Hot 100.

Upon Weir's death in 2026, multiple publications included "The Music Never Stopped" on lists of Weir's best songs. BrooklynVegan listed it as Weir's seventh-best composition, calling it "one of [Blues for Allah's] tightest pop songs". The Guardian stated that while its lyrics "verge on the hokey", the song contains a "groove that wouldn’t have shamed Allen Toussaint", considering the track evidence of Blues for Allah being the band's "funkiest" album. Stereogum listed it at number five on their respective list, while Ultimate Classic Rock placed it at number two, and The New York Times included it on an unnumbered list. In August 2026, Rolling Stone placed the song at number 59 on their list of the 100 best Grateful Dead songs. Writer Will Hermes deemed it to be "one of Weir's shining moments", noting its longevity within the band's repertoire.

== Charts ==
Weekly chart performance for "The Music Never Stopped"
Chart (1975)	Position
US Billboard Hot 100	81
US Cash Box Top 100	78
