= From the Mars Hotel =

Album by the rock band the Grateful Dead

Studio album by Grateful Dead
- Released: June 27, 1974
- Recorded: March 30 – April 19, 1974
- Studio: CBS (San Francisco)
- Genre: Roots rock; psychedelia
- Length: 37:26
- Label: Grateful Dead
- Producer: Grateful Dead

Grateful Dead chronology
Skeletons from the Closet: The Best of Grateful Dead (1974)	From the Mars Hotel (1974)	Blues for Allah (1975)

Singles from From the Mars Hotel
- 1. "U.S. Blues" Released: August 1974

From the Mars Hotel is the seventh studio album (eleventh overall) by rock band the Grateful Dead. It was mainly recorded in April 1974, and released on June 27, 1974. It was the second album by the band on their own Grateful Dead Records label. From the Mars Hotel came less than one year after their previous album, Wake of the Flood, and was the last before the band's then-indefinite hiatus from live touring which began in October 1974.

== Recording ==
The Grateful Dead returned to the studio at the end of March 1974, having readied another batch of songs. The majority were again composed by lead guitarist Jerry Garcia and lyricist Robert Hunter and featured Garcia's lead vocals. However, "Pride of Cucamonga" and "Unbroken Chain" were both written and sung by bassist Phil Lesh with the assistance of poet Bobby Petersen. This was the only time he would sing two songs on a Dead studio album, and they would be his final lead vocal work for the band until 1985. Rhythm guitarist Bob Weir contributed "Money Money" with writing partner John Perry Barlow.

The band chose to return to Coast Recorders on Folsom Street in San Francisco, where they had recorded "The Golden Road (To Unlimited Devotion)" as a single for their first album, in 1967. The studio had since been purchased by CBS Studios and refurbished. They produced the album themselves with engineer Roy Segal. According to Segal, Garcia liked the room because it had a more "live" sound than the Record Plant, where the band had recorded their previous album. Garcia had played in CBS Studios earlier in the year with Art Garfunkel during the sessions for Angel Clare.

Many of the Garcia-Hunter songs had been played live for up to a year or more. "U.S. Blues" had started life as "Wave That Flag" in February 1973 before being dropped and heavily rewritten; however, "Scarlet Begonias" had been introduced only in the month prior to recording. Weir's "Money Money" was arranged in the studio. A separate version of "China Doll" (also introduced in February 1973) was recorded for the previous album Wake of the Flood, but not used. Lesh had recorded demo versions of his two tracks during sessions for that album. Though Garcia had played pedal steel for the band, John McFee (of Clover) guests on the instrument for "Pride of Cucamonga". Electronic composer Ned Lagin (who frequently sat in during the group's live performances between 1970 and 1975) played synthesizer on "Unbroken Chain". Singer Sarah Fulcher (who was uncredited until the 50th anniversary reissue) provided backing vocals to "Money Money". Fulcher had provided vocals on Wake of the Flood and was part of Jerry Garcia's band with Merl Saunders in 1973, she can be heard on Garcia Live Volume 12.

As previously, the band felt stifled by studio confines. Commenting later about the sessions, drummer Bill Kreutzmann said "The studio felt contrived. It couldn’t offer the freedom of playing something live, nor the satisfaction."

While recording the album, the Grateful Dead were testing a massive touring P.A. system called The Wall of Sound. A contemporaneous test performance of the sound system was released as Dick's Picks Volume 24.

== Release ==
The album's cover art was created by Kelley/Mouse, who had previously created artwork for the band's American Beauty, Grateful Dead, and Europe '72 albums. The front depicts an actual San Francisco building, juxtaposed in an extraterrestrial landscape. The real Mars Hotel was a derelict flophouse, at 192 Fourth Street, that had been the temporary residence of Jack Kerouac and was previously used as a location in David Bowie's promotional film for "The Jean Genie". It was demolished during the Yerba Buena redevelopment – footage of which is seen in The Grateful Dead Movie – and is now the site of the Moscone West Exhibition Hall. In competing against existing distribution channels, albums on the Grateful Dead label became subject to counterfeiting. In response, and to help consumers recognize higher-quality, official pressings, the word "authentic" was embossed in a vertical column on the left margin of the cover.

Flipped image of From the Mars Hotel album cover, showing "Ugly Rumors" text.

The working title for the album was Ugly Roomers. Kreutzmann said it was "a self-deprecating dig at ourselves, but we changed it to 'rumors' out of respect to the boarders at the hotel." After another title change to From the Mars Hotel, the Ugly Rumors title was retained in stylized, vertically mirrored text.

The rear cover depicts the band as the "ugly roomers", in the guise of cartoon characters lounging in a room in outer space, watching television. Lesh wears a pharaonic nemes, Garcia a space helmet and Kreutzmann a galea. Weir is a space-clown marked with a "Z". Keyboardist Keith Godchaux bears a halo of lightning bolts and backing vocalist Donna Godchaux, who had recently become a mother, is depicted as a Madonna. The image was created from a group photograph taken in the lounge of the Cadillac Hotel in the Tenderloin district.

An edit of "U.S. Blues" was released as a single (b/w "Loose Lucy").

Four of the songs from the album remained in live rotation throughout the band's existence. "Scarlet Begonias" in particular became an extended-jam highlight, later usually paired with a segue into "Fire on the Mountain," while "U.S. Blues" was a preferred encore. "Ship of Fools" and "China Doll" were played with less frequency. For many years, Deadhead lore maintained that "Unbroken Chain" would only be performed at the band's final concert; it was finally broken out on the band's penultimate tour in March 1995 and performed at their final concert on July 9, 1995. "Money Money" was played three times, in May 1974, and then dropped by the time of the album's release, as the perceived misogyny of the song was worrisome to certain band members. "Loose Lucy" was dropped after 1974 and resurrected in 1990. Only "Pride of Cucamonga" was never played live.

With the collapse of the band's label and the move to Arista Records, the album was out of print for many years. In 1984 an audiophile-quality pressing was released by Mobile Fidelity Records, using half-speed mastering. The album's first CD release was in 1985, and it has remained in print since a 1989 CD self-release by Grateful Dead Records. It was remastered and expanded as part of the Beyond Description (1973–1989) box set, in 2004. This version was released separately by Rhino Records, in 2006.

A 50th Anniversary Deluxe Edition of From the Mars Hotel was released on June 24, 2024. A three-disc CD, it includes a remastered version of the original album, with two bonus demo tracks. It also includes a live concert recorded on May 12, 1974, at the University of Nevada, Reno (missing only the opening song, "Promised Land"). Additionally, the original album was re-released in several different vinyl LP versions.

== Critical reception ==
Professional ratings
Review scores
Source	Rating
AllMusic	4/5 stars
Christgau's Record Guide	B−
The Encyclopedia of Popular Music	4/5 stars
The Rolling Stone Album Guide	3/5 stars

Village Voice critic Robert Christgau wrote of the album: "Brighter and more uptempo than Wake of the Flood (which is not to claim it's 'high energy'), with almost as many memorable tunes as American Beauty. Robert Hunter is not progressing, however—even 'U.S. Blues,' an entertaining collection of conceits, seems received rather than found. And a Weir-Barlow song about money is just one more way for rich Marin hippies to put women down."

It was voted number 556 in the third edition of Colin Larkin's All Time Top 1000 Albums (2000).

== Influence ==
While studying law at St John's College, Oxford, in the 1970s, Tony Blair (UK prime minister 1997–2007) helped found the rock band Ugly Rumours, as a singer-guitarist. The group was named after the mirror writing on the front cover of From the Mars Hotel, using British English spelling for the word "rumors".

The group Animal Collective sampled "Unbroken Chain" for their song "What Would I Want? Sky", on their EP Fall Be Kind. It was the first sample ever cleared for use by the Grateful Dead.

== Track listing ==
Side one
No.	Title	Writer(s)	Lead singer	Length
1.	"U.S. Blues"	Jerry Garcia, Robert Hunter	Garcia	4:37
2.	"China Doll"	Garcia, Hunter	Garcia	4:09
3.	"Unbroken Chain"	Phil Lesh, Robert Petersen	Lesh	6:45
4.	"Loose Lucy"	Garcia, Hunter	Garcia	3:23

Side two
No.	Title	Writer(s)	Lead singer	Length
1.	"Scarlet Begonias"	Garcia, Hunter	Garcia, Donna Jean Godchaux	4:19
2.	"Pride of Cucamonga"	Lesh, Petersen	Lesh	4:16
3.	"Money Money"	Bob Weir, John Perry Barlow	Weir	4:21
4.	"Ship of Fools"	Garcia, Hunter	Garcia	5:22

2004/2006 reissue bonus tracks
No.	Title	Writer(s)	Lead singer	Length
9.	"Loose Lucy" (alternate take recorded August 7, 1973)	Garcia, Hunter	Garcia	4:43
10.	"Scarlet Begonias" (live at Winterland, San Francisco, California, October 16, 1974 (Note: Another track from this concert was later released on The Grateful Dead Movie Soundtrack))	Garcia, Hunter	Garcia, D. Godchaux	9:09
11.	"Money Money" (live at PNE Coliseum, Vancouver, British Columbia, May 17, 1974 (Note: Later released with complete concert on Pacific Northwest '73–'74: The Complete Recordings))	Weir, Barlow	Weir	4:19
12.	"Wave That Flag" (live at Springfield Civic Center, Springfield, Massachusetts, March 28, 1973 (Note: Later released with complete concert on Dave's Picks Volume 16))	Garcia, Hunter	Garcia	5:34
13.	"Let It Rock" (live at Jai-Alai Fronton, Miami, Florida, June 23, 1974 (Note: Later released with complete concert on Dave's Picks Volume 34))	Chuck Berry	Garcia	3:22
14.	"Pride of Cucamonga" (acoustic demo recorded August 4, 1973)	Lesh, Petersen	Lesh	4:24
15.	"Unbroken Chain" (acoustic demo recorded August 11, 1973)	Lesh, Petersen	Lesh	6:20

=== 50th Anniversary Edition ===
Bonus tracks
No.	Title	Writer(s)	Lead singer	Length
9.	"China Doll" (demo)	Garcia, Hunter	Garcia	2:47
10.	"Wave That Flag" (demo)	Garcia, Hunter	Garcia	5:00

Disc two – May 12, 1974, Mackay Stadium, Reno, Nevada
No.	Title	Writer(s)	Lead singer	Length
1.	"Sugaree"	Garcia, Hunter	Garcia	7:28
2.	"Mexicali Blues"	Weir, Barlow	Weir	3:51
3.	"Tennessee Jed"	Garcia, Hunter	Garcia	8:15
4.	"Jack Straw"	Weir, Hunter	Garcia, Weir	4:57
5.	"Brown-Eyed Women"	Garcia, Hunter	Garcia	4:59
6.	"Beat It On Down the Line"	Jesse Fuller	Weir	3:55
7.	"China Cat Sunflower"	Garcia, Hunter	Garcia	8:06
8.	"I Know You Rider"	Traditional	Garcia, Weir	6:54
9.	"El Paso"	Marty Robbins	Weir	4:32
10.	"U.S. Blues"	Garcia, Hunter	Garcia	5:15
11.	"Greatest Story Ever Told"	Weir, Hunter, Mickey Hart	Weir, D. Godchaux	4:50
12.	"It Must Have Been the Roses"	Hunter	Garcia	5:40
13.	"Me and Bobby McGee"	Kris Kristofferson, Fred Foster	Weir	5:41
14.	"Deal"	Garcia, Hunter	Garcia	4:46

Disc three – May 12, 1974, Mackay Stadium, Reno, Nevada
No.	Title	Writer(s)	Lead singer	Length
1.	"Around and Around"	Berry	Weir	6:38
2.	"Mississippi Half-Step Uptown Toodeloo"	Garcia, Hunter	Garcia	7:58
3.	"Truckin’"	Garcia, Hunter, Lesh, Weir	Garcia, Weir	10:09
4.	"The Other One"	Weir, Bill Kreutzmann	Weir	21:40
5.	"Row Jimmy"	Garcia, Hunter	Garcia	8:48
6.	"Big River"	Johnny Cash	Weir	5:41
7.	"Ship of Fools"	Garcia, Hunter	Garcia	6:15
8.	"Sugar Magnolia"	Weir, Hunter	Garcia, Weir, D. Godchaux	9:25

== From the Mars Hotel: The Angel's Share ==
From the Mars Hotel: The Angel's Share

Studio album by Grateful Dead
- Released: April 17, 2024
- Recorded: March–April 1974
- Studio: CBS San Francisco
- Label: Rhino

Grateful Dead chronology
Dave's Picks Volume 49 (2024)	From the Mars Hotel: The Angel's Share (2024)	Dave's Picks Volume 50 (2024)

On April 17, 2024, a collection of alternate takes and alternate mixes from the Mars Hotel recording sessions entitled From the Mars Hotel: The Angel's Share was released in streaming and digital download formats.

=== Track listing ===
From The Mars Hotel: The Angel's Share
No.	Title	Length
1.	"Scarlet Begonias (Takes 1 & 2)"	4:46
2.	"Scarlet Begonias (Alternate Mix)"	4:27
3.	"China Doll (Acoustic Mix)"	4:25
4.	"Money Money (Alternate version)"	4:23
5.	"Loose Lucy (Alternate Mix)"	3:15
6.	"Ship of Fools (Take 7)"	5:38
7.	"Ship of Fools (Alternate Mix)"	5:30
8.	"U.S. Blues (Takes 1 & 2)"	5:10
9.	"U.S. Blues (Take 4)"	4:35
10.	"U.S. Blues (Take 8)"	4:48
11.	"Pride of Cucamonga (Take 1)"	4:16
12.	"Pride of Cucamonga (Alternate Mix)"	4:14
13.	"Unbroken Chain (Take 1)"	6:50
14.	"Unbroken Chain (Take 5)"	6:44
15.	"Unbroken Chain (Take 6)"	6:56
16.	"Unbroken Chain (Alternate Mix)"	6:43

== Personnel ==
Grateful Dead

- Jerry Garcia – lead guitar, vocals, keyboards, production
- Donna Jean Godchaux – vocals, production
- Keith Godchaux – keyboards, vocals, production
- Bill Kreutzmann – drums, production
- Phil Lesh – bass guitar, vocals, production
- Bob Weir – guitar, vocals, production

Additional musicians

- Ned Lagin – synthesizers on "Unbroken Chain"
- John McFee – pedal steel guitar on "Pride of Cucamonga"
- Sarah Fulcher – backing vocals on "Money Money"

Technical personnel

- Phil Brown – mastering
- Mary Ann Mayer – illustrations, creation

Reissue personnel

- James Austin – production
- Hugh Brown – design, art direction
- Reggie Collins – annotation
- Jimmy Edwards – associate production
- Sheryl Farber – editorial supervision
- Tom Flye – mixing
- Joe Gastwirt – mastering, production consultation
- Robert Gatley – mixing assistance
- Robin Hurley – associate production
- Eileen Law – research
- David Lemieux – production
- Hale Milgrim – associate production
- Scott Pascucci – associate production
- Richard Pechner – photography
- Ed Perlstein – photography
- Bruce Polonsky – photography
- Cameron Sears – executive production
- Roy Segal – engineering
- Joel Selvin – liner notes
- Steve Vance – design, reissue art direction

== Chart positions ==
Billboard

Year	Chart	Position
1974	Pop Albums	16

2024 chart performance for From the Mars Hotel
Chart (2024)	Peak position
Croatian International Albums (HDU)	13
Hungarian Albums (MAHASZ)	24
Swiss Albums (Schweizer Hitparade)	79
