= Ronald Leon Rakow =

Former band manager of The Grateful Dead

- Ron Rakow
- Born: November 10, 1937 (age 88); New York City
- Other name: "Cadillac Ron"
- Education: Bachelor of Science
- Alma mater: New York University

Ronald Leon Rakow or Ron Rakow is the former head of Grateful Dead Records and Round Records, and manager of The Grateful Dead.

== Early life ==
Ron was born in Brooklyn, New York. He studied Economics at New York University where he earned his Bachelor of Science degree. He started his career as a runner on the New York Stock exchange floor and eventually was an arbitrageur and did corporate mergers and acquisitions for various corporations in New York City.

== Grateful Dead ==
Around 1965 Ron moved to San Francisco and started a small loans business called Guaranteed Factors. Not long after, he loaned money to the Grateful Dead to buy equipment and quickly joined as a photographer and later a band manager. During that time, he lived across from the street from the band at 715 Ashbury street.

In March 1972, Ron came up with the idea for Grateful Dead Records and Round Records and worked with Jerry Garcia to develop the business plan known as the 'So What Papers'. In July 1972, he was invited to Bill Kreutzmann's house to present the initial idea to the band. In April 1973, the plan was finally approved and Grateful Dead Records and Round Records was born. The labels went on to produce four of the bands records between 1973 and 1976.

== Filmography ==
Ron was also the executive producer and appears in the 1977 documentary film, The Grateful Dead Movie.

== Legal Troubles ==
On April 11, 2007, Rakow was sentenced to five years in federal prison for tax evasion of $2.2 million since 1985 from income unrelated to his relationship with The Grateful Dead.' On December 1, 2011, Rakow was released from prison.
