= Dave's Picks Volume 49 =

Live album by Grateful Dead
- Released: January 26, 2024
- Recorded: April 27–28, 1985
- Venue: Frost Amphitheater
- Genre: Rock
- Length: 285:56
- Label: Rhino
- Producer: Grateful Dead

Grateful Dead chronology
Dave's Picks Volume 48 (2023)	Dave's Picks Volume 49 (2024)	From the Mars Hotel: The Angel's Share (2024)

Dave's Picks Volume 49 is a four-CD live album by the rock band the Grateful Dead. It contains two complete concerts recorded on April 27 and 28, 1985, at Frost Amphitheater in Stanford, California. It was released on January 26, 2024, in a limited edition of 25,000 copies.

Dave's Picks Volume 49 debuted at number 25 on the Billboard 200 album sales chart. With this album, the Grateful Dead broke the record for the most top 40 albums, with 59. The previous record of 58 top 40 albums was held by both Frank Sinatra and Elvis Presley.

== Critical reception ==
On AllMusic, Timothy Monger said, "Volume 49 takes listeners back to 1985, when the Dead were celebrating their first two decades with a "20 Years So Far" tour.... Bay Area shows were always special, but Palo Alto was the band's backyard, and they cruise into these dates with easy confidence and a spirit of invention."

== Track listing ==
Disc 1

April 27, 1985 – first set:

1. "Dancing in the Street" > (William Stevenson, Marvin Gaye, Ivy Jo Hunter) – 6:30
2. "Bertha" (Jerry Garcia, Robert Hunter) – 6:18
3. "Little Red Rooster" (Willie Dixon) – 8:21
4. "Brown-Eyed Women" (Garcia, Hunter) – 4:51
5. "My Brother Esau" (Bob Weir, John Perry Barlow) – 4:49
6. "Ramble On Rose" (Garcia, Hunter) – 7:37
7. "Just Like Tom Thumb's Blues" (Bob Dylan) – 4:59
8. "Cold Rain and Snow" (traditional, arranged by Grateful Dead) – 5:46
9. "The Music Never Stopped" (Weir, Barlow) – 7:12

April 27, 1985 – second set:

10. "Scarlet Begonias" > (Garcia, Hunter) – 12:24
11. "Eyes of the World" (Garcia, Hunter) – 9:17

Disc 2

April 27, 1985 – second set, continued:

1. "Goin' Down the Road Feeling Bad" > (traditional, arranged by Grateful Dead) – 5:09
2. "Man Smart, Woman Smarter" > (Norman Span) – 6:47
3. "Drums" > (Mickey Hart, Bill Kreutzmann) – 12:24
4. "Space" > (Garcia, Phil Lesh, Weir) – 5:52
5. "The Wheel" > (Garcia, Hunter) – 5:02
6. "Truckin'" > (Garcia, Lesh, Weir, Hunter) – 5:52
7. "The Other One" > (Weir, Kreutzmann) – 5:55
8. "Black Peter" > (Garcia, Hunter) – 8:19
9. "Around and Around" > (Chuck Berry) – 3:38
10. "One More Saturday Night" (Weir) – 5:11

April 27, 1985 – encore:

11. "Keep Your Day Job" (Garcia, Hunter) – 4:19

Disc 3

April 28, 1985 – first set:

1. "Gimme Some Lovin'" > (Spencer Davis, Steve Winwood, Muff Winwood) – 5:24
2. "Mississippi Half-Step Uptown Toodeloo" (Garcia, Hunter) – 7:36
3. "New Minglewood Blues" (traditional, arranged by Grateful Dead) – 8:07
4. "Bird Song" (Garcia, Hunter) – 11:09
5. "Tons of Steel" (Brent Mydland) – 4:26
6. "China Cat Sunflower" > (Garcia, Hunter) – 5:34
7. "I Know You Rider" (traditional, arranged by Grateful Dead) – 5:34

April 28, 1985 – encore:

8. "U.S. Blues" (Garcia, Hunter) – 5:26
9. "She Belongs to Me" (Dylan) – 6:23

Disc 4

April 28, 1985 – second set:

1. "Hell in a Bucket" > (Weir, Barlow, Mydland) – 6:56
2. "Crazy Fingers" > (Garcia, Hunter) – 8:06
3. "Playing in the Band" > (Weir, Hart, Hunter) – 10:02
4. "China Doll" > (Garcia, Hunter) – 9:59
5. "Drums" > (Hart, Kreutzmann) – 7:41
6. "Space" > (Garcia, Lesh, Weir) – 10:25
7. "Playing in the Band" > (Weir, Hart, Hunter) – 3:48
8. "Wharf Rat" > (Garcia, Hunter) – 8:41
9. "Throwing Stones" > (Weir, Barlow) – 8:13
10. "Not Fade Away" (Norman Petty, Charles Hardin) – 5:46

== Personnel ==
Grateful Dead

- Jerry Garcia – guitar, vocals
- Bob Weir – guitar, vocals
- Brent Mydland – keyboards, vocals
- Phil Lesh – bass, vocals
- Bill Kreutzmann – drums
- Mickey Hart – drums

Production

- Produced by Grateful Dead
- Produced for release by David Lemieux
- Executive producer: Mark Pinkus
- Associate producer: Ivette Ramos
- Recording: Dan Healy
- Mastering: Jeffrey Norman
- Art direction, design, cover art: Steve Vance
- Photos: Robbi Cohn, Bob Andres
- Liner notes essay: David Lemieux

== Charts ==
Chart performance for Dave's Picks Volume 49
Chart (2024)	Peak position
US Billboard 200	25
US Top Rock Albums (Billboard)	5
