= Great American Music Hall =

San Francisco music venue

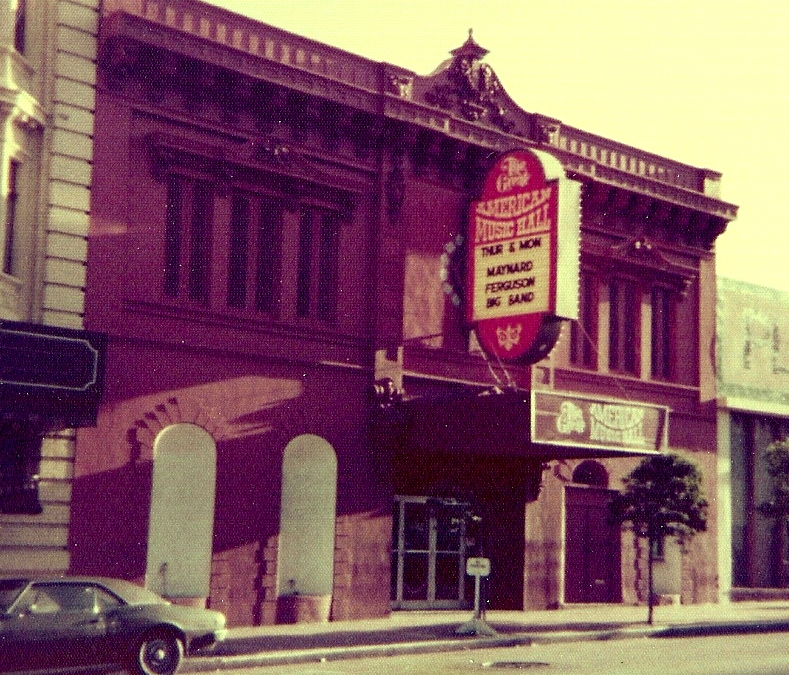
- The Great American Music Hall, 1976.
- Interactive map of Great American Music Hall
- Former names: Blanco's (1907–1935, 1948); Music Box (1936–1945)
- Location: 859 O'Farrell Street; San Francisco, California; United States
- Coordinates: 37.785048°N 122.418835°W
- Owner: Slim's Presents
- Capacity: 700
- Type: Nightclub

Construction
- Opened: 1907
- Renovated: 1972

Website
- gamh.com

The Great American Music Hall is a concert hall in San Francisco, California. It is located on O'Farrell Street in the Tenderloin neighborhood on the same block as the Mitchell Brothers O'Farrell Theatre. It is known for its decorative balconies, columns, and frescoes and for its history of unique entertainment, which has included burlesque dancing as well as jazz, folk music, and rock and roll concerts. The capacity of the hall is 700 people.

== History ==
=== Blanco's and Music Box ===
The hall was established in 1907 during the period of rebuilding that followed the 1906 earthquake. Its interior was designed by a French architect. It was originally called Blanco's, after a notorious Barbary Coast house of prostitution.

In 1936, Sally Rand, known for her fan dance and bubble dance acts, acquired the property and branded it the Music Box. It closed with the end of World War II, reopened in 1948 as a jazz club that reused the name Blanco's, and in the 1950s the building was used by members of the Loyal Order of the Moose. The venue went into a long decline that nearly resulted in the demolition of the building.

=== Great American Music Hall ===
In 1972 the venue was purchased by Tom Bradshaw. Newly refurbished and painted, the building was renamed the Great American Music Hall. In 1973-1974 the Stuart Little Band became the GAMH house band and performed as opening act for many GAMH headliners: Cal Tjader, Sarah Vaughan, Carmen McRae, Marcel Marceau, Stan Getz, Mongo Santamaria, Dizzy Gillespie, pianist Bill Evans, Joe Pass, Cleo Laine, Herbie Mann, Buddy Rich, the Tubes, etc. In 1974, the new line-up of Journey debuted there. Jerry Garcia played at the Great American Music Hall a total of thirty times - mainly with Merl Saunders, but also with the Grateful Dead, Keith Godchaux and Donna Godchaux in the Keith & Donna Band, the Great American String Band, and the Legion of Mary - his jazz influenced rock band. The Legion of Mary debuted and recorded a live album called Legion of Mary: The Jerry Garcia Collection, Vol. 1 which included material performed at the Great American Music Hall in 1974. The Grateful Dead's album One from the Vault was also performed and recorded at the venue at a 'by invitation only' event. In 1982, Robin Williams filmed his HBO special, "An Evening with Robin Williams". In the early '90s, radio station KKSF 103.7FM hosted several large "Music Without Borders Listener Appreciation Concerts", with performances by Opafire as well as other Contemporary Jazz groups. In May 2000, during the dot-com boom, the venue was acquired for a reportedly seven-figure sum by music website Riffage.com, and went to Diablo Management Group when Riffage.com ceased operations in December 2000. In 2013, the Great American Music Hall was named the sixth-best rock club in America in a Rolling Stone poll of artists and managers.

== Live Performances at the Great American Hall ==
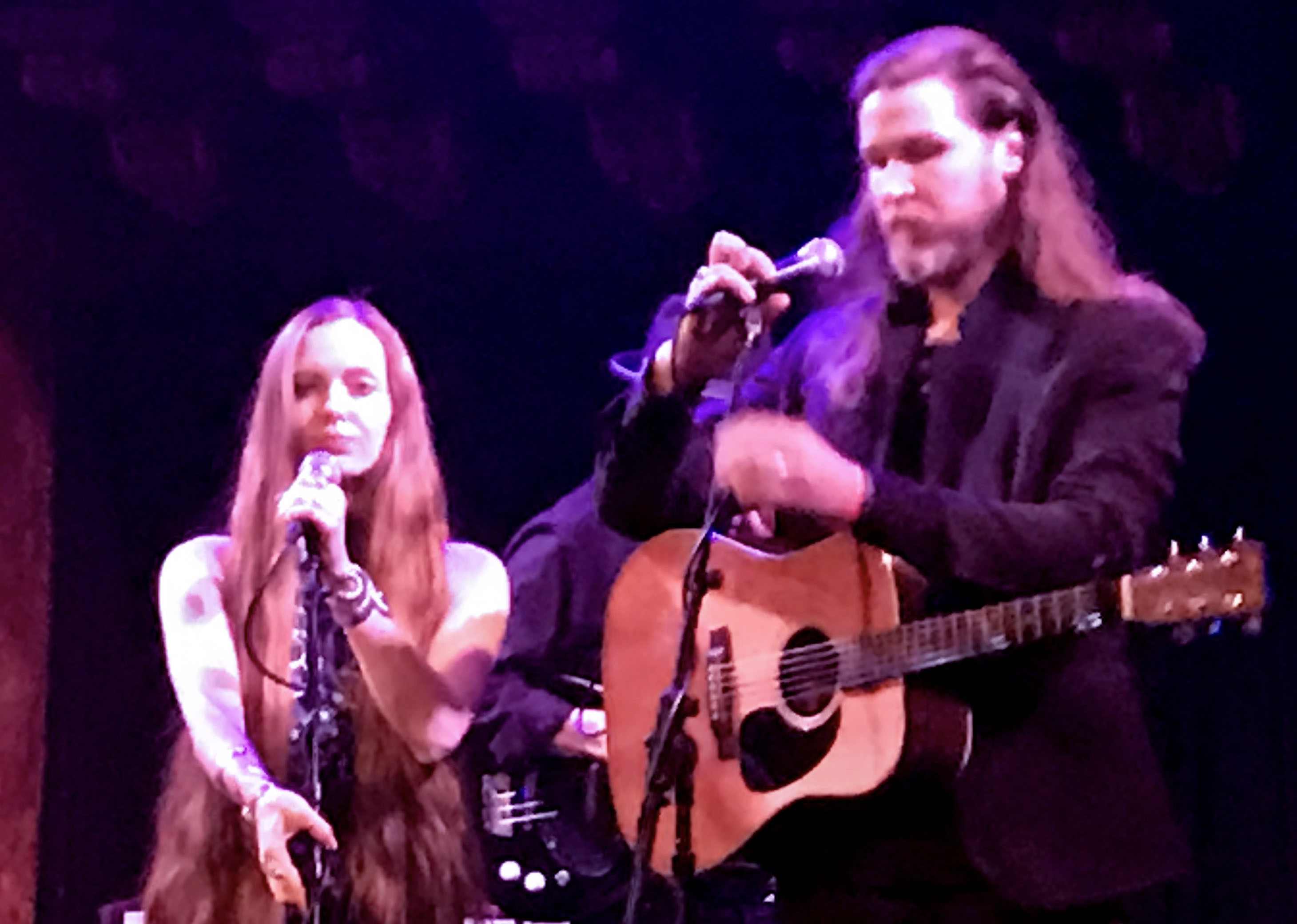
Great American Canyon Band opened for Tennis at the Great American Music Hall on February 25, 2017

== Recordings ==
- Billy Joel recorded a set on June 8, 1975. He recorded "New York State of Mind" there that year which was released on Spotify, et al., on November 4, 2021. The album "Live from the Great American Music Hall" was released in April 2023.
- The Grateful Dead's album One from the Vault, the first of its "From the Vault" series, was recorded at the Great American Music Hall in August 1975.
- David Bromberg recorded portions of How Late'll Ya Play 'Til? at the Great American Music Hall in June 1976.
- Ry Cooder recorded Show Time on December 14 & 15, 1976.
- McCoy Tyner recorded The Greeting on March 17 & 18, 1978.
- Sonny Rollins recorded Don't Stop the Carnival on April 13, 14 & 15, 1978.
- Carmen McRae recorded "At The Great American Music Hall" in 1976.
- Doc and Merle Watson recorded "Live and Pickin' " on October 11–13, 1978. At the Grammy Awards of 1980 "Big Sandy/Leather Britches" won the Grammy Award for Best Country Instrumental Performance.
- Betty Carter recorded her live vocal jazz album The Audience with Betty Carter at the Great American Music Hall in 1979.
- The Carmen McRae-Betty Carter Duets recorded on January 30 - Feb 1, 1987 at the Great American Music Hall.
- Herbie Mann made a direct-to-disc recording, All Blues/Forest Rain, in 1980.
- Carla Bley recorded Live! on August 19–21, 1981.
- Robin Williams filmed his 1982 HBO special, "An Evening with Robin Williams" at the Great American Music Hall.
- The Radiators Live at the "Great American Music Hall" in 1998.
- Boz Scaggs recorded his 2004 released CD/DVD Greatest Hits Live in August 2003.
- The Secret Chiefs 3 recorded their DVD Live at the Great American Music Hall in 2007.
- Jonathan Coulton recorded his album Best. Concert. Ever. in February 2008.
- Fantômas recorded their album and video The Director's Cut Live: A New Year's Revolution on December 31, 2008.
- Richard Thompson recorded portions of his album Dream Attic in February 2010.
- The Mother Hips Live at the Great American Music Hall December 15–16, 2017
- Ry Cooder recorded his 2011 concert with Corridos Famosos at the Great American Music Hall
