= Grateful Dead Records =

US record label

Grateful Dead Records was a record label established in 1973 by the American rock group Grateful Dead. The band released four vinyl LPs on the label in the mid-1970s: Wake of the Flood in 1973, From the Mars Hotel in 1974, Blues for Allah in 1975, and a live double album, Steal Your Face, in 1976. Album distribution was negotiated and contracted by the band's label through United Artists Records. A second label, Round Records, was used to release solo albums by members of the band.

== History ==
Initially, the band established their own label ostensibly to exercise more control over artistic content and other choices in and out of the studio. In a letter mailed to fans, they announced their plans to establish their own label, going so far as to comment that one of their fantasies included distributing their albums via ice cream trucks outside concert venues during their concerts, and, beginning with Wake of the Flood, hoped to grasp control of all aspects of recording and distribution of their own records. In addition, they hoped that the fans would act "as part of our eyes, ears and feet on the ground to keep the scene straight locally". However, Grateful Dead Records resulted in a traditional business venture along the same routine as was usual. After a few years, the added stress of handling business matters took its toll, and the bandmates opted out of operating the label and signed with Arista Records in 1977. Grateful Dead Records was revived in the 1990s and 2000s for CD reissues of the band's non-major-label and "authorized bootleg" live concert releases such as the Dick's Picks series.

== See also ==
- List of record labels
- Ronald Leon Rakow
