= Groovies' Greatest Grooves =

Compilation album by The Flamin' Groovies
- Released: 1989
- Recorded: 1971–1979
- Genre: Power pop
- Length: 75 minutes
- Label: Sire
- Producer: Cyril Jordan, Dave Edmunds, Roger Bechirian

Professional ratings
Review scores
Source	Rating
AllMusic	5/5 stars
Encyclopedia of Popular Music	4/5 stars

Groovies' Greatest Grooves is a 1989 compilation album by U.S. rock band the Flamin' Groovies, released by Sire Records. The tracks were selected by Rolling Stone Senior Writer Michael Goldberg and freelance rock critic Michael Snyder, who also co-wrote the liner notes. Goldberg and Snyder wanted to emphasize the Groovies' original material, and so 18 of the album's 24 songs are Groovies originals.

It collected tracks from throughout the group's career, and showcased their versatility and changing styles. It draws heavily from their three Sire Records albums, with 20 of the 24 songs from those records. (The exceptions are "Teenage Head", from the 1971 album of the same name, the two 1972 UA singles "Slow Death" and "Tallahassee Lassie," compiled on A Bucket of Brains, and the 1981 Gold Star Studios recording of "River Deep, Mountain High".)

Groovies' Greatest Grooves is notable for being one of the few CDs released in the CD+G format.

== Track listing ==
All songs by Cyril Jordan and Chris Wilson unless noted

1. "Shake Some Action"
2. "Teenage Head" (Roy Loney, Jordan)
3. "Slow Death" (Loney, Jordan)
4. "Tallahassee Lassie" (Frank Slay, Bob Crewe, Freddy Picariello)
5. "Yeah My Baby" (Jordan, Wilson, Dave Edmunds)
6. "Yes It's True"
7. "First Plane Home"
8. "In the U.S.A."
9. "Between the Lines"
10. "Don't You Lie to Me" (Hudson Whittaker, Chuck Berry)
11. "You Tore Me Down"
12. "I'll Cry Alone"
13. "Please Please Girl"
14. "Down Down Down" (Trevor Burton)
15. "Yes I Am"
16. "Teenage Confidential"
17. "I Can't Hide"
18. "Absolutely Sweet Marie" (Bob Dylan)
19. "Don't Put Me On"
20. "I Saw Her" (Jordan, Mike Wilhelm, Robert Hunter)
21. "All I Wanted"
22. "Jumpin' in the Night"
23. "There's a Place" (Lennon–McCartney)
24. "River Deep, Mountain High" (Phil Spector, Ellie Greenwich, Jeff Barry)

== Personnel ==
- Cyril Jordan - guitar, vocals
- Roy Loney - vocals, guitar on 2
- Chris Wilson - vocals, guitar on all except 2
- Tim Lynch - guitar on 2
- James Ferrell - guitar on 1, 3–4, 6, 10–13, 16–17, 20
- Mike Wilhelm - guitar on 5, 7–9, 14–15, 18–19, 21–24
- George Alexander - bass
- Danny Mihm - drums on 1–4, 11
- David Wright - drums on all except 1–4, 11
- Mark Dunwoody - keyboards on 24

== Credits ==
- Dave Edmunds - producer on 1, 3, 5–6, 9–13, 16–17, 19–21, 23
- Richard Robinson - producer on 2
- Roger Bechirian and Cyril Jordan - producers on 7–8, 14–15, 18, 22
- Cyril Jordan - producer on 4 (as "Flowerboy Venus"), 24
