= Fantastic Plastic (album) =

Studio album by The Flamin' Groovies
- Released: September 22, 2017
- Recorded: Studio D Recording and Severn Sound Studios
- Genre: Power pop
- Length: 39:38
- Label: Severn
- Producers: Cyril Jordan, J. Jaffe

The Flamin' Groovies chronology
A Bucket of Brains (1995)	Fantastic Plastic (2017)

Fantastic Plastic is the ninth studio album by The Flamin' Groovies, released on September 22, 2017, and produced by Cyril Jordan and J. Jaffe. The first new album from the Groovies since 1993, it features the reunion of the Groovies most commercially successful line-up, the classic 1970s combo of guitarists/vocalists Jordan and Chris Wilson and bassist George Alexander, who recorded three albums together before splitting up in 1981.

== Background ==
For 2013, the Hoodoo Gurus, with whom the Flamin' Groovies had played in Australia, put together an invitational named Dig It Up to play at four cities in Australia and invited Jordan to participate. Jordan then invited Alexander and Wilson, who both agreed to the limited tour, and the band added drummer Victor Penalosa. After the Australian dates, the band chose to stay together and eventually recorded a single ("Crazy Macy") to celebrate the 50th anniversary of the founding of the Groovies in 1968, which was released on vinyl in 2016. This album followed the next year.

In addition to the members of the Groovies, co-producer/engineer J. Jaffe, bassist Alec Palao and drummer Prairie Prince, who were original members of Jordan's mid-2000s band "Magic Christian", and bassist Steve Gomes and drummer Rob Stupka of the Fabulous Thunderbirds also perform on the album. The NRBQ song "I Want You Bad", one of the Groovies' two non-originals on the album, was previously covered by the group's 1970s producer Dave Edmunds.

Jordan painted the album cover as an homage to MAD Magazine artist Jack Davis; it draws from Davis' cover for the 1959 Hans Conried/Alice Pearce novelty album Monster Rally. Also, the album and CD label pays homage to the Laurie Records labels of the 1960s. The cover also shows images of the Flamin' Groovies previous albums on Sire Records: three studio albums recorded by this incarnation of the band (Shake Some Action, Flamin' Groovies Now, and Jumpin' in the Night), along with the group's greatest hits album focused on that period (Groovies' Greatest Grooves).

== Critical Reception ==
Professional ratings
Review scores
Source	Rating
AllMusic	4/5 stars

== Track listing ==
All tracks are written by Cyril Jordan and Chris Wilson except where noted.

No.	Title	Writer(s)	Length
1.	"What the Hell's Goin' On"		4:45
2.	"End of the World"		3:54
3.	"Don't Talk to Strangers"	Ron Elliott, Bob Durand	3:04
4.	"Let Me Rock"		3:55
5.	"She Loves Me"		2:35
6.	"I Want You Bad"	Terry Adams, Phil Crandon	2:55
7.	"Crazy Macy"		3:01
8.	"Lonely Hearts"		2:59
9.	"Just Like a Hurricane"		2:57
10.	"Fallen Star"		3:10
11.	"I'd Rather Spend My Time with You"		2:23
12.	"Cryin' Shame"		4:02

== Personnel ==
- Cyril Jordan, Chris Wilson - guitar, vocals
- George Alexander, Cyril Jordan, Steve Gomes, Alec Palao - bass guitar
- Victor Penalosa, Prairie Prince, Rob Stupka - drums
- J. Jaffe - lap steel, slide guitar
