= A Bucket of Brains =

Studio album by Flamin' Groovies
- Released: September 1995
- Recorded: May–August 1972
- Studios: Rockfield Studios, Monmouth, Wales; De Lane Lea Studios, London ("Tallahassee Lassie")
- Length: 28:45
- Label: EMI
- Producers: Dave Edmunds; Flowerboy Venus ("Tallahassee Lassie")

Flamin' Groovies chronology
Rock Juice (1993)	A Bucket of Brains (1995)	Fantastic Plastic (2017)

A Bucket of Brains is a studio EP/CD by Flamin' Groovies, primarily consisting of seven songs recorded by the group while living in England and recording for the British branch of United Artists Records ("UA") in 1972. The songs were intended to form the basis of the Groovies' fourth studio album, to be entitled A Bucket of Brains. Six of the songs (recorded in May and August 1972 at Rockfield Studios in Wales) were produced by Dave Edmunds, while the seventh (recorded in August 1972 at De Lane Lea Studios in London) was produced by Groovies' leader Cyril Jordan (using the pseudonym "Flowerboy Venus"). The eighth song on the album is the original "correct speed" studio version of the Groovies' most famous song, "Shake Some Action".

Although four of the songs were released on two singles by UA, their failure to chart caused UA to terminate the sessions (and the group's contract) at the end of 1972 without finishing the album, and the group returned to the U.S. before Christmas. However, the unissued recordings of two of those songs ("Shake Some Action" and "You Tore Me Down") later became the centerpiece of the Groovies' most successful album, Shake Some Action, in 1976.

An unofficial version of this album, entitled The Rockfield Session, was issued by the group's Australian record label, AIM Records, in 1989, with liner notes by Cyril Jordan. However, that EP was transcribed from a copy of the recordings owned by Jordan, did not use the original master recordings of the sessions, and was characterized as sounding "a bit muddy". EMI, which purchased UA in 1979, decided to release a legitimate version of the recordings, taken from the original masters, in 1995.

== Background ==
During most of the recording of Teenage Head in January 1971, Groovies' guitarist Tim Lynch was in jail; thus, almost all of the guitars on the album were performed by Cyril Jordan. After the album was finished, Jordan wanted to replace Lynch with guitarist James Ferrell, whom Jordan had met through fellow guitarist Mike Wilhelm. Band co-leader Roy Loney, who had originally started the band with Lynch, agreed but had become disenchanted with the music business. Then the band was dropped by its label, Kama Sutra Records, shortly before the release of Teenage Head over financial disputes. Soon thereafter, Loney also decided to leave the band and was replaced by Chris Wilson, the vocalist/guitarist from Wilhelm's band "Loose Gravel". However, the group now had no recording contract and also little money.

One of the Groovies' fans (to whom the Groovies included a dedication on Teenage Head) was Andrew Lauder, then head of the UA label in Britain. Groovies' bassist George Alexander had sent a letter to Lauder after the band's release by Kama Sutra, noting that they were looking for a new label. The Groovies were surprised when Lauder responded, telling them to meet with Martin Cerf, creative services director of United Artists Records in Los Angeles. Lauder had recently been successful in having Cerf and the American branch of United Artists sign several of his acts with prior major-label releases, including The Move / Electric Light Orchestra, Family, and Brinsley Schwarz, despite the fact that UA was generally downsizing. However, Cerf turned out to have no interest in signing the Groovies, telling Jordan, "You're through." Before leaving the UA offices, Jordan ran into another UA employee, an acquaintance who had managed Ike & Tina Turner, and Jordan told him about Lauder's message and Cerf's rejection. The acquaintance took Jordan into his office, and the two of them then called Lauder in London. As a result, two weeks later Jordan was in London, where Lauder and British UA told him that they could offer the Groovies a contract right then as long as the band temporarily moved to Britain, which Jordan agreed to do.

One of the reasons for moving the band was the opportunity to work with British musician/producer Dave Edmunds at Rockfield Studios; in Jordan's words, "“When we heard [Edmunds’ version of] ‘I Hear You Knockin'’ in 1969, the sound on the record was so great that we thought Rockfield was the new Sun recording studios." Lauder assured the band that this would be no problem since Edmunds already produced several acts for UA, and Jordan then discussed it in interviews about the group's signing to UA. However, no one from either the band or UA had contacted Edmunds, who read in the British music press (Melody Maker) that he was supposed to be producing the Groovies on the same day in May 1972 that the band arrived at Rockfield.

Because he lived nearby, Edmunds decided to show up to meet the Groovies and see if he actually wanted to work with them. The Groovies, knowing nothing about this, spent about three hours asking Edmunds questions about his own influences, one of which prompted the composition of a new Groovies song, "You Tore Me Down". By the end of this introduction, there was no doubt that the Groovies and Edmunds wanted to work together, and they promptly cut four songs: three originals, "Shake Some Action", "You Tore Me Down", and "Slow Death", and one Chuck Berry cover, "Little Queenie". However, the welcome given to an American group by a British label spurred a backlash in the U.K., despite the fact that the Groovies had been living in a leased house in London and touring constantly throughout Europe since arriving, and so UA decided instead to release a series of singles to introduce the band to the British audience. As a result, the Groovies returned to Rockfield in August to cut two more tracks, both covers: "Get a Shot of Rhythm and Blues" and "Married Woman". Due to other commitments, they then returned to London to cut one more cover, "Tallahassee Lassie", but Edmunds was unable to attend this session, so Jordan produced the track.

During this time, the Groovies came up with a name for their upcoming album, thought up by the group's road manager. Wilson noted that "Brains" was the name of a popular beer in South Wales, and after a particularly hard day of touring, the road manager had ordered "a bucket of Brains" at a local bar, and the name stuck. However, their first UA single, "Slow Death", was banned by the BBC for using the word "morphine" in the lyrics and so failed to chart in the U.K., which caused UA to lose interest in actually finishing the Groovies album. Prior to Christmas 1972, the Groovies were told by UA to return to the U.S. for the holidays, and UA would get back in touch following the new year, but the Groovies never heard from UA again. Jordan said that "I was at the same point as I was with Kama Sutra and Epic [the Groovies' prior major labels], let's get rid of these guys and get with someone else."

== Subsequent developments ==
Although Jordan and Wilson had pushed for "Shake Some Action" and "You Tore Me Down" to be issued as singles, those two originals, along with the cover "Little Queenie", were never issued at all by UA, and the Groovies ended up owning the master tapes to these three songs. UA had objected to "Shake Some Action" because of its almost five-minute length, and so Edmunds produced a version slightly speeding the song up and so making it almost 30 seconds shorter, but UA also turned this version down. Back in the U.S. in 1973, Jordan produced a version that was only about three-and-a-half minutes long, but that version was then also turned down by Capitol. In 1974, the Groovies allowed Greg Shaw's Bomp! Records to release the Rockfield version of "You Tore Me Down" as a single, and in 1975 Shaw was able to sign the group to Sire Records. Sire owner Seymour Stein, who loved Edmunds' production (including the "sped-up" version of "Shake Some Action"), acquired the rights to both originals from the band and released them on the Groovies' 1976 debut for Sire, which was also called Shake Some Action and was also produced by Edmunds.

In 1989, the Flamin' Groovies were recording for the Australian label AIM Records, when Jordan, pursuant to a 1987 conversation with Dave Edmunds during a Groovies tour, decided to allow AIM to release his copy, with some overdubs, of the 1972 Rockfield sessions as an EP, which was simply titled The Rockfield Sessions. According to the liner notes, one of Jordan's motives was trying to spur Edmunds to make an official release of the original UA masters. The official release of the seven master recordings on EMI followed on CD in 1995, including the "correct speed" original version of "Shake Some Action" as an extra track, moving the CD closer to album length instead of EP length.

When EMI was acquired by Universal Music Group in 2011, the European Commission required that the rights to most artists signed to the British branches of EMI labels (including UA) be divested by Universal Music Group. Despite the fact that Flamin' Groovies were an American band, they had been signed to UA's British branch, as discussed above, and so rights to this album were transferred in 2013 to the Parlophone division of Warner Music Group.

== Track listing ==
All tracks are written by Cyril Jordan and Chris Wilson except where noted.

No.	Title	Writer(s)	Length
1.	"Shake Some Action"		4:32
2.	"Tallahassee Lassie"	Frank Slay, Bob Crewe, Frederick Picariello	2:17
3.	"Married Woman"	Frankie Lee Sims	4:20
4.	"Get a Shot of Rhythm and Blues"	Terry Thompson	2:28
5.	"Slow Death"	Cyril Jordan, Roy Loney	4:22
6.	"You Tore Me Down"		2:49
7.	"Little Queenie"	Chuck Berry	2:59
8.	"Shake Some Action" (1995 Mixdown)		4:58

== Personnel ==
Flamin' Groovies

- Cyril Jordan - guitars, vocals, rhythm effects, mellotron on "Married Woman"
- Chris Wilson - lead vocals, percussion
- James Ferrell - guitars
- George Alexander - bass, vocals
- Danny Mihm - drums, percussion

with:

- Dave Edmunds - steel guitar on "Married Woman"; piano on "Little Queenie"; vocals on "Get a Shot of Rhythm and Blues"
