= Flamingo (Flamin' Groovies album) =

Studio album by The Flamin' Groovies
- Released: July 1970
- Recorded: March 1970
- Studio: Pacific High (San Francisco)
- Length: 38:02
- Label: Kama Sutra
- Producer: Richard Robinson

The Flamin' Groovies chronology
Supersnazz (1969)	Flamingo (1970)	Teenage Head (1971)

Professional ratings
Review scores
Source	Rating
AllMusic	4.5/5 stars
Christgau's Record Guide	B+
The New Rolling Stone Album Guide	3/5 stars

Flamingo is the second studio album by the rock band the Flamin' Groovies. It was released in 1970. Following the group's departure from the Epic record label, it was the first of their two albums for Kama Sutra Records.

== Critical reception ==
The A.V. Club wrote that Flamingo "is passionate, stripped-down revival music as it should be: It's riveting through and through, and brimming with a conviction contrary to the indulgences that marked San Francisco's music scene at the time."

== Track listing ==
All songs written by Cyril Jordan and Roy Loney except where noted.

Side 1

1. "Gonna Rock Tonight" (Loney)
2. "Comin' After Me"
3. "Headin' for the Texas Border"
4. "Sweet Roll Me on Down"
5. "Keep a Knockin'" (Richard Penniman)

Side 2

1. "Second Cousin" (Loney)
2. "Childhood's End" (Loney)
3. "Jailbait"
4. "She's Falling Apart" (Loney)
5. "Road House"

1995 Big Beat CD bonus tracks

1. "Walking the Dog" (Rufus Thomas)
2. "Somethin' Else" (Eddie Cochran, Sharon Sheeley)
3. "My Girl Josephine" (Dave Bartholomew, Fats Domino)
4. "Louie Louie" (Richard Berry)
5. Rockin' Pneumonia and the Boogie Woogie Flu" (Huey "Piano" Smith, John Vincent)
6. "Going Out Theme"

1999 Buddha CD bonus tracks

1. “My Girl Josephine" (Dave Bartholomew, Fats Domino)
2. "Around and Around"(Chuck Berry)
3. "Rockin' Pneumonia and the Boogie Woogie Flu” (Huey "Piano" Smith, John Vincent)
4. "Somethin' Else" (Eddie Cochran, Sharon Sheeley)
5. "Rumble" (Milton Grant, Link Wray)
6. "Going Out Theme"

== Personnel ==
Flamin' Groovies

- Roy Loney - vocals, guitar
- Cyril Jordan - guitar, vocals
- Tim Lynch - guitar, vocals
- George Alexander - bass guitar
- Danny Mihm - drums, percussion
- Commander Cody - piano
