= One Night Stand (Flamin' Groovies album) =

Studio album by the Flamin' Groovies
- Released: July 1987
- Recorded: July 28, 1986
- Studio: Glebe, Australia
- Genre: Power pop
- Label: ABC; AIM (Australia)
- Producer: Cyril Jordan

The Flamin' Groovies chronology
Jumpin' in the Night (1979)	One Night Stand (1987)	Step Up (1991)

Professional ratings
Review scores
Source	Rating
AllMusic	3/5 stars

One Night Stand is an album by the Flamin' Groovies. It was released in 1987 and produced by Cyril Jordan, who also provided the cover art. The album was recorded "live in the studio" in a single night in Australia during a "grueling" tour of Australia, Japan and Europe.

== Track listing ==
1. "Kicks" (Barry Mann, Cynthia Weil) (2:31)
2. "Bittersweet" (Dave Faulkner) (3:41)
3. "I Can't Hide" (Cyril Jordan, Chris Wilson) (3:47)
4. "Money" (Berry Gordy, Janie Bradford) (2:56)
5. "Call Me Lightning" (Pete Townshend) (3:27)
6. "Shake Some Action" (Cyril Jordan, Chris Wilson) (4:35)
7. "Slow Death" (Cyril Jordan, Roy Loney) (5:02)
8. "Teenage Head" (Cyril Jordan, Roy Loney) (3:37)
9. "Slow Down" (Larry Williams) (2:51)
10. "Tallahassee Lassie" (Frank Slay, Bob Crewe, Freddy Picariello) (2:24)

Bonus tracks

1. "Way Over My Head" (Cyril Jordan) (3:15)
2. "Shakin'" (Cyril Jordan) (3:34)

Additional bonus tracks

1. "You Tore Me Down" (Cyril Jordan, Chris Wilson) (2:47)
2. "A Million Miles Away" (live) (Peter Case, Joey Alkes, Chris Fradkin) (4:01)
3. "Somebody's Fool" (live) (Cyril Jordan) (3:00)

== Personnel ==
- Cyril Jordan - guitar, vocals
- George Alexander - bass, vocals
- Jack Johnson - guitar, vocals
- Paul Zahl - drums
