= Rock Juice =

Studio album by Flamin' Groovies
- Released: September 28, 1993
- Genre: Power pop
- Label: National Records
- Producer: Cyril Jordan, Karl Derfler

Flamin' Groovies chronology
Step Up (1991)	Rock Juice (1993)	A Bucket of Brains (1995)

Rock Juice is the eighth studio album by the Flamin' Groovies, released in September 1993 and produced by Cyril Jordan, who also provided the cover art, and Karl Derfler. The album was completed by Jordan and Groovies' bassist George Alexander after the group's breakup in 1991, and they are the only musicians credited in the liner notes (albeit only for vocals).

Alexander later said that the originals had been recorded with prior members Jack Johnson (guitar), Paul Zahl (drums), and Bobby Ronco (vocals) prior to the breakup, but that all of their vocals were edited out of the final mix; the three covers were recorded later. Versions of eight of these songs (which include those vocals) appear on the compilation album Step Up, which was released by the Groovies' then-label, AIM Records (Australia), after their 1991 breakup.

Rock Juice was the last new recording recorded and released by the original incarnation of the Flamin' Groovies, although the group's incomplete and cancelled fourth album (A Bucket of Brains) was issued in 1995. However, after the band reformed in 2013, a ninth studio album (Fantastic Plastic) was released in 2017.

== Track listing ==
All tracks written by Cyril Jordan except where noted

1. "Way Over My Head" (2:51)
2. "Sealed with a Kiss" (Peter Udell, Gary Geld) (2:26)
3. "Hold on Me" (3:45)
4. "Somebody's Fool" (2:23)
5. "Stay Away" (3:42)
6. "I'm Only What You Want Me to Be" (2:46)
7. "Shakin'" (4:01)
8. "Give It Away (4:00)
9. "Thanks John" (2:32)
10. "This Could Be the Night" (Phil Spector, Harry Nilsson) (3:08)
11. "Ainsley's Song (3:27)
12. "Little Girl" (2:58)
13. "When She's in Town" (2:16)
14. "Flyin' Saucers Rock & Roll" (Ray Scott) (2:00)

== Personnel ==
Flamin' Groovies

- Cyril Jordan - guitar, bass, vocals
- George Alexander - bass, vocals
- Others (uncredited)
