= Supersnazz =

Studio album by Flamin' Groovies
- Released: September 1969
- Recorded: 1968
- Studios: CBS Studio A, Los Angeles, California
- Genres: Rock and roll; proto-punk; New Orleans R&B; country; ragtime
- Length: 35:17
- Label: Epic
- Producer: Steve R. Goldman

Flamin' Groovies chronology
Supersnazz (1969)	Flamingo (1970)

Supersnazz is the debut studio album by the rock band Flamin' Groovies. It was released in 1969 on the Epic label. The release was their only album recorded expressly for a major record label, although all of their next five albums were distributed by major labels. Supersnazz was later released in compact disc format in 2000 on Sundazed Music with four edits of songs from the album (done in 1969 for singles) included as bonus tracks.

== Critical Reception ==
Professional ratings
Review scores
Source	Rating
AllMusic	4.5/5 stars
Robert Christgau	A
Classic Rock	3/5 stars
The Encyclopedia of Popular Music	3/5 stars
The Great Rock Discography	6/10
MusicHound Rock	2.5/5 stars
Record Collector	3/5 stars
Rolling Stone	favourable
The Rolling Stone Album Guide	3/5 stars
Tom Hull	A+

Bruce Eder of AllMusic described the album as proto-punk and suggested that the Ramones probably wore out copies of the album. Robert Christgau originally gave the album a lukewarm review with a B+ grade, but later revisited it in 2013 and gave it an A, especially praising "Laurie Did It". Tom Hull gave the album an A+ and included it on his list "1,000 Albums for a Long and Happy Life".

== Track listing ==
Side One
No.	Title	Writer(s)	Length
1.	"Love Have Mercy"	Loney	4:30
2.	"The Girl Can't Help It"	Bobby Troup	3:29
3.	"Laurie Did It"	Loney	3:51
4.	"A Part from That"	Loney, Jordan	1:59
5.	"Rockin' Pneumonia and the Boogie Woogie Flu"	Huey "Piano" Smith, Johnny Vincent	2:42

Side Two
No.	Title	Writer(s)	Length
1.	"The First One's Free"	Loney	3:40
2.	"Pagan Rachel"	Loney	1:55
3.	"Somethin' Else / Pistol Packin' Mama"	Eddie Cochran, Sharon Sheeley, Bob Cochran / Al Dexter	3:45
4.	"Brushfire"	Loney, Jordan	3:18
5.	"Bam Balam"	Loney, Jordan	1:50
6.	"Around the Corner"	Loney, Jordan	4:09
Total length:			35:17

2000 Sundazed CD bonus tracks
No.	Title	Writer(s)	Length
1.	"Rockin' Pneumonia and the Boogie Woogie Flu" (Single Edit)	Huey "Piano" Smith, Johnny Vincent	2:36
2.	"The First One's Free" (Single Edit)	Loney	3:37
3.	"Somethin' Else" (Single Edit)	Eddie Cochran, Sharon Sheeley, Bob Cochran	2:06
4.	"Laurie Did It" (Single Edit)	Loney	3:47
Total length:			46:43

== Personnel ==
Flamin' Groovies

- Roy Loney - rhythm guitar, vocals
- Cyril Jordan - guitar, vocals
- Tim Lynch - guitar, vocals, harmonica
- George Alexander - bass guitar, vocals, harmonica
- Danny Mihm - drums, percussion
- Mike Lang - keyboards
