= Dan Healy (soundman) =

American audio engineer

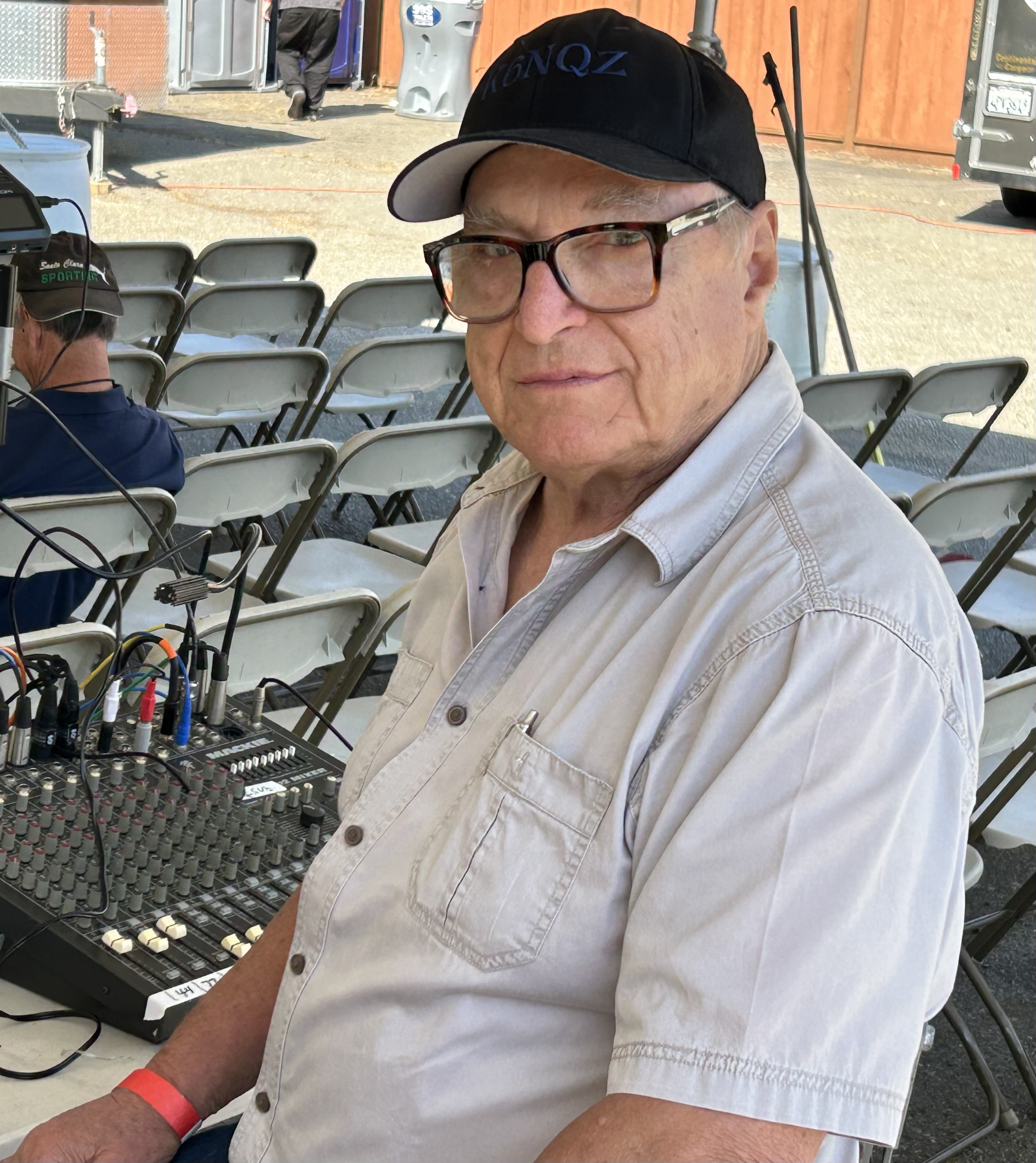

Background information
- Born: May 16, 1945 (age 80)
- Origin: Weott, California
- Genres: Rock
- Occupation: Audio engineer

Dan Healy is an audio engineer who often worked with the American rock band the Grateful Dead. He succeeded Alembic and Owsley "Bear" Stanley as the group's chief sound man after the Wall Of Sound in 1974 and subsequent band hiatus through 1975. A favorite amongst Deadheads for many years, he helped to introduce a tapers section at Grateful Dead concert to allow audience recording of live concerts. Healy would often provide direct output from the soundboard for the tapers to directly patch into their recorders.

He was a pioneer in rock sound system innovation, and helped Bear along with Ron Wickersham of Alembic design the Dead's "Wall of Sound" concert sound system. He also helped perfect the ultra-matrix soundboard setup which was used by the Dead from 1986 through 1990. The setup mixed together audience feed with the soundboard feed to create a more dynamic, realistic concert sound. Some fans and collectors of the band's live recordings deem this setup to be the band's best-sounding, and most practical.

Healy has also undertaken record production duties on occasion, such as when he produced the 1960s San Francisco psychedelic band The Charlatans' eponymous debut album. He is listed as co-producer and engineer on Mother Earth's debut album Living with the Animals (1968), and also produced albums for the Sir Douglas Quintet, Harvey Mandel, Dr. John, and Quicksilver Messenger Service. Healy was also the bass player for Hoffman's Bicycle (later Bycycle) that played the Bay Area for 18 months from the Summer of 1968.
