= Mike Wilhelm =

Mike Wilhelm may refer to:

- Mike Wilhelm (musician) (1942–2019), American guitarist, singer and songwriter
- Mike Wilhelm (basketball) (born 1966/67), American basketball coach
