= Fantastic Plastic =

Fantastic Plastic may refer to:

- Fantastic Plastic Records, an independent record label
- Fantastic Plastic (album), a 2017 album by The Flamin' Groovies
- Fantastic Plastics (band), a two-piece, Neo-New Wave band based in New York City
