= Flamin' Groovies Now =

Studio album by the Flamin' Groovies
- Released: September 1978
- Recorded: 1978
- Studios: Rockfield, Wales
- Label: Sire
- Producer: Dave Edmunds

The Flamin' Groovies chronology
Shake Some Action (1976)	Flamin' Groovies Now (1978)	Jumpin' in the Night (1979)

Flamin' Groovies Now is a studio album by the Flamin' Groovies, released in 1978. It was produced by Dave Edmunds, and marked a resurgence of the San Francisco band. The band supported the album with a lengthy UK tour.

== Critical reception ==
Professional ratings
Review scores
Source	Rating
AllMusic	4/5 stars
Christgau's Record Guide	B−

The Lincoln Journal Star deemed the band "punks without the posture."

== Track listing ==
All tracks are written by Cyril Jordan and Chris Wilson except where noted.

No.	Title	Writer(s)	Length
1.	"I'll Feel a Whole Lot Better"	Gene Clark	2:27
2.	"Between the Lines"		4:15
3.	"Ups and Downs"	Mark Lindsay, Terry Melcher	3:07
4.	"Move It"	Ian Samwell	2:57
5.	"Take Me Back"		2:50
6.	"Reminiscing"	King Curtis	2:04
7.	"Good Laugh Mun"	Jordan, Wilson, Dave Edmunds	2:54
8.	"Yeah My Baby"	Jordan, Wilson, Edmunds	3:55
9.	"House of Blue Lights"	Don Raye, Freddie Slack	2:19
10.	"Blue Turns to Grey"	Mick Jagger, Keith Richards	2:29
11.	"Paint It Black"	Jagger-Richards	3:05
12.	"All I Wanted"		3:03
13.	"Don't Put Me On"		4:12
14.	"There's a Place"	Lennon-McCartney	1:50

== Personnel ==
- Cyril Jordan – guitar, vocals, mellotron
- Chris Wilson – guitar, vocals, harpsichord, percussion
- Mike Wilhelm – guitar
- George Alexander – bass, vocals, percussion
- David Wright – drums, percussion
- Dave Edmunds – piano, guitar on 5; piano, vocals on 8
