= Step Up (Flamin' Groovies album) =

Studio album by Flamin' Groovies
- Released: August 1991
- Recorded: California, 1984–89
- Genre: Power pop
- Label: AIM Records (Australia)
- Producer: Cyril Jordan

Flamin' Groovies chronology
One Night Stand (1987)	Step Up (1991)	Rock Juice (1993)

Step Up is a compilation album of in-studio demos recorded by the Flamin' Groovies in the San Francisco Bay Area between 1984 and 1989 and released in 1991. The demos were produced by Cyril Jordan and engineered and mixed by Karl Derfler, and the album was released shortly after the band broke up. However, after the breakup, eight of the 13 songs were reworked and remixed by Jordan and Derfler, along with removing all lead and backing vocals except for those by Jordan and Groovies' bassist George Alexander, and were then ultimately issued on the Groovies' eighth studio album Rock Juice in 1993.

Of the 13 songs on Step Up, 11 are Cyril Jordan originals; the two exceptions are "In the Land of the Few", a 1969 song performed and co-written by Dave Edmunds (who produced the Groovies between 1972–78), and "Milk Cow Blues" by Kokomo Arnold.

== Track listing ==
All songs written by, and all lead vocals by, Cyril Jordan except as noted.

1. "She's Got a Hold on Me" (3:48)
2. "Step Up" (3:20) (lead vocal: Bobby)
3. "Way Over My Head" (2:55)
4. "Thanks John" (2:35) (vocals: Cyril, Bobby, George, Jack)
5. "Little Girl" (3:00)
6. "Nineteen Eighty-Four" (3:00) (lead vocal: Bobby)
7. "Searching" (1:48)
8. "Give It Away" (4:05)
9. "I'm Only What You Want Me to Be" (2:49) (lead vocal: Cyril and Bobby)
10. "Way Down Under" (3:32)
11. "In the Land of the Few" (Mike Finesilver, Peter Ker, Dave Edmunds) (3:51) (lead vocal: Bobby with Cyril)
12. "Milk Cow Blues" (Kokomo Arnold) (4:01)
13. "Can't Stay Away from You" (3:07) (lead vocal: Jack)

== Personnel ==
Flamin' Groovies

- Cyril Jordan - guitars, lead and backing vocals
- George Alexander - bass, vocals
- Jack Johnson - guitar, lead and backing vocals
- Bobby Ronco - lead and backing vocals
- Paul Zahl - drums

with:

- John Mader - additional drums
