= Shake Some Action =

Studio album by Flamin' Groovies
- Released: June 1976
- Recorded: 1972–1976
- Studios: Rockfield Studios, Monmouth, South Wales
- Genres: Rock and roll; power pop
- Length: 35:56
- Label: Sire
- Producer: Dave Edmunds

Flamin' Groovies chronology
Teenage Head (1971)	Shake Some Action (1976)	Flamin' Groovies Now (1978)

Shake Some Action is the fourth studio album by American rock band the Flamin' Groovies. The album was released in June 1976 by Sire Records. The title Shake Some Action originates from a line in the 1965 film None but the Brave.

== Background and recording ==
Shake Some Action was the first album by the newly reconstituted version of the Flamin' Groovies, who had returned from a five-year hiatus during which lead singer Roy Loney departed the band, leaving guitarist Cyril Jordan as its de facto leader. During that period, the Groovies had released three singles, all recorded in 1972 while the band was living in the UK, under contract to United Artists Records, and being produced by Dave Edmunds. Two of the songs from those sessions (the title track and "You Tore Me Down") eventually ended up on this album. The band drastically reshaped their musical style, stripping down the blues and rockabilly influences of their previous work in favor of a more retro, guitar-oriented power pop style emulating that of the 1960s British Invasion scene. The new band took to wearing velvet-collared three-piece suits and Cuban heels in an attempt to recreate the fashion sense of the era. In an interview with ZigZag magazine, Jordan stated that the band "just wanted to get back to the flash of that era, which were the best years, as far as I'm concerned."

== Release and reception ==
Professional ratings
Review scores
Source	Rating
AllMusic	5/5 stars
The Encyclopedia of Popular Music	4/5 stars
Pitchfork	8.5/10
Rolling Stone	4/5 stars
The Rolling Stone Album Guide	3.5/5 stars
The Village Voice	B

In a contemporary review of Shake Some Action, Robert Christgau of The Village Voice felt that the Flamin' Groovies, without Roy Loney and having remodelled themselves as "an English pop-revival band", now "get their kicks playing dumb", and that while the album contained good songs, "only cultists will ever hear them." In the United States, Shake Some Action reached number 142 on the Billboard albums chart. The album was released to a much greater reception in the United Kingdom, then in the early stages of the punk era. Newly based in England, the reformed Flamin' Groovies found itself aligned with the burgeoning punk scene, along with the likes of bands such as the Ramones and the Sex Pistols.

Retrospectively, Ian S. Port of San Francisco Weekly states that Shake Some Action "influenced the rise of power pop and punk in America, and remains a vital document of that era." In a retrospective review of the album, Mark Deming of AllMusic opined that "if Shake Some Action was the first salvo from the new and improved Flamin' Groovies, it also demonstrated that this edition of the band had as much promise as the Loney-fronted group," calling the title track "a brilliant evocation of the adventurous side of British rock circa 1966 ... [which] by its lonesome served as a superb justification for The Groovies' new creative direction." Joe Tangari of Pitchfork wrote that Shake Some Action "is in every sense both a comeback and a re-invention, and it's been rightly championed by collectors and critics extolling its effortless pop perfection."

In 2014, the title track was one of the ten selected by Greil Marcus for his book The History of Rock 'n' Roll in Ten Songs:

In "Shake Some Action" everything is new, as if the secret [of rock 'n roll] had been discovered and the mystery solved on the spot...It's what the singer is afraid of losing defined now purely in the positive, as flight, as freedom, in Norman Mailer's words loose in the water for the first time in your life, because no matter how many times in how many pieces of music you are swept away as the instrumental passages in "Shake Some Action" can sweep you away, it's always the first time.

== Track listing ==
All tracks are written by Cyril Jordan and Chris Wilson, except where noted.

No.	Title	Writer(s)	Length
1.	"Shake Some Action"		4:34
2.	"Sometimes"	Thomasson	2:21
3.	"Yes, It's True"		2:29
4.	"St. Louis Blues"	W. C. Handy	2:39
5.	"You Tore Me Down"		2:50
6.	"Please Please Girl"		2:04
7.	"Let the Boy Rock 'n' Roll"	Joe Butler, John Sebastian	2:18
8.	"Don't You Lie to Me"	Hudson Whittaker, Chuck Berry	2:27
9.	"She Said Yeah"	Roddy Jackson, Sonny Christy	1:38
10.	"I'll Cry Alone"		2:15
11.	"Misery"	John Lennon, Paul McCartney	1:39
12.	"I Saw Her"	Jordan, Mike Wilhelm, George Hunter	2:41
13.	"Teenage Confidential"		2:45
14.	"I Can't Hide"		3:12

== Personnel ==
Flamin' Groovies

- Cyril Jordan – guitar, vocals
- Chris Wilson – vocals, guitar
- James Ferrell – guitar
- George Alexander – bass
- David Wright – drums
- Danny Mihm – drums on 1, 5

== Cover versions ==
The title song was covered by Cracker for the soundtrack to the 1995 film Clueless. The Newtown Neurotics live album Kickstarting a Backfiring Nation features “Shake Some Action” redone as “Take Strike Action.”.

Yo La Tengo performed "You Tore Me Down" on their album Fakebook.

The Hitmen have a recorded live version of the song on their compilation album Dancing Time '78-'79. The take is from Live at The Local Inn, Ryde, September 1979.

Michael Monroe recorded "Shake Some Action" on his first solo album, Nights Are So Long, released in 1987.

== Charts ==
Chart performance for Shake Some Action
Chart (2026)	Peak position
Croatian International Albums (HDU)	5
