= The Charlatans (American band) =

American folk/psychedelic rock band

- The Charlatans in 1965; From left to right: George Hunter, Richard Olsen, Mike Wilhelm, Dan Hicks, and Mike Ferguson

Background information
- Origin: San Francisco, California, U.S.
- Genres: Folk rock; psychedelic rock; acid rock; blues
- Years active: 1964–1969; 1997; 2005; 2015
- Labels: Kapp; Philips
- Past members: George Hunter; Richard Olsen; Mike Wilhelm; Mike Ferguson; Dan Hicks; Sam Linde; Patrick Gogerty; Terry Wilson; Darrell DeVore

The Charlatans were an American folk rock and psychedelic rock band that played a role in the development of the San Francisco Haight-Ashbury music scene during the 1960s. They are often cited by critics as being the first group to play in the style that became known as the San Francisco Sound.

Exhibiting more pronounced jug band, country and blues influences than many bands from the same scene, the Charlatans' rebellious attitude and distinctive late 19th-century fashions exerted a strong influence on the Summer of Love in San Francisco. The band's recorded output was small. Following difficulties with various record labels, their only album, The Charlatans, was recorded and released by a reconstituted lineup (with only two members of the original group) in 1969.

Original drummer Dan Hicks went on to form Dan Hicks & His Hot Licks, a more commercially successful ensemble that amalgamated elements of country, folk and jazz in a predominantly acoustic setting. Guitarist Mike Wilhelm later joined the Flamin' Groovies.

== Early years: 1964–1965 ==
Formed in mid-1964 by amateur avant-garde musician George Hunter and music major Richard Olsen, the earliest lineup of the Charlatans featured Hunter on autoharp and vocals, and Olsen on bass and vocals, along with Mike Wilhelm (lead guitar, vocals), Mike Ferguson (piano/keyboards, vocals), and Sam Linde (drums). Linde's drumming was felt to be substandard by the rest of the band and he was soon replaced by Dan Hicks, who also contributed vocals to the group.

The Charlatans were known for clothing themselves in late 19th-century attire, as if they were Victorian dandies or Wild West gunslingers. This unconventional choice of clothing was influential on the emerging hippie counter-culture, with many young San Franciscans dressing in similarly late Victorian and early Edwardian era clothing.

In June 1965, the Charlatans began a six-week residency at the Red Dog Saloon in Virginia City, Nevada, just across the border from Northern California. During this stint at the Red Dog, band members Ferguson and Hunter designed and produced a rock concert poster in advance of the residency to promote the band's performances. This poster, known as "The Seed", is widely regarded by critics as the first psychedelic concert poster. (Note: There were, in fact, two "Seed" posters, which look almost identical. They are differentiated by their dates. The first lists the band as playing between June 1 and 15, while the second states "Opening June 21".) By the end of the decade, psychedelic concert-poster artwork by artists such as Wes Wilson, Rick Griffin, Stanley Mouse, Carol Alexander, Alton Kelley, and Victor Moscoso had become a mainstay of San Francisco's music scene.

Another reason that the Charlatans' stay at the Red Dog is regarded by critics and historians as significant is that, immediately before their first performance at the club, the band members took LSD. As a result, the Charlatans are sometimes called the first acid rock band, although their sound is not representative of the feedback-drenched, improvisational music that would later come to define the sub-genre.

The Charlatans returned to San Francisco at the end of summer 1965 and, in September, were given the chance to audition for Autumn Records, a label headed by local DJ, Tom "Big Daddy" Donahue. Autumn didn't sign the band, partly due to conflicts between the group and Donahue over suitable material and partly due to lack of money; the label was on the verge of bankruptcy and was sold to Warner Bros. Records early the following year.

== Later years: 1966–1969 ==
The failed Autumn Records audition proved to be only a minor setback, with the Charlatans signing with Kama Sutra Records in early 1966. As home to the Lovin' Spoonful, one of the earliest folk rock bands to find international success, the group thought the label would be the ideal home for their music. However, after the band had recorded a number of songs and chosen to issue "Codine" as their debut single, the record company vetoed the release, citing the song's drug connotations. In fact, the tune—penned by folk artist Buffy Sainte-Marie—spoke of the dangers of drugs, rather than promoting their use, but Kama Sutra was adamant and refused to release the song.

Instead, two other songs from the Kama Sutra sessions, "The Shadow Knows" and "32-20", were released by Kapp Records in 1966 as the band's first single, with some copies being housed in a rare promotional-only picture sleeve. Kapp Records failed to adequately promote the release and, as a result, the single was commercially unsuccessful. The remaining songs recorded during the Kama Sutra sessions for the Charlatans' debut album remained unreleased until they were officially issued for the first time by Big Beat Records in 1996, on The Amazing Charlatans album.

Ferguson was fired from the Charlatans in 1967 and replaced by Patrick Gogerty. Additionally, Terry Wilson was brought in to take over as drummer after Dan Hicks switched to rhythm guitar, enabling him to sing his own compositions as a front man for the group. Hicks eventually left the group in 1968 to form his own band, Dan Hicks & His Hot Licks, and Gogerty was subsequently fired from the band.

Tensions between Hunter and the rest of the group escalated throughout 1968, until Wilhelm, Olsen and Wilson decided to disband the group, reforming soon afterward, without inviting Hunter back into the band. The Charlatans recruited new member Darrell DeVore (piano/keyboards, vocals) and soon secured a recording contract with Philips Records. The band released one album with Philips in 1969, titled simply The Charlatans. Author and critic Richie Unterberger has speculated that the album's commercial failure was due to the personnel changes having diluted some of the energy of the original line-up and their sound being somewhat outdated by 1969.

== Breakup and reunions ==
Following the release of The Charlatans, Wilson was forced to leave the band in order to begin serving a prison sentence for marijuana possession. The original quintet of Hunter, Olsen, Wilhelm, Ferguson and Hicks reunited briefly during the summer of 1969, but by the end of the year, the Charlatans had broken up once more.

After the breakup, Wilhelm went on to front the band Loose Gravel from 1969 until 1976, before becoming a member of the Flamin' Groovies during the late 1970s and early 1980s. Olsen became a producer and a manager at Pacific High Studios and some time later formed the swing group Richard Olsen & His Big Band. Hunter founded the Globe Propaganda design company and his artwork appeared on many LP covers, including Happy Trails (Quicksilver Messenger Service), Hallelujah (Canned Heat), and It's a Beautiful Day (It's a Beautiful Day). Ferguson joined Lynne Hughes, a barmaid from the Red Dog Saloon, in the band Tongue and Groove.

In 1996, a documentary was released entitled The Life and Times of the Red Dog Saloon (also known as Rockin' at the Red Dog: The Dawn of Psychedelic Rock), in which the surviving members of the Charlatans (Ferguson died in 1979 from complications from diabetes) were interviewed about their days at the Red Dog. The following year, the Charlatans rehearsed for a series of secret gigs at the legendary Sweetwater club in Mill Valley, followed by a series of reunion performances at The Fillmore. The latter-day line-up of the band, composed of Hunter, Hicks, Wilhelm, and Olsen, were not heard from again until 2005, when they performed an abbreviated set at a memorial concert for Family Dog founder Chet Helms in Golden Gate Park. The foursome returned to Golden Gate Park on September 2, 2007 performing at the Summer of Love 40th Anniversary concert (the show also featured a set from Dan Hicks & His Hot Licks).

On June 20 and 21, 2015, the foursome reunited for the final time, presenting their first full sets since 1997 for their 50th anniversary concerts. For this celebration, the band returned to the Red Dog Saloon in Virginia City.

Dan Hicks died from throat and liver cancer at his home in Mill Valley, California on February 6, 2016. Mike Wilhelm died on May 14, 2019.

Despite their lackluster and commercially unsuccessful recording career, the Charlatans hold the distinction of being the first of the underground San Francisco bands of the 1960s.

== Discography ==
=== Studio album ===
- The Charlatans (1969)

=== Live album ===
- Playing in the Hall (2015)

=== Compilations ===
- The Amazing Charlatans (1996)
- The Limit of the Marvelous (2016)

=== Unofficial compilations ===
- The Charlatans (1979, released as a limited edition picture disc)
- The Autumn Demos – August 1965 (1982)
- Alabama Bound (1983)
- The Charlatans/Alabama Bound (1992)

=== Singles ===
- "The Shadow Knows"/"32-20" (1966)
- "High Coin"/"When I Go Sailin' By" (1969)
