= The Amazing Charlatans =

Compilation album by The Charlatans
- Released: September 1996
- Recorded: August 1965 – early 1968
- Genre: Folk rock, psychedelic rock
- Length: 67:29
- Label: Big Beat

The Amazing Charlatans is a compilation album by the American psychedelic rock band the Charlatans that was released in 1996 by Big Beat Records. The album is a collection of demos, tracks that appeared on singles, and previously unreleased sessions that the band recorded between August 1965 and early 1968, at a variety of different San Francisco studios.

All but four of the tracks featured on the album were previously unreleased, although a number of them had appeared on unofficial or bootleg albums over the years. The tracks on the album that had been officially released before were "The Shadow Knows" and "32–20", which had both been issued on a 1966 single, "Codine Blues", which had first appeared as "Codine" on the 1985 Rhino Records' compilation, Nuggets, Volume 7: Early San Francisco, and "Number One", which had appeared on the 1986 compilation, The Autumn Records Story.

The tracks on the album originate from four recording dates: an August 1965 demo session for Autumn Records, a recording session for Kama Sutra Records in early 1966, a July 1967 demo session, and an early 1968 studio session. The final track on the album is a radio commercial for Groom N' Clean hair preparation, recorded in November 1966. It features the band playing their signature song, "Alabama Bound", with alternate lyrics outlining the merits of Groom N' Clean.

== Track listing ==
1. "Codine Blues" (Buffy Sainte-Marie) – 2:22
2. "Alabama Bound" (traditional, arranged Mike Ferguson, Dan Hicks, George Hunter, Richard Olsen, Mike Wilhelm) – 6:24
3. "I Always Wanted a Girl Like You" (George Hunter, Richard Olsen) – 1:31
4. "I Saw Her" (traditional, arranged Mike Ferguson, Dan Hicks, George Hunter, Richard Olsen, Mike Wilhelm) – 2:06
5. "How Can I Miss You When You Won't Go Away" (Dan Hicks) – 2:22
6. "32–20" (Robert Johnson) – 2:27
7. "We're Not on the Same Trip" (Dan Hicks) – 3:12
8. "Walkin'" (George Hunter, Richard Olsen) – 3:08
9. "Sweet Sue, Just You" (Will Harris, Victor Young) – 3:40
10. "East Virginia" (traditional, arranged Patrick Gogerty, Dan Hicks, George Hunter, Richard Olsen, Mike Wilhelm, Terry Wilson) – 1:40
11. "The Shadow Knows" (Jerry Leiber, Mike Stoller) – 2:14
12. "I Got Mine" (Dan Hicks) – 2:27
13. "Steppin' in Society" (Alex Gerber, Harry Akst) – 1:14
14. "Devil Got My Man" (Skip James) – 2:46
15. "By Hook or by Crook" (Dan Hicks) – 2:24
16. "'Long Come a Viper" (Dan Hicks) – 2:41
17. "Sidetrack" (traditional, arranged Mike Ferguson, Dan Hicks, Lynne Hughes, George Hunter, Richard Olsen, Mike Wilhelm) – 2:26
18. "Alabama Bound" (traditional, arranged Mike Ferguson, Dan Hicks, George Hunter, Richard Olsen, Mike Wilhelm) – 2:45
19. "Number One" (Mike Wilhelm) – 4:15
20. "Baby Won't You Tell Me" (John Hammond) – 3:41
21. "Jack of Diamonds" (traditional, arranged Mike Ferguson, Dan Hicks, George Hunter, Richard Olsen, Mike Wilhelm) – 4:49
22. "The Blues Ain't Nothin'" (Mike Wilhelm) – 4:58
23. "Groom N' Clean Ad" (traditional, arranged Mike Ferguson, Dan Hicks, George Hunter, Richard Olsen, Mike Wilhelm) – 0:40
