= The Charlatans (1969 album) =

Studio album by the Charlatans
- Released: 1969
- Recorded: 1969
- Studio: Pacific High, San Francisco, CA
- Genre: Blues; swing; rock and roll; pop; psychedelic rock
- Length: 41:28
- Label: Philips Records
- Producer: Dan Healy; The Charlatans

Professional ratings
Review scores
Source	Rating
Allmusic	4/5 stars

The Charlatans is the self-titled debut album by the San Francisco psychedelic rock band the Charlatans, and was released by Philips Records in 1969.

== History and recording ==
Between 1965 and 1967, the Charlatans were an influential, but commercially unsuccessful, folk rock and blues band that have been widely credited by critics as having started the Haight-Ashbury psychedelic scene in San Francisco.

In 1969, the band signed a recording contract with Philips Records, although their lineup had changed considerably from their 1965 – 1967 heyday. The version of the band that recorded The Charlatans consisted of original members Mike Wilhelm (lead guitar, vocals) and Richard Olsen (bass), with Terry Wilson (drums) and Darrell DeVore (piano/keyboards, vocals) having been recruited in order to flesh out the band, prior to the recording of the album.

The Charlatans was recorded at Pacific High Studios in San Francisco, with production and engineering by Dan Healy and the band.

== Reception ==
The Charlatans was a critical and commercial flop upon its release. Although the record was the Charlatans' debut album, it was recorded and released relatively late in the band's career, a factor which critic Richie Unterberger has suggested contributed to its commercial failure. Critics have also suggested that a contributing factor to the album's lack of success was that the band's sound had become somewhat outdated by 1969, with their brand of jug band blues and gentle psychedelia being largely eschewed by the public in favor of a heavier rock sound. In his book, The Summer of Love: The Inside Story of LSD, Rock & Roll, Free Love and High Times in the Wild West, author Joel Selvin describes the album as "an unenthusiastic coda to a misspent career."

Other reviewers have been kinder towards the album, with critic Bruce Eder noting that the album "is a rather gorgeous and gently challenging piece of San Francisco rock, incorporating elements of blues and big-band swing, as well as '50s rock & roll and elegant '60s pop."

A single taken from the album, coupling the Van Dyke Parks-penned song, "High Coin", with "When I Go Sailin' By", was released by Philips Records in 1969, but this too was a commercial failure. Disillusioned by the album's lack of success, the Charlatans had broken up by the end of 1969.

== Reissues ==
The Charlatans has been reissued on CD three times to date. Firstly, in 1992 by Eva Records as an unofficial (or bootleg) CD, where it was coupled with another unofficial Charlatans' album, a compilation of unreleased recordings titled Alabama Bound. The second reissue was on One Way Records in 1995 and included two bonus tracks, "The Shadow Knows" and "32-20", both of which had been released on the Charlatans' debut single in 1966. The third reissue of the album was released under the title San Francisco 1969 by Acadia Records in 2004 and was digitally remastered from the original master tapes. The Acadia release also included a 1969 Philips Records' radio advertisement for the album as a bonus track.

== Track listing ==
=== Side 1 ===
1. "High Coin" (Van Dyke Parks) – 3:07
2. "Easy When I'm Dead" (Darrell DeVore) – 2:38
3. "Ain’t Got the Time" (Mike Wilhelm) – 2:47
4. "Folsom Prison Blues" (Johnny Cash) – 2:47
5. "The Blues Ain't Nothin'" (Mike Wilhelm) – 4:44
6. "Time to Get Straight" (Darrell DeVore) – 3:53

=== Side 2 ===
1. "When I Go Sailin' By" (Richard Olsen) – 2:46
2. "Doubtful Waltz" (Darrell DeVore) – 3:24
3. "Wabash Cannonball" (Alvin Pleasant Carter) – 4:04
4. "Alabama Bound" (traditional, arranged The Charlatans) – 6:53
5. "When the Movies Are Over" (Darrell DeVore) – 3:04

=== 1995 CD reissue bonus tracks ===
12. "The Shadow Knows" (Jerry Leiber, Mike Stoller) – 2:06
13. "32-20" (traditional, arranged The Charlatans) – 2:28

=== 2004 CD reissue bonus tracks ===
12. "Radio Advert" – 1:00

== Personnel ==
- Mike Wilhelm - Vocals, Guitar, Fretted instruments, Percussion
- Richard Olsen - Vocals, Bass, Woodwind instruments, Percussion
- Darrell DeVore – Vocals, Piano/Keyboards, Bass, Percussion
- Terry Wilson – Drums, Percussion
