= Jumpin' in the Night =

Studio album by the Flamin' Groovies
- Released: 1979
- Recorded: Eden and Advision, London, England
- Label: Sire
- Producers: Cyril Jordan, Roger Bechirian

The Flamin' Groovies chronology
Flamin' Groovies Now (1978)	Jumpin' in the Night (1979)	One Night Stand (1987)

Jumpin' in the Night is the sixth studio album by American rock band the Flamin' Groovies, released in 1979. It was produced by Cyril Jordan and Roger Bechirian.

== Critical reception ==
Professional ratings
Review scores
Source	Rating
AllMusic	3.5/5 stars
MusicHound Rock: The Essential Album Guide	3.5/5 stars
Music Week	2/4 stars
The Rolling Stone Album Guide	3/5 stars

The Runcorn Weekly News noted that "to capture the full flavour of insistent R&B the record should be heard on a little Dansette mono record player—turned up loud." The Montreal Star wrote that "the Groovies pack all the incendiary power of the early Stones."

== Track listing ==
All tracks are written by Cyril Jordan and Chris Wilson except where noted.

No.	Title	Writer(s)	Length
1.	"Jumpin' in the Night"		3:21
2.	"Next One Crying"		2:34
3.	"First Plane Home"		3:48
4.	"In the U.S.A."		3:16
5.	"Down Down Down"	Trevor Burton	2:47
6.	"Yes I Am"		2:36
7.	"Werewolves of London"	Warren Zevon, Waddy Wachtel, LeRoy Marinell	3:33
8.	"It Won't Be Wrong"	Roger McGuinn, Harvey Gerst	1:55
9.	"Please Please Me""	Lennon-McCartney with additional credit by Cyril Jordan and Chris Wilson	1:58
10.	"Tell Me Again"		1:57
11.	"Absolutely Sweet Marie"	Bob Dylan	3:11
12.	"5D"	Roger McGuinn	2:38
13.	"Lady Friend"	David Crosby	2:31

== Personnel ==
- Cyril Jordan – guitar, vocals
- Chris Wilson – guitar, vocals
- Mike Wilhelm – guitar
- George Alexander – bass
- David Wright – drums
