= Pacific High Recording =

Independent recording studio in San Francisco

Coordinates: 37.77264°N 122.42042°W

Pacific High Recorders
- Industry: Recording studio
- Founded: 1968; 58 years ago in Sausalito, US
- Defunct: 1971
- Successor: Alembic Studios; His Masters Wheels
- Headquarters: San Francisco, United States

Pacific High Recording (also referred to as Pacific High Studios) was an independent recording studio in San Francisco. Founded in 1968, the studio was used by many artists representing the San Francisco sound and was used by Sly and the Family Stone, the Grateful Dead, The Charlatans, Quicksilver Messenger Service, and Van Morrison.

== History ==
=== Pacific High Studios ===
The studios were established in 1968 in Sausalito, before Peter Weston moved the studio into a former plastics factory at 60 Brady Street in San Francisco, just off Market Street and only a few blocks from Fillmore West.

The studio was affiliated with Apostolic Recording Studio in New York City, operating as Apostolic's West Coast counterpart. Like Apostolic, Pacific High initially utilized a Scully 1" 12-track tape recorder, making it the first 12-track studio on the West Coast.

Sly and the Family Stone recorded their album Life at the studio in 1968, and returned the following year to record its follow-up, Stand!, which would mark the height of the band's artistic and commercial success.

The Grateful Dead recorded their third studio album at Pacific High, only to re-record the entire album at another new Bay Area studio, the similarly named Pacific Recorders, where the band moved to take advantage of one of the studio's new Ampex MM 1000, one of the first 16-track recorders available anywhere. The band returned to Pacific High in 1970 to record Workingman's Dead.

The Charlatans recorded their self-titled debut album at Pacific High, with the band's bass player eventually managing the studio. Country Joe and the Fish recorded Here We Are Again at the studio the same year. Music critic and Rolling Stone co-founder Ralph Gleason brought Quicksilver Messenger Service to the Brady Street studio to record a few tracks and mix their album Shady Grove. According to legend, Quicksilver Messenger Service spent 400 hours at Pacific High - to record just one album.

In 1970, Jefferson Airplane recorded their song "Mexico" at the studio. Pacific High had a large, 50-foot by 60-foot main room with a stage at one end, and that stage became the setting for Ralph Gleason's Go Ride The Music documentary centered on the band that aired on the National Educational Television network (now known as PBS). The same year, Paul Kantner and other members of Jefferson Airplane recorded Blows Against the Empire at the studio, with the album co-credited to Kantner and Jefferson Starship. Also recorded at Pacific High that year was Essra Mohawk's critically acclaimed album, Primordial Lovers.

Thomas Buckner and the Ghost Opera ensemble recorded at Pacific High, and other notable projects recorded at the studio included the Joy of Cooking's self-titled album and Commander Cody and His Lost Planet Airmen's album Lost in the Ozone, the Allen Ginsberg Project's Pacific High Studio Mantras featured Pemchekov Warwick and the Kailas Shugendo Mantric Sun Band, credited as "Reverend Adjari and Buddhist Chorus."

=== Alembic ===
In 1971, Alembic took over Pacific High and extensively redesigned the recording studio space under the direction of former Pacific Recorders technical director Ron Wickersham. The live room, now 50 feet wide by 38 feet deep with a 14 to 16 foot high ceiling, was the largest in the Bay Area, big enough to record a full orchestra. Alembic also established a retail store for selling their instruments.

San Francisco disc jockey Tom Donahue utilized the studio's stage for his popular "KSAN Live Weekend" radio broadcasts, including performances by the Doobie Brothers, Elvin Bishop, Clifton Chenier, Dr. Hook, Loose Gravel (featuring former Charlatan Mike Wilhelm), and Jerry Garcia. The live performances in front of an audience of 200-300 people were recorded by Phill Sawyer in quadraphonic sound.

In 1973, Alembic decided to focus on manufacturing electric guitars and basses, and sold the recording studio to Elliot Mazer.

=== His Masters Wheels ===
Mazer, who had most recently been working with artists like Neil Young as co-owner of Quad Studios Nashville, utilized the studio to complement his remote truck, renaming it His Masters Wheels after the mobile studio in 1974. Leaving Alembic's remodel intact, Mazer installed his Neve 8016 mixing console with Neve Melbourne sidecar, along with two Ampex MM1000 tape machines, various outboard gear and microphones.

In 1977, Journey, who had recorded Next at the studio, chose to record their follow-up, Infinity, at His Masters Wheels, with Roy Thomas Baker producing what would be the band's first album with vocalist Steve Perry. At some point in the recording sessions, Baker sprayed everyone in the control room with a fire extinguisher, soaking the Neve mixing console in the process. The resulting fallout between Mazer and Baker led to the band finishing the album at Cherokee Studios.

In the studio's most active years, notable projects recorded at His Masters Wheels included Frankie Miller's The Rock (1975), Barclay James Harvest's Time Honoured Ghosts (1975), The Tubes' Now (1977), David Grisman Quintet's Hot Dawg (1978) and Rory Gallagher's Notes from San Francisco (2011). Mazer stopped maintaining the studio in 1978 and later moved his offices to Fantasy Studios. His Masters Wheels ceased existing as a studio.
