= Mike Wilhelm (musician) =

American musical artist (1942–2019)

- Born: Michael Ray Wilhelm; March 18, 1942; Los Angeles, California
- Died: May 14, 2019 (aged 77) San Francisco, California, U.S.
- Genres: Folk rock, psychedelic rock, rock, blues
- Occupations: Musician, songwriter
- Instruments: Guitar, harmonica
- Years active: 1964–2019
- Labels: Kapp, Philips, Sire
- Formerly of: The Charlatans, Loose Gravel, The Flamin' Groovies

Michael Ray Wilhelm (March 18, 1942 – May 14, 2019) was an American guitarist, singer and songwriter, best known as a founding member of the influential Bay Area band the Charlatans, who have been widely credited as starting the Haight-Ashbury psychedelic scene during the 1960s. He later played with the bands Loose Gravel and the Flamin' Groovies.

== Early life and the Charlatans ==
Wilhelm was born in Los Angeles on March 18, 1942, and first learned to play blues guitar in his teens, from the Tennessee bluesman Walter "Brownie" McGhee. He served for a short time in the U.S. Navy before starting his professional music career as an opening act for the Chambers Brothers.

In 1964, Wilhelm became a founding member of the Charlatans. The band's music had more pronounced jug band, country and blues influences than many other Bay Area groups, while their distinctive late 19th-century fashions exerted a strong influence on the Summer of Love in San Francisco. The Charlatans' recorded output was small, with their one and only studio album, The Charlatans, appearing in 1969, two years after the band's 1965–1967 heyday. Despite being influential on the San Francisco counter-culture scene during the late 1960s, the Charlatans never managed to break into the national Billboard charts and broke up at the end of 1969.

During the 1960s, when the photographer Herb Green asked Jerry Garcia who his favorite guitarist was, Garcia responded "Mike Wilhelm" without hesitation.

A version of Buffy St. Marie's "Codine", recorded by The Charlatans in 1966, was used in the movie Boys Don't Cry during Hilary Swank's sex change scene. The song's guitar solo, one of Wilhelm's favorites, was deleted from the movie soundtrack and the Charlatans had to sue the director of the film to receive royalties.

== Loose Gravel and the Flamin' Groovies ==
After the Charlatans disbanded, Wilhelm formed a trio called Loose Gravel in the early 1970s. Wilhelm famously gave Bill Graham "the finger" in the movie Fillmore, when Graham refused to let Loose Gravel perform in the film. Graham liked the scene where Mike gave him the finger so much that he left it in the movie. Loose Gravel only released one single during their existence, but there have been several subsequent issues of material.

After Loose Gravel broke up, Wilhelm spent six years as lead guitarist with the Flamin' Groovies and toured Europe and elsewhere with the band. He played on two of the Flamin' Groovies studio albums, Flamin' Groovies Now (1978) and Jumpin' in the Night (1979). Both albums were reissued as part of the Groovies' three-CD set, Bust Out at Full Speed: The Sire Years.

== Later career ==
Wilhelm also released several solo albums, including Wilhelm, Wood & Wire, and Mean Ol' Frisco. The latter album featured musical contributions from original Charlatans member Richard Olsen, ex-members of Quicksilver Messenger Service John Cipollina and Greg Elmore, and songs by harmonica player and photographer Sandy Guy Schoenfeld. Wilhelm, Cipollina, Schoenfeld, and Eric Rhein from the Mean 'Ol Frisco album sessions can all be seen in the 1988 film '68 as musicians playing a 1960s-style free concert in the park. In 1987, Wilhelm performed with Schoenfeld as a duo at the San Francisco Harmonic Convergence Festival and two weeks later with members of the Bay Area Supergroup Dinosaurs, at the 20th Anniversary of the Summer of Love concert in San Francisco's Golden Gate Park. In addition, Wilhelm also participated in the recording of the as yet unreleased Austin Sessions album with Freddie Steady Krc.

In the mid-1990s, Wilhelm was involved in the remixing of unreleased demos and recording sessions by his old band the Charlatans for Big Beat Records' The Amazing Charlatans CD. This remixing work for the album was largely done during his spare time, when he was not roofing his house. In 2005, Wilhelm was involved in a reunion of the Charlatans for a performance at a memorial concert for Family Dog founder Chet Helms in Golden Gate Park. The band reformed again, two years later, for a free concert commemorating the 40th Anniversary of the Summer of Love in San Francisco.

Wilhelm later performed with the Bottle Rock Blues & Rhythm Band in Lake County, California, where he lived with his wife, Ana Maria, their cat, Felix and dog, Boogity.

== Selected album discography ==
=== The Charlatans ===
- The Charlatans (1969)
- The Amazing Charlatans (1996)

=== Loose Gravel ===
- Frisco Band b/w Waiting in Line (45) (1975)
- Loose Gravel EP (1982)

=== The Flamin' Groovies ===
- Flamin' Groovies Now (1978)
- Jumpin' in the Night (1979)
- The Goldstar Tapes (1983)

=== Mike Wilhelm ===
- Wilhelm (1976)
- Mean Ol' Frisco (1985)
- Wood & Wire (1993)
- Live in Tokyo: At Grateful Dead Land (1997)
- Junko Partner (2002)
- Live at the Cactus (2007)
