= Teenage Head (Flamin' Groovies album) =

Studio album by The Flamin' Groovies
- Released: March 1971
- Recorded: January 1971
- Studio: Bell Sound (New York City)
- Genre: Garage rock; rock and roll
- Length: 30:45
- Label: Kama Sutra
- Producer: Richard Robinson

Flamin' Groovies chronology
| Flamingo (1970) | Teenage Head (1971) | Shake Some Action (1976) |

Professional ratings
Review scores
| Source | Rating |
|---|---|
| AllMusic | 4.5/5 stars |
| Alternative Press | 4/5 |
| The Austin Chronicle | 5/5 stars |
| Chicago Tribune | 4/4 stars |
| Christgau's Record Guide | B |
| Entertainment Weekly | B+ |
| Q | 4/5 stars |
| The Rolling Stone Album Guide | 4/5 stars |
| Spin | 9/10 |
| Uncut | 4/5 stars |

Teenage Head is the third studio album by the San Francisco rock band Flamin' Groovies, released in March 1971 by Kama Sutra Records.

Released the same year as the Rolling Stones' album Sticky Fingers, Mick Jagger reportedly noticed the similarities between the albums and thought the Flamin' Groovies did the better take on the theme of classic blues and rock 'n roll revisited in a modern context.

The album was also included in the book 1001 Albums You Must Hear Before You Die.

== Track listing ==
All songs written by Cyril Jordan and Roy A. Loney except where noted.

Side 1

1. "High Flyin' Baby"
2. "City Lights"
3. "Have You Seen My Baby?" (Randy Newman)
4. "Yesterday's Numbers"

Side 2

5. "Teenage Head"
6. "32-20" (Robert Johnson, new lyrics by Roy A. Loney)
7. "Evil Hearted Ada" (Loney)
8. "Doctor Boogie"
9. "Whiskey Woman"

=== CD bonus tracks ===
10. "Shakin' All Over" (Johnny Kidd, Guy Robinson)
11. "That'll Be the Day" (Jerry Allison, Buddy Holly, Norman Petty)
12. "Louie Louie" (Richard Berry)
13. "Walkin' the Dog" (Rufus Thomas)
14. "Scratch My Back" (Slim Harpo)
15. "Carol" (Chuck Berry)
16. "Going Out Theme"

== Personnel ==
Flamin' Groovies

- Cyril Jordan – guitar, vocals
- Roy Loney – vocals, guitar
- Tim Lynch – guitar, harmonica
- George Alexander – bass guitar
- Danny Mihm – drums
- Jim Dickinson – piano
