= Roy Loney =

American rock musician (1946–2019)

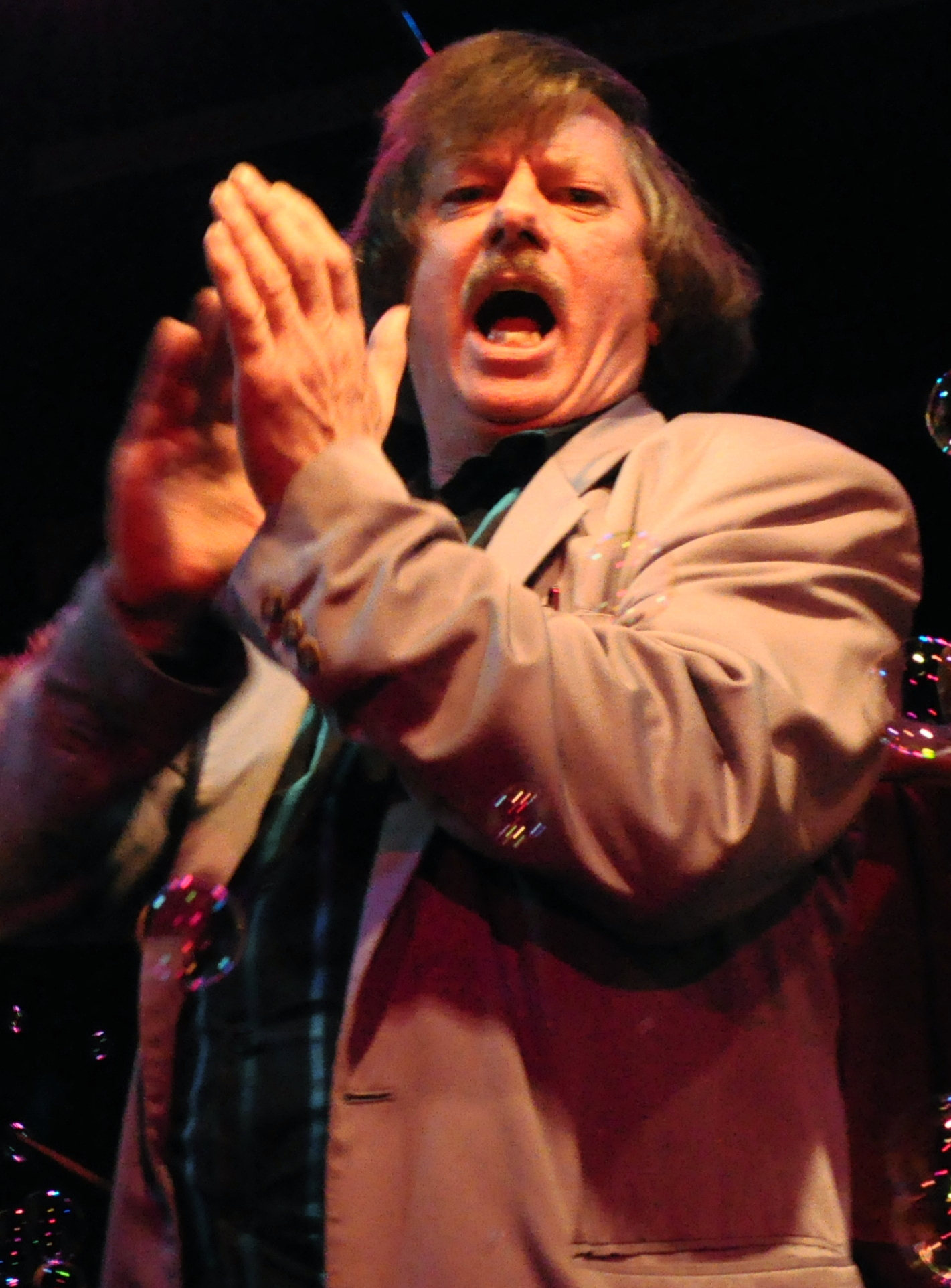
Roy Loney, 2009

Roy Loney (April 13, 1946 – December 13, 2019) was an American rock musician, best known as the original lead singer of the Flamin' Groovies. The Groovies original line-up issued releases on Epic Records and Kama Sutra Records, which Rolling Stone magazine described as an "influence on power-pop and punk ..." Loney's albums with the Flamin' Groovies included Sneakers (EP), Supersnazz, Flamingo, and Teenage Head. Billboard magazine contrasted their "gritty" sound to the "flower power" approach of their San Francisco contemporaries.

After leaving the Flamin' Groovies, Loney remained in the music industry both as a performer and in other jobs such as a sales representative for ABC Records and in various San Francisco-area record stores. Besides solo projects, he fronted bands, often in collaboration with former Flamin' Groovies bandmates, performing and recording under band names including the Phantom Movers and the Longshots (which included Scott McCaughey, Jim Sangster, and Tad Hutchinson of the Young Fresh Fellows, and Joey Kline of The Squirrels). In the last two years of his life, Loney appeared with a reunited Flamin' Groovies. Before his health failed in early 2019, he had expected to tour Europe with them later that year.

He died at the age of 73 on December 13, 2019, due to "severe organ failure."

== Discography ==
Full-length LPs or CDs unless otherwise noted.

With the Flamin' Groovies:

- Sneakers (EP; Snazz R-2371, 1968)
- Supersnazz (Epic BN-26487, September 1969)
- Flamingo (Kama Sutra KSBS 2021, July 1970)
- Teenage Head (Kama Sutra KSBS 2031, April 1971)
- (plus various singles, see Flamin' Groovies)

Other:

- Roy A. Loney – ..Artistic As Hell.. (EP; label given as A-F, "Produced by Roy A. Loney for Albertson Frost Productions", 1978)
- Roy Loney and the Phantom Movers (hereafter just "Phantom Movers") – Out After Dark (Solid Smoke Records – SS-9001, 1979)
- Phantom Movers – "Return To Sender"/"Neat Petite" (12" single, Solid Smoke, 1979)
- Phantom Movers – Phantom Tracks (Solid Smoke 9002, 1980)
- Phantom Movers – "Hanky Panky"/"With A Girl Like You" (12" single, Solid Smoke, 1989)
- Phantom Movers – Contents Under Pressure (War Bride 9003, 1981)
- Phantom Movers song "Different Kind" appeared on various artists recording Rising Stars Of San Francisco (War Bride 9005, 1981)
- Phantom Movers – Rock'n'Roll Dance Party (War Bride 9006/Rockhouse LPL 8203, 1982)
- Phantom Movers – "Lana Lee"/"Magdalena"/"Goodnight Alcatraz"(45 RPM single, Rockhouse, 1982)
- Phantom Movers – Fast and Loose (Double Dare Productions DD-701 / Lolita 5017, 1983)
- Phantom Movers – "Beware Of The Ghoul"/"Down The Road Apiece" (45 RPM single, Lolita, 1983)
- Roy Loney – Live (Lolita 5018, 1984)
- Phantom Movers – The Scientific Bombs Away!!! (Norton Records 209, 1988)
- Phantom Movers – Five or Six by Five Live (EP, Norton EP-010, 1991)
- Phantom Movers cover of "With a Girl Like You" appeared on various artists recording Groin Thunder: Trogg Noize from Around the World (Dog Meat – DOG 026, 1992)
- Roy Loney and the A-Bones – Boy Meets Bones (EP, Norton EP-019, 1993)
- Roy Loney and the Longshots (hereafter just "Longshots") – Action Shots! (Marilyn USMLP 1024, 1993)
- Longshots – Full Grown Head (Shake/Cargo SAL-210, 1994)
- Longshots "Long Shots Theme" and "Get Off The Phone" appeared on various artists recording The Beat Goes On... (Shake The Record Label, 1994)
- Longshots "Teeny Weeny Man" appeared on various artists recording Hodge! Podge! Barrage! From Japan!! Volume 2: Trash Compilation (1 + 2 Records – 1+2 CD 052, 1994)
- Longshots – Kick Out The Hammmmons (Impossible Records IMP 037, 1995)
- Roy Loney & The Young Fresh Fellows: "I Couldn't Spell !!*@!" appeared on various artists recording Turban Renewal: A Tribute To Sam The Sham (Norton ED-234, 1996)
- Longshots – Record Party (Rock & Roll Inc. Records R&R-INC 714, 1998)
