= Chris Wilson (American musician) =

American rock musician (born 1952)

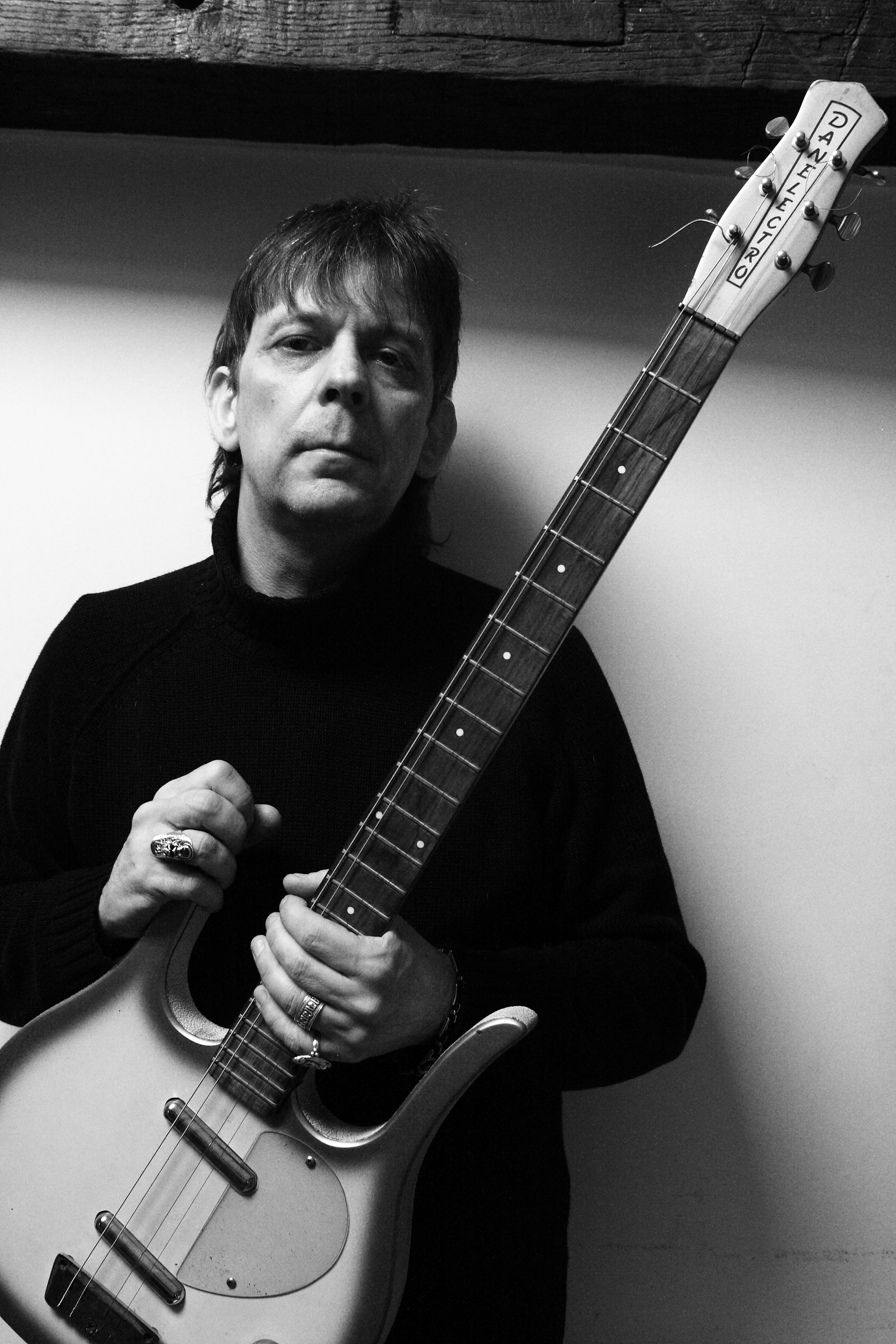

Background information
- Born: September 10, 1952 (age 73); Waltham, Massachusetts, U.S.
- Genres: Rock
- Occupation: Musician
- Instruments: Guitar, vocals
- Label: Sire
- Formerly of: The Flamin' Groovies, The Barracudas
- Partner: Lori Christian (2014–present)

Chris Wilson (born September 10, 1952) is an American guitarist and singer, most known for his role as the lead singer of the San Francisco band the Flamin' Groovies, having replaced original singer Roy Loney in 1971. With Wilson on lead vocals, the band released their influential 1976 album Shake Some Action.

His song "Shake Some Action", co-written with Cyril Jordan, appeared in the 1995 movie Clueless.

He was also a long-term member of The Barracudas and in 1993 he released the mini-album Pop backed by The Sneetches and the debut solo album Random Centuries.

He released his second solo album, Second Life, with various session musicians, including Greg Paulett on drums, in 2008. His third solo album released in 2013, It’s Flamin' Groovy, was the impetus for the Flamin' Groovies reunion that same year. The album featured former bandmates Cyril Jordan, Roy Loney, Michael Wilhelm, George Alexander, and James Ferrell.

The reunited Flamin' Groovies, Chris Wilson, Cyril Jordan and George Alexander with new drummer Victor Penalosa, toured the world from 2013 until 2017 and released an album, Fantastic Plastic, in 2017.

Wilson returned to the United States in 2014 where he presently lives. He retired at the end of 2018.
