= Cyril Jordan =

- Born: Cyril Henrygarwick Jordan; August 31, 1948 (age 77); San Francisco, California, U.S.
- Genres: Rock
- Occupation(s): Musician, songwriter
- Instrument(s): Guitar, vocals

Cyril Jordan (born August 31, 1948 in San Francisco) is an American guitarist and founding member of San Francisco band the Flamin' Groovies. Jordan founded the band in 1965, playing with them until they initially disbanded in 1992.

His song "Shake Some Action", co-written with Chris Wilson, appeared in the 1995 movie Clueless.

After the death of George Harrison in 2001, Jordan performed a tribute with a band known as the New Moondogs at a special charity event at CD Land in Palo Alto, California. Jordan also backed up Gordon Waller (of Peter and Gordon) at the same venue a few months later.

Jordan designed many of the earliest Flamin' Groovies handbills and has subsequently worked as an artist and illustrator.

In 2013, the Flamin' Groovies, including Jordan, Chris Wilson, George Alexander, and new member Victor Penalosa, reformed to play dates in Japan, Australia, the UK, and the United States. He continues to tour and record with the band.
