= Summer Jam at Watkins Glen =

1973 rock festival in New York state, US

- Genre: Jam band music, rock music
- Dates: July 28, 1973
- Location: Watkins Glen Grand Prix Raceway outside of Watkins Glen, New York
- Years active: 1973
- Founders: Shelly Finkel, Jim Koplik
- Attendance: 600,000
- Website: Photographs of Summer Jam at Watkins Glen

The Summer Jam at Watkins Glen was a July 1973 rock festival outside Watkins Glen, New York, that featured the Allman Brothers Band, the Grateful Dead and the Band. The event for many years held the Guinness Book of World Records entry for "largest audience at a pop festival," with an estimated 600,000 fans in attendance at the Watkins Glen Grand Prix Raceway. Approximately 150,000 tickets were purchased in advance, the rest being admitted in what became a "free concert".

== History ==
The concert was produced by Shelly Finkel and Jim Koplik, two promoters who had organized a successful Grateful Dead concert at Dillon Stadium, Hartford, Connecticut, in 1972. At that show the Grateful Dead were joined on-stage by Dickey Betts, Berry Oakley, and Jai Johanny Johanson, members of the Allman Brothers Band. This impromptu jam planted the seeds that would eventually spawn the "Summer Jam" concert in Watkins Glen, New York.

Similar to the 1969 Woodstock Festival, an enormous traffic jam created chaos for those who attempted to make it to the concert site. Country roads forced fans to abandon their vehicles up to 20 miles away from the concert. 150,000 tickets were sold for $10 each, but for all the other people it was a free concert.

Also similar to Woodstock, there were no reports of violence at Watkins Glen. However, the day was marred by the death of Willard Smith, 35, a skydiver from Syracuse, New York. One of the flares he dived with ignited his body suit, and he was engulfed in flames. Smith's body was eventually found in the woods near the concert site. There is also the unsolved disappearance of two high school teenagers (Mitchel Weiser and Bonnie Bickwit) from Brooklyn who were hitchhiking to the concert.

Many historians claimed that the Watkins Glen event was the largest gathering of people in the history of the United States. In essence, that meant that on July 28, one out of every 350 people living in America at the time was listening to the sounds of rock at the New York state racetrack. Considering that most of those who attended the event hailed from the Northeast, and that the average age of those present was approximately seventeen to twenty-four, close to one out of every three young people from Boston to New York was at the festival.

Summer Jam was the last concert event to be held at Watkins Glen International until 2011, when the rock band Phish organized and performed at a three-day festival, called Super Ball IX, at the complex.

== Production ==
Bill Graham's FM Productions provided lights, staging and a 50,000-watt sound system. The sound system introduced a new concept: digital delay lines to compensate for the speed of sound in air, so that speaker towers could be placed at intervals from the stage to allow distant audience members to hear clearly. New Jersey electronics company Eventide brought three digital delay units each capable of 200 milliseconds of delay. Four speaker towers were placed 200 feet (60 m) from the stage, their signal delayed 175 ms to compensate for the speed of sound between the main stage speakers and the delay towers. Six more speaker towers were placed 400 feet from the stage, requiring 350 ms of delay, and a further six towers were placed 600 feet away from the stage, fed with 525 ms of delay, the audio signal coming through all three modules. The most distant audience areas were unable to see the stage because of terrain, but they could hear the concert. Each Eventide DDL 1745 module contained many 1000-bit shift register integrated chips, and cost the same as a new car. The concept meant that the people in the front were not blasted with too much sound in an attempt to reach the back, and the people in the back enjoyed high fidelity sound. The system worked very well.

This concert was attended by 600,000 people – about a third more than the Woodstock festival in August 1969. Due to the crowd's enormous size additional broadcast towers were set up, but this required more amplification power. At this time the Grateful Dead only used amplifiers made by McIntosh Laboratory. Alembic sound engineer Jim Furman (later Janet Furman) was dispatched by helicopter with $6,000 cash to nearby Binghamton to obtain five additional 600-watt MC 2300 models, their most powerful amp at that time. Furman located the company owner, bought the amps off the factory floor, and flew back to the festival site, with the overloaded helicopter narrowly avoiding catastrophe.

== Performance ==
Although the concert was scheduled to start on July 28, thousands of music fans were already at the concert site on the 27th. Robbie Robertson of the Band requested to do a soundcheck, but was perplexed that so many people were sitting in front of the stage. Bill Graham allowed the soundcheck with the crowd of people in front, and the Band ran through a few numbers to the delight of the audience. The Allman Brothers Band did their soundcheck next, playing "One Way Out" and "Ramblin' Man". The Grateful Dead's soundcheck turned into a two-set marathon, featuring their familiar tunes such as "Sugaree", "Tennessee Jed" and "Wharf Rat". They also performed a unique jam that was eventually included on their retrospective CD box set So Many Roads (1965-1995).

On July 28, the day of the concert, 600,000 music fans had arrived in Watkins Glen. Grateful Dead performed first, playing two long sets. They opened with "Bertha" and played many favorite tunes such as "Box Of Rain", "Jack Straw", "Playing in the Band", "China Cat Sunflower" and "Eyes of the World".

The Band followed the Dead with one two-hour set. However, their set was cut in half by a drenching thunderstorm; in a scene again reminiscent of Woodstock, people were covered with mud. During the storm, keyboardist Garth Hudson performed his signature organ improvisation "The Genetic Method"; when the rain finally let up, the full Band joined Hudson on stage, and segued into their signature song "Chest Fever".

Finally, the Allman Brothers Band performed for three hours. Their performance included songs from their soon-to-be-released album Brothers and Sisters, along with their standards "In Memory of Elizabeth Reed", "Statesboro Blues", "Les Brers in A Minor" and "Whipping Post".

Following the Allmans' second set, there was an hour encore jam featuring musicians from all three bands. The jam featured spirited renditions of "Not Fade Away", "Mountain Jam", and "Johnny B. Goode".

== Discography ==
- The Allman Brothers Band — Wipe the Windows, Check the Oil, Dollar Gas (Capricorn Records, 1976). "Come And Go Blues" was recorded on July 28.
- The Band — Live at Watkins Glen (Capitol Records, 1995). Purported to be a 10-song excerpt from their set, only two tracks - an impromptu organ solo during a rain delay by Garth Hudson and a jam session - are from the festival. The rest are either studio cuts with overdubbed crowd sounds or performances from other shows, including one cut from the Woodstock Festival in 1969.
- Grateful Dead — So Many Roads (1965–1995) (Arista Records, 1999). This 5-disc box set includes an 18-minute jam performed as part of the Dead's sound check the day before the concert.

== See also ==
- List of jam band music festivals
- List of historic rock festivals
