= McIntosh MC-2300 =

American power amplifier

The McIntosh MC-2300 is a solid-state power amplifier which was built by the American high-end audio company McIntosh Laboratory between 1971 and 1980.

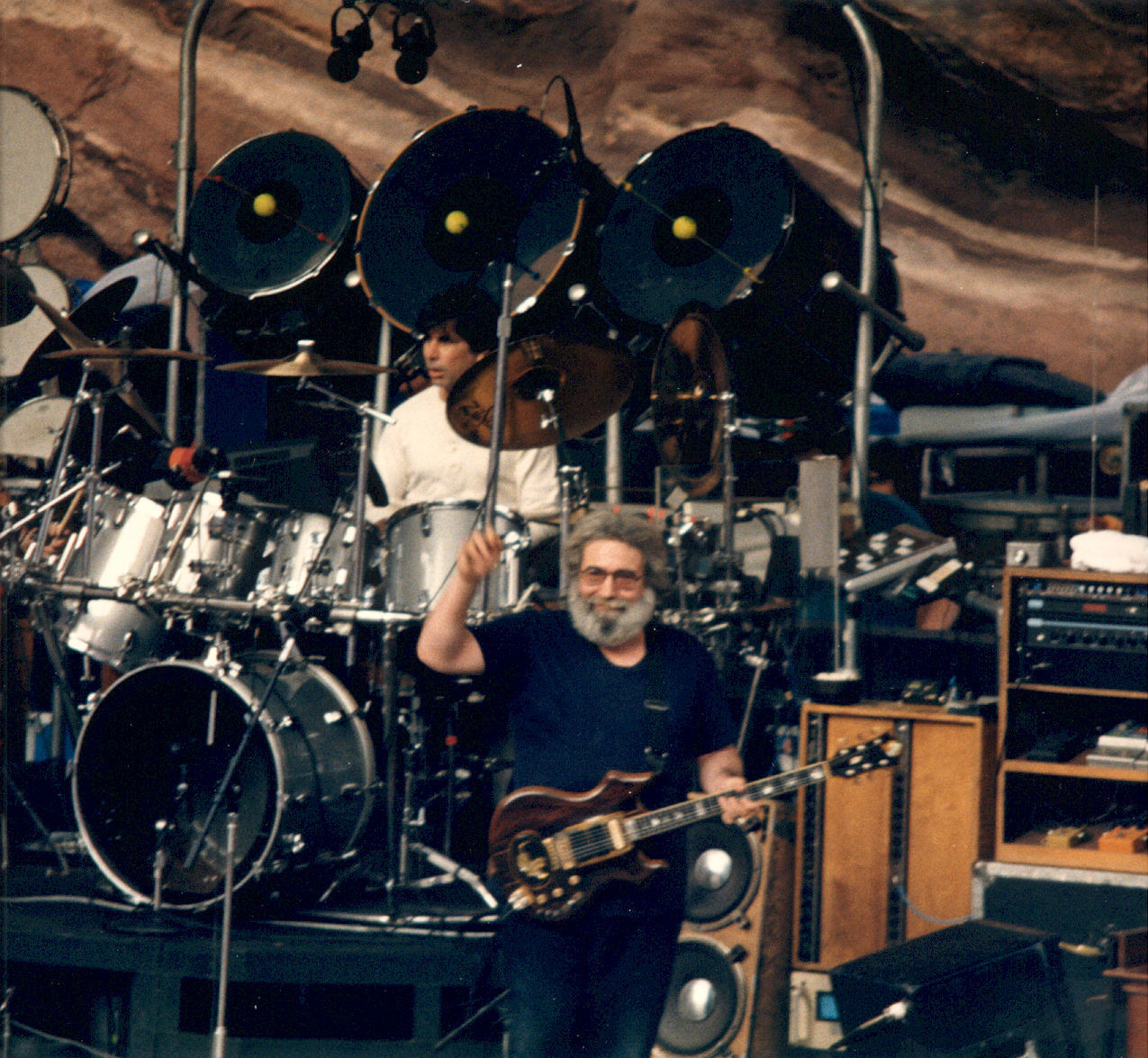
Jerry Garcia playing Tiger in 1987 through a MC-2300 in the lower-right corner of the picture

McIntosh produced the MC-2105 (with blue meters) and the MC-2100 (without) between 1969 and 1977. Both 100 watt-per-channel stereo amps (200 watts monophonic) sold. The MC-2300 was succeeded by the more powerful MC-2500 (500 WPC stereo/1000 watts mono), sold from 1980 to 1990; and then the MC-2600 (600 WPC stereo/1200 watts mono), which was available from 1990 to 1995.

In October 2021 The Jim Irsay Collection acquired Jerry Garcia's MC-2300 Budman which sold again in March 2026.

== Design ==
Physically, the MC-2300 is a relatively large amplifier, measuring 10.5 in (26.7 cm) high x 19 in (48.3 cm) wide x 17 in (43.2 cm) deep, and weighing 128 lbs (58 kg). During its production run, 4545 units were made. Today, the MC-2300 remains a sought-after amplifier for audiophiles and collectors.

The MC-2300 can be utilized either as a 300-watt-per-channel stereo amp, or a 600-watt monoblock, and was rated by its manufacturer as being able to produce this amount of power continuously, with very little (less than 0.25%) distortion. McIntosh's ratings were conservative, however, because like many of their amplifiers, when bench-tested the MC-2300 has frequently been found to produce an even higher level of clean power. As such, it was ideal for use in demanding, professional applications.

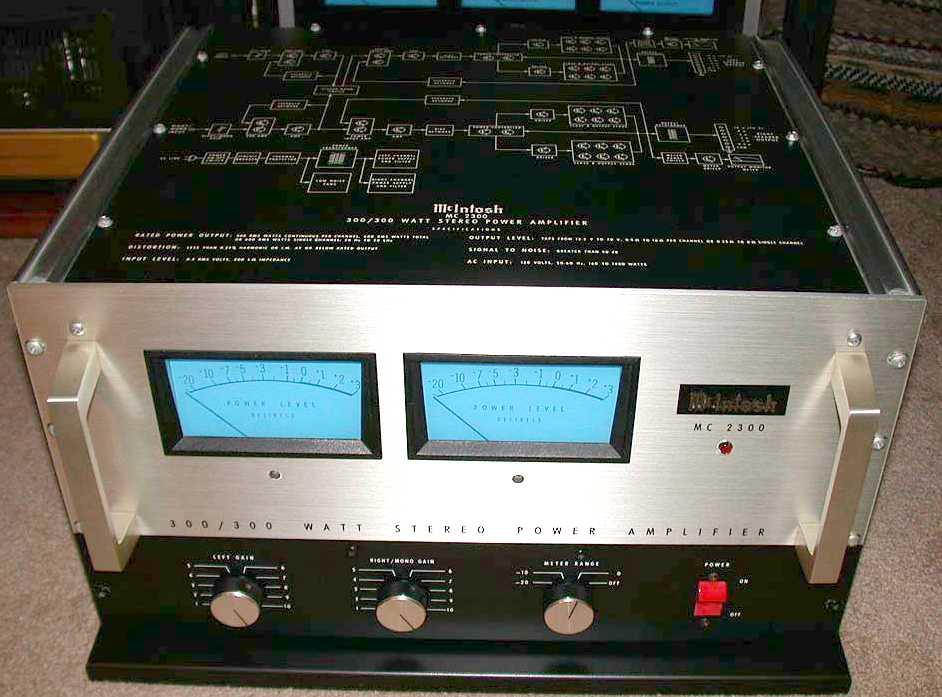
Mcintosh MC-2300 Front

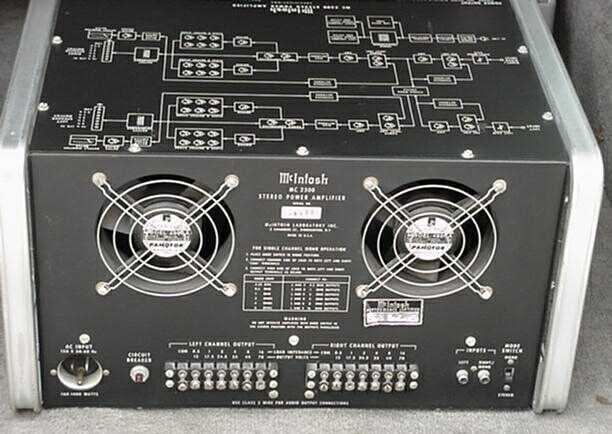
Mcintosh MC-2300 Back

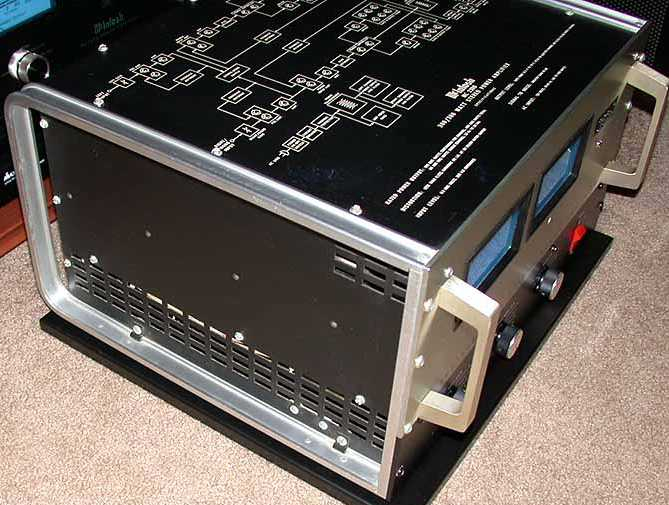
McIntosh MC-2300 Side

During the 1970s, the MC-2300 was an expensive piece of audio equipment, with a retail price of $1799 by the time of its discontinuation in 1980. The amplifier's outstanding power and sound production quality made it a valued part of many recording studios, and although some people prefer the sound of tube amplifiers, the overall greater reliability and freedom from repair of the newer solid-state amps was a major vote in their favor.

== History ==
The improvisational rock band the Grateful Dead employed 48 McIntosh MC-2300 amps as the main power source for their enormous public-address system, the Wall of Sound. Designed by Owsley "Bear" Stanley and others, this system utilized more than 26,000 watts of continuous power fed into JBL and Electrovoice speakers and was renowned for its natural, low-distortion stereo sound which carried for 600 feet without significant degradation. The Wall of Sound was only in use from March to October 1974.

In late July 1973, the Grateful Dead played at the Watkins Glen Summer Jam in the Finger Lakes region of New York State, along with the Band and the Allman Brothers Band. This concert was attended by 600,000 people - twice the number that went to the Woodstock festival in August 1969. Due to the crowd's enormous size, a significant number of concertgoers could neither see the stage, nor adequately hear the music projecting from it. Additional broadcast towers were set up, but this required more amplification power. Sound engineer Janet Furman was dispatched by helicopter with $6000 cash to nearby Binghamton, site of McIntosh Laboratories, to obtain five additional MC 2300 amps. Despite the fact that it was the weekend, she was able to locate the owner, buy the amps off the factory floor, and fly back to the festival site, with the overloaded helicopter skirting high-rise buildings and narrowly avoiding catastrophe in the process. Thanks to a combination of persistence and luck, the extra MC 2300's were incorporated into the sound system, successfully providing high-quality music to the gigantic crowd.

The Grateful Dead's commitment to playing live with the best sound possible led them to using audiophile, rather than commercial, sound equipment. The legendary build quality and low distortion of McIntosh fulfilled both the sonic and roadworthy requirements.

— "Big" Steve Parish

Grateful Dead guitarist Jerry Garcia also favored the MC-2300, using one for many years in his equipment stack (see picture). On 14 October 2021 during a Sotheby's auction titled From the Vault: Property from the Grateful Dead and Friends Garcia's last stage rack containing a MC-2300 sold for 226,800 USD. More impressively, Garcia's personal MC-2300 - known as "Budman" due to the Budweiser-affiliated mascot sticker - sold at the same auction for 378,000 USD. This amp is the longest-serving piece of Grateful Dead-used equipment. In total, seven MC-2300s were sold:

- Lot 36: Jerry's Budman MC2300: $378,000
- Lot 37: WoS Vocal Cluster MC2300: $35,280
- Lot 38: WoS Piano Cluster: $75,600
- Lot 39: WoS MC2300: $40,320
- Lot 40: Bob Weir's MC2300: $37,800
- Lot 41: WoS MC2300: $25,200
- Lot 43: WoS MC2300: $94,500

On 12 March 2026 Budman sold again for $381,000 near the high estimate USD 200,000 to 400,000 as part of The Jim Irsay Collection, this time by Christie's New York. The auction also included Garcia's Tiger (guitar) for $11.5 million.

== Military use ==
Several specially-modified versions of the MC-2300 were produced by McIntosh for the United States Navy (with 6, 25, 30, 64, 120, 182, and 256 ohm outputs), for defense contractor Sanders Associates, and for acoustical consulting company Bolt, Beranek and Newman (the MC-2300E, with 50, 100, 200, and 400 ohm outputs).
