= Tiger (guitar) =

Jerry Garcia's main guitar from 1979 to 1989

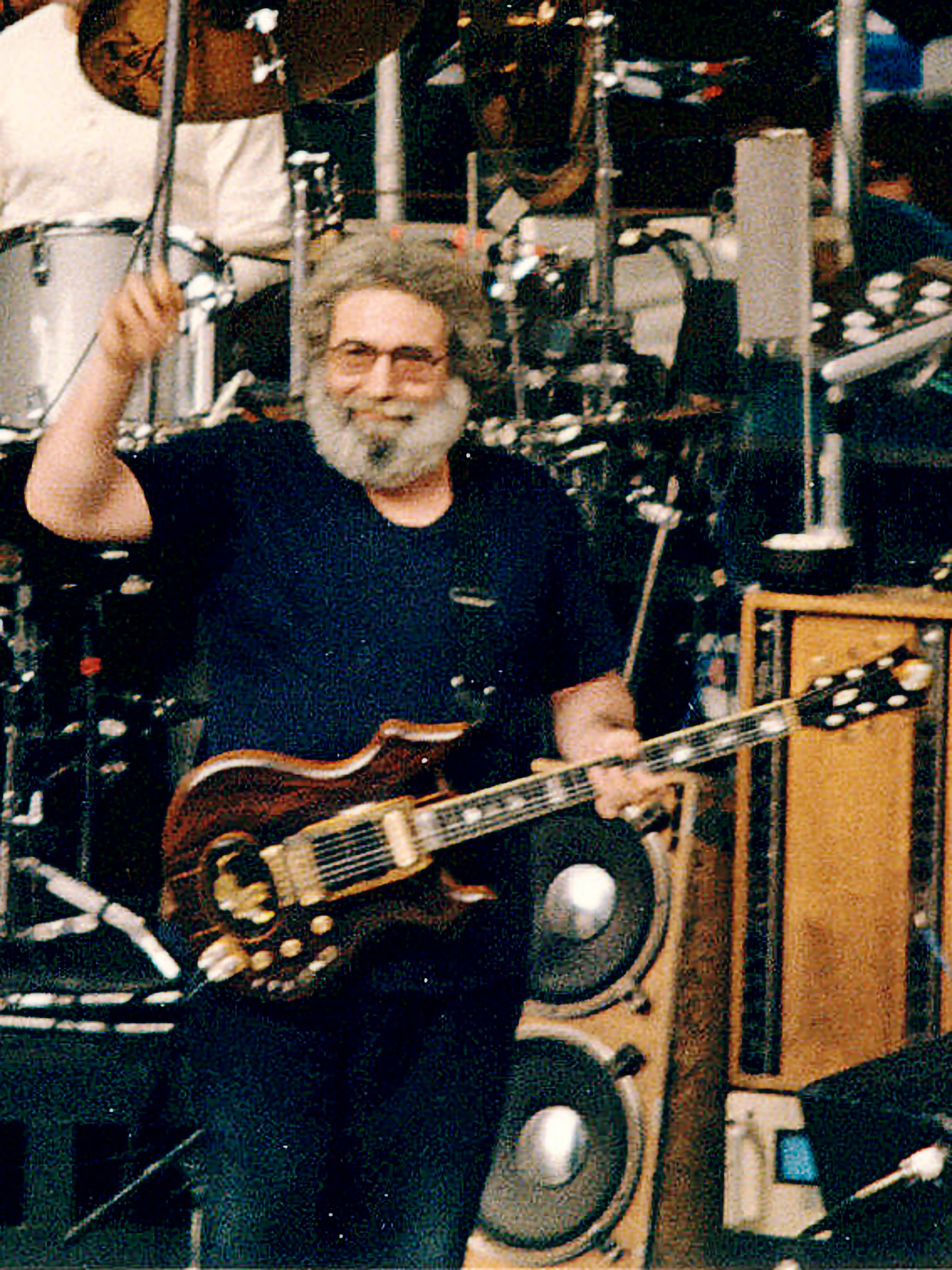
- Jerry Garcia playing Tiger, 1987
- Manufacturer: Doug Irwin
- Period: 1979

Construction
- Body type: Solid
- Neck joint: Set-Neck

Woods
- Body: Cocobolo, maple, padauk
- Neck: Maple, padauk, with brass binding and inlay.
- Fretboard: Ebony with pearl inlay and brass bindings; 25" scale

Hardware
- Bridge: Brass Schaller tune-o-matic style
- Pickup(s): One Dimarzio SDS-1 single coil (neck); two DiMarzio Super II humbuckers (mid and bridge)

Colors available
- Natural

Tiger is a custom-built guitar that was owned by Grateful Dead guitarist Jerry Garcia. Garcia commissioned luthier Doug Irwin to design and build the guitar in 1973 following delivery of Wolf, his first major Irwin-built guitar. Upon commissioning the instrument, Garcia asked Irwin to "make it the way he thought was best, and don't hold back."

Tiger sold on March 12, 2026 at Christie's Auction House in New York as part of The Jim Irsay Collection for $9,500,000 ($11,560,000 including fees).

== Design ==
Throughout the design and construction process, the guitar was provisionally designated as "the Garcia". The final name came from the inlaid tiger on the preamp cover located on the guitar's top, just behind the tailpiece.

The body features several layers of wood laminated together face-to-face in a configuration referred to as a "hippie sandwich" by employees of Alembic Inc., where Irwin worked for a brief period in the early 1970s. The combination of several heavy varieties of wood, plus solid brass binding and hardware resulted in an unusually heavy instrument, weighing roughly 14 pounds (6.4 kg).

== Electronics ==
The electronics of Garcia's Irwin guitars are unique, and feature an onboard preamp and effects loop. Much like a Stratocaster, the three pickups are selected with a five-way switch. Signal from the pickups passes through the tone controls, followed by an op-amp based buffer preamp, or unity gain buffer, which is designed to prevent signal loss due to capacitance when long cables are used. From the preamp, the signal could be routed via a mini-toggle on the guitar's face to pass through a Y-cable to Garcia's effects rack, and then back into the guitar. This onboard effects loop serves to send the full output of Tiger's pickups to the effects while allowing the guitar's volume control to vary the final output.

The effects loop could be bypassed by the aforementioned switch, sending the guitar's signal from the preamp to the volume control, and then out to Garcia's preamped (and heavily modified) Fender Twin Reverb into a McIntosh Labs MC-2300 solid state power amplifier. Tiger started with DiMarzio Dual Sound humbuckers in the middle and bridge positions with a DiMarzio SDS-1 single coil at the neck. The humbuckers were switched to Dimarzio Super II's in 1982. Each of the humbuckers is equipped with a coil cut switch.

Overall, there is one five-way pickup selector, one master volume control, one tone control which affects the neck and bridge pickups, and one which affects the middle pickup as well as three mini toggles, two for the coil-cut of the bridge and middle pickups respectively and one for the on-board effects loop on/off.

== Use by Garcia ==
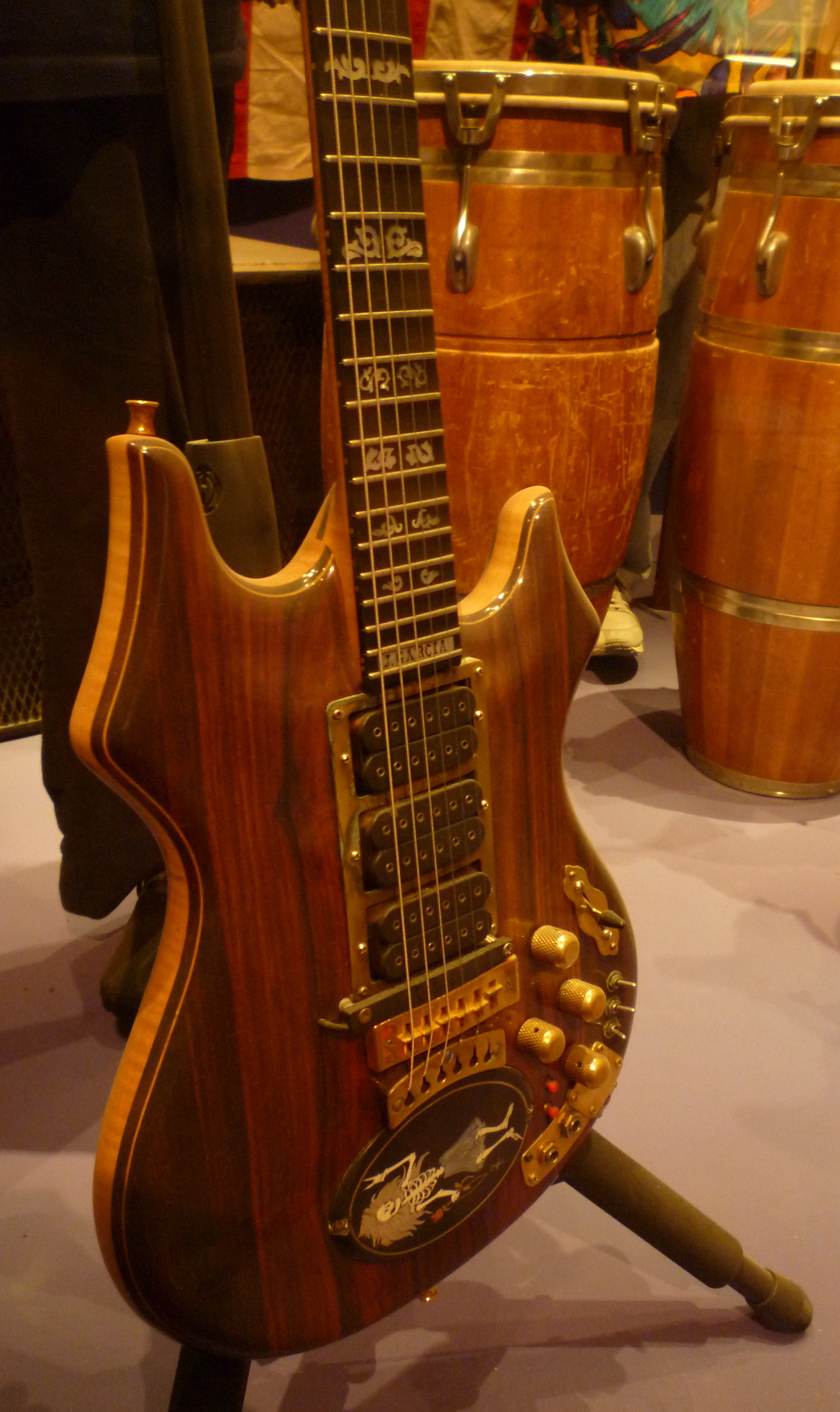
Rosebud, Garcia's replacement for Tiger

Garcia first used Tiger at a concert in Oakland, California on August 4, 1979. Tiger served as Garcia's main guitar throughout the 1980s until it was replaced by a new Irwin-designed guitar, Rosebud.

It was long believed that during the Grateful Dead's final concert on July 9, 1995, a mechanical problem arose with Rosebud and that Tiger was brought out and became the last guitar Garcia played in public before his untimely death the following month. However, in February, 2026, during an auction of Tiger, Christie's confirmed that Tiger was not used during the Grateful Dead's final show on 9 July 1995 as previously stated. Instead, it was clarified that it was in fact Garcia’s final show with the Jerry Garcia Band, rather than the Grateful Dead, where Tiger made its final appearance.

== Disposition ==
After Garcia's death, a dispute arose between Irwin and the Grateful Dead regarding ownership of Garcia's four Doug Irwin guitars. In his will, Garcia gave possession of these instruments to Irwin. The Grateful Dead challenged whether Garcia had the right to convey title and insisted that the band owned the instruments. The parties reached a settlement in 2001 where Irwin was awarded two of the guitars, Tiger and Wolf, and the Grateful Dead took possession of the other two, Rosebud and Headless (the latter of which Garcia had never played onstage).

Irwin sold Tiger and Wolf at auction on May 8, 2002. Tiger was purchased by Indianapolis Colts owner Jim Irsay for $957,500, including commission. Irsay loaned Tiger to be played during Dead & Company concerts and regularly exhibited it as part of The Jim Irsay Collection. Tiger was also exhibited as part of The Metropolitan Museum of Art's Play it Loud exhibit in 2019.

In March 2026, Christie's sold the guitar in the first of four auctions of the Jim Irsay Collection. Bobby Tseitlin of Family Guitars won the auction at $9,500,000 - $11,560,000 including auction fees.

Mr. Tseitlin vowed that Tiger will “continue to be played, heard, and experienced the way [it was] meant to be.” True to his word, Tiger was back onstage the next day in the hands of Derek Trucks of the Tedeschi Trucks Band, a few blocks from Christie's Auction house. In a tribute to Mr. Garcia, Trucks played the Garcia-favorite song Sugaree amongst others that evening.

Tiger represents the second-highest ever paid for a guitar, exceeded only by the sale of the Black Strat at the same auction.

== See also ==
- Doug Irwin
- Alembic Inc
- List of guitars
- List of most valuable celebrity memorabilia
