= The Jim Irsay Collection =

Music, pop culture, and American history collection

The Jim Irsay Collection is a collection of musical instruments, American history artifacts, and popular culture items collected by former Indianapolis Colts owner Jim Irsay. The collection is heavily focused on guitars associated with rock music, but also contains items such as historic manuscripts, film artifacts, and sports memorabilia. From 2021 to 2026, the collection toured the United States as part of an ongoing traveling exhibit and concert series.

Although the collection does not have a permanent exhibit location, its contents have been displayed in museums such as the Metropolitan Museum of Art, the Rock and Roll Hall of Fame, the British Library, the American Writers Museum, Lowell National Historical Park, the Eiteljorg Museum of American Indians and Western Art, and the Indiana State Museum, among others.

In March 2026 much of the collection was sold in auction by Christie's Auction house in New York.

== The collection's beginnings ==
Jim Irsay began collecting at a young age, starting with baseball cards. Irsay had an early affinity for music, playing violin and later guitar. His collecting began in earnest when he inherited the Indianapolis Colts from his father, Robert Irsay, in 1997. Irsay claimed that the collection began as a way to "share music with others."

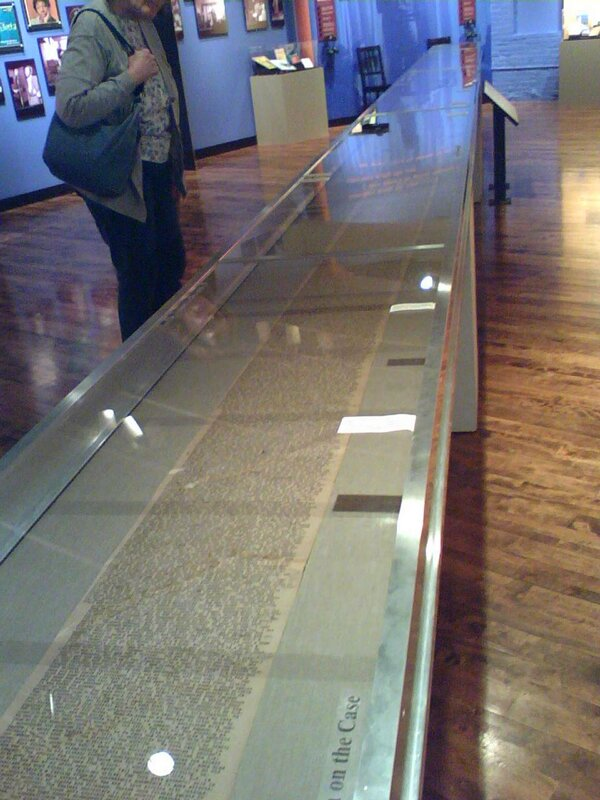
The On The Road scroll on exhibit in Lowell, Massachusetts, 2007

The first major acquisition of the Jim Irsay Collection came in May 2001, when Irsay purchased Jack Kerouac's original typescript scroll for his 1957 novel On The Road. Kerouac wrote his seminal Beat Generation novel over a 20-day period in 1951 while living in Manhattan, New York City. Kerouac taped together stripes of tracing paper to form a nearly 120-foot (36.5m) continuous sheet he referred to as "the scroll".

Between 2004 and 2012 the scroll was displayed in several museums and libraries in the United States, Ireland, and the UK. It was exhibited in Paris, in the summer of 2012, to celebrate the film based on the book. In 2026, the scroll was bought at auction by country artist Zach Bryan for $12.1 million.

The Collection's first major guitar addition was Jerry Garcia's custom Tiger guitar, which Irsay purchased in 2002. Tiger was built by luthier Doug Irwin for Garcia over the course of six years, and delivered to the Grateful Dead guitarist in 1979. Tiger was Garcia's main touring guitar until 1989, and was the last guitar he played at his final live performance at Soldier Field in Chicago, Illinois on July 9, 1995. The collection auctioned Tiger at Christie's in March 2026 for $11,560,000.

== Collection highlights ==
=== Music ===
The collection featured over 200 guitars, several of which were formerly owned by famous musicians such as Jimi Hendrix, Pete Townshend, Prince, Lou Reed, Eddie Van Halen, Johnny Cash, Les Paul, U2's The Edge, Walter Becker of Steely Dan, Neal Schon of Journey, and John McVie of Fleetwood Mac.

In addition to famously owned guitars, the collection boasted a large vintage guitar selection. These include an early Martin acoustic, dating from the 1850s, a 1952 Fender Telecaster, and a 1958 Gibson Les Paul Standard, better known as a "Burst Top."

Other instruments in the collection included Elton John's Steinway & Sons Grand Piano, played during his famous 1975 Dodger Stadium performance, an alto saxophone used by John Coltrane during his 1966 tour of Japan, and a trumpet played by Miles Davis on his albums You're Under Arrest (1985) and Aura (1989).

==== The Beatles ====
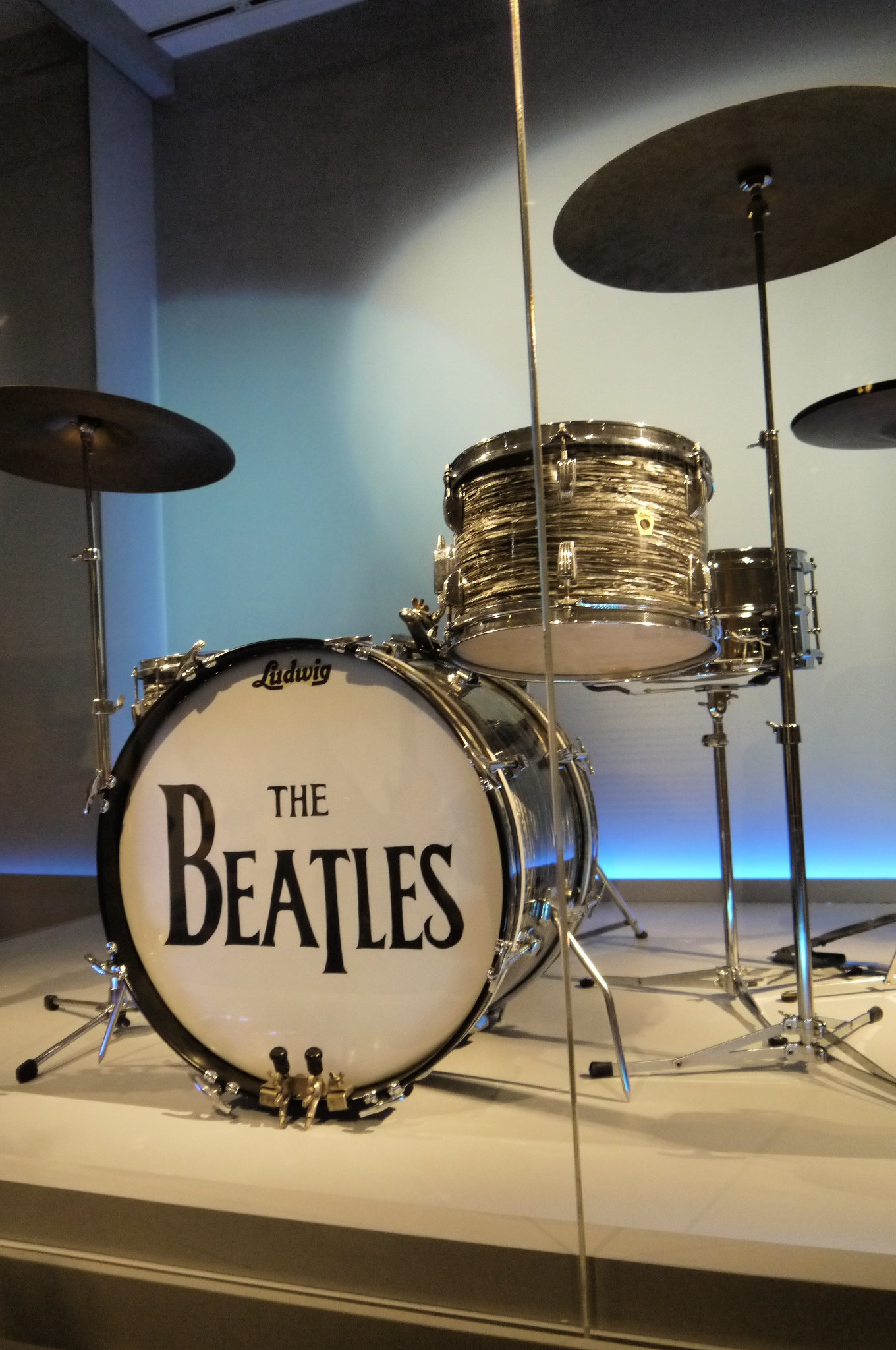
Ringo Starr's 1963 Ludwig Downbeat Drum Kit, on display at the Metropolitan Museum of Art's Play It Loud exhibit, 2019.

Irsay claimed the Beatles as his favorite music artist. The British band is considered one of the most influential musical acts of all time, and their popularity in the 1960s and beyond helped usher in a new era of popular music. The Jim Irsay Collection contained several Beatles instruments and collectibles.

- A 1963 Gretsch 6120 Chet Atkins Nashville model, used by John Lennon on the Beatles April 14, 1966 session."
- Lennon's 1964 Rickenbacker Rose Morris Model 1996, used during the Beatles' 1964 Christmas tour. The Model 1996 series later became known as "The Beatle Backer" after Rickenbacker's UK distributor, Rose Morris, featured Lennon in an advertising campaign for the guitar.
- George Harrison's 1964 Gibson SG, also used on "Paperback Writer," as well as the album Revolver (1966). Harrison later gave the guitar to Pete Ham of Badfinger who used it on their 1972 song "Baby Blue."
- Ringo Starr's first Ludwig drum kit used with the Beatles while touring Europe in 1963. The collection auctioned the kit in 2026 for $2,393,000.
- The bass drumhead used on Ringo Starr's drum kit during the Beatles' first performance on The Ed Sullivan Show on February 9, 1964. The Beatles appearance on The Ed Sullivan Show was their first in front of an American audience. It was seen by over 73 million viewers and became known as a cultural watershed that launched American Beatlemania, as well as the wider British Invasion of American popular music. The drumhead was auctioned for $2.9m, the highest price for a drum ever auctioned.
- John Lennon's 1870s John Broadwood & Sons upright piano, kept in his home and used to pen several songs on Sgt. Pepper's Lonely Hearts Club Band (1967). The piano sold for $3,247,000 at the 2026 Christie's auction.
- Studio-used lyric sheet, handwritten by Paul McCartney, for the song "Hey Jude."

==== Bob Dylan ====
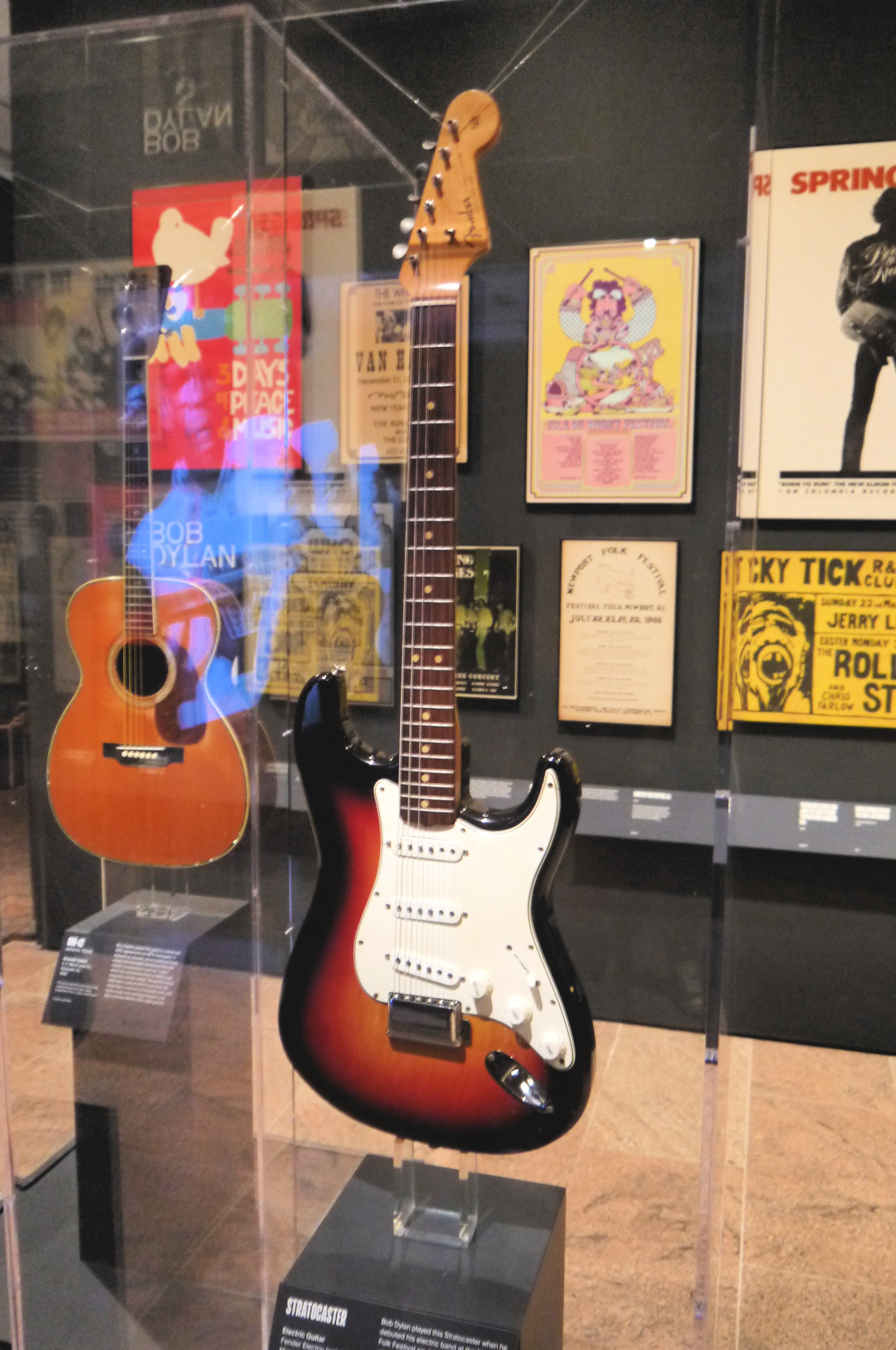
Bob Dylan's 1964 Fender Stratocaster and Eric Clapton's 1939 Martin 000–42, on display at the Metropolitan Museum of Art's Play It Loud exhibit, 2019

In 2013 Irsay acquired the 1964 Fender Stratocaster used by Bob Dylan during his July 25, 1965 performance at the Newport Folk Festival. Dylan plugged in for the first time with an electric guitar playing his song "Maggie's Farm," followed by electric renditions of "Like a Rolling Stone," and "Phantom Engineer," an early version of "It Takes a Lot to Laugh, It Takes a Train to Cry."

The crowd's reaction to Dylan's performance was mixed. Some claimed that the boos heard from the crowd were due to poor sound quality, while others believed that audience members were upset with Dylan for eschewing his folk roots. This performance was an important moment in the history of popular music, leading this guitar to be known as the "Dylan Goes Electric" guitar.

The guitar was left on Dylan's private plane after the concert. The pilot initially tried to return the guitar to Dylan, but after being unsuccessful in his attempt he kept the guitar and eventually gave it to his daughter. The daughter later auctioned the guitar, where it was purchased by Irsay.

Irsay also owned the original handwritten lyrics to Dylan's 1963 song "The Times They Are a-Changin'," which includes crossed-out sections of lyrics that did not appear on the recorded version of the song.

==== Eric Clapton ====
Blues rocker Eric Clapton was represented in the collection with two guitars. Clapton is considered one of the best guitarists of all time, with Rolling Stone ranking him second in their list of the "100 Greatest Guitarists of All Time." Both guitars were sold at Christie's in 2026.

- The Fool, Clapton's colorfully painted Gibson SG, heavily featured during his time with supergroup Cream. The guitar was hand-painted by members of the Dutch art collective The Fool (design collective), where it derives its name. Clapton used this guitar on recordings of Cream songs such as "Sunshine of Your Love," "I Feel Free," and "Strange Brew." The Fool was responsible for Clapton's "woman tone," described as "more like the human voice than the guitar." The Fool was subsequently owned by musician Jackie Lomax and singer-songwriter Todd Rundgren. In 2026, the collection sold it for $3 million.
- A 1939 Martin 000–42, used by Clapton during his 1992 MTV Unplugged performance, including an acoustic version of his Derek and the Dominos song "Layla." The resulting live album, Unplugged was nominated for six Grammy awards, winning three, and sold over 26 million copies. It sold for $4.1 million in 2026.

==== David Gilmour ====
The collection featured two guitars formerly owned by Pink Floyd guitarist and vocalist David Gilmour. Both were sold at Christie's in March 2026.

- Gilmour's Black Strat is a 1969 Fender Stratocaster that was heavily modified throughout its decades of use, and can be heard on Pink Floyd albums The Dark Side of the Moon (1973), Wish You Were Here (1975), and The Wall (1979). The guitar was originally a sunburst color, but was repainted at Manny's Music in New York City – where Gilmour purchased the guitar in 1970. It sold at Christie's for the highest price ever paid for a guitar, $14.5 million.
- A 1969 Martin D-35, which was Gilmour's primary studio acoustic throughout most of his time with Pink Floyd. This guitar can most famously be heard in the opening lead lines to the song "Wish You Were Here." In 2003, Guitar Player Magazine asked Gilmour to name his favorite guitar, to which he replied: "I guess it would be my Martin D-35. I used it on 'Wish You Were Here,' and I've been using it ever since." The Irsay collection sold it at Christie's for $2.4 million.

==== Kurt Cobain ====
Irsay purchased Nirvana frontman Kurt Cobain's 1969 Fender Mustang at auction in 2022. The guitar had been used by Cobain on Nirvana's albums Nevermind (1991) and In Utero (1993).

However, the guitar is most famous for appearing in the music video for the band's 1991 single "Smells Like Teen Spirit." The song was the lead single on Nevermind and its surprise popularity is often credited with propelling grunge music into the mainstream.

In 2026, the collection sold the Fender Mustang for $6.9 million.

=== American history ===
The collection includes important items from American history, dating back to the American Revolution. Items include a John Hancock signed lottery ticket from 1765 for the rebuilding of Faneuil Hall in Boston, the first declaration of Thanksgiving passed by the Continental Congress in 1777, an 1823 copy of the Declaration of Independence, and several letters by George Washington and Thomas Jefferson.

Abraham Lincoln is represented in the collection with letters, a presentation cane, and a pocket knife he was given for attending the 1864 Great Central Fair in Philadelphia. In 2023, Irsay purchased two tickets from the April 14, 1865, performance of Our American Cousin at Ford's Theatre, the night Lincoln was assassinated.

The collection has a rocking chair used by President John F. Kennedy at the White House and a Stetson hat that was to be presented to Kennedy by Texas Governor John Connally on the day he was assassinated. Irsay also owned the top hat worn by Harry S. Truman on the day of his 1949 Presidential Inauguration.

==== Alcoholics Anonymous ====
In 2018, Irsay acquired what he called his "most important" item in the collection, the original working manuscript for the founding text of Alcoholics Anonymous, colloquially known as "The Big Book." Alcoholics Anonymous co-founder William "Bill W." Wilson was the primary writer of the book, but did not share credit or profit from its publishing in 1939.

Irsay was open about his past struggles with addiction. He credited Alcoholics Anonymous' Twelve Steps with helping him to beat his addiction, having attended his first A.A. meeting in the 1990s. Irsay hoped that by purchasing and sharing the book, he could fight the stigma associated with alcoholism and addiction. He claimed, "I think it'll help a lot of people. That's the reason I'm doing it."

=== Pop culture and sports ===
The Jim Irsay Collection contains several items from boxer Muhammad Ali, including his shoes worn during this 1975 bout against Joe Frazier, known as the Thrilla in Manila, his walk-out robe worn during his second fight against Sonny Liston, and the WBC Heavyweight Championship belt he won for his 1974 victory against George Foreman at The Rumble in the Jungle in Kinshasa, Zaire (now Democratic Republic of the Congo).

Other sports-related items have included Jackie Robinson's baseball bat from the 1953 season and the saddle used by jockey Ron Turcotte aboard Secretariat during their 1973 Triple Crown victory.

A Wilson volleyball, used during the filming of Cast Away (2000), a "golden ticket" from Willy Wonka & the Chocolate Factory (1971), and Al Pacino's shooting script used during production of Scarface (1983) were included in the collection's film section.

In 2021, Irsay purchased Sylvester Stallone's early working script notebook for the film Rocky (1976), written by and starring Stallone.

== Traveling exhibition and concert series ==
Since 2021 the Jim Irsay Collection has been exhibited across the United States as part of a traveling exhibition and concert series featuring a display of the collection and a performance by the Jim Irsay Band. Past venues include the Loews Vanderbilt Hotel in Nashville, Tennessee, the Lincoln Memorial in Washington, D.C., the Four Seasons Hotel in Austin, Texas, the Beverly Hills Hotel and the Shrine Auditorium and Expo Hall in Los Angeles, the Hammerstein Ballroom at the Manhattan Center in New York City, the AON Grand Ballroom at Navy Pier in Chicago, the Bill Graham Civic Auditorium in San Francisco, Downtown Las Vegas, TD Garden in Boston, and Lucas Oil Stadium in Indianapolis.

Prior to Irsay's death, the Jim Irsay Band consisted of Irsay, Kenny Wayne Shepherd, Mike Mills of R.E.M., Kenny Aronoff, Tom Bukovac, Danny Nucci, Mike Wanchic, Carmella Ramsey, and Michael Ramos. Outside of the exhibit and concert series, the Jim Irsay Band performed at the 2023 Farm Aid benefit concert at Ruoff Music Center in Noblesville, Indiana. A small portion of the guitar collection was also displayed.

Past featured guests performing with the Jim Irsay Band include Stephen Stills, Buddy Guy, Billy Branch, Ann Wilson, John Mellencamp, Vince Gill, Kevin Cronin of REO Speedwagon, Billy Gibbons of ZZ Top, John Fogerty, John Hiatt, Peter Wolf of the J. Geils Band, and Natalie Merchant.

== See also ==
- List of guitars
- John Lennon's musical instruments
- List of the Beatles' instruments
- The Black Strat
- Tiger (guitar)
- The Fool (guitar)
