= Jim Koplik =

American concert promoter

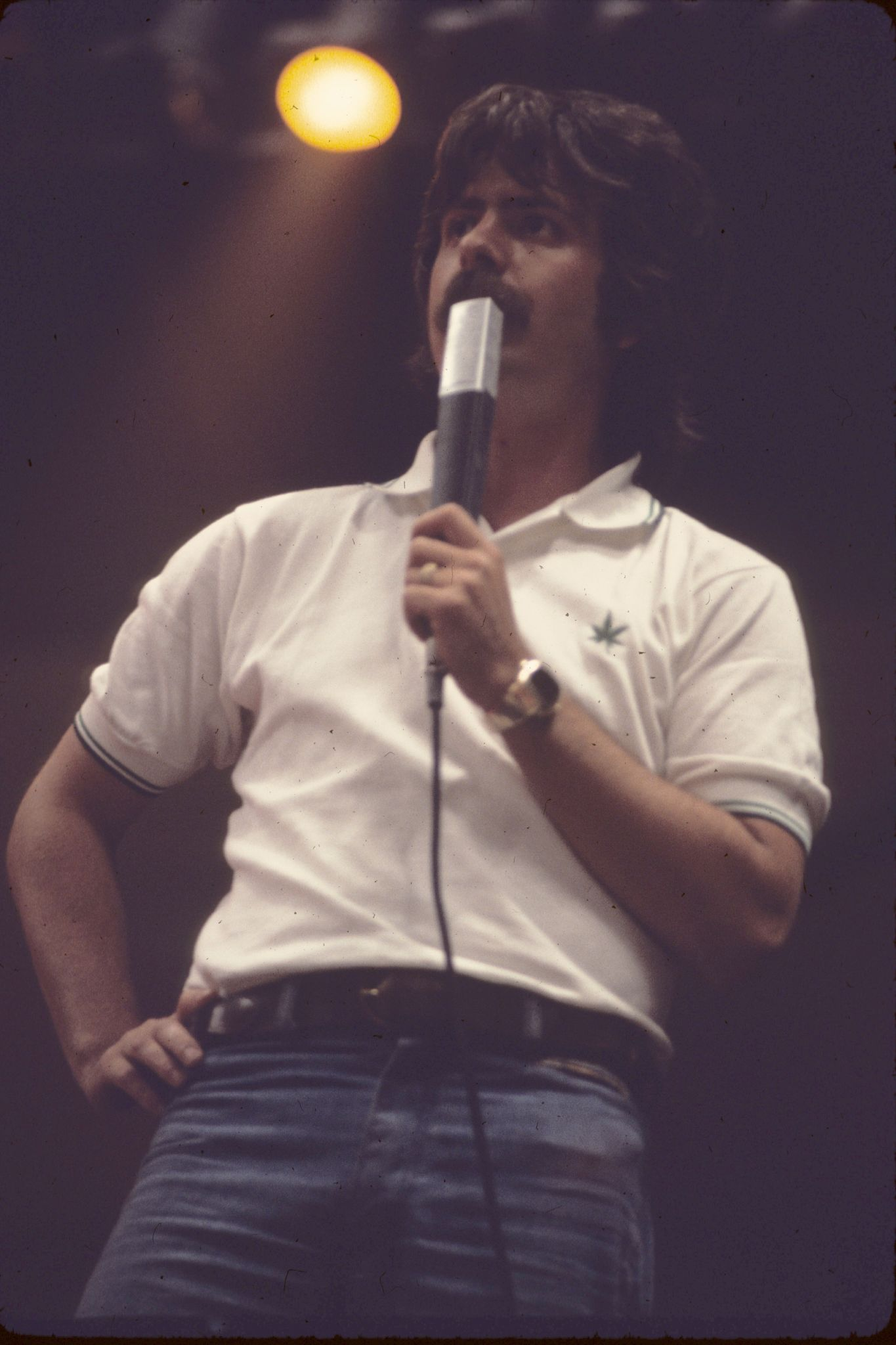
- Jim Koplik in 1977
- Born: New Rochelle, New York; United States
- Occupation: Rock music promoter
- Years active: 1960s - present

Jim Koplik is an American concert promoter who has produced shows by The Rolling Stones, Paul McCartney, Bruce Springsteen, Pearl Jam, REO Speedwagon, Madonna, Billy Joel and Elton John, among others. A resident of Stamford, Connecticut, Koplik works through Jim Koplik Presents, his Wallingford, Connecticut-based company. He is now President of LiveNation Connecticut.

Born in New Rochelle, New York, Koplik launched his career in the late 1960s when he was a student at Ohio State University and promoted a show for the band Steppenwolf. Before that he had worked at Ohio State on the 1968 presidential campaign of Robert F. Kennedy. In 1981 Koplik moved from Westchester County, New York to Stamford.

Jim Koplik Presents produces 150 concerts a year, many for the Toyota Presents Oakdale Theatre in Wallingford, the Xfinity Theatre and for the Mohegan Sun Casino in Uncasville.

Koplik is a board member of Connecticut Special Olympics, the National Kidney Foundation of Connecticut, the Multiple Sclerosis Society of Connecticut and the Jewish Community Center of Stamford. He is a former member of the boards of the Connecticut Children’s Medical Center, Riverfront Recapture and the Connecticut Commission on the Arts.

Jim Koplik (along with Shelly Finkel) were co-promoters of the Summer Jam at Watkins Glen in New York in July 1973.
