= Shelly Finkel =

- Born: Sheldon Finkel; June 27, 1944 (age 82); Brooklyn, U.S.
- Occupation: Promoter
- Years active: 1967–present

Sheldon "Shelly" Finkel (born June 27, 1944) is an American boxing and music promoter. Finkel received the Boxing Writers Association of America Manager of the Year award in 1990 and 1993. He was inducted into the International Boxing Hall of Fame in 2010. Finkel now currently serves as the Chairman of Strategy and Entertainment for LiveStyle.

== Early life ==
Finkel was born in Brooklyn, New York to a Jewish family. His father William Finkel died in 1957 when he was thirteen years old. Raised by his mother Betty Finkel, he attended Brooklyn Technical High School. His first job was at Ripley’s Clothing Store, a block from his house where he worked two or three nights a week at age 14. He continued with odd jobs including as a salesman for a photocopier company. He later began a computer dating service and landed his first music promotion job while handing out flyers outside the dance club Action House. "A guard came outside and took Finkel and his partner, a longtime friend named Eli, into the club to meet with the four absentee owners. They asked Finkel if he knew anything about running a club. Although the obvious answer would have been no, the 23-year-old Finkel, who was full of youthful exuberance, answered in the affirmative and got a job he had not even been seeking."

== Career ==
=== Music career ===
Finkel started his music career through Action House nightclub in 1967 where famous bands such as Cream and The Doors performed. Finkel promoted shows with The Doors, The Who, Jimi Hendrix, Janis Joplin and the Chambers Brothers. He created with partner Jimmy Koplik, Summer Jam at Watkins Glen, which drew a record crowd of 600,000 to see the performance of the Allman Brothers Band, The Band and Grateful Dead. Finkel also managed acts such as Vanilla Fudge and Mountain, before moving into boxing in the late 1970s.

=== Boxing career ===
Finkel began his professional boxing career in 1980, when he helped several Golden Gloves fighters turn pro. He would later take several of the biggest fighters from the 1980s and 1990s pro at once, following the 1984 Summer Olympics and the pro debuts of Mark Breland, Evander Holyfield, Pernell Whitaker, Tyrell Biggs and Meldrick Taylor. Fighters he has managed include Mike Tyson, Manny Pacquiao, Evander Holyfield, Pernell Whitaker, Meldrick Taylor, Mike McCallum and Alex Ramos.

During Finkel's boxing career he put together many large pay-per-view events including Mike Tyson vs. Michael Spinks on June 27, 1988, the largest PPV event as of that date. He also organized Howard Stern's Miss Howard Stern New Year's Eve, which was one of the most profitable nonsports PPV events in history.

=== Back to the Music ===
After managing boxing for more than 30 years, Finkel left boxing in June 2010, saying he wasn’t enjoying himself anymore. Finkel joined New York based sports and entertainment company, The Empire, as CEO after leaving boxing. Finkel announced that The Empire would work to become an entertainment company known for promoting the best events in the concert. Though announcing his retirement from boxing in 2010, he continued to act as adviser to Vitali Klitschko and Wladimir Klitschko. Since leaving The Empire in 2012, Finkel founded SFX Entertainment with Robert Sillerman and took on many roles in the company, from President to Vice Chairman. When SFX restructured in 2016 and emerged with a new name LiveStyle, Finkel remained in his role and continues to be one of the leading EDM promoters, in his position as Chairman, Strategy and Entertainment.

=== Continuing Boxing Management ===
After leaving The Empire, Finkel returned to boxing management at the same time as he built the SFX business, managing such fighters Deontay Wilder, and Wladimir Klitschko.

== Personal life ==
Finkel married Beth Rosenthal in 1976. He has three children William, Lee and Genny.

== Awards and honors ==
Finkel received the Boxing Writers Association of America Manager of the Year award in 1990 and 1993. He was inducted into the International Boxing Hall of Fame in 2010. In 2013 he was inducted into the New York State Boxing Hall of Fame. In 2015, Finkel was inducted into the Connecticut Boxing Hall of Fame.
