= Alembic Inc. =

American audio equipment manufacturer

- Type: Private
- Industry: Musical instruments
- Founded: 1969; 57 years ago
- Founder: Owsley Stanley; Ron Wickersham; Rick Turner; Bob Matthews
- Headquarters: Santa Rosa, California
- Area served: Global
- Key people: Owsley Stanley; Ron Wickersham
- Products: Electric guitar, Preamplifier, Bass guitar
- Website: alembicguitars.com

Alembic Inc. is an American manufacturer of high-end electric basses, guitars and preamps. Founded in 1969, the company began manufacturing pre-amps before building complete instruments.

== History ==
The company was founded by Owsley Stanley as a workshop in Grateful Dead's rehearsal room in Novato, California, near San Francisco, to help improve the band's entire sound chain, from its instruments to its sound reinforcement system. Eventually Alembic was actively modifying and repairing guitars and basses, recording sound, and designing and building PA systems. Artist Robert Thomas designed and painted the logo of the company in 1969, which included multiple elements that represented mankind and energy as values that Alembic aimed to show to public.

By 1970, Alembic was incorporated with three equal shareholders: Ron Wickersham, an electronics expert who came in from Ampex; Rick Turner, a guitarist turned luthier; and Bob Matthews, a recording engineer. The company took over Pacific High Recording Studios in 1971, and the studio was renamed Alembic Studios.

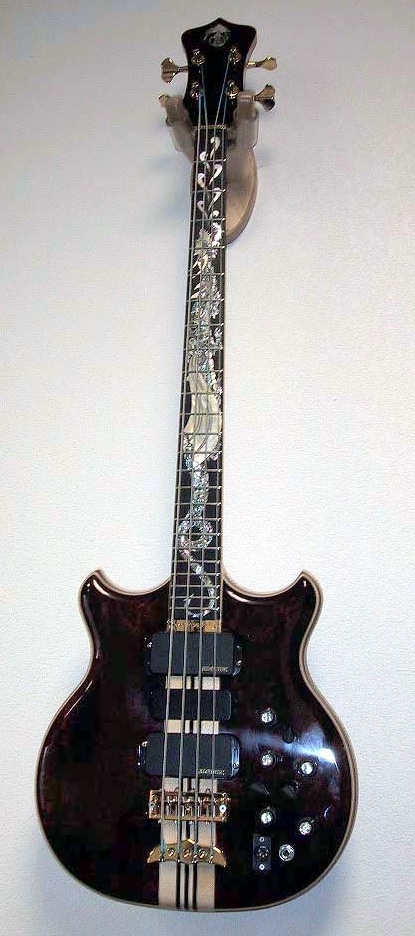
Alembic "Dragon's Breath" custom bass

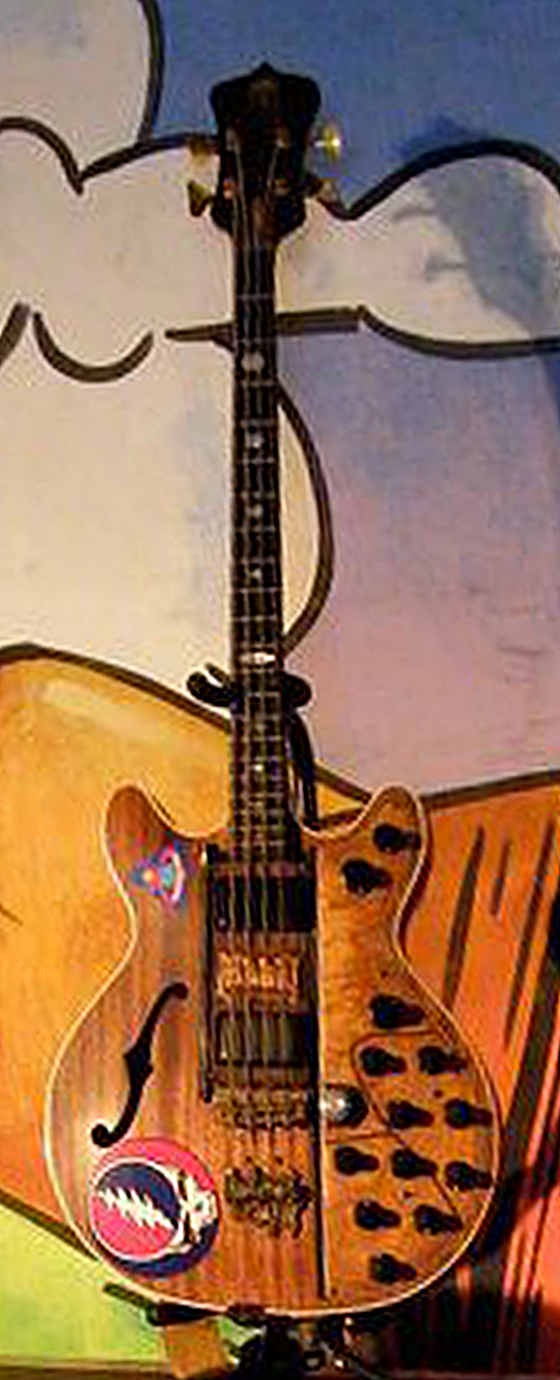
Phil Lesh's "Alembicized"
Guild Starfire

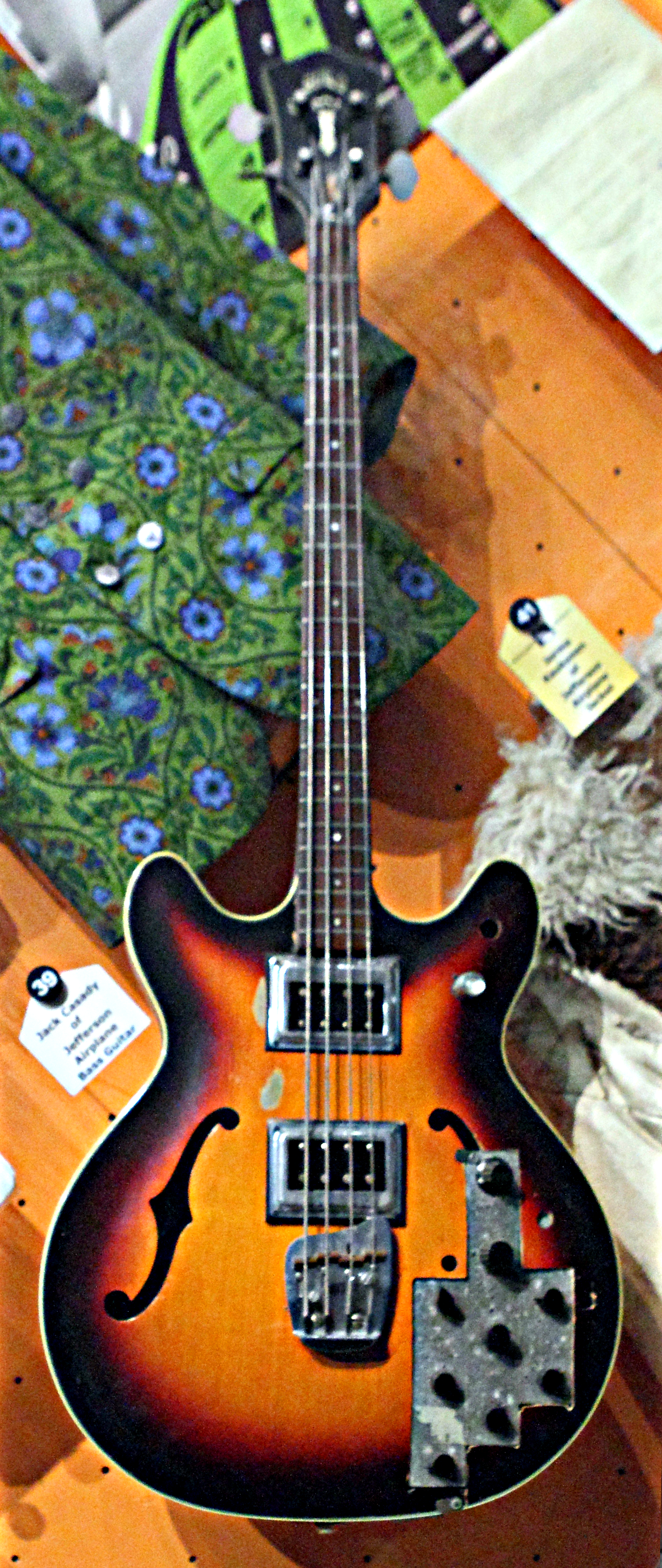
Jack Casady's "Alembicized" Guild Starfire

Inspired by the wide frequency response of the Hagström Bi-sonic pickups installed in Phil Lesh and Jack Casady's Guild Starfire basses, Ron Wickersham and Rick Turner designed low-impedance pickups and electronics with greater bandwidth than the high-impedance pickups typical in electric guitars and basses of the time. To boost the low output of these pickups, Wickersham designed an active onboard preamp. Turner referred to this process as "Alembicizing".

The company's first instrument was a bass guitar, made in 1972 for Jack Casady. This bass incorporated a massive electronics suite, with state variable filtering capability, and had pickups mounted on brass tubing so that their position could be adjusted.

The company sold the recording studio in 1973, the same year a story in Rolling Stone helped generate enough cashflow for a standardized bass guitar line based on the Guild Starfire. At that time, the company had two locations—guitars and electronics were built in Cotati, and the main office was in Sebastopol. 1973 was also the year that Stanley Clarke, then with Return to Forever, replaced his Gibson EB-2 with an Alembic, increasing Alembic's profile. Their bass guitars were expensive, costing up to three times as much as a new Fender bass. According to Tony Bacon and Barry Moorhouse, it was Alembic that started the trend of high-quality, high-price bass guitars. In 1974, Matthews left the company. The recording studio had been sold, as was a retail store in San Francisco where they had sold high-end audio equipment besides their own electronics and instruments.

The first production Alembic instruments were less ornate, and incorporated the PF-5 electronics circuit, later replaced by the PF-6. The pickups were single-coil, with an active hum-cancelling coil mounted between the pickups. This configuration gave the player the fidelity of single-coil pickups without their inherent noise, and is used to this day. The basses and guitars built using this configuration would later become known as the Series I and II, and were available in a variety of scale lengths and body shapes.

In-house luthier Doug Irwin designed and built Eagle for Jerry Garcia. Irwin left to form his own company shortly thereafter, designing four more customs for Garcia, including Wolf, Tiger, Wolf Jr. (headless) and Rosebud.

In 1976, Alembic built what is believed to be the first modern five string bass (tuned BEADG) for bassist Jimmy Johnson. Alembic's January 21, 1977 price list described the five string bass as a "standard" model, available for $50 more than its four string bass.

In 1977, Alembic presented the world's first "graphite" neck basses with necks supplied by Geoff Gould (later founder of Modulus Guitars) at a trade show; it was bought by John McVie of Fleetwood Mac. Production of graphite-necked instruments ceased in 1985.

In 1978, Rick Turner left the company to found Turner Guitars.

In 1979, the Distillate, a more affordable model, was introduced in bass and guitar versions.

== Products ==
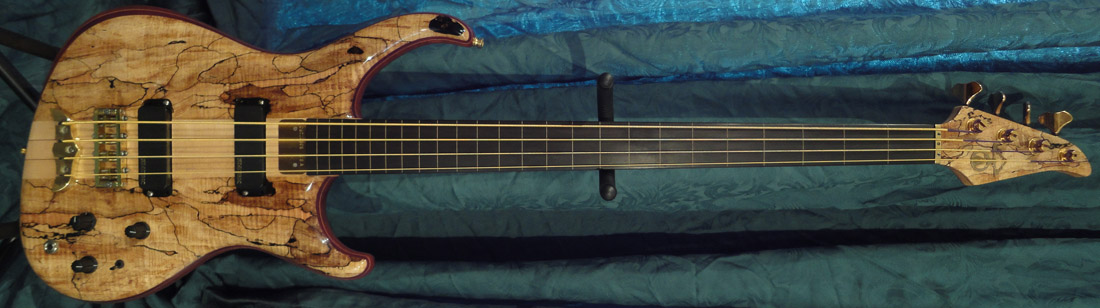
2006 neck through Orion Fretless

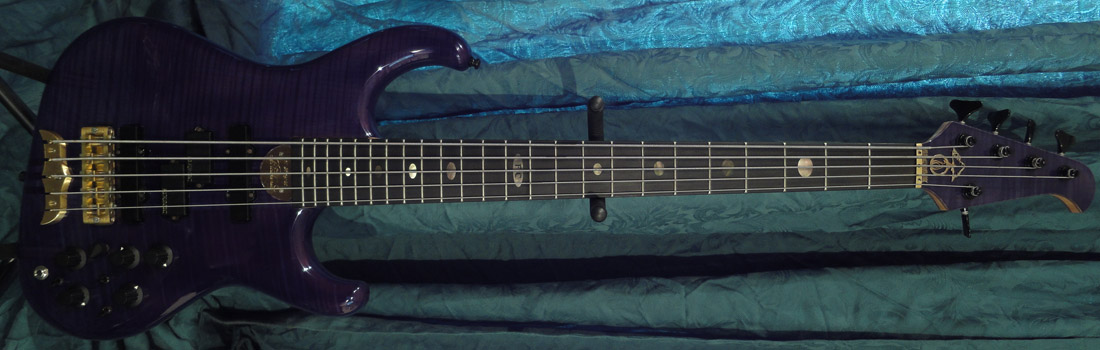
2010 Elan 5 Jason Newsted style

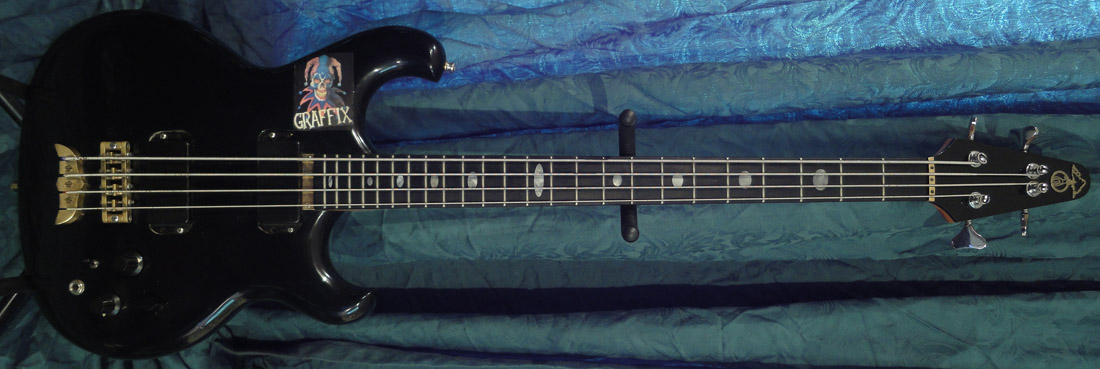
1983 Spoiler

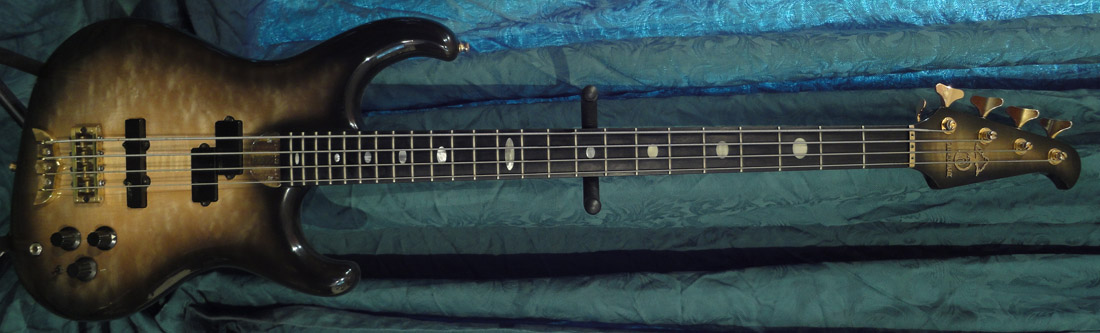
1990 Elan

Through the 1980s, Alembic introduced several new models. These included the Spoiler, Elan, and Europa basses, and the Electrum and California Special guitars. Alembic's model line has continued to expand to the present day, with models such as the Epic, Orion, Excel, and Darling being introduced.

Key design elements from the earliest instruments are still present in Alembic's instruments today. Most Alembic basses and guitars are constructed around a laminated neck that runs through the body of the instrument, using various combinations of often exotic woods such as Zebrawood or Cocobolo. They feature active electronics and brass hardware.

A variety of body shapes have been introduced. The Standard Point, the iconic Alembic body shape, was conceived to force players to put the instrument in a stand, as headstock repairs resulting from falls were the most common repair performed by the company in its early days. Newer body shapes have been introduced to improve ergonomics and to designate new models.

Alembic instruments can be ordered with a wide variety of custom features, including complex inlays and LED position markers in the neck.

All Alembic instruments incorporate the proprietary Alembic active electronics, with various options for tone controls and pickup configurations available, and are made in Alembic's factory in Santa Rosa, California.

== Endorsements ==
While Alembic has largely eschewed celebrity endorsements, the company has made two exceptions to this rule. Stanley Clarke was given a specially inlaid instrument to celebrate 30 years of working together. Mark King, in 1986, received two 34"-scale Series 2 basses and then ordered two more in identical woods with 32" scale.
