= The Black Strat =

Guitar used by David Gilmour

Fender Stratocaster "David Gilmour"
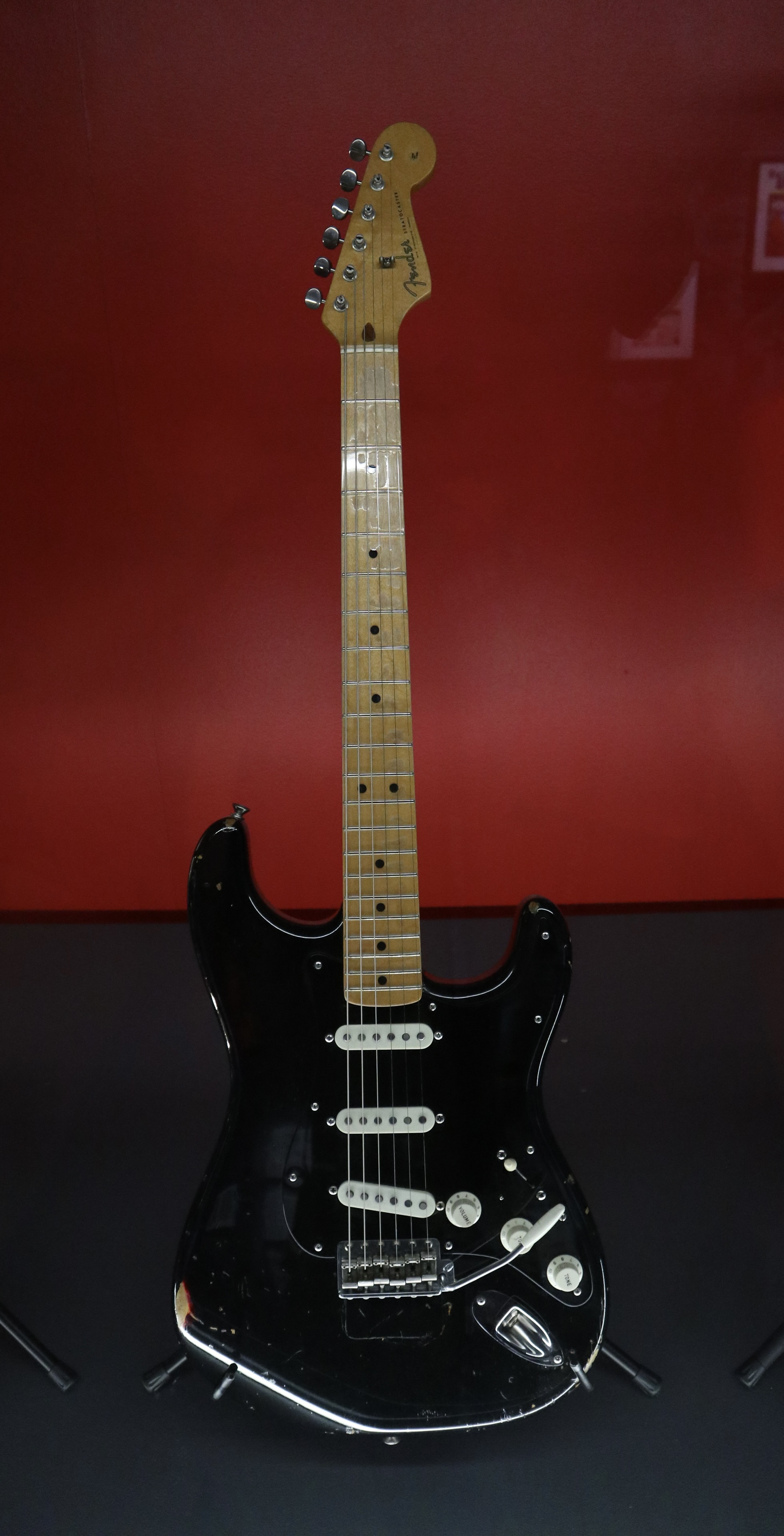
- The Black Strat at the Pink Floyd: Their Mortal Remains exhibition in Toronto.
- Manufacturer: Fender
- Period: CBS

Construction
- Body type: Stratocaster
- Neck joint: Bolt-on

Woods
- Body: Alder
- Neck: Maple
- Fretboard: Maple

Hardware
- Bridge: Standard Fender Synchronized
- Pickup: S-S-S

The Black Strat is a black 1969 Fender Stratocaster guitar played by the English guitarist David Gilmour of the progressive rock band Pink Floyd. It appeared for the first time with Gilmour at the 1970 Bath Festival. Gilmour used it on many albums with Pink Floyd and his solo records, including "Money", "Comfortably Numb", "Shine on You Crazy Diamond", and "Pigs (Three Different Ones)".

== History ==
Gilmour purchased the guitar, a 1969 Fender Stratocaster with a maple cap fingerboard and large headstock, in May 1970 from Manny's Music in New York City to replace two other Stratocasters that were stolen with The Pink Floyd's rented van full of gear in New Orleans. The Black Strat was David's first maple-neck Stratocaster to date and was originally a sunburst colour, but had been repainted black at Manny's.

=== Modifications ===
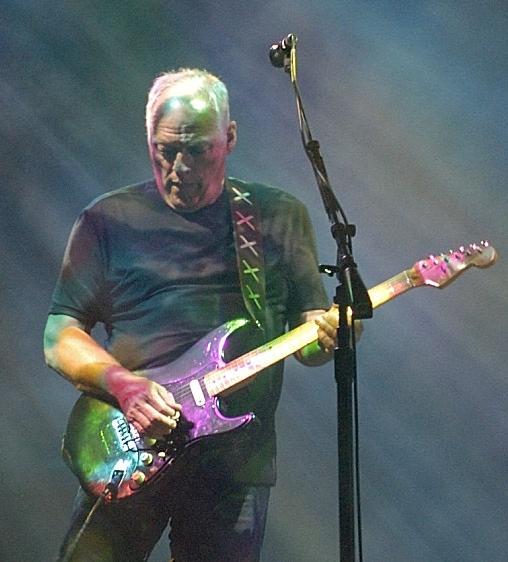
David Gilmour playing the Black Strat, 2006.

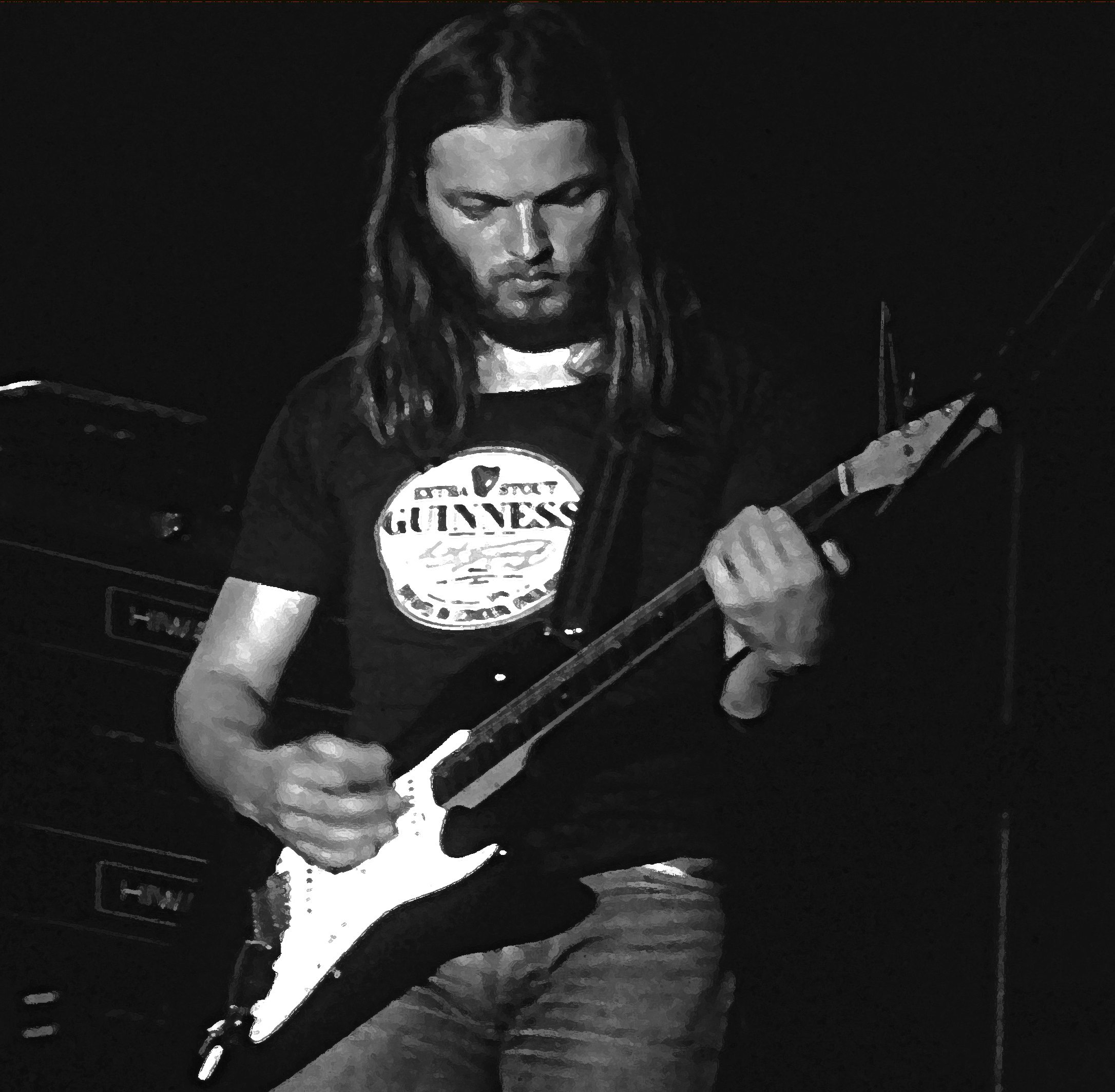
Gilmour and the Black Strat, fitted with a rosewood fingerboard neck and white pickguard, during the 1974 "French Summer" tour.

Throughout the 1970s, Gilmour alternated between using necks with maple and rosewood fingerboards on the Stratocaster, switching the original 1969 maple-capped neck to a 1963 rosewood cap neck in June of 1972.

In 1972, Gilmour installed an XLR connector to eliminate the hum coming from his Dallas Arbiter Fuzz Face; however, this was quickly removed. He also replaced the original tuners with Kluson tuners. In 1973, a Gibson PAF Humbucker was installed between the bridge and middle positions of the Strat, but he took out the original single coils and put them in the black pickguard later on. In 1976, the original bridge pickup was replaced by a DiMarzio FS-1. This in turn was replaced by a Seymour Duncan SSL-1. In the 1980s he replaced the bridge with a Kahler Tremolo System, which again was later removed. The installation of the Kahler bridge required a section of wood being cut out to accommodate the larger unit, which in turn meant a new piece of wood had to be inserted and sprayed black when the old bridge was returned. He also replaced the original tremolo arm with a shortened one.

During the post Roger Waters era, David Gilmour switched to several vintage reissue Stratocasters from Fender. The most notable one being a candy apple red Stratocaster fitted with EMG pickups. The Black Strat was promptly retired and put on display at the Hard Rock Cafe in Dallas, Texas on a loan-agreement in 1986. The guitar was returned to Gilmour June of 1997 in horrible condition, having not been displayed in a glass case during its time at the Hard Rock Cafe in Miami,Florida. Rather hanging eye-level over a table. It sustained significant damage and the theft of many of its parts. Due to the constant modifications, the only original part on the guitar, apart from the body, is believed to (possibly) be the bridge plate.

=== Performance ===
After its repair and restoration, Gilmour played the Black Strat again. This includes his On an Island tour of 2006, at Pink Floyd's reunion at Live 8 in 2005, his Rattle That Lock Tour of 2015–2016, for solos on Pink Floyd's final album The Endless River, and his 2015 album Rattle That Lock.

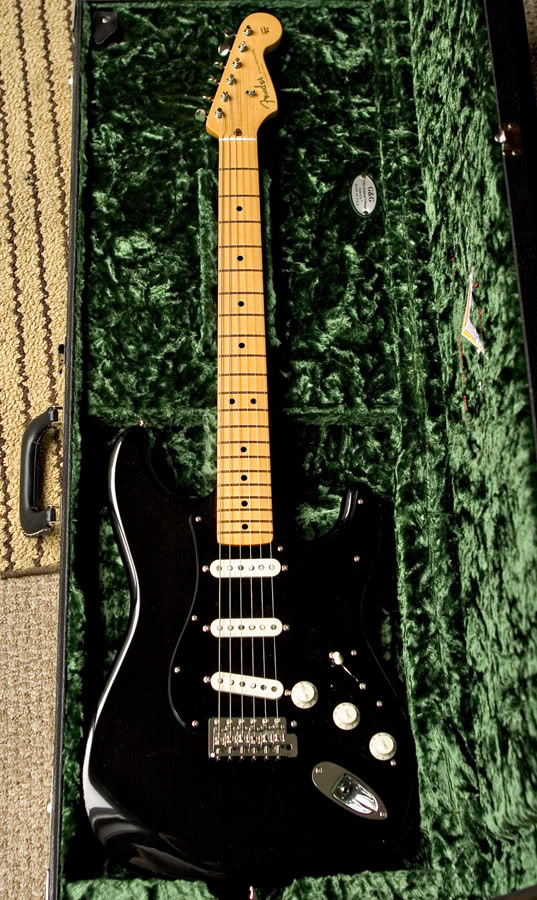
Fender Custom Shop David Gilmour Signature Stratocaster

In 2008, Fender announced that their Custom Shop would be making a David Gilmour Signature Black Stratocaster. Technicians worked with both Gilmour and his guitar technician Phil Taylor to recreate the Black Strat. The finished model featured in the Custom Shop lineup until 2019.

Taylor is also the author of a book The Black Strat which covers in depth all the modifications and changes made to the Black Strat, along with its use on Pink Floyd tours and albums.

=== Sale ===
In June 2019 Gilmour auctioned several of his guitars at Christie's with the proceeds going to the environmental law charity ClientEarth. The sale included the Black Strat and the #0001 Strat. The Black Strat became the most expensive guitar ever sold, selling for US$3.975 million to the Indianapolis Colts owner Jim Irsay, who exhibited it as part of the Jim Irsay Collection.

The record was broken in June 2020, when Kurt Cobain's 1959 Martin D-18E sold at a Beverly Hills auction for US$5,000,000 (US$6,100,000 after buyer's premium and related expenses) to Peter Freedman, co-founder of Røde Microphones.

In 2026, following his death, Irsay's collection was auctioned again. The Black Strat was purchased for a new record price of US$14,560,000.

== See also ==
- The 0001 Strat
- List of guitars
- List of most valuable celebrity memorabilia
