= Doug Irwin =

American luthier (1949/1950–2026)

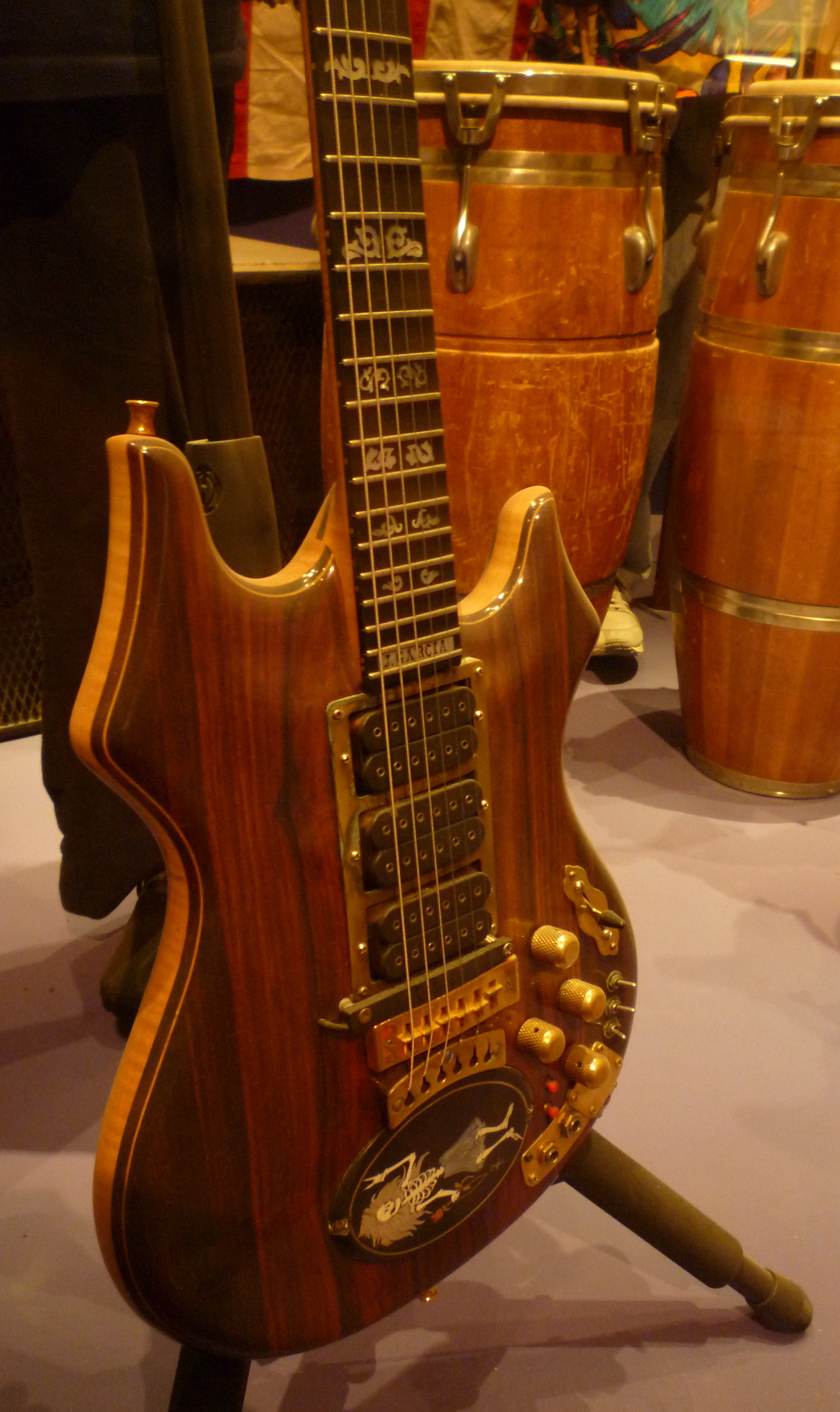
Doug Irwin Rosebud

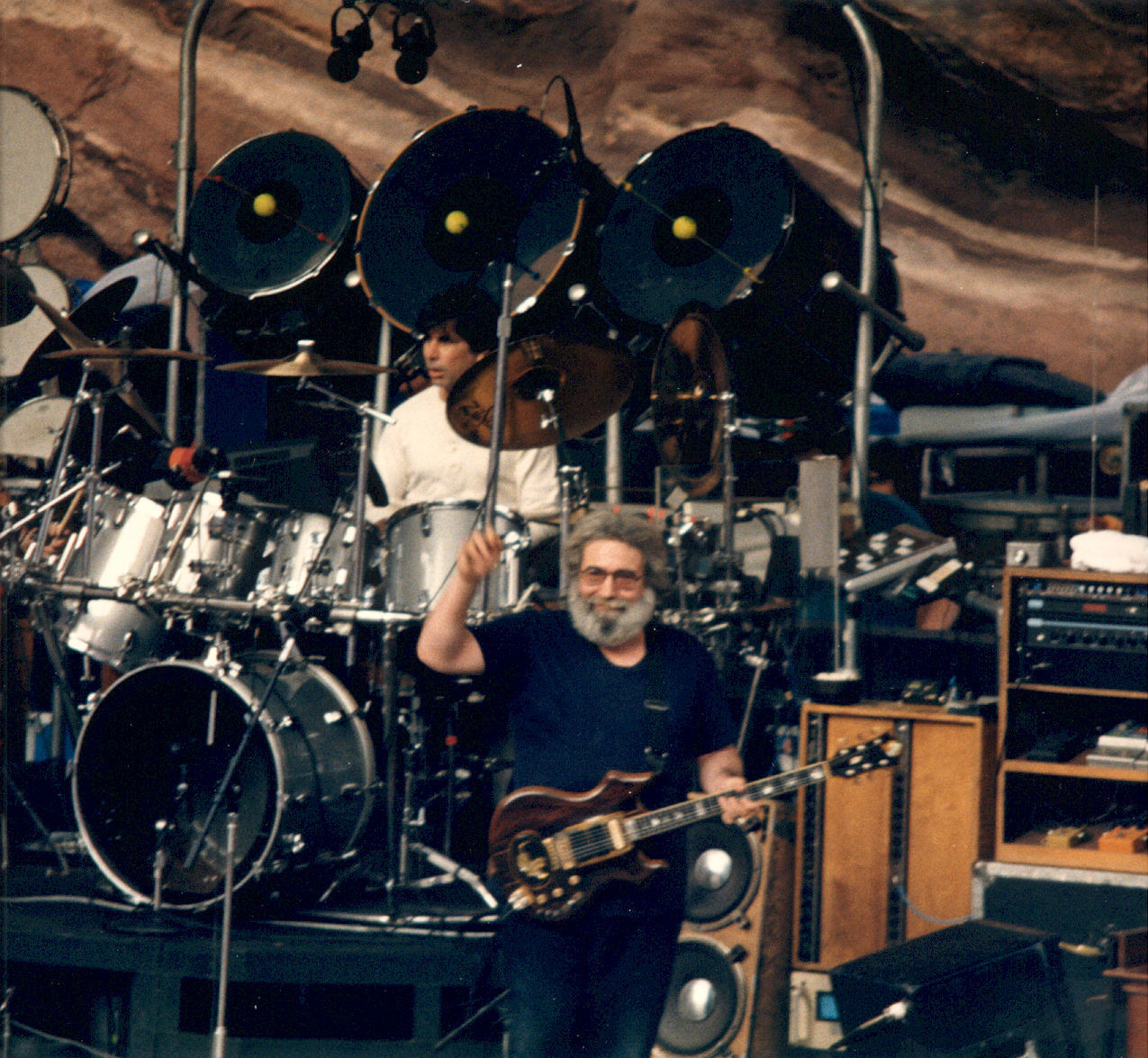
Jerry Garcia (front) playing Tiger, and Mickey Hart (rear)

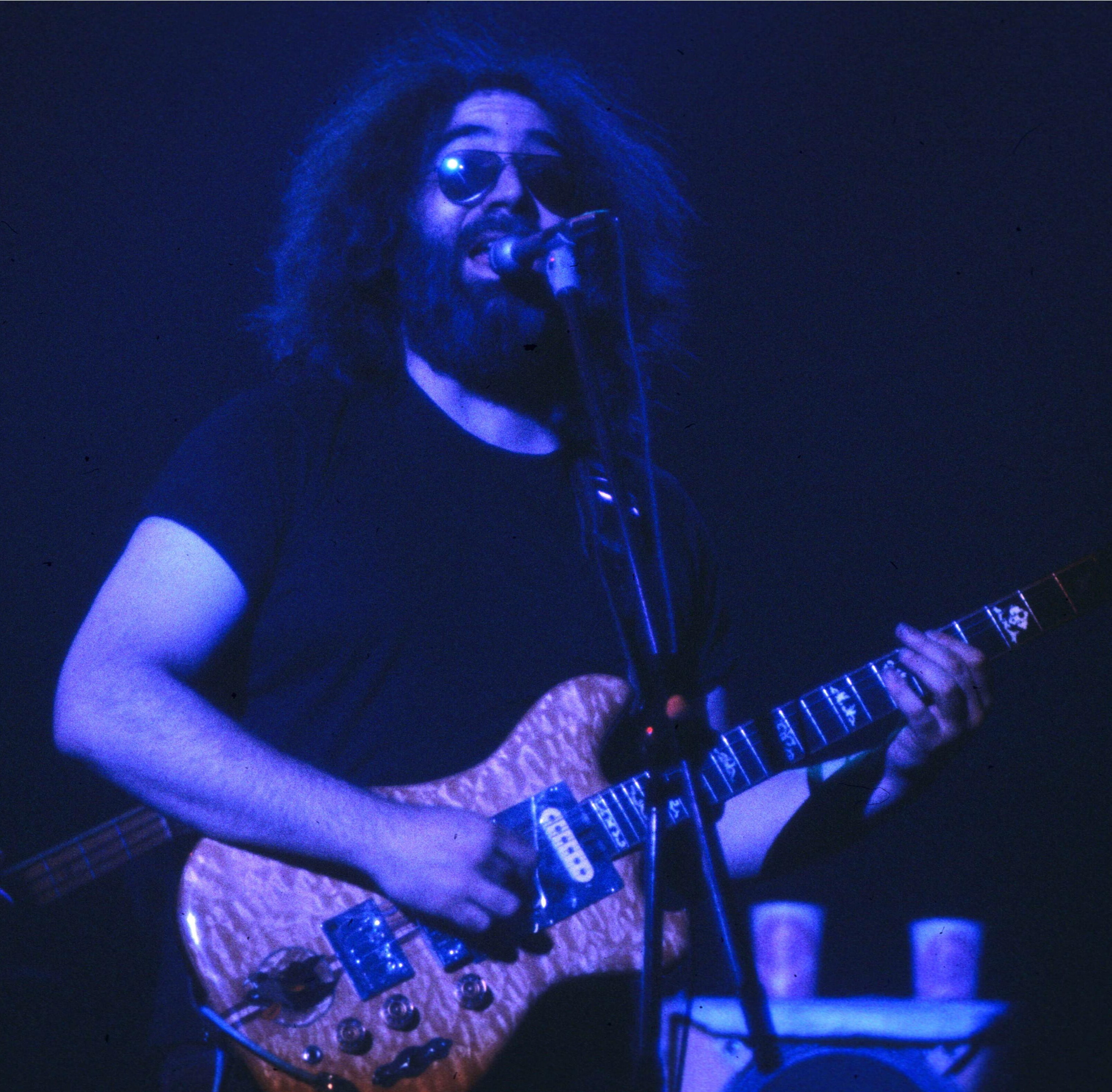
Jerry Garcia playing Wolf

Doug Irwin (1949 or 1950 – March 27, 2026) was an American luthier who designed five custom guitars for Jerry Garcia of the Grateful Dead. The guitars he built for Garcia included Eagle (Alembic), Wolf (modified Alembic), Tiger, Wolf Jr. (headless) and Rosebud.

Irwin also built more than 50 other guitars and basses including a bass for Pete Sears and a bass for Phil Lesh. Two other guitars are documented as being built by Irwin: Rosewood and a Les Paul type guitar. These two guitars appear in the one and only D. Irwin Guitar Company sales brochure.

After the death of Jerry Garcia in 1995, Garcia's will directed that his Irwin-made guitars be returned to Irwin. After a legal battle with the remaining members of the Grateful Dead, the parties settled and agreed that Irwin would receive "Wolf" and "Tiger" and GD Productions would keep "Rosebud" and "Wolf Jr." (Wolf Jr. is sometimes referred to as "headless" and was never played by Jerry in concert). In the agreement Irwin was to sell Tiger and Wolf at auction. Wolf went for $789,500 including the buyer's premium, Tiger sold for $957,500 including the buyer's premium. It is believed that at the time, Tiger's price was the highest ever paid for a guitar at auction.

Eagle, the first guitar that Irwin built under his own name, and the first Irwin guitar purchased by Jerry Garcia was auctioned via Bonhams on May 8, 2007, for $186,000, inclusive of the buyer's premium.

Irwin died on March 27, 2026, at the age of 76.
