= The Arista Years =

Compilation album by Grateful Dead
- Released: October 15, 1996
- Recorded: 1977–1990
- Genres: Rock, jam band, folk rock
- Length: 152:07
- Label: Arista
- Producers: Jerry Garcia, Lowell George

Grateful Dead chronology
Dick's Picks Volume 6 (1996)	The Arista Years (1996)	Selections from the Arista Years (1997)

Professional ratings
Review scores
Source	Rating
Allmusic	4.5/5 stars

The Arista Years is a compilation album that chronicles the Grateful Dead's studio and live albums during their time with Arista Records. The album was released on two-CD and two cassette tapes on October 15, 1996. It contains tracks from Terrapin Station, Shakedown Street, Go to Heaven, Reckoning, Dead Set, In the Dark, Built to Last, and Without a Net. The set does not contain any new or expanded recordings. A media outlet sampler, Selections from the Arista Years, was released by Arista in January 1997.

== Track listing ==
Disc one

1. "Estimated Prophet" (Barlow, Weir) – 5:37
2. "Passenger" (Lesh, Monk) – 2:49
3. "Samson and Delilah" (traditional) – 3:27
4. "Terrapin Part 1" (Garcia, Hunter) – 16:20
  - Tracks 1–4 originally released on the album Terrapin Station.
5. "Good Lovin'" (Resnick, Clark) – 4:48
6. "Shakedown Street" (Garcia, Hunter) – 4:59
7. "Fire on the Mountain" (Hart, Hunter) – 3:46
8. "I Need a Miracle" (Barlow, Weir) – 3:33
  - Tracks 5–8 originally released on the album Shakedown Street.
9. "Alabama Getaway" (Garcia, Hunter) – 3:35
10. "Far from Me" (Mydland) – 3:39
11. "Saint of Circumstance" (Barlow, Weir) – 5:40
  - Tracks 9–11 originally released on the album Go to Heaven.
12. "Dire Wolf" (Garcia, Hunter) – 3:21
13. "Cassidy" (Barlow, Weir) – 4:33
  - Tracks 12–13 originally released on the album Reckoning.
14. "Feel Like a Stranger" (Barlow, Weir) – 5:47
15. "Franklin's Tower" (Garcia, Hunter, Kreutzmann) – 5:37
  - Tracks 14–15 originally released on the album Dead Set.

Disc two

16. "Touch of Grey" (Garcia, Hunter) – 5:48
17. "Hell in a Bucket" (Barlow, Weir) – 5:36
18. "West L.A. Fadeaway" (Garcia, Hunter) – 6:37
19. "Throwing Stones" (Barlow, Weir) – 7:19
20. "Black Muddy River" (Garcia, Hunter) – 5:57
  - Tracks 16–20 originally released on the album In the Dark.
21. "Foolish Heart" (Garcia, Hunter) – 5:10
22. "Built to Last" (Garcia, Hunter) – 5:03
23. "Just a Little Light" (Barlow, Mydland) – 4:41
24. "Picasso Moon" (Barlow, Bralove, Weir) – 6:40
25. "Standing on the Moon" (Garcia, Hunter) – 5:20
  - Tracks 21–25 originally released on the album Built to Last.
26. "Eyes of the World" (Garcia, Hunter) – 16:25
  - Track 26 originally released on the album Without a Net.

== Personnel ==
Grateful Dead

- Jerry Garcia – guitar, vocals
- Donna Jean Godchaux – vocals
- Keith Godchaux – keyboards, vocals
- Mickey Hart – drums
- Bill Kreutzmann – drums
- Phil Lesh – bass
- Brent Mydland – keyboards, vocals
- Bob Weir – guitar, vocals

Additional performers

- Jordan Amarantha – percussion
- Branford Marsalis – saxophone (soprano, tenor)
- Matthew Kelly – harmonica, harp
- Tom Scott – saxophone, lyricon

Production

- Jerry Garcia, Lowell George – producers
- Bob Bralove – programming, associate producer
- Betty Cantor-Jackson, John Cutler, Dan Healy, Gary Lyons, Keith Olsen – producers, engineers
- Guy Charbonneau, David DeVore, Tom Flye, Justin Kreutzmann, Bob Matthews, Peter Miller, Jeffrey Norman, David Roberts, Jeff Sterling, Pete Thea, Chris Wiskes – engineers
- Amy Finkle, Stanley Mouse, Gilbert Shelton, Jim Welch – art directors
- Joe Gastwirt – remastering, digital remastering
- Rick Griffin – illustrations
- John Kahn – associate producer, horn arrangements
- Cameron Sears – coordination
- Bob Seidemann – photography
- Christopher Stern – design
- Robbie Taylor – production manager

== Charts ==
Chart (1996)	Peak position
US Billboard 200	95
