= Beyond Description (1973–1989) =

Box set by Grateful Dead
- Released: October 26, 2004
- Recorded: August 7, 1973 – October 20, 1989
- Genres: Country rock, folk rock, rock
- Label: Rhino Records
- Producers: James Austin, David Lemieux

Grateful Dead chronology
Dick's Picks Volume 32 (2004)	Beyond Description (1973–1989) (2004)	Dick's Picks Volume 33 (2004)

Professional ratings
Review scores
Source	Rating
AllMusic	4.5/5 stars
The Music Box	4/5 stars
Classic Rock	3/5 stars

Beyond Description (1973–1989) is the second twelve-CD box set retrospective of the Grateful Dead's studio and live albums. A companion to The Golden Road (1965–1973) box set, it covers their time on the Grateful Dead Records and Arista Records labels, from 1973 to 1989.

The set contains expanded and remastered versions of all the albums during the brief period with their own label (except Steal Your Face), and during their time on Arista (except Without a Net and later box set So Many Roads). Included are numerous previously unreleased studio outtakes and live tracks. The ten albums in the set are Wake of the Flood, From the Mars Hotel, Blues for Allah, Terrapin Station, Shakedown Street, Go to Heaven, In the Dark, Built to Last, and the two live albums Reckoning and Dead Set (both expanded to two-CD sets).

Pre-ordered copies included a bonus disc with five live tracks and a studio rehearsal. The albums, with the bonus tracks, were given individual release in 2006. Previous box set Dead Zone, released in 1987, contains six of the same albums.

== Track listing ==
See individual album pages for more information

=== Disc One: Wake of the Flood ===
- Wake of the Flood

No.	Title	Writer(s)	Length
1.	"Mississippi Half-Step Uptown Toodeloo"	Robert Hunter; Jerry Garcia	5:43
2.	"Let Me Sing Your Blues Away"	Hunter; Keith Godchaux	3:19
3.	"Row Jimmy"	Hunter; Garcia	7:15
4.	"Stella Blue"	Hunter; Garcia	6:27
5.	"Here Comes Sunshine"	Hunter; Garcia	4:40
6.	"Eyes of the World"	Hunter; Garcia	5:16
7.	"Weather Report Suite": "Prelude" (Bob Weir) – 1:22; "Part I" (Eric Andersen, Weir) – 4:14; "Part II (Let it Grow)" (John Perry Barlow, Weir) – 7:08"		12:41

Bonus tracks
No.	Title	Writer(s)	Length
8.	"Eyes of the World" (live at Nassau Coliseum, Uniondale, NY; September 7, 1973)	Hunter; Garcia	17:02
9.	"Weather Report Suite": "Prelude" (Bob Weir) – 1:22; "Part I" (Eric Andersen, Weir) – 4:14; "Part II (Let it Grow)" (John Perry Barlow, Weir) – 7:08" (studio acoustic demo; August 4, 1973)	Weir; Andersen; Barlow	12:36
10.	"China Doll" (studio outtake; August 8, 1973)	Hunter; Garcia	4:02

=== Disc Two: From the Mars Hotel ===
- From the Mars Hotel

No.	Title	Writer(s)	Length
1.	"U.S. Blues"	Hunter; Garcia	4:42
2.	"China Doll"	Hunter; Garcia	4:11
3.	"Unbroken Chain"	Phil Lesh; Robert Petersen	6:47
4.	"Loose Lucy"	Hunter; Garcia	3:22
5.	"Scarlet Begonias"	Hunter; Garcia	4:19
6.	"Pride of Cucamonga"	Lesh; Petersen	4:18
7.	"Money Money"	Bob Weir; John Perry Barlow	4:23
8.	"Ship of Fools"	Hunter; Garcia	5:28

Bonus tracks
No.	Title	Writer(s)	Length
9.	"Loose Lucy" (studio outtake; August 7, 1973)	Hunter; Garcia	4:41
10.	"Scarlet Begonias" (live at Winterland Arena, San Francisco, CA; October 16, 1974)	Hunter; Garcia	9:09
11.	"Money Money" (live at PNE Coliseum, Vancouver, BC; May 17, 1974)	Weir; Barlow	4:20
12.	"Wave That Flag" (live at Springfield Civic Center, Springfield, MA; March 28, 1973)	Hunter; Garcia	5:34
13.	"Let It Rock" (live at Jai-Alai Fronton, Miami, FL; June 23, 1974)	Chuck Berry	3:19
14.	"Pride of Cucamonga" (studio acoustic demo; August 4, 1973)	Lesh; Petersen	4:24
15.	"Unbroken Chain" (studio acoustic demo; August 11, 1973)	Lesh; Petersen	6:21

=== Disc Three: Blues for Allah ===
- Blues for Allah

No.	Title	Writer(s)	Length
1.	"Help on the Way" "Slipknot!"	Garcia; Hunter Garcia; K. Godchaux; Kreutzmann; Lesh; Weir	3:15; 4:03
2.	"Franklin's Tower"	Garcia; Bill Kreutzmann; Hunter	4:32
3.	"King Solomon's Marbles": "Part I. Stronger Than Dirt"; "Part II. Milkin' the Turkey"	Lesh Mickey Hart; Kreutzmann; Lesh	1:55; 3:25
4.	"The Music Never Stopped"	Weir; Barlow	4:35
5.	"Crazy Fingers"	Garcia; Hunter	6:41
6.	"Sage & Spirit"	Weir	3:07
7.	"Blues for Allah" "Sand Castles & Glass Camels" "Unusual Occurrences in the Desert"	Garcia; Hunter Garcia; D. Godchaux; K. Godchaux; Hart; Kreutzmann; Lesh; Weir Garcia; Hunter	3:21; 5:24; 3:48

Bonus tracks
No.	Title	Writer(s)	Length
8.	"Groove #1" (instrumental studio outtake; February 27, 1975)	Garcia; K. Godchaux; Hart; Kreutzmann; Lesh; Weir	5:42
9.	"Groove #2" (instrumental studio outtake; February 27, 1975)	Garcia; K. Godchaux; Hart; Kreutzmann; Lesh; Weir	7:32
10.	"Distorto" (instrumental studio outtake; February 28, 1975)	Garcia	8:10
11.	"A to E Flat Jam" (instrumental studio outtake; February 27, 1975)	Garcia; K. Godchaux; Hart; Kreutzmann; Lesh; Weir	4:35
12.	"Proto 18 Proper" (instrumental studio outtake; February 27, 1975)	Garcia; K. Godchaux; Hart; Kreutzmann; Lesh; Weir	4:16
13.	"Hollywood Cantata" (studio outtake; May 7, 1975)	Hunter; Weir	4:14

=== Disc Four: Terrapin Station ===
- Terrapin Station

No.	Title	Writer(s)	Length
1.	"Estimated Prophet"	Weir; Barlow	5:37
2.	"Dancin' in the Streets"	William Stevenson; Marvin Gaye; I.J. Hunter	3:17
3.	"Passenger"	Phil Lesh; Peter Monk	2:48
4.	"Samson & Delilah"	Trad., arranged by Weir	3:39
5.	"Sunrise"	Donna Godchaux	4:04
6.	"Terrapin Part 1": "Lady with a Fan" (Garcia, Hunter) – 4:38; "Terrapin Station" (Garcia, Hunter) - 1:55; "Terrapin" (Garcia, Hunter) - 2:14; "Terrapin Transit" (Hart, Kreutzmann) - 1:17; "At a Siding" (Hart, Hunter) - 1:01; "Terrapin Flyer" (Hart, Kreutzmann) - 2:55; "Refrain" (Garcia) - 2:19"		16:23

Bonus tracks on 2004/2006 reissue
No.	Title	Writer(s)	Length
7.	"Peggy-O" (instrumental studio outtake; November 2, 1976)	trad., arr. Grateful Dead	4:42
8.	"The Ascent" (instrumental studio outtake; November 2, 1976)	Grateful Dead	1:58
9.	"Catfish John" (studio outtake; Fall 1976)	Bob McDill; Allen Reynolds	4:43
10.	"Equinox" (studio outtake; February 17, 1977)	Lesh	5:15
11.	"Fire on the Mountain" (studio outtake; February, 1977)	Hart; Hunter	6:25
12.	"Dancin' in the Streets" (live at Barton Hall, Cornell Univ., Ithaca, NY; May 8, 1977)	Stevenson; Gaye; Hunter	16:17

=== Disc Five: Shakedown Street ===
- Shakedown Street

No.	Title	Writer(s)	Length
1.	"Good Lovin'"	Rudy Clark; Arthur Resnick	4:51
2.	"France"	Mickey Hart; Robert Hunter; Bob Weir	4:03
3.	"Shakedown Street"	Garcia; Hunter	4:59
4.	"Serengetti"	Hart; Bill Kreutzmann	1:59
5.	"Fire on the Mountain"	Hart; Hunter	3:46
6.	"I Need a Miracle"	Weir; John Perry Barlow	3:36
7.	"From the Heart of Me"	Donna Godchaux	3:23
8.	"Stagger Lee"	Garcia; Hunter	3:25
9.	"All New Minglewood Blues"	Noah Lewis	4:12
10.	"If I Had the World to Give"	Garcia; Hunter	4:50

Bonus tracks
No.	Title	Writer(s)	Length
11.	"Good Lovin'" (studio outtake; July 28, 1978)	Clark; Resnick	4:56
12.	"Ollin Arageed" (live, Giza, Egypt; September 16, 1978)	Hamza El Din	6:30
13.	"Fire on the Mountain" (live, Giza, Egypt; September 16, 1978)	Hart; Hunter	13:43
14.	"Stagger Lee" (live, Giza, Egypt; September 15, 1978)	Garcia; Hunter	6:39
15.	"All New Minglewood Blues" (live at Capitol Theatre, Passaic, NJ; November 24, 1978)	trad., arr. Weir	4:34

=== Disc Six: Go to Heaven ===
- Go to Heaven

No.	Title	Writer(s)	Length
1.	"Alabama Getaway"	Garcia; Hunter	3:36
2.	"Far From Me"	Mydland	3:41
3.	"Althea"	Garcia; Hunter	6:54
4.	"Feel Like a Stranger"	Weir; Barlow	5:10
5.	"Lost Sailor"	Weir; Barlow	5:54
6.	"Saint of Circumstance"	Weir; Barlow	5:39
7.	"Antwerp's Placebo (The Plumber)"	Hart; Kreutzmann	0:40
8.	"Easy to Love You"	Mydland; Barlow	3:41
9.	"Don't Ease Me In"	trad.; arr. by Grateful Dead	3:16

Bonus tracks
No.	Title	Writer(s)	Length
10.	"Peggy-O" (studio outtake; July 16, 1979)	trad.; arr. by Grateful Dead	5:51
11.	"What'll You Raise" (studio outtake; July 16, 1979)	Garcia; Hunter	4:08
12.	"Jack-A-Roe" (studio outtake; July 14, 1979)	trad.; arr. by Grateful Dead	4:55
13.	"Althea" (live at Radio City Music Hall, New York City, NY; October 23, 1980)	Garcia; Hunter	8:17
14.	"Lost Sailor" (live at Radio City Music Hall, New York City; October 25, 1980)	Weir; Barlow	6:42
15.	"Saint of Circumstance" (live at Radio City Music Hall, New York City, NY; October 25, 1980)	Weir; Barlow	6:35

=== Disc Seven: Reckoning, disc 1 ===
- Reckoning Disc 1

No.	Title	Writer(s)	Length
1.	"Dire Wolf"	Garcia; Hunter	3:20
2.	"The Race Is On"	Don Rollins	2:58
3.	"Oh Babe, It Ain't No Lie"	Elizabeth Cotten	6:28
4.	"It Must Have Been The Roses"	Hunter	6:56
5.	"Dark Hollow"	William "Bill" Browning	3:49
6.	"China Doll"	Garcia; Hunter	5:22
7.	"Been All Around This World"	Traditional	4:31
8.	"Monkey And The Engineer"	Jesse Fuller	2:37
9.	"Jack-A-Roe"	Traditional	4:05
10.	"Deep Elem Blues"	Traditional	4:51
11.	"Cassidy"	Weir; Barlow	4:38
12.	"To Lay Me Down"	Garcia; Hunter	8:59
13.	"Rosalie McFall"	Charlie Monroe	2:54
14.	"On The Road Again"	Traditional	3:15
15.	"Bird Song"	Garcia; Hunter	7:34
16.	"Ripple"	Garcia; Hunter	4:38

- All tracks live at Warfield Theatre, San Francisco, CA (September 25, 1980 – October 14, 1980) & Radio City Music Hall, New York City, NY (October 22, 1980 – October 31, 1980)

=== Disc Eight: Reckoning, disc 2 ===
- Reckoning Disc 2

No.	Title	Writer(s)	Length
1.	"To Lay Me Down" (studio rehearsal; September 14, 1980)	Garcia; Hunter	9:12
2.	"Iko Iko" (live at the Warfield Theatre, San Francisco, CA; October 7, 1980)	Traditional/Crawford	4:23
3.	"Heaven Help The Fool" (live at Radio City Music Hall, New York City, NY; October 25, 1980)	Weir; Barlow	6:18
4.	"El Paso" (live at the Warfield Theatre, San Francisco, CA; October 13, 1980)	Robbins	4:41
5.	"Sage & Spirit" (live at Radio City Music Hall, New York City, NY; October 31, 1980)	Weir	3:14
6.	"Little Sadie" (live at Radio City Music Hall, New York City, NY; October 31, 1980)	trad., arr. Grateful Dead	2:45
7.	"It Must Have Been The Roses" (live at Radio City Music Hall, New York City, NY; October 23, 1980)	Hunter	7:01
8.	"Dark Hollow" (live at Radio City Music Hall, New York City, NY; October 23, 1980)	trad., arr. Grateful Dead	4:30
9.	"Jack-A-Roe" (live at Radio City Music Hall, New York City, NY; October 23, 1980)	trad., arr. Grateful Dead	5:08
10.	"Cassidy" (live at Radio City Music Hall, New York City, NY; October 23, 1980)	Weir; Barlow	5:06
11.	"China Doll" (live at Radio City Music Hall, New York City, NY; October 23, 1980)	Garcia; Hunter	5:52
12.	"Monkey And The Engineer" (live at Radio City Music Hall, New York City, NY; October 23, 1980)	Fuller	2:37
13.	"Oh Babe It Ain't No Lie" (live at Radio City Music Hall, New York City, NY; October 23, 1980)	Cotten	7:13
14.	"Ripple" (live at Radio City Music Hall, New York City, NY; October 23, 1980)	Garcia; Hunter	4:37
15.	"Tom Dooley" (live at Rambler Room, Loyola Univ., Chicago, IL; November 17, 1978)	trad., arr. Grateful Dead	3:33
16.	"Deep Elem Blues" (live at Rambler Room, Loyola Univ., Chicago, IL; November 17, 1978)	trad., arr. Grateful Dead	3:42

=== Disc Nine: Dead Set, disc 1 ===
- Dead Set Disc 1

No.	Title	Writer(s)	Length
1.	"Samson and Delilah"	trad., arr. Weir	5:02
2.	"Friend of the Devil"	John Dawson; Hunter; Garcia	7:28
3.	"New Minglewood Blues"	trad., arr. Weir	4:41
4.	"Deal"	Hunter; Garcia	4:36
5.	"Candyman"	Hunter; Garcia	7:15
6.	"Little Red Rooster"	Willie Dixon	4:31
7.	"Loser"	Hunter; Garcia	5:45
8.	"Passenger"	Peter Monk; Lesh	3:21
9.	"Feel Like a Stranger"	Barlow; Weir	5:41
10.	"Franklin's Tower"	Hunter; Garcia; Kreutzmann	5:22
11.	"Rhythm Devils"	Hart; Kreutzmann	4:02
12.	"Space"	Hart; Kreutzmann; Lesh; Brent Mydland	2:29
13.	"Fire on the Mountain"	Hunter; Hart	6:30
14.	"Greatest Story Ever Told"	Hunter; Hart; Weir	4:04
15.	"Brokedown Palace"	Hunter; Garcia	5:42

- All tracks live at Warfield Theatre, San Francisco, CA (September 25, 1980 – October 14, 1980) & Radio City Music Hall, New York City, NY (October 22, 1980 – October 31, 1980)

=== Disc Ten: Dead Set, disc 2 ===
- Dead Set Disc 2

No.	Title	Writer(s)	Length
1.	"Let It Grow" (live at Radio City Music Hall, New York City, NY; October 26, 1980)	Barlow; Weir	9:38
2.	"Sugaree" (live at Radio City Music Hall, New York City, NY; October 26, 1980)	Hunter; Garcia	9:51
3.	"C.C. Rider" (live at the Warfield Theatre, San Francisco, CA; October 13, 1980)	trad., arr. Weir	7:17
4.	"Row Jimmy" (live at the Warfield Theatre, San Francisco, CA; October 10, 1980)	Hunter; Garcia	10:14
5.	"Lazy Lightnin'" (live at the Warfield Theatre, San Francisco; October 13, 1980)	Barlow; Weir	2:53
6.	"Supplication" (live at Warfield Theatre, San Francisco, CA; October 13, 1980)	Barlow; Weir	5:50
7.	"High Time" (live at Radio City Music Hall, New York City, NY; October 25, 1980)	Hunter; Garcia	8:40
8.	"Jack Straw" (live at the Warfield Theatre, San Francisco, CA; October 10, 1980)	Hunter; Weir	6:17
9.	"Shakedown Street" (live at the Warfield Theatre, San Francisco; October 7, 1980)	Hunter; Garcia	10:42
10.	"Not Fade Away" (live at the Warfield Theatre, San Francisco, CA; October 4, 1980)	Buddy Holly; Norman Petty	4:50

=== Disc Eleven: In the Dark ===
- In the Dark

No.	Title	Writer(s)	Length
1.	"Touch of Grey"	Garcia; Hunter	5:47
2.	"Hell in a Bucket"	Barlow; Weir; Mydland	5:35
3.	"When Push Comes to Shove"	Garcia; Hunter	4:05
4.	"West L.A. Fadeaway"	Garcia; Hunter	6:39
5.	"Tons of Steel"	Mydland	5:15
6.	"Throwing Stones"	Barlow; Weir	7:18
7.	"Black Muddy River"	Garcia; Hunter	5:58

Bonus tracks
No.	Title	Writer(s)	Length
8.	"My Brother Esau" (single B-side)	Barlow; Weir	4:17
9.	"West L.A. Fadeaway" (alternate studio version; March, 1984)	Garcia; Hunter	7:08
10.	"Black Muddy River" (studio rehearsal; December 5, 1986)	Garcia; Hunter	5:41
11.	"When Push Comes to Shove" (studio rehearsal; December 5, 1986)	Garcia; Hunter	4:22
12.	"Touch of Grey" (studio rehearsal; August, 1982)	Garcia; Hunter	5:47
13.	"Throwing Stones" (live at Sullivan Stadium, Foxboro, MA; July 4, 1987)	Barlow; Weir	9:36

=== Disc Twelve: Built to Last ===
- Built to Last

No.	Title	Writer(s)	Length
1.	"Foolish Heart"	Garcia; Hunter	5:10
2.	"Just a Little Light"	Barlow; Mydland	4:43
3.	"Built to Last"	Garcia; Hunter	5:04
4.	"Blow Away"	Barlow; Mydland	6:11
5.	"Victim or the Crime"	Gerrit Graham; Weir	7:35
6.	"We Can Run"	Barlow; Mydland	5:32
7.	"Standing on the Moon"	Garcia; Hunter	5:20
8.	"Picasso Moon"	Barlow; Bob Bralove; Weir	6:42
9.	"I Will Take You Home"	Barlow; Mydland	3:45

Bonus tracks
No.	Title	Writer(s)	Length
10.	"Foolish Heart" (live at Alpine Valley Music Theater, East Troy, WI; July 19, 1989)	Garcia; Hunter	11:31
11.	"Blow Away" (live at JFK Stadium, Philadelphia, PA; July 7, 1989)	Barlow; Mydland	12:02
12.	"California Earthquake (Whole Lotta Shakin' Goin' On)" (live at Spectrum, Philadelphia, PA; October 20, 1989)	Rodney Crowell	5:59

=== Bonus Disc ===
No.	Title	Writer(s)	Length
1.	"Weather Report Suite" "Prelude" "Part I" "Part II: Let it Grow" (live at Winterland, San Francisco, CA; October 17, 1974 (Note: See The Grateful Dead Movie Soundtrack for more from this concert))	Weir; Andersen; Barlow	16:57
2.	"Blues for Allah" → "Stronger than Dirt or Milkin' the Turkey" → "Drums" → "Stronger than Dirt or Milkin' the Turkey" → "Blues for Allah" (live at Kezar Stadium, San Francisco, CA; March 23, 1975)	Garcia; Hunter; D. Godchaux; K. Godchaux; Hart; Kreutzmann; Lesh; Weir / Lesh; Hart; Kreutzmann / Hart; Kreutzmann	31:45
3.	"Showboat" (band rehearsal; August 12, 1975)	K. Godchaux; D. Godchaux; Brian Godchaux	2:41
4.	"Shakedown Street" (live at McNichols Arena, Denver, CO; August 13, 1979)	Hunter; Garcia	11:53
5.	"Far From Me" (live at Capital Centre, Landover, MD; August 31, 1980)	Mydland	3:57
6.	"Estimated Prophet" (live at Warfield Theatre, San Francisco, CA; October 10, 1980 (Note: See Dead Set for more from this concert))	Weir; Barlow	10:46

== Personnel ==
=== Grateful Dead ===
- Jerry Garcia – guitar, vocals
- Bob Weir – guitar, vocals
- Phil Lesh – electric bass, vocals
- Donna Godchaux – vocals on discs 1–5
- Keith Godchaux – keyboards, piano, vocals on discs 1–5
- Brent Mydland – keyboards, Hammond organ, vocals on discs 6–12
- Mickey Hart – drums, percussion (except for discs 1 & 2)
- Bill Kreutzmann – drums, percussion

=== Additional performers ===
- for a comprehensive listing, see individual album pages

=== Production ===
- James Austin, David Lemieux – producers
- Cameron Sears – executive producer
- Jimmy Edwards – associate producer
- Robin Hurley – associate producer
- Hale Milgrim – associate producer
- Scott Pascucci – associate producer
- Eileen Law – archival research
- Joe Gastwirt – mastering
- Tom Flye – additional mixing
- Robert Gatley – mixing assistant
- Reggie Collines – discography annotation
- Hugh Brown – reissue art direction
- Steve Vance – design, reissue art direction
