= The Best of the Grateful Dead =

Greatest hits album by Grateful Dead
- Released: March 31, 2015
- Recorded: 1967–1989
- Genre: Rock
- Label: Rhino
- Producer: Grateful Dead

Grateful Dead chronology
Dave's Picks Volume 13 (2015)	The Best of the Grateful Dead (2015)	Dave's Picks Volume 14 (2015)

The Best of the Grateful Dead is an album by the rock band the Grateful Dead. It is a two-CD compilation of songs recorded in the studio from throughout their career. It includes at least one track from each of their studio albums, recorded from 1967 to 1989 and arranged in chronological order. It was released by Rhino Records on March 31, 2015.

The Best of the Grateful Dead includes songs from all the studio albums in the band's discography, along with one non-album single "Dark Star" (recorded in 1968 as part of the Anthem of the Sun studio sessions).

== Critical reception ==
Professional ratings
Review scores
Source	Rating
AllMusic	4.5/5 stars

On AllMusic, Stephen Thomas Erlewine wrote, "[The album] follows a strict chronological sequence, so it takes a little while for the psychedelic haze to lift and the Dead to settle into the rangy, rootsy groove that characterized so much of their existence... From there, many—but by no means all—of the group's warhorses are marched out, all in their studio incarnations.... By celebrating the warts and providing space for that unexpected late–'80s commercial comeback, The Best of the Grateful Dead is a good capsule history of a band that usually defies such straightforward narratives."

== Track listing ==
Disc one
No.	Title	Writer(s)	Original album	Length
1.	"The Golden Road (To Unlimited Devotion)"	Jerry Garcia, Bill Kreutzmann, Phil Lesh, Ron McKernan, Bob Weir	The Grateful Dead (1967)	2:11
2.	"Cream Puff War"	Garcia	The Grateful Dead	2:29
3.	"Born Cross-Eyed"	Weir	Anthem of the Sun (1968)	2:24
4.	"Dark Star"	Garcia, Mickey Hart, Kreutzmann, Lesh, McKernan, Weir, Robert Hunter	Non-album single (1968)	2:42
5.	"St. Stephen"	Garcia, Lesh, Hunter	Aoxomoxoa (1969)	4:27
6.	"China Cat Sunflower"	Garcia, Hunter	Aoxomoxoa	3:41
7.	"Uncle John's Band"	Garcia, Hunter	Workingman's Dead (1970)	4:44
8.	"Easy Wind"	Hunter	Workingman's Dead	4:58
9.	"Casey Jones"	Garcia, Hunter	Workingman's Dead	4:25
10.	"Truckin'"	Garcia, Lesh, Weir, Hunter	American Beauty (1970)	5:07
11.	"Box of Rain"	Lesh, Hunter	American Beauty	5:19
12.	"Sugar Magnolia"	Weir, Hunter	American Beauty	3:17
13.	"Friend of the Devil"	Garcia, John Dawson, Hunter	American Beauty	3:24
14.	"Ripple"	Garcia, Hunter	American Beauty	4:11
15.	"Eyes of the World"	Garcia, Hunter	Wake of the Flood (1973)	5:18
16.	"Unbroken Chain"	Lesh, Robert Petersen	From the Mars Hotel (1974)	6:45
17.	"Scarlet Begonias"	Garcia, Hunter	From the Mars Hotel	4:19
18.	"The Music Never Stopped"	Weir, John Barlow	Blues for Allah (1975)	4:35
19.	"Estimated Prophet"	Weir, Barlow	Terrapin Station (1977)	5:36

Disc two
No.	Title	Writer(s)	Original album	Length
1.	"Terrapin Station"	Garcia, Hart, Kreutzmann, Hunter	Terrapin Station	16:22
2.	"Shakedown Street"	Garcia, Hunter	Shakedown Street (1978)	5:00
3.	"I Need a Miracle"	Weir, Barlow	Shakedown Street	3:35
4.	"Fire on the Mountain"	Hart, Hunter	Shakedown Street	3:49
5.	"Feel Like a Stranger"	Weir, Barlow	Go to Heaven (1980)	5:08
6.	"Far from Me"	Brent Mydland	Go to Heaven	3:41
7.	"Touch of Grey"	Garcia, Hunter	In the Dark (1987)	5:50
8.	"Hell in a Bucket"	Weir, Barlow, Mydland	In the Dark	5:38
9.	"Throwing Stones"	Weir, Barlow	In the Dark	7:21
10.	"Black Muddy River"	Garcia, Hunter	In the Dark	6:00
11.	"Blow Away"	Mydland, Barlow	Built to Last (1989)	6:11
12.	"Foolish Heart"	Garcia, Hunter	Built to Last	5:12
13.	"Standing on the Moon"	Garcia, Hunter	Built to Last	5:21

== Personnel ==
- Jerry Garcia – guitar, vocals
- Bob Weir – guitar, vocals
- Phil Lesh – bass, vocals
- Bill Kreutzmann – drums, percussion
- Mickey Hart – drums, percussion
- Ron "Pigpen" McKernan – organ, harmonica, percussion, vocals
- Tom Constanten – keyboards
- Keith Godchaux – keyboards
- Donna Jean Godchaux – vocals
- Brent Mydland – keyboards, vocals
