= Selections from the Arista Years =

Compilation album by Grateful Dead
- Released: January 13, 1997
- Recorded: 1977–1990
- Genre: Jam, folk rock, rock
- Label: Arista
- Producer: Jerry Garcia; Lowell George

Grateful Dead chronology
| The Arista Years (1996) | Selections from the Arista Years (1997) | Dick's Picks Volume 7 (1997) |

Professional ratings
Review scores
| Source | Rating |
|---|---|
| Allmusic | 1.5/5 stars |

Selections from the Arista Years is a compilation album that chronicles the Grateful Dead's studio and live albums during their time with Arista Records. This is a one-CD sampler sent to radio stations, record stores, and print media outlets by Arista to promote The Arista Years, which had come out several months earlier. As with The Arista Years, the album contains tracks from Terrapin Station, Shakedown Street, Go to Heaven, In the Dark, and Built to Last, and does not contain any new or expanded recordings.

== Track listing ==
1. "Estimated Prophet" (Barlow, Weir) – 5:37
2. "Passenger" (Lesh, Monk) – 2:49
  - Tracks 1–2 originally released on the album Terrapin Station.
3. "Shakedown Street" (Garcia, Hunter) – 4:59
4. "Fire on the Mountain" (Hart, Hunter) – 3:46
5. "I Need a Miracle" (Barlow, Weir) – 3:33
  - Tracks 3–5 originally released on the album Shakedown Street.
6. "Alabama Getaway" (Garcia, Hunter) – 3:35
  - Track 6 originally released on the album Go to Heaven.
7. "Touch of Grey" (Garcia, Hunter) – 5:48
8. "Hell in a Bucket" (Barlow, Weir) – 5:36
9. "West L.A. Fadeaway" (Garcia, Hunter) – 6:37
10. "Throwing Stones" (Barlow, Weir) – 7:19
11. "Black Muddy River" (Garcia, Hunter) – 5:57
  - Tracks 7–11 originally released on the album In the Dark.
12. "Foolish Heart" (Garcia, Hunter) – 5:10
13. "Built to Last" (Garcia, Hunter) – 5:03
14. "Picasso Moon" (Barlow, Bralove, Weir) – 6:40
15. "Standing on the Moon" (Garcia, Hunter) – 5:20
  - Tracks 12–15 originally released on the album Built to Last.

== Personnel ==
Grateful Dead

- Jerry Garcia – guitar, vocals
- Donna Jean Godchaux – vocals
- Keith Godchaux – keyboards, vocals
- Mickey Hart – drums
- Bill Kreutzmann – drums
- Phil Lesh – bass
- Brent Mydland – keyboards, vocals
- Bob Weir – guitar, vocals

Additional performers

- Jordan Amarantha – percussion on "Fire On The Mountain"
- Matthew Kelly – harmonica, harp on "I Need A Miracle"
- Tom Scott – saxophone, lyricon on "Estimated Prophet"

Production

- Jerry Garcia, Lowell George – producers
- Bob Bralove – programming, associate producer
- Betty Cantor-Jackson, John Cutler, Dan Healy, Gary Lyons, Keith Olsen – producers, engineers
- Guy Charbonneau, David DeVore, Tom Flye, Justin Kreutzmann, Bob Matthews, Peter Miller, Jeffrey Norman, David Roberts, Jeff Sterling, Pete Thea, Chris Wiskes – engineers
- Amy Finkle, Stanley Mouse, Gilbert Shelton, Jim Welch – art directors
- Joe Gastwirt – remastering, digital remastering
- Rick Griffin – illustrations
- John Kahn – associate producer, horn arrangements
- Cameron Sears – coordination
- Bob Seidemann – photography
- Christopher Stern – design
- Robbie Taylor – production manager
