= Dave's Picks Volume 60 =

Live album by Grateful Dead
- Released: October 30, 2026
- Recorded: April 13–14, 1984
- Venue: Hampton Coliseum
- Genre: Rock
- Length: 284:12
- Label: Rhino

Grateful Dead chronology
Merriweather 6/30/85 (2026)	Dave's Picks Volume 60 (2026)	Carousel Ballroom, San Francisco, CA, 2/14/68 (2026)

Dave's Picks Volume 60 is a live album by the American rock band the Grateful Dead, released on October 30, 2026 by Rhino Entertainment. It contains the full shows recorded on April 13 and 14, 1984 at the Hampton Coliseum in Hampton, Virginia. It is the sixtieth installment in the Grateful Dead's live album archival series Dave's Picks.

== Background and release ==
Limited to 25,000 numbered copies, the album contains the two previously unreleased complete concerts recorded on April 13 and 14, 1984 at the Hampton Coliseum in Hampton, Virginia on 4 discs, and was recorded by a reportedly "super-dialed-in" Dan Healy and mastered to HDCD by Jeffrey Norman at Mockingbird Mastering. In his "seaside chat" about the album, David Lemeiux, the namesake and overseer of the series, says he couldn't believe they were at number 60. He calls the two shows "magnificent", noting that the "Morning Dew" from the second show was one of the best he had heard from the band's 1980s performances. He also says that the first show is "really interesting", as the second set begins with "Scarlet Begonias" segueing into "Fire on the Mountain", a performance that Lemieux called "massive", telling people to listen to hear the echo Healy added onto the vocals at the end of "Fire on the Mountain".

== Track listing ==
Disc 1

April 13, 1984 – first set:

1. "Keep Your Day Job" (Jerry Garcia, Robert Hunter) – 4:32
2. "New Minglewood Blues" (traditional, arranged by Grateful Dead) – 8:32
3. "Dire Wolf" (Garcia, Hunter) – 3:58
4. "Beat It On Down the Line" (Jesse Fuller) – 3:32
5. "West L.A. Fadeaway" (Garcia, Hunter) – 8:19
6. "It's All Over Now" (Bobby Womack, Shirley Womack) – 8:42
7. "Bird Song" (Garcia, Hunter) – 10:22
8. "Hell in a Bucket" > (Bob Weir, John Perry Barlow, Brent Mydland) – 6:17
9. "Don't Ease Me In" (traditional, arranged by Grateful Dead) – 3:24

April 13, 1984 – encore:

10. "U.S. Blues" (Garcia, Hunter) – 5:20

Disc 2

April 13, 1984 – second set:

1. "Scarlet Begonias" > (Garcia, Hunter) – 11:41
2. "Fire on the Mountain" (Mickey Hart, Hunter) – 12:19
3. "Estimated Prophet" > (Weir, Barlow) – 15:47
4. "Drums" > (Hart, Bill Kreutzmann) – 5:02
5. "Space" > (Garcia, Phil Lesh, Weir) – 6:14
6. "The Wheel" > (Garcia, Hunter, Kreutzmann) – 5:24
7. "Truckin'" > (Garcia, Lesh, Weir, Hunter) – 6:38
8. "Goin' Down the Road Feeling Bad" > (traditional, arranged by Grateful Dead) – 5:13
9. "Around and Around" > (Chuck Berry) – 3:45
10. "Good Lovin'" (Rudy Clark, Artie Resnick) – 7:52

Disc 3

April 14, 1984 – first set:

1. "Feel Like a Stranger" (Weir, Barlow) – 9:00
2. "They Love Each Other" (Garcia, Hunter) – 7:20
3. "C.C. Rider" (traditional, arranged by Grateful Dead) – 9:12
4. "Brown-Eyed Women" (Garcia, Hunter) – 5:35
5. "My Brother Esau" (Weir, Barlow) – 5:34
6. "Tennessee Jed" (Garcia, Hunter) – 8:13
7. "Let It Grow" (Weir, Barlow) – 13:03

April 14, 1984 – encore:

8. "It's All Over Now, Baby Blue" (Bob Dylan) – 7:20

Disc 4

April 14, 1984 – second set:

1. "Touch of Grey" (Garcia, Hunter) – 7:56
2. "Playing in the Band" > (Weir, Hart, Hunter) – 8:08
3. "Terrapin Station" > (Garcia, Hunter) – 12:47
4. "Don't Need Love" > (Mydland) – 5:19
5. "Drums" > (Hart, Kreutzmann) – 8:43
6. "Space" > (Garcia, Lesh, Weir) – 7:55
7. "Morning Dew" > (Bonnie Dobson, Tim Rose) – 12:03
8. "Throwing Stones" > (Weir, Barlow) – 8:42
9. "One More Saturday Night" (Weir) – 4:25

== Personnel ==
Grateful Dead

- Jerry Garcia – guitar, vocals
- Bob Weir – guitar, vocals
- Brent Mydland – keyboards, vocals
- Phil Lesh – bass
- Bill Kreutzmann – drums
- Mickey Hart – drums

Production

- Produced by Grateful Dead
- Produced for release by David Lemieux
- Executive producer: Mark Pinkus
- Associate producer: Ivette Ramos
- Recording: Dan Healy
- CD Mastering: Jeffrey Norman
- A&R: Steve Woolard
- Art direction, design: Steve Vance
- Cover art: Chelsea Housand
- Photos: James R. Anderson, Robbi Cohn, Buddy Norris
