= Robert F. Kennedy Stadium, Washington, D.C., July 12 & 13, 1989 =

Live album by Grateful Dead
- Released: November 10, 2017
- Recorded: July 12–13, 1989
- Venues: Robert F. Kennedy Stadium; Washington, D.C.
- Genre: Rock
- Length: 324:57
- Label: Rhino
- Producer: Grateful Dead

Grateful Dead chronology
Dave's Picks Volume 24 (2017)	Robert F. Kennedy Stadium, Washington, D.C., July 12 & 13, 1989 (2017)	Grateful Dead Records Collection (2017)

Robert F. Kennedy Stadium, Washington, D.C., July 12 & 13, 1989 is a 6-CD live album by the rock band the Grateful Dead. As the name suggests, it contains the two complete concerts recorded on July 12 and 13, 1989, at Robert F. Kennedy Stadium in Washington, D.C. It was released on November 10, 2017. The box set is individually numbered and limited to 15,000 copies.

A concert video of the July 12, 1989 show was screened in movie theaters on August 1, 2017 – the 75th anniversary of the birth of Jerry Garcia – for the annual Grateful Dead Meet-Up at the Movies.

== Critical reception ==
On AllMusic, Timothy Monger said, "Previously unreleased and culled from the band's own 24-track master tapes, the July 12 & 13 shows from 1989 occurred during what many fans consider to be one of their strongest late-period runs. Still enjoying the heightened commercial success from their 1987 hit "Touch of Grey", their repertoire of classic set staples and newly embraced standouts like "Hell in a Bucket" showed a band firing on all cylinders."

In All About Jazz, Doug Collette wrote, "... the two performances that comprise this package deserve to stand on their own terms as final evidence of this tour as part of the last thoroughly stellar string of concerts the Grateful Dead offered before a variety of extenuating circumstances impeded the climb to such heights as contained here.... There's no question the perfectly-proportioned mix of John Cutler's recording, equally broad in scope and deep in range, renders the experience virtually real-time..."

== Track listing ==
=== July 12, 1989 ===
Disc 1

First set:

1. "Touch of Grey" (Jerry Garcia, Robert Hunter) – 6:56
2. "New Minglewood Blues" (traditional, arranged by Grateful Dead) – 8:17
3. "Mississippi Half-Step Uptown Toodeloo" (Garcia, Hunter) – 10:08
4. "Just Like Tom Thumb's Blues" (Bob Dylan) – 5:09
5. "Far from Me" (Brent Mydland) – 5:32
6. "Cassidy" (Bob Weir, John Barlow) – 7:01
7. "Friend of the Devil" (Garcia, John Dawson, Hunter) – 7:52
8. "Promised Land" (Chuck Berry) – 5:01

Disc 2

Second set:

1. "Sugaree" (Garcia, Hunter) – 10:48
2. "Man Smart, Woman Smarter" (Norman Span) – 8:12
3. "Ship of Fools" (Garcia, Hunter) – 9:40
4. "Estimated Prophet" (Weir, Barlow) – 10:45
5. "Eyes of the World" (Garcia, Hunter) – 10:12
6. "Drums" (Mickey Hart, Bill Kreutzmann) – 9:42

Disc 3

1. "Space" (Garcia, Phil Lesh, Weir) – 9:04
2. "I Need a Miracle" (Weir, Barlow) – 4:57
3. "Dear Mr. Fantasy" (Jim Capaldi, Chris Wood, Steve Winwood) – 6:22
4. "Black Peter" (Garcia, Hunter) – 9:09
5. "Turn On Your Lovelight" (Joseph Scott, Deadric Malone) – 6:37

Encore:

6. "Black Muddy River" (Garcia, Hunter) – 6:32

=== July 13, 1989 ===
Disc 1

First set:

1. "Hell in a Bucket" (Weir, Mydland, Barlow) – 8:15
2. "Cold Rain and Snow" (traditional, arranged by Grateful Dead) – 6:34
3. "Little Red Rooster" (Willie Dixon) – 9:24
4. "Tennessee Jed" (Garcia, Hunter) – 8:31
5. "Stuck Inside of Mobile with the Memphis Blues Again" (Dylan) – 9:56
6. "To Lay Me Down" (Garcia, Hunter) – 9:27
7. "Let It Grow" (Weir, Barlow) – 12:35

Disc 2

Second set:

1. "He's Gone" (Garcia, Hunter) – 10:42
2. "Looks Like Rain" (Weir, Barlow) – 9:14
3. "Terrapin Station" (Garcia, Hunter) – 13:07
4. "Drums" (Hart, Kreutzmann) – 8:52

Disc 3

1. "Space" (Garcia, Lesh, Weir) – 8:44
2. "I Will Take You Home" (Mydland, Barlow) – 5:17
3. "The Other One" (Weir, Kreutzmann) – 10:38
4. "Wharf Rat" (Garcia, Hunter) – 11:03
5. "Throwing Stones" (Weir, Barlow) – 9:46
6. "Good Lovin'" (Rudy Clark, Arthur Resnick) – 8:24

Encore:

7. "U.S. Blues" (Garcia, Hunter) – 6:08

== Personnel ==
Grateful Dead

- Jerry Garcia – guitar, vocals
- Mickey Hart – drums
- Bill Kreutzmann – drums
- Phil Lesh – bass, vocals
- Brent Mydland – keyboards, vocals
- Bob Weir – guitar, vocals

Additional musicians

- Bruce Hornsby – accordion on "Sugaree" and "Stuck Inside of Mobile with the Memphis Blues Again", accordion and keyboards on "Man Smart, Woman Smarter", accordion and vocals on "Tennessee Jed"

Production

- Produced by Grateful Dead
- Produced for release by David Lemieux
- Mixing: Jeffrey Norman
- Mastering: David Glasser
- Recording: John Cutler
- Art direction, design: Steve Vance
- Cover art, design: Justin Helton
- Liner notes essay "Brave the Storm to Come": Dean Budnick
- Executive producer: Mark Pinkus
- Associate producers: Doran Tyson, Ivette Ramos
- Tape research: Michael Wesley Johnson
- Archival research: UCSC Grateful Dead Archives
- Photographs taken from RFK Stadium, July 12, 1989, a film co-produced and directed by Len Dell'Amico

== Charts ==
Chart (2017)	Peak position
US Billboard 200	64
