= Dave's Picks Volume 39 =

Live album by Grateful Dead
- Released: July 30, 2021
- Recorded: April 26, 1983
- Venues: The Spectrum; Philadelphia
- Genre: Rock
- Length: 231:42
- Label: Rhino
- Producer: Grateful Dead

Grateful Dead chronology
Dave's Picks Volume 38 (2021)	Dave's Picks Volume 39 (2021)	Fox Theatre, St. Louis, MO 12-10-71 (2021)

Dave's Picks Volume 39 is a three-CD live album by the rock band the Grateful Dead. It contains the complete concert recorded on April 26, 1983, at the Spectrum in Philadelphia, Pennsylvania. It also includes several bonus tracks recorded at the same venue on the previous night, and at the War Memorial Auditorium in Rochester, New York earlier that month. It was released on July 30, 2021, in a limited edition of 25,000 copies.

Dave's Picks Volume 39 was the first Grateful Dead album to include the songs "Maybe You Know", written and sung by Brent Mydland, and "Little Star", written and sung by Bob Weir. It was the first of the Dave's Picks series to include the song "Shakedown Street".

== Track listing ==
Disc 1

First set:

1. "Shakedown Street" (Jerry Garcia, Robert Hunter) – 14:19
2. "New Minglewood Blues" (traditional, arranged by Grateful Dead) – 8:18
3. "They Love Each Other" (Garcia, Hunter) – 8:52
4. "Me and My Uncle" > (John Phillips) – 3:18
5. "Mexicali Blues" (Bob Weir, John Perry Barlow) – 5:41
6. "Maybe You Know" (Brent Mydland) – 5:15
7. "West L.A. Fadeaway" (Garcia, Hunter) – 7:37
8. "My Brother Esau" (Weir, Barlow) – 5:36
9. "It Must Have Been the Roses" (Hunter) – 5:27
10. "Let It Grow" (Weir, Barlow) – 12:31

Disc 2

Second set:

1. "Help on the Way" > (Garcia, Hunter) – 4:26
2. "Slipknot!" > (Garcia, Keith Godchaux, Bill Kreutzmann, Phil Lesh, Weir) – 4:36
3. "Franklin's Tower" > (Garcia, Kreutzmann, Hunter) – 9:42
4. "Man Smart, Woman Smarter" > (Norman Span) – 6:54
5. "Drums" (Mickey Hart, Kreutzmann) – 11:14

Bonus tracks – April 25, 1983, the Spectrum, Philadelphia, Pennsylvania:

6. "Space" > (Garcia, Lesh, Weir) – 10:21
7. "The Wheel" > (Garcia, Hunter) – 6:05
8. "Playing in the Band" > (Weir, Hart, Hunter) – 3:14
9. "Goin' Down the Road Feeling Bad" > (traditional, arranged by Grateful Dead) – 7:29
10. "Sugar Magnolia" (Weir, Hunter) – 8:52
11. "(I Can't Get No) Satisfaction" (Mick Jagger, Keith Richards) – 6:36

Disc 3

Second set, continued:

1. "Space" > (Garcia, Lesh, Weir) – 12:30
2. "Truckin'" > (Garcia, Lesh, Weir, Hunter) – 7:35
3. "Morning Dew" > (Bonnie Dobson, Tim Rose) – 10:30
4. "Throwing Stones" > (Weir, Barlow) – 9:41
5. "Not Fade Away" (Norman Petty, Charles Hardin) – 8:54

Encore:

6. "U.S. Blues" (Garcia, Hunter) – 5:04

Bonus tracks – April 15, 1983, War Memorial Auditorium, Rochester, New York:

7. "He's Gone" (Garcia, Hunter) – 12:40
8. "Little Star" (Weir) – 8:22

== Personnel ==
Grateful Dead

- Jerry Garcia – guitar, vocals
- Mickey Hart – drums
- Bill Kreutzmann – drums
- Phil Lesh – bass
- Brent Mydland – keyboards, vocals
- Bob Weir – guitar, vocals

Production

- Produced by Grateful Dead
- Produced for release by David Lemieux
- Mastering: Jeffrey Norman
- Cassette wow and flutter correction: Jamie Howarth
- Recording: Dan Healy
- Art direction, design: Steve Vance
- Cover art: Helen Rebecchi Kennedy
- Photos: Bob Minkin, Bobbie Bestic
- Liner notes essay: David Lemieux

== Charts ==
Dave's Picks Volume 39 was the third Dave's Picks album to reach #1 on the Billboard Top Rock Albums chart. It reached #16 on the Billboard 200 chart, the highest-ranking Grateful Dead album since In the Dark hit #6 in 1987.

Chart performance for Dave's Picks Volume 39
Chart (2021)	Peak position
US Billboard 200	16
US Top Rock Albums (Billboard)	1
