= Dick's Picks Volume 6 =

Live album by Grateful Dead
- Released: October 7, 1996
- Recorded: October 14, 1983
- Genre: Rock
- Length: 177:41
- Label: Grateful Dead

Grateful Dead chronology
Dozin' at the Knick (1996)	Dick's Picks Volume 6 (1996)	The Arista Years (1996)

Professional ratings
Review scores
Source	Rating
Allmusic	3/5 stars
The Music Box	3.5/5 stars
Rolling Stone	3/5 stars
Entertainment Weekly	C+

Dick's Picks Volume 6 is the sixth live album in the Dick's Picks series of releases by the Grateful Dead. It was recorded on October 14, 1983, at the Hartford Civic Center in Hartford, Connecticut. The album, on three CDs, contains the complete show from that night. It was released in October, 1996.

This show was the first Grateful Dead concert that Phish guitarist Trey Anastasio attended. Mike Gordon, Phish's bassist, attended separately. The album was the first to include the song "Keep Your Day Job".

== Enclosure ==
Included with the release is a single sheet folded in half, yielding a four-page enclosure. The front duplicates the cover of the CD and the back contains a black-and-white photograph of a ticket stub for the event. The two pages inside contain a wide black-and-white photograph of the band and list the contents of and credits for the release

== Caveat emptor ==
Each volume of Dick's Picks has its own "caveat emptor" label, advising the listener of the sound quality of the recording. The label for Dick's Picks Volume 6 reads:

"This compact disc has been digitally remastered directly from the original metal cassette. It is a snapshot of history, not a modern professional recording, and may therefore exhibit some technical anomalies and the unavoidable effects of the ravages of time."

== Track listing ==
Disc one

First set:

1. "Alabama Getaway" (Jerry Garcia, Robert Hunter) – 6:06 →
2. "Greatest Story Ever Told" (Bob Weir, Mickey Hart, Hunter) – 4:52
3. "They Love Each Other" (Garcia, Hunter) – 9:10
4. "Mama Tried" (Merle Haggard) – 2:48
5. "Big River" (Johnny Cash) – 6:31
6. "Althea" (Garcia, Hunter) – 8:49
7. "C.C. Rider" (Ma Rainey, Lena Arant) – 8:01
8. "Tennessee Jed" (Garcia, Hunter) – 8:33
9. "Hell in a Bucket" (Weir, John Perry Barlow) – 5:53 →
10. "Keep Your Day Job" (Garcia, Hunter) – 5:57

Disc two

Second set:

1. "Scarlet Begonias" (Garcia, Hunter) – 14:20 →
2. "Fire on the Mountain" (Hart, Hunter) – 16:36 →
3. "Estimated Prophet" (Weir, Barlow) – 13:11 →
4. "Eyes of the World" (Garcia, Hunter) – 17:53 →

Disc three

1. "Drums" (Hart, Bill Kreutzmann) – 5:25 →
2. "Spinach Jam" (Garcia, Hart, Kreutzmann, Phil Lesh, Brent Mydland, Weir) – 13:05 →
3. "The Other One" (Weir, Kreutzmann) – 6:09 →
4. "Stella Blue" (Garcia, Hunter) – 9:10 →
5. "Sugar Magnolia" (Weir, Hunter) – 9:26

Encore:

6. "U.S. Blues" (Garcia, Hunter) – 5:40

== Personnel ==
Grateful Dead

- Jerry Garcia – lead guitar, vocals
- Mickey Hart – drums
- Bill Kreutzmann – drums
- Phil Lesh – electric bass, vocals
- Brent Mydland – keyboards, vocals
- Bob Weir – guitar, vocals

Production

- Dan Healy – recording
- Dick Latvala – tape archivist
- Jeffrey Norman – CD mastering
- Michael Conway – photography
- Gecko Graphics – design
