= Dead Zone: The Grateful Dead CD Collection (1977–1987) =

Box set by Grateful Dead
- Released: 1987
- Genre: Rock
- Label: Arista

Grateful Dead chronology
In the Dark (1987)	''Dead Zone: The Grateful Dead CD Collection (1977–1987)'' (1987)	Dylan & the Dead (1989)

Professional ratings
Review scores
Source	Rating
Allmusic	3/5 stars

Dead Zone: The Grateful Dead CD Collection (1977–1987) is a six-CD boxed set retrospective of the Grateful Dead's studio and live albums during their time with Arista Records from 1977 to 1987. Prior to 1977, the band was on its own label, Grateful Dead Records.

This compilation includes the albums Terrapin Station, Shakedown Street, Go to Heaven, Reckoning, Dead Set, and In the Dark. The set does not contain any new or expanded recordings.

== Personnel ==
- Jerry Garcia – guitar, vocals
- Bob Weir – guitar, vocals
- Brent Mydland – keyboards, vocals
- Keith Godchaux – keyboards, vocals
- Donna Jean Godchaux – vocals
- Phil Lesh – bass
- Bill Kreutzmann – drums
- Mickey Hart – drums
