= Arista Years =

Arista Years may refer to:

- The Arista Years (Grateful Dead album)
- Arista Years Gong (band)
- Arista Years by The Kinks
- Arista Years 1975 - 2000 by Patti Smith
- The Best Of The Arista Years by General Johnson
