= Black Muddy River =

Song by Grateful Dead

from the album In the Dark
- Released: July 6, 1987
- Length: 5:58
- Label: Arista
- Composer: Jerry Garcia
- Lyricist: Robert Hunter
- Producers: Garcia; John Cutler

"Black Muddy River" is a song by the American rock band the Grateful Dead, released as the closing track on their twelfth studio album In the Dark (1987).

== Overview ==
Being a gospel inspired track, "Black Muddy River" has often been seen as one of Garcia and Hunter's best compositions. Hunter said of the song in a 1987 Rolling Stone interview: "Black Muddy River is about the perspective of age and making a decision about the necessity of living in spite of a rough time, and the ravages of anything else that's going to come at you. When I wrote it, I was writing about how I felt about being 45 years old and what I've been through. And then when I was done with it, obviously it was for the Dead." The song references the Thomas Moore song "To The Last Rose of Summer". Deadheads would later use it as an anthem as a wistful recollection of the halfway point in their lives. "Black Muddy River" was first performed by the Grateful Dead in December 1986. It was also one of the last songs Jerry Garcia sang live, on July 9, 1995, with the band before his death in August 1995. After keyboardist Brent Mydland's death in the summer of 1990, the band quietly retired the song, only bringing the song out on various occasions.

== Release and reception ==
"Black Muddy River" was issued as the closing track on In the Dark (1987).

In a ranking of Jerry Garcia's 50 best songs for Rolling Stone, the writers placed it at number 38, with the writers stating that "Late in life, Garcia loved nothing better than an epic melancholy ballad that spoke to his difficult journey. Few of those songs fit the bill better than In the Dark’s exquisite closer, which had the feel of a timeless folk song." In an AllMusic review, Lindsay Planer stated that "This [song] is another example of the remarkable artistic chemistry existing between Hunter and Garcia. Images such as "the last rose of summer" and "the last bolt of sunshine …" suggest an undeniable degree of finality, while the solitude of the chorus "I will walk alone by the black muddy river" suggests the perspective of a single person's journey", commenting that with the lyrics "There is an unspoken, yet tangibly haunting conviction in both his crystalline fretwork and emotive vocal delivery. The band provide an understated soulful backdrop for Garcia to animate the lyrics -- which he does with a profound synergy that is rarely found in the Dead's studio work." David Dodd said in a "Greatest Stories Ever Told" post to the band's website that "[Jerry Garcia] seems weighed down. The “muddiness” of the river, the stone / pillow confusion, the stones falling from his eyes—all literally heavy motifs, combine with the darkness (the night that will seemingly last forever…) or impending darkness (the last bolt of lightning), and the moaning of the ripples, to convey an atmosphere of sadness and hopelessness." The Ann Arbor News writer Harmen Mitchell called it a "folk gospel" song. In San Antonio Express-News, Robert Johnson wrote that it is "one of those mournful ballads that is the Dead's specialty[.]" Dale Anderson of The Buffalo News called it a "stately hymn-like number which embraces the string of mortality and finds comfort in the eternal flow" noting that Jerry Garcia's guitar solo is slow and "unadorned". Various live performances are included on the following Dead live albums:

- Grateful Dead Download Series Volume 9 (2006)
- Spring 1990 (2012)
- Spring 1990 (The Other One) (2014)
- Robert F. Kennedy Stadium, Washington, D.C., July 12 & 13, 1989 (2017)
- Enjoying the Ride (2025)
- The Music Never Stopped (2025)

The song was included on the 2015 compilation album The Best of the Grateful Dead. It was released on the box sets The Arista Years (1996), and Beyond Description (1973–1989) (2004).
