= Dylan & the Dead =

Live album by Bob Dylan and the Grateful Dead
- Released: February 6, 1989
- Recorded: July 1987
- Genres: Rock; gospel
- Length: 43:23
- Label: Columbia
- Producers: John Cutler; Jerry Garcia

Bob Dylan chronology
| Down in the Groove (1988) | Dylan & the Dead (1989) | Oh Mercy (1989) |

Grateful Dead chronology
| Dead Zone: The Grateful Dead CD Collection (1977–1987) (1987) | Dylan & the Dead (1989) | Built to Last (1989) |

Dylan & the Dead is a collaborative live album by the American singer-songwriter Bob Dylan and the American rock band the Grateful Dead, released on February 6, 1989, by Columbia Records. The album consists of seven songs written and sung by Dylan, with the Grateful Dead providing accompaniment. The album was produced by Jerry Garcia and John Cutler.

Dylan & the Dead was recorded during a successful stadium tour known as the Bob Dylan and the Grateful Dead 1987 Tour, featuring the two artists performing separately and together. Songs from two of the Grateful Dead's performances from the tour are documented on the album and video View from the Vault, Volume Four, and one of the tour-rehearsal songs is on the album Postcards of the Hanging.

Though ultimately poorly received, the album initially sold well, reaching No. 37 on the Billboard charts in the U.S., No. 38 in the UK, and earning a Gold certification in the U.S.

In 1992, a bootleg of the first concert of the tour was released under the title "Orbiting Uvula". It includes the first live performance of "Queen Jane Approximately", the first live performance of "John Brown" since 1963, and the first live performance of "Chimes of Freedom" since 1964.

== Reception ==
Professional ratings
Review scores
| Source | Rating |
|---|---|
| AllMusic | 1/5 stars |
| Robert Christgau | C− |
| The Encyclopedia of Popular Music | 1/5 stars |
| MusicHound Rock | 1.5/5 stars |
| Rolling Stone | 2.5/5 stars |

Despite strong initial sales, the album was poorly received by critics. Rolling Stone stated that the record "makes you wonder what the fuss [over the tour] was about", although they did have some kind words for several of the tracks. Writing for The Village Voice, music critic Robert Christgau said that what Dylan "makes of his catalogue here is exactly what he's been making of it for years—money". Stephen Thomas Erlewine's review for AllMusic was particularly harsh, calling it "quite possibly the worst album by either Bob Dylan or the Grateful Dead" and "a sad, disheartening document".

== Track listing ==
All tracks are written by Bob Dylan, except where noted.

Side one
| No. | Title | Recording venue and date | Length |
|---|---|---|---|
| 1. | "Slow Train" | Sullivan Stadium on July 4, 1987 | 4:54 |
| 2. | "I Want You" | Oakland Coliseum on July 24, 1987 | 3:59 |
| 3. | "Gotta Serve Somebody" | Anaheim Stadium on July 26, 1987 | 5:42 |
| 4. | "Queen Jane Approximately" | Autzen Stadium on July 19, 1987 | 6:30 |
| Total length: | | | 21:05 |

Side two
| No. | Title | Recorded | Length |
|---|---|---|---|
| 1. | "Joey" (Dylan, Jacques Levy) | Sullivan Stadium on July 4, 1987 | 9:10 |
| 2. | "All Along the Watchtower" | Anaheim Stadium on July 26, 1987 | 6:17 |
| 3. | "Knockin' on Heaven's Door" | Anaheim Stadium on July 26, 1987 | 6:51 |
| Total length: | | | 22:18 |

== Personnel ==
Musicians

- Bob Dylan – guitar, vocals
- Jerry Garcia – guitar, vocals, production
- Mickey Hart – drums
- Bill Kreutzmann – drums
- Phil Lesh – bass guitar
- Brent Mydland – keyboards, vocals
- Bob Weir – guitar, vocals

Production

- Guy Charbonneau – engineering
- John Cutler – production, engineering
- Joe Gastwirt – mastering
- Herb Greene – photography
- Rick Griffin – art direction
- Gary Hedden – engineering
- Peter Miller – engineering
- David Roberts – engineering
- Billy Rothschild – engineering
- Chris Wiskes – engineering

== Charts ==
Chart performance for Dylan & the Dead
| Chart (1989) | Peak position |
|---|---|
| Dutch Albums (Album Top 100) | 72 |
| German Albums (Offizielle Top 100) | 55 |
| Norwegian Albums (VG-lista) | 16 |
| Swedish Albums (Sverigetopplistan) | 33 |
| Swiss Albums (Schweizer Hitparade) | 29 |
| UK Albums (Official Charts) | 38 |
| US Billboard 200 | 37 |

== See also ==
- List of Grateful Dead covers
