= Herb Greene (photographer) =

American photographer (1942–2025)

- Born: April 3, 1942; Indio, California, U.S.
- Died: March 3, 2025 (aged 82); Maynard, Massachusetts, U.S.
- Other name: Herbie Greene
- Education: City College of San Francisco, San Francisco State University
- Occupation: Photographer

Herb Greene (April 3, 1942 – March 3, 2025) was an American photographer known for his portraits of musicians and bands from San Francisco's counterculture in the 1960s and 1970s. Many of his images were published by Rolling Stone, by record labels, and in books. Greene's photographed subjects include the Grateful Dead, Janis Joplin, Grace Slick, Led Zeppelin, Rod Stewart, Jeff Beck, The Pointer Sisters, Carlos Santana, and Sly Stone.

== Early life and education ==
Born April 3, 1942, in Indio in Riverside County, California, Greene grew up on his father's pear orchard in Medford, Oregon. His father traveled the West Coast selling fruit. His mother, a homemaker, could draw well, and influenced him to pursue the arts. When the family moved to Yuba City, California, Greene took a drawing class at Yuba City High School. He struggled, so when a teacher suggested photography instead, Greene enrolled in a class and bought his first camera, a 1959 Icon Contaflex. He graduated from high school in 1960. In 1961, Greene took photography classes at City College of San Francisco and later enrolled at San Francisco State University, where he majored in anthropology and communications.

== Career ==
=== 1960s San Francisco ===
Greene was part of the 1960s San Francisco art scene and a friend of many of psychedelic rock musicians of the era. His photographs are a noted record of the era and were used as cover art for several recordings including Jefferson Airplane's Surrealistic Pillow album (1967), and the Grateful Dead's In the Dark (1987), and Dylan & the Dead (1989).

After moving into an apartment near the Haight-Ashbury district, he met Jerry Garcia at a bluegrass café called the "Fox and Hound". The two became friends and Greene booked his first job, a portrait session with Garcia's band, The Warlocks (later known as the Grateful Dead). His most iconic images were photos taken between 1965 and 1966; and by 1967 Greene said the "scene was over". Many of his notable photographs were taken at his San Francisco home studio at 828 Baker Street, on the third floor.

==== Hieroglyphic wall ====
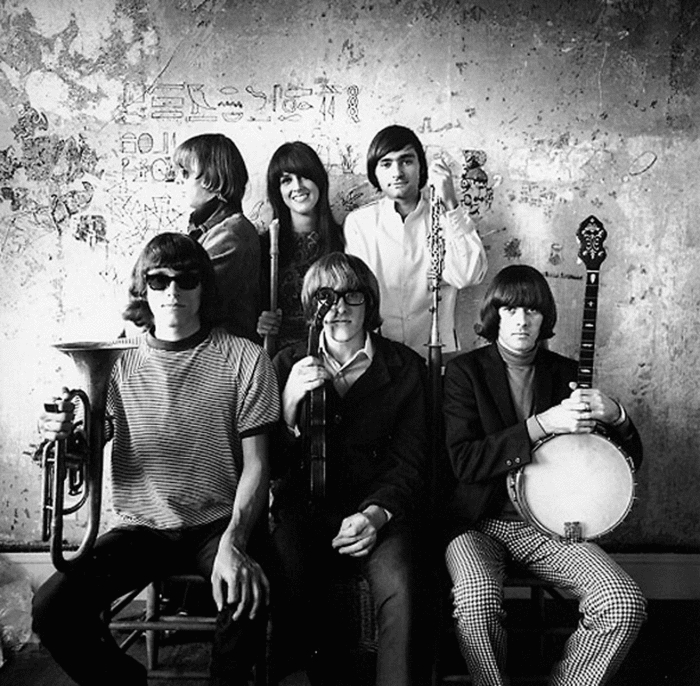
Jefferson Airplane in front of the wall; this photo is used for the cover of Surrealistic Pillow

The iconic wall of hieroglyphics used as a background for the Surrealistic Pillow cover photography along with many other famous photos of San Francisco musicians in the late 1960s was in Greene's dining room. As he removed wallpaper from the room, Greene found the phrase "Happy New Year" written on the wall. Before he had a chance to paint over it, his roommate drew the hieroglyphics which originally upset him but went on to be synonymous with the image of San Francisco psychedelic music. In a 2004 Rolling Stone interview, Grace Slick, of Jefferson Airplane, remembered Greene's dining room photo sessions: “Everybody used to go over there in front of Herbie’s wall.”

=== 1970s ===
Greene worked as a fashion and music photographer throughout the 1970s. He photographed Carlos Santana, the Pointer Sisters, Sly Stone, Dr. Hook and Chicago. In 1974, he earned a Grammy Award nomination for art direction on That's a Plenty, The Pointer Sisters’ studio album.

His work was included in the Annie Leibovitz edited book, Shooting Stars: the Rolling Stones Book of Portraits (Straight Arrow Press, 1973), alongside photographers Jim Marshall, Baron Wolman, Annie Leibovitz, Nevis Cameron, Ed Caraeff, David Gahr, Bob Seidemann, Barry Feinstein, Ethan Russell, and others.

=== 1980s ===
Greene's work with the Grateful Dead took off again in the 1980s. He shot several sessions with them, including cover art for the album In the Dark (1987) and Dylan & the Dead (1989), the band's live album with folk singer Bob Dylan. By the 1990s, Greene's portfolio had cemented his reputation as the unofficial photographer of the Grateful Dead. His portraits of the band and their 1960s contemporaries appeared in several magazines, including Rolling Stone, Relix, Newsweek and others. He also published several books of his work, including The Book of the Dead: Celebrating 25 Years with the Grateful Dead (1990), Sunshine Daydreams (1991) and Dead Days: A Grateful Dead Illustrated History (1996). After Garcia's death in August 1995, Greene went on to photograph the Grateful Dead's surviving members and their bands, including The Dead, Bob Weir and RatDog, and Further (featuring Bob Weir and Phil Lesh).

Many of his images are on display at the Rock and Roll Hall of Fame in Cleveland, Ohio.

== Publications ==
- Greene, Herb. The Book of the Dead: Celebrating 25 Years With the Grateful Dead, Delta Publishing, 1990.
- Greene, Herb. Sunshine Daydreams, Chronicle Books, 1991.
- Greene, Herb. Dead Days: A Grateful Dead Illustrated History, Acid Test Publishing, 1996.

== Personal life ==
Greene was married to Maruska Jiranek 1964-1981, ending in divorce, then married Ilze Kaneps in 1983. In 1999, Greene retired and moved to Maynard, Massachusetts a small town in the western suburbs of Boston.

Greene died on March 3, 2025, at the age of 82. He was survived by his wife, Ilze, his two daughters, and grandchildren.
