= Lost Sailor =

Song by Grateful Dead

from the album Go to Heaven
- Written: July 1979
- Released: April 28, 1980
- Length: 5:54
- Label: Arista
- Songwriters: Bob Weir; John Perry Barlow
- Producer: Gary Lyons

"Lost Sailor" is a song by American rock band the Grateful Dead. It was released on April 28, 1980, as the fifth track on the band's eleventh studio album Go to Heaven. The song was written by rhythm guitarist and vocalist Bob Weir with lyricist John Perry Barlow.

== Overview ==
According to David Dodd, "Lost Sailor" was written in Mill Valley, California, in July 1979. The song was debuted in concert on August 4, 1979, while its first performance as a pairing with "Saint of Circumstance" occurred on August 31. While the two songs were a common fixture in setlists throughout the early 1980s, "Lost Sailor" would cease to be played after 1986. "Saint of Circumstance" would continue to be performed until the band's 1995 disbandment.

"Lost Sailor" was recorded almost entirely live in the studio, with only the vocals being overdubbed. Weir stated in a 1980 column with International Musician that he recorded a live vocal during the initial take, but it needed to be re-recorded due to leakage.

Stevie Chick of The Guardian describes "Lost Sailor" as "meditative" and "melancholic", with lyrical content that sees "a disillusioned Weir recognises himself in the figure of a haggard old boatman as dedicated to the sea as the singer and guitarist is to the open road". Dodd, in a column for the band's official website, notes that both "Sailor" and "Saint" "feature a narrator who is unsure where he may be going, but seems willing to keep going nonetheless". He notes the "one distinct link" between both songs' lyrics is a reference to the Dog Star (the colloquial name for Sirius). Oliver Trager places "Lost Sailor" in a line of Weir compositions which endorse "misfit power", similarly to "Saint of Circumstance", "Feel Like a Stranger", and "Picasso Moon". Trager characterizes the narrator as "hopeful but fruitless in his attempt to touch the shore of life", with the song's "ever-shifting rhythms and melody" and "vivid nautical and seafaring lore" fitting in with the oceanic theme.

== Reception ==
"Lost Sailor" has received positive reviews from critics. After Weir's death in 2026, Chick chose the song as one of Weir's 10 best recordings. Samuel Graham and Sam Sutherland of Record World praised the song as "terrific" and felt it "more than redeem[s]" the "couple of weak tracks" found on Go to Heaven. Lindsay Planer considers "Lost Sailor" to be among the "few gems" included on Go to Heaven, stating that while its studio recording is "obviously not as thoroughly developed as it would become in concert", its "lilting melody and fluctuating tempos are reminiscent of [Weir's] 'Weather Report Suite' from the 1973 release Wake of the Flood." Conversely, in his review of its parent album, J. M. DeMatteis of Rolling Stone dismissed the track as "maundering".

Drummer Bill Kreutzmann was more critical of the song in Deal: My Three Decades of Drumming, Dreams and Drugs with the Grateful Dead, remarking that it "used to drive me nuts. The words don't get me at all... it's just not one of my favorites". Kreutzmann also recalled fellow drummer Mickey Hart would "mock the lyrics, off mic, and make all sorts of funny faces that would entertain the rest of us" while performing the song live.
