= Dead Set (album) =

Live album by the Grateful Dead
- Released: August 26, 1981
- Recorded: September 25 – October 31, 1980
- Genre: Jam rock
- Length: 73:51
- Label: Arista (original release); Rhino (2008 reissue)
- Producer: Dan Healy; Jerry Garcia; Betty Cantor-Jackson

Grateful Dead chronology
Reckoning (1981)	Dead Set (1981)	In the Dark (1987)

Professional ratings
Review scores
Source	Rating
AllMusic	2.5/5 stars

Dead Set is the seventh live album (eighteenth overall) by the Grateful Dead. It was released in August 1981 on Arista.

The album contains live material recorded between September and October 1980 at the Warfield Theatre in San Francisco and Radio City Music Hall in New York. Original CD pressings omitted the track "Space" so the entire album could fit on one CD. However, "Space" was included when the album was rereleased as part of the 2004 Beyond Description box set, as well as on one CD in 2006. The 2006 release also included a bonus CD of live material.

Dead Set is essentially a companion release to Reckoning, a 1981 release of songs featuring acoustic instruments: both of the albums were recorded at the same runs of concerts. Due to the length of the Dead's songs, several tracks from Dead Set were edited for release on vinyl, and the edited versions have been retained on CD reissues.

The album's cover features an Uncle Sam skeleton perched on the Marin Headlands looking at the view of San Francisco, with a striking twilight sky reflecting off the bay. The back cover of the original gatefold album continues this image, except that it shows a view of Manhattan and Brooklyn.

== Track listing ==
=== Original release ===
Side A
No.	Title	Writer(s)	Recording date & venue	Length
1.	"Samson and Delilah"	Trad., arr. Bob Weir	10/10/80 Warfield Theatre	5:02
2.	"Friend of the Devil"	Jerry Garcia; John Dawson; Robert Hunter	10/27/80 Radio City Music Hall	7:28
3.	"New Minglewood Blues"	Trad., arr. Grateful Dead	10/10/80 Warfield Theatre	4:41
4.	"Deal"	Garcia; Hunter	10/04/80 Warfield Theatre	4:36

Side B
No.	Title	Writer(s)	Recording date & venue	Length
5.	"Candyman"	Garcia; Hunter	10/29/80 Radio City Music Hall	7:15
6.	"Little Red Rooster"	Willie Dixon	10/29/80 Radio City Music Hall	4:31
7.	"Loser"	Garcia; Hunter	10/11/80 Warfield Theatre	5:45

Side C
No.	Title	Writer(s)	Recording date & venue	Length
8.	"Passenger"	Phil Lesh; Peter Monk	10/11/80 Warfield Theatre	3:21
9.	"Feel Like a Stranger"	Weir; John Barlow	10/04/80 Warfield Theatre	5:41
10.	"Franklin's Tower"	Garcia; Bill Kreutzmann; Hunter	10/25/80 Radio City Music Hall	5:22
11.	"Drums"	Mickey Hart; Kreutzmann	10/31/80 Radio City Music Hall	4:02

Side D
No.	Title	Writer(s)	Recording date & venue	Length
12.	"Space" (on original LP and later CD releases, not on original CD release.)	Lesh; Brent Mydland; Hart; Kreutzmann	10/31/80 Radio City Music Hall	2:29
13.	"Fire on the Mountain"	Hart; Hunter	10/31/80 Radio City Music Hall	6:30
14.	"Greatest Story Ever Told"	Hart; Weir; Hunter	10/09/80 Warfield Theatre	4:04
15.	"Brokedown Palace"	Garcia; Hunter	10/03/80 Warfield Theatre	5:42
Total length:				77:33

=== 2004 Rhino reissue bonus disc ===
No.	Title	Writer(s)	Recording date & venue	Length
1.	"Let It Grow"	Weir; Barlow	10/26/80 Radio City Music Hall	9:38
2.	"Sugaree"	Garcia; Hunter	10/26/80 Radio City Music Hall	9:51
3.	"C.C. Rider"	Trad., arr. Grateful Dead	10/13/80 Warfield Theater	7:17
4.	"Row Jimmy"	Garcia; Hunter	10/10/80 Warfield Theatre	10:14
5.	"Lazy Lightnin'"	Weir; Barlow	10/13/80 Warfield Theatre	2:53
6.	"Supplication"	Weir; Barlow	10/13/80 Warfield Theatre	5:50
7.	"High Time"	Garcia; Hunter	10/25/80 Radio City Music Hall	8:40
8.	"Jack Straw"	Weir; Hunter	10/10/80 Warfield Theatre	6:17
9.	"Shakedown Street"	Garcia; Hunter	10/07/80 Warfield Theatre	10:42
10.	"Not Fade Away"	Charles Hardin; Norman Petty	10/04/80 Warfield Theatre	4:50
Total length:				76:44

== Personnel ==
Grateful Dead

- Jerry Garcia – guitar, vocals
- Mickey Hart – drums
- Bill Kreutzmann – drums
- Phil Lesh – bass guitar
- Brent Mydland – keyboards, vocals
- Bob Weir – guitar, vocals

Production

- Dan Healy – producer
- Jerry Garcia – producer
- Betty Cantor-Jackson – producer
- Joe Gastwirt – digital remastering
- Don Pearson – engineering
- John Cutler – engineering
- Dennis Leonard – engineering
- Dennis Larkins – cover illustration
- John Werner – centerfold photography
- Jim Welch – album jacket production

== Recording dates ==
Dead Set was recorded during the same shows as Reckoning.

- October 3, 1980 Warfield Theatre: "Brokedown Palace"
- October 4, 1980 Warfield Theatre: "Deal", "Feel Like a Stranger", and "Not Fade Away"
- October 7, 1980 Warfield Theatre: "Shakedown Street"
- October 9, 1980 Warfield Theatre: "Greatest Story Ever Told"
- October 10, 1980 Warfield Theatre: "Samson and Delilah", "New Minglewood Blues", "Row Jimmy", and "Jack Straw"
- October 11, 1980 Warfield Theatre: "Loser" and "Passenger"
- October 13, 1980 Warfield Theatre: "C.C. Rider", "Lazy Lightnin', and "Supplication"
- October 25, 1980 Radio City Music Hall: "Franklin's Tower" and "High Time"
- October 26, 1980 Radio City Music Hall: "Let It Grow" and "Sugaree"
- October 27, 1980 Radio City Music Hall: "Friend of the Devil"
- October 29, 1980 Radio City Music Hall: "Candyman" and "Little Red Rooster"
- October 31, 1980 Radio City Music Hall: "Rhythm Devils", "Space", and "Fire on the Mountain"

== Charts ==
Album—Billboard

Year	Chart	Position
1981	Pop Albums	29
