= I Need a Miracle (Grateful Dead song) =

Song by Grateful Dead

from the album Shakedown Street
- Released: November 8, 1978
- Length: 3:36
- Label: Arista
- Songwriters: Bob Weir; John Perry Barlow
- Producer: Lowell George

"I Need a Miracle" is a song by the American rock band Grateful Dead, released as the sixth track on the band's tenth studio album Shakedown Street (1978).

== Overview ==
Initially, "I Need a Miracle" seems to be the narrator making fun of himself, but, as David Dodd wrote in a blog article about the song on the band's website, the line "It takes dynamite to get me up... too much of everything is just enough," is "A nice turn of phrase[, as t]he miraculous is synonymous with the excessive, the transcendent with the hyperbolic and overblown." Dodd also wrote in the same article that "the lyrics seem to me to be something Barlow might have written to one-up the image of women in other Dead songs, notably in “Sugar Magnolia.” Or it may have been an attempt to get away with the kind of sexism that doomed “Money Money” from the get-go." According to Oliver Trager, "This hard-rockin', hard-livin' rant found its place at Dead concerts, materializing out of "Space" and signaling the final rush to the last phase of the show." The song features Kingfish member Matthew Kelly on harmonica.

== Critical reception ==
In a review for AllMusic, Lindsay Planer wrote that "the lyrics deal in a rather tongue-in-cheek manner on the subject of overindulgence", noting that "In contrast to Weir’s earlier compositions – such as "Cassidy" and "Looks Like Rain" – "I Need a Miracle" is edgier, pointing the way for even more provocative material such as “Victim or the Crime”. This is matched sonically by Jerry Garcia’s stirring and aggressive fretwork." In a ranking of the band's 100 best songs, Steve Bloom of Rolling Stone placed it at number 99, stating "But the lyrics that precede that (penned by Barlow) are head-scratchers about a man seeking a woman" noting that for the instrumentation, "Garcia takes a nimble midsection solo, and Matthew Kelly adds harmonica wails worthy of the late Pigpen." The song was included on the second disc of the 2015 compilation album The Best of the Grateful Dead. In 1996, the song was included on The Arista Years as the eighth track.

== In Deadhead culture ==
Soon after the song's release on Shakedown Street, fans began using the song to refer to when a broke fan of Grateful Dead wants a ticket to one of their concerts, where they would often state they needed a "Miracle ticket" as a reference to the song.
