= West L.A. Fadeaway =

Song by Grateful Dead

from the album In the Dark
- A-side: "Hell in a Bucket"
- Released: July 6, 1987
- Genre: Jazz; rhythm and blues
- Length: 6:39
- Label: Arista
- Composer: Jerry Garcia
- Lyricist: Robert Hunter
- Producers: Garcia; John Cutler

"West L.A. Fadeaway" is a song by the American rock band the Grateful Dead, released as the fourth track on their twelfth studio album In the Dark (1987).

== Overview ==
While Grateful Dead lyricist Robert Hunter never confirmed it, Deadheads have associated "West L.A. Fadeaway" with the effect L.A. has had on some of its notable residents. The lyric "looking for a chateau" is a reference to the Chateau Marmont, a hotel on the Sunset Strip in L.A. People have also believed it to be about the death of John Belushi. The Dead first performed the song live in late August 1982, five years before the In the Dark studio version of the song was released. Hunter said of the song: "I think the initial hit on that was the old song—not the one I wrote—that goes "'stop on the red and go on the green but get my candyman home salty dog, candyman salty dog, candyman."' I liked that; it was 120 Goin' Down the Road catchy. Little bits of old folk songs have a way of getting into my songs. But then I put that one on an L.A. freeway.", Hunter also said he was out to make a "real bad character, which is kind of what I consider an L.A. way of looking at things." Shortly before Belushi died, he attended a Grateful Dead concert. During a concert on March 30, 1980, Belushi showed up during the encore and started doing cartwheels. Early live performances of the song included an extra verse that was dropped at some point which mentioned a woman named Ginger who would follow the golden rule.

== Release and reception ==
"West L.A. Fadeaway" was issued as the fourth track on the Dead's album In the Dark (1987).

The song was generally well-received. In a ranking of the Dead's 100 best songs, it was placed at number 84 by Rolling Stone, with Michaelangelo Matos opining it "rides a far slipperier groove, with buoyant percussion touches and the synthesizers more fully integrated into the Dead’s sound." Writing for AllMusic, Lindsay Planer wrote that "listeners are reminded of the tragic fate that befell fellow Deadhead actor/musician John Belushi. The opening lines... are hauntingly familiar of the circumstances surrounding his passing." In Spin magazine, Billy Altman wrote that Jerry Garcia's guitar can "catch you unaware", adding that "Whether he's darting or weaving the arrangement, as he does on "Touch of Grey", concluding stating "Garcia keeps surprising with an almost offhanded dexterity that can only be attributed to the fact that he's been doing this for the rock 'n' roll equivalent of a millennium." The Ann Arbor News' Harbor Mitchell called it a "classic dead boogie". The Buffalo News writer Dale Anderson likened the track to a song by J.J. Cole, believing it "sparkles like asphalt like woodblock and triangle overdubs", adding that "Garcia throws out blues lines just for the coolness of their attitude".

Some reviews were less enthusiastic. San Antonio Express-News writer Robert Johnson wrote: "The sinister R&B of "West L.A. Fadeaway" would have been better served had the song been shortened, but then brevity has never been a Dead strong point." The Houston Chronicle writer Marty Racine called it a "quiet, unassuming number with little punch." The Rockford Register Star's writer John Collinge called it the "perhaps the album's most obvious filler piece, degenerating into the dreary noodling for which the Dead, at their worst, can be notorious."

Live performances of "West L.A. Fadeaway" have appeared on the following Grateful Dead live albums:

- View from the Vault III (2002)
- View from the Vault IV (2003)
- Spring 1990 (2012)
- Spring 1990: So Glad You Made It (2012)
- Complete Live Rarities Collection (2013)
- Giants Stadium 1987, 1989, 1991 (2019)
- Dave's Picks Volume 36 (2020)
- Dave's Picks Volume 39 (2021)
- In and Out of the Garden: Madison Square Garden '81, '82, '83 (2022)
- Dave's Picks Volume 44 (2022)
- Dave's Picks Volume 52 (2024)
- Summer Magic 1985 (2026)

== Charts ==
Weekly chart performance for "West L.A. Fadwaway"
Chart (1987)	Position
US Mainstream Rock (Billboard)	40
