= Picasso Moon =

Song by Grateful Dead

from the album Built to Last
- Released: October 31, 1989
- Length: 6:40
- Label: Arista
- Songwriters: Bob Weir; Bob Bralove; John Perry Barlow
- Producers: John Cutler; Jerry Garcia

"Picasso Moon" is a song by the American rock band Grateful Dead, released as the eighth track on their thirteenth and final studio album Built to Last (1989).

== Background and composition ==
Credited to Bob Weir, John Perry Barlow and Bob Bralove, "Picasso Moon" began in the studio one day when Weir randomly said "Picasso moon" before commenting that he didn't know why he said that, it kept bothering him so much that he almost fell off of his bike, as he mentioned during an interview included with a promotional, not-for-sale copy of the album. Weir, alongside Barlow, and Bralove kept writing the song between February and May of 1989. Weir had initially written the music to another set of lyrics, but when Brent Mydland wrote a new arrangement for those lyrics, as Weir told Blair Jackson, "So I took the music and went on a vision quest— I went on a good, long bicycle ride is what it amounted to, and in the middle of it, I came up with what I wanted the song to be about."

== Release and reception ==
In a review of Road Trips Vol 2. No. 4 for the Music Box, John Metzger writes that "although Picasso Moon was laced with an inspired guitar accompaniment from Garcia, there’s still no way of denying the fact that it is one of the lesser tunes in the collective’s repertoire." John Metzger also mentioned in Built to Last review for the Music Box, he called it "edgy", noting that "the Grateful Dead never sounded comfortable performing it". The song has been performed at least 80 times, with live performances being released on the following live albums:

- Nightfall of Diamonds (2001)
- Road Trips: Vol 2, No. 1 Bonus CD (2008)
- Road Trips: Vol 2, No. 4 Bonus CD (2009)
- Spring 1990 (2012)
- Spring 1990 (The Other One) (2014)
- Giants Stadium 1987, 1989, 1991 (2019)
- Dave's Picks Volume 40 (2021)
- Enjoying the Ride (2015)
- Dave's Picks Volume 55 (2025)
- Dave's Picks Volume 59 (2026)
