= Built to Last (Grateful Dead song) =

Song by Grateful Dead

from the album Built to Last
- Released: October 31, 1989
- Length: 5:03
- Label: Arista
- Composer: Jerry Garcia
- Lyricist: Robert Hunter
- Producers: Garcia; John Cutler

"Built to Last" is a song by the American rock band Grateful Dead, released as the third track on their thirteenth and final studio album Built to Last (1989). It has the distinction of being one of only four tracks to be a title track of a Grateful Dead album, as well as one of the final Garcia-Hunter compositions released on one of their albums.

== Background and composition ==
"Built to Last" was debuted at a fall 1988 concert in the southern part of the United States. "Built to Last" was written as a slow-tempo retrospective that many believe is either about the group's durability, or a close relationship. The lyrics contain references to "Here Comes the Sun" by the Beatles and possibly "All My Trials". As Garcia said about Hunter's contributions to the song:

He's very good at being able to make something sound like it almost says something. The song almost says something and it has places that are clearer than others. It's my favorite kind of song. You listen to it, but you don't know what it's about. The more you listen, the less you know.

— Jerry Garcia, on Robert Hunter's contributions to "Built to Last", 1989 Interview

== Release and reception ==
In a review for the song on AllMusic, Lindsey Planer states that "Hunter’s trademark brilliant wordplay and insightful ambiguity is one of the most endearing features of "Built To Last"", noting that "The highly affable melody chugs along at an unhurried pace allowing for Hunter's cerebral verses and haiku-esque chorus to unravel in much the same way as the Blues For Allah tune "Crazy Fingers"." On July 5, 2014, when the surviving members of the group performed together for the last time, one of the songs they played was "Built to Last".
