= Standing on the Moon =

Song by Grateful Dead

from the album Built to Last
- Released: October 31, 1989
- Length: 5:20
- Label: Arista
- Composer: Jerry Garcia
- Lyricist: Robert Hunter
- Producers: Garcia; John Cutler

"Standing on the Moon" is a song by the American rock band Grateful Dead, released as the seventh track on their thirteenth studio album Built to Last (1989). It is a political love song, and one of three songs on Built to Last credited to Garcia–Hunter, a composer/lyricist duo consisting of Jerry Garcia and Robert Hunter.

== Background and composition ==
"Standing on the Moon" was written by Jerry Garcia and Robert Hunter, with the lyrics being a love song with references to various historical moments. AllMusic critic Lindsay Planer notes that during the chorus, Hunter's lyrics "quickly [do] a 180 by turning the subject matter inward with the resolving couplets". Many critics, as well as Garcia and Hunter themselves have called it their favorite, and one of the best songs on Built to Last. Hunter said of "Standing on the Moon" to Blair Jackson: "'Standing on the Moon' was one of those neat, sweet quick things, like 'It Must Have Been the Roses,' where the whole picture just came to me, and I grabbed a piece of paper and got it down. No changes, no nothin'." Garcia also told Jackson that "I thought it would be really nice to do a song that you only have to hear one time and you'll get it. You don’t have to listen to it hundreds of times or wonder what it’s about... . There’s something I like about it very much. It’s an emotional reality; it isn’t linguistics. It’s something about that moment of the soul. To have those words coming out of my mouth puts me in a very specific place, and there’s a certain authenticity there that I didn’t want to disturb."

== Release and reception ==
In a ranking of Garcia's 50 best songs, Rolling Stone placed it at number 45, noting that it features "perhaps Garcia’s finest latter-day vocal", adding that "But Garcia, working from a sensitive Hunter lyric about a homesick space traveler, transcended — or utilized — those troubles to sing with heartbreaking poignancy." Garcia called it "one of those perfect songs.", noting that "I wanted to keep it just as close to the bone as possible, I didn’t want to hear any solo voices in it, I didn’t want to hear any suspended chords, I only wanted to hear pure triads; 1 wanted to hear the emotion just as pure as it could be." "Standing on the Moon" was included on the 2015 compilation The Best of the Grateful Dead, and was included as the last track on the compilation.

== Cover versions ==
The music group Phosphorescent & Friends performed a cover version of "Standing on the Moon" for the 2016 Day of the Dead Grateful Dead tribute album.
