= Built to Last =

1989 album by the Grateful Dead

Studio album by Grateful Dead
- Released: October 31, 1989
- Recorded: February 1 – October 20, 1989
- Studios: Club Front (San Rafael, CA); Skywalker Ranch (San Rafael, CA); Studio X (Petaluma, CA)
- Genres: Pop rock; roots rock
- Length: 49:52
- Label: Arista
- Producers: John Cutler; Jerry Garcia

Grateful Dead chronology
Dylan & The Dead (1989)	Built to Last (1989)	Without a Net (1990)

Singles from Built to Last
- 1. "Foolish Heart" Released: October 12, 1989

Professional ratings
Review scores
Source	Rating
AllMusic	2/5 stars
Robert Christgau	C+

Built to Last is the thirteenth and final studio album by the Grateful Dead (their twenty-first album overall). It was recorded between February 1 and October 20, 1989, and released on October 31, 1989.

The album was released on CD in 1989 by Arista Records before being rereleased in 2000 by BMG International. It was then remastered, expanded, and released as part of the Beyond Description (1973–1989) 12-CD box set in October 2004. The remastered version was later released separately on CD on April 11, 2006, by Rhino Records.

This album features the most songs by keyboard player Brent Mydland, who has four song credits, all of which are in collaboration with Dead lyricist John Perry Barlow. This mirrored accurately Mydland's increasing vocal presence in the band over the decade he spent with the Dead. This album was Mydland's last album to be released during his lifetime, before his death a year later.

== Track listing ==
CD track listing
No.	Title	Writer(s)	Lead Singer	Length
1.	"Foolish Heart"	Jerry Garcia; Robert Hunter	Garcia	5:10
2.	"Just a Little Light"	Brent Mydland; John Barlow	Mydland	4:42
3.	"Built to Last"	Garcia; Hunter	Garcia	5:03
4.	"Blow Away"	Mydland; Barlow	Mydland	6:09
5.	"Victim or the Crime"	Bob Weir; Gerrit Graham	Weir	7:33
6.	"We Can Run"	Mydland; Barlow	Mydland	5:30
7.	"Standing on the Moon"	Garcia; Hunter	Garcia	5:20
8.	"Picasso Moon"	Weir; Bob Bralove; Barlow	Weir	6:40
9.	"I Will Take You Home"	Mydland; Barlow	Mydland	3:45
Total length:				49:52

LP track listing – side one
No.	Title	Length
1.	"Foolish Heart"	5:10
2.	"Just a Little Light"	4:42
3.	"Victim or the Crime"	7:33
4.	"Standing on the Moon"	5:20

LP track listing – side two
No.	Title	Length
1.	"Blow Away"	6:09
2.	"Picasso Moon"	6:40
3.	"Built to Last"	5:03
4.	"I Will Take You Home"	3:45

2004 reissue bonus tracks
No.	Title	Writer(s)	Lead vocals	Length
10.	"Foolish Heart" (live 7/19/89)			11:30
11.	"Blow Away" (live 7/7/89)			12:02
12.	"California Earthquake (Whole Lotta Shakin' Goin' On)" (live 10/20/89)	Rodney Crowell	Garcia	5:59

== Personnel ==
Grateful Dead:

- Jerry Garcia – guitar, vocals
- Bob Weir – guitar, vocals
- Brent Mydland – keyboards, vocals
- Phil Lesh – bass
- Bill Kreutzmann – drums
- Mickey Hart – drums, percussion

Production:

- John Cutler – producer, engineer
- Tom Flye – engineer
- Justin Kreutzmann – engineer
- Peter Miller – engineer
- David Roberts – engineer
- Jeff Sterling – engineer
- Chris Wiskes – engineer

=== Bonus tracks production ===
- "Foolish Heart" – recorded live at Alpine Valley Music Theater in East Troy, WI on July 19, 1989 (see also Fallout from the Phil Zone & Downhill from Here for more from this date)
- "Blow Away" – recorded live at John F. Kennedy Stadium in Philadelphia on July 7, 1989 (later released with full concert on Crimson White & Indigo)
- "California Earthquake (Whole Lotta Shakin' Goin' On)" – recorded live at The Spectrum in Philadelphia on October 20, 1989

=== Reissue production ===
- David Lemieux – reissue producers
- James Austin – reissue producers
- Reggie Collins – liner notes
- Blair Jackson – liner notes
- Sheryl Farber – editorial supervision
- Cameron Sears – executive producer
- Joe Gastwirt – mastering, production consultant
- Tom Flye – mixing
- Robert Gatley – mixing assistant
- Hugh Brown, Steve Vance – art coordinator
- Jimmy Edwards – associate producer
- Robin Hurley – associate producer
- Hale Milgrim – associate producer
- Scott Pascucci – associate producer
- Eileen Law – research
- Vanessa Atkins – project assistant
- Steven Chean – project assistant
- Bill Inglot – project assistant
- Jeffrey Norman – project assistant
- Randy Perry – project assistant
- John McEntire – coordination
- Ken Friedman – photography
- Herbert Greene – photography
- Maude Gilman – artwork
- Greg Gyuricsko – artwork
- Dan Healy – concert sound
- Alton Kelley – direction, cover art
- John McEntire – coordination
- Billy Candelario – crew
- Steve Parish – crew
- Harry Popick – crew
- Robbie Taylor – crew

== Charts ==
Album – Billboard

Year	Chart	Position
1989	The Billboard 200	27

Singles – Billboard

Year	Single	Chart	Position
1989	"Foolish Heart"	Mainstream Rock Tracks	8

RIAA Certification

Certification	Date
Gold	January 3, 1990
