= In the Dark (Grateful Dead album) =

Studio album by Grateful Dead
- Released: July 6, 1987
- Recorded: January 6–13, 1987
- Studios: Marin Veterans Memorial Auditorium, San Rafael, California
- Genres: Blues rock; roots rock; pop rock
- Length: 40:37
- Label: Arista
- Producers: Jerry Garcia; John Cutler

Grateful Dead chronology
| Dead Set (1981) | In the Dark (1987) | Dead Zone: The Grateful Dead CD Collection (1977–1987) (1987) |

Singles from In the Dark
- 1. "Touch of Grey" Released: June 16, 1987; 2. "Throwing Stones" Released: November 1987

Professional ratings
Review scores
| Source | Rating |
|---|---|
| AllMusic | 4/5 stars |
| Robert Christgau | C+ |
| Rolling Stone | Favorable |

In the Dark is the twelfth studio album (nineteenth overall) by American rock band the Grateful Dead. It was released on July 6, 1987, by Arista Records.

In the Dark was the band's first album in six years, and their first studio album since 1980's Go to Heaven. It became unexpectedly popular, achieving double platinum certification in the U.S. It reached No. 6 on the Billboard 200 chart, the Grateful Dead's only top ten album. "Touch of Grey" peaked at No. 9 on the Billboard Hot 100, the band's only top forty single; it also became a frequently played music video on MTV. "Hell in a Bucket" and "Throwing Stones" (for which videos were also made) also achieved significant album-oriented rock radio airplay.

== Production ==
In the Dark was recorded between January 6 and 13, 1987, at Marin Veterans Memorial Auditorium, San Rafael, California, with production by Jerry Garcia and John Cutler.

Most of the songs had been played by the Dead since 1982 or 1983. Since the band had been playing the songs for some time, they decided to record basic tracks for the album in a darkened theater with no audience, on a stage with the same lighting as they would use on tour, so that the band could perform in a more comfortable, familiar setting. The idea was to capture the "feel" they had for the songs as if they were playing them to a live audience.

Drummer Bill Kreutzmann reminisced, "We ran all the electric instruments through amplifiers in the basement, in isolation rooms, and kept the drums bright and loud on stage. Everything was fed to a recording truck parked outside the venue. Everybody played their parts in real time, together. When we took breaks, we'd go into the wings by the stage door and sit there and talk about what we'd just done. Talking about the music, then going right out to play the music, then talking about it some more was something that we really should've done more often — the analysis served the songs and the camaraderie served the band. It really put us in a good spot."

They then brought these recorded tracks to the studio and, if needed, made additional overdub recordings to fix minor problems with instrumental or vocal parts.

Garcia spoke about the recording in an interview; "Marin Vets turns out to be an incredibly nice room to record in. There's something about the formal atmosphere in there that makes us work. When we set up at Front Street to work, a lot of times we just sort of dissolve into hanging out. Going in Marin Vets without an audience and playing just to ourselves was in the nature of an experiment."

== Release ==
In the Dark was released on CD in 1987 by Arista Records before being re-released in 2000 by BMG International. It was then remastered, expanded, and released with new cover art as part of the Beyond Description (1973–1989) 12-CD box set in October 2004. The remastered version was later released separately on CD, on April 11, 2006, by Rhino Records.

The cover art for the album was designed by Randy Tuten. The lettering forms the shape of an eye. Inside the lettering are photos of the band members' eyes. On the original LP, the photos were right side up, but when the album was released on CD in 1987, the photos were upside down. Though the band joked that the extra eye belonged to the Ayatollah Khomeini, it actually belonged to their long-time promoter, Bill Graham.

== Track listing ==
Side one
| No. | Title | Writer(s) | Lead vocals | Length |
|---|---|---|---|---|
| 1. | "Touch of Grey" | Jerry Garcia; Robert Hunter | Garcia | 5:47 |
| 2. | "Hell in a Bucket" | Bob Weir; Brent Mydland; John Perry Barlow | Weir | 5:35 |
| 3. | "When Push Comes to Shove" | Garcia; Hunter | Garcia | 4:05 |
| 4. | "West L.A. Fadeaway" | Garcia; Hunter | Garcia | 6:39 |
| Total length: | | | | 22:06 |

Side two
| No. | Title | Writer(s) | Lead vocals | Length |
|---|---|---|---|---|
| 5. | "Tons of Steel" | Mydland | Mydland | 5:15 |
| 6. | "Throwing Stones" | Weir; Barlow | Weir | 7:18 |
| 7. | "Black Muddy River" | Garcia; Hunter | Garcia | 5:58 |
| Total length: | | | | 18:31 |

Beyond Description reissue bonus tracks
| No. | Title | Writer(s) | Lead vocals | Length |
|---|---|---|---|---|
| 8. | "My Brother Esau" (single B-side) | Weir; Barlow | Weir | 4:17 |
| 9. | "West L.A. Fadeaway" (alternate version, recorded 1984-03 Fantasy Studios, Berkeley, CA) | Garcia; Hunter | Garcia | 7:09 |
| 10. | "Black Muddy River" (studio outtake, recorded 1986-12-05 Club Front, San Rafael, CA) | Garcia; Hunter | Garcia | 5:41 |
| 11. | "When Push Comes to Shove" (studio outtake, recorded 1986-12-05 Club Front, San Rafael, CA) | Garcia; Hunter | Garcia | 4:22 |
| 12. | "Touch of Grey" (studio outtake, recorded 1982-08 Club Front, San Rafael, CA) | Garcia; Hunter | Garcia | 5:47 |
| 13. | "Throwing Stones" (live, recorded 1987-07-04 Sullivan Stadium, Foxboro, MA) | Weir; Barlow | Weir | 9:36 |
| Total length: | | | | 77:29 |

Note: "My Brother Esau" (written by Weir and Barlow), the B-side of the "Touch of Grey" single, was omitted from the LP and CD releases of In the Dark, but was included on the cassette as the fourth track.

== Personnel ==
=== Grateful Dead ===
- Jerry Garcia – guitar, vocals
- Bob Weir – guitar, vocals
- Brent Mydland – keyboards, vocals
- Phil Lesh – bass
- Bill Kreutzmann – drums
- Mickey Hart – drums, percussion

=== Production ===
- Bob Bralove – programming, special effects, spatialization
- Guy Charbonneau – engineer
- Dan Healy – engineer
- Jeffrey Norman – engineer
- David Roberts – engineer
- Jeff Sterling – engineer
- John Cutler – producer, engineer
- Gail Grant – design
- Herb Greene – art direction, photography
- Randy Tuten – cover art

=== Bonus tracks production ===
- "My Brother Esau" – single B-side, recorded on January 15, 1987
- "West L.A. Fadeaway" – alternate version, recorded in March 1984
- "Black Muddy River" – studio outtake recorded on December 5, 1986
- "When Push Comes To Shove" – studio outtake recorded on December 5, 1986
- "Touch Of Grey" – studio outtake recorded in August 1982
- "Throwing Stones" – recorded live at Sullivan Stadium in Foxboro, MA on July 4, 1987

=== Reissue production ===
- David Lemieux – reissue producer
- James Austin – reissue producer
- Reggie Collins – liner notes
- Dennis McNally – liner notes
- Sheryl Farber – editorial supervision
- Cameron Sears – executive producer
- Joe Gastwirt – mastering, production consultant
- Tom Flye – mixing
- Robert Gatley – mixing assistant
- Hugh Brown, Steve Vance – art coordinator
- Jimmy Edwards – associate producer
- Robin Hurley – associate producer
- Hale Milgrim – associate producer
- Scott Pascucci – associate producer
- Eileen Law – research
- Vanessa Atkins – project assistant
- Steven Chean – project assistant
- Bill Inglot – project assistant
- Randy Perry – project assistant
- Tom Ingalls – design
- Justin Kreutzmann- engineer
- John McEntire – coordination
- Susana Millman – photography
- John Werner – photography

== Charts ==
=== Weekly charts ===
| Chart (1987) | Peak position |
|---|---|
| Canada Top Albums/CDs (RPM) | 12 |
| UK Albums (Official Charts) | 57 |
| US Billboard 200 | 6 |

=== Year-end charts ===
| Chart (1987) | Position |
|---|---|
| Canada Top Albums/CDs (RPM) | 67 |
| US Billboard 200 | 95 |

Singles - Billboard

| Year | Single | Chart | Position |
|---|---|---|---|
| 1987 | "Touch of Grey" | Mainstream Rock Tracks | 1 |
| 1987 | "Touch of Grey" | The Billboard Hot 100 | 9 |
| 1987 | "Touch of Grey" | Adult Contemporary | 15 |
| 1987 | "Hell in a Bucket" | Mainstream Rock Tracks | 3 |
| 1987 | "West L.A. Fadeaway" | Mainstream Rock Tracks | 40 |
| 1987 | "Throwing Stones" | Mainstream Rock Tracks | 15 |

== Certifications ==
Certifications for In the Dark
| Region | Certification | Certified units/sales |
|---|---|---|
| Canada (Music Canada) | Platinum | 100,000^{^} |
| United States (RIAA) | 2× Platinum | 2,000,000^{^} |
^{^} Shipments figures based on certification alone.
