= Go to Heaven =

Studio album by Grateful Dead
- Released: April 28, 1980
- Recorded: July 1979 – January 1980
- Studios: Club Front, San Rafael, CA
- Genres: Blues rock; roots rock; pop rock
- Length: 38:19
- Label: Arista
- Producer: Gary Lyons

Grateful Dead chronology
Shakedown Street (1978)	Go to Heaven (1980)	Reckoning (1981)

Singles from Go to Heaven
- 1. "Alabama Getaway" Released: April 28, 1980; 2. "Don't Ease Me In" Released: August 1980

Go to Heaven is the eleventh studio album (sixteenth overall) by rock band the Grateful Dead, released April 28, 1980, by Arista Records. It is the band's first album with keyboardist Brent Mydland. Go to Heaven was both the third Grateful Dead studio album in a row to use an outside producer, this time Gary Lyons, and the last studio album for over seven years.

== Recording ==
Keyboardist Keith Godchaux and vocalist Donna Godchaux left the Grateful Dead in February 1979 and were replaced in both positions by Brent Mydland. While in the band Silver, Mydland had performed on the hit pop song "Wham Bam Shang-a-Lang", also playing and writing tracks for that band's 1976 country rock album. Following that, he toured with Grateful Dead rhythm guitarist Bob Weir's solo band Bobby and the Midnites.

The Grateful Dead were contractually obligated to record another studio album before they could release live material. As with the previous two albums, they used an outside producer, per an agreement with Clive Davis, and in the hope of a more mainstream production with greater commercial potential (and perhaps a hit single). Davis sent British producer Gary Lyons, who was known for his success with Foreigner's debut album. With track construction stretching past a couple months, Lyons simultaneously began working with Aerosmith, taking over the production of Night in the Ruts. He commuted between California and New York, trading off with assistant producer Peter Thea.

The album was recorded at the band's own studio; however, as happened while finishing Terrapin Station, overdubs were made in New York City (at Media Sound) while the Dead toured the region. Instead of compiling different takes of a solo, as with other productions, Lyons learned to keep the sequences whole. According to recording engineer Betty Cantor-Jackson, "Jerry's sitting there and Gary says, 'Well, what do you think?' And Jerry says, 'I wouldn't play it that way.' It was true, because his style had a certain logic to it and there were certain ways he put together notes, the sequence of notes, which had to do with the way he thought about music. So to cut that up it no longer sounded the way Jerry thought."

I think of recording as sort of a necessary evil in a way.

— Jerry Garcia (1980)

Bob Weir had a greater influence than on previous studio albums, writing three of the songs, with his lyricist John Barlow. Both "Lost Sailor" and "Saint of Circumstance" mention sails and navigation, and reference the Dog Star. They were usually played live as a pair. Jerry Garcia brought just two songs to the album. Both were composed with his writing partner Robert Hunter: the lyrically obscure, Berry-esque rocker, "Alabama Getaway" and the meticulously arranged "Althea". Hunter said the title character of the latter was inspired by Minerva. A third Garcia-Hunter effort, "What'll You Raise," was not recorded to the guitarist's satisfaction during the sessions after failing to enter their live rotation; it was ultimately released as a bonus track on the album's 2004/2006 reissue. Mydland's "Far from Me" and "Easy to Love You" were written for Weir's band but Garcia encouraged him to present them to the Dead. The second had lyric additions by Barlow (at the behest of Davis). Unlike the songs Weir and Garcia brought, Mydland wrote straightforward pop songs, usually with a lyrical focus on unrequited love. He also brought synthesizers to the Dead, playing a Minimoog solo on "Alabama Getaway" and a Prophet-5 on Weir's funk-incorporating "Feel Like a Stranger".

Folk standard "Don't Ease Me In" had been played in the band's former incarnation as Mother McCree's Uptown Jug Champions, and was the A-side of the first Grateful Dead single. It had re-entered their live set lists shortly before the addition of Mydland. As with the previous two albums, drummers Bill Kreutzmann and Mickey Hart contributed an instrumental, "Antwerp's Placebo (The Plumber)". The subtitle was Hart's taunt at Lyons, who had worked as a plumber. To tighten the beat, Lyons had focused on one drummer, keeping mostly Kreutzmann's work in the mix. Weir also disagreed with the stylized, abrupt ending to "Feel Like a Stranger", but he worked with Lyons again the following year for his Bobby and the Midnites project.

Garcia had band sound man Dan Healy set up a low wattage radio transmitter so he could drive around the neighborhood and listen to how the production would sound on a car radio. Go to Heaven would be the last Grateful Dead studio album for seven years, though there was an aborted attempt four years later.

== Release ==
Though Go to Heaven fared better on the charts than the previous two albums, ultimately sales were disappointing, due in part to the cover art. In an era when album artwork affected sales, the band, according to band chronicler Blair Jackson, looked like "hippie versions of John Travolta in Saturday Night Fever." The front cover of a Grateful Dead album had never had a straightforward band photo (they had appeared obliquely on the cover of Workingman's Dead, in costume and within the context of the album's theme, and on their first album as part of a collage). The turn away from highly recognizable psychedelic and illustrated artwork implied the same for the music within. Worse, to rock fans and Deadheads, was the connotation with disco, represented by the tailored white suits the band wore in the photo.

The Dead in white suits... only served to make them look silly and stodgy in an era when they were already being seen by more and more people as a dinosaur band—exactly what the New Wave was trying to wash away. —Blair Jackson

However, this was not the intention. Weir had titled the album and his original idea for the back cover was to have the white suits in rags, with the scraggly band lying among empty wine bottles, to convey the joke "Go to Heaven/Go to Hell". With the back cover illustrated instead with a somewhat nondescript phoenix, the humorous dichotomy and winking irony were lost and some buyers mistakenly assumed the Dead were committing to disco – even though much of the album returned to the rock and blues of the band's previous releases. The band had flirted with the style on singles from the last two albums. In the meantime there had been a large disco backlash. The genre was already considered in decline and radio formats had separated disco from rock music.

Two singles were released from Go to Heaven: "Alabama Getaway" and "Don't Ease Me In". Both were backed with "Far from Me". The first was a minor hit, finding airplay in some markets. To promote the upcoming album and single, the Grateful Dead again appeared on Saturday Night Live, playing "Alabama Getaway" and "Saint of Circumstance". The show's writers, Al Franken and Tom Davis, were Deadheads and Kreutzmann was friends with the show's John Belushi, who had appeared onstage with the Dead earlier in the week.

Except for the interstitial instrumental, all of the new songs were played live, premiering between the start of recording and the album's release. Mydland's songs remained during his tenure, with "Easy to Love You" absent 1981–1989. The "Lost Sailor>Saint of Circumstance" pairing lasted until 1986, after which the first song was dropped. "Alabama Getaway" figured in the band's steady repertoire from 1979 to 1989 and was briefly revived in 1995. "Althea" and "Feel Like a Stranger" were permanent prominent features in Dead concerts from 1979 until the end.

Go to Heaven was released on CD in 1987. In 2004 it was expanded and remastered for the Beyond Description box set on Rhino Records. This version was released individually on April 11, 2006. One of the bonus tracks, a studio outtake "Peggy-O", appeared as a bonus on Terrapin Station, in a less complete version. Ultimately, a version of the song was not released until Dick's Picks Volume 15, in 1999.

== Reception ==
Professional ratings
Review scores
Source	Rating
AllMusic	3/5 stars
Robert Christgau	C

When it was released, Go to Heaven generally received average to negative responses from critics. Though it was something of a return to the band's roots and had "more-punchy rock sounds", it was still a mainstream attempt and was seen as "mushy" in many reviews. Mydland's vocals resembled Michael McDonald to some critics who compared his California soft rock influence to the direction taken by the Doobie Brothers. However reviewers of Billboard expressed an opinion that this disc should "attract new fans as well as solidify the band's already huge following".

However, the criticism has softened and Go to Heaven is now regarded as an important album in the band's catalog. As noted by a retrospective review in AllMusic, "Time has somewhat mellowed the general disdain that critics and Deadheads alike leveled at Go to Heaven". The review also notes that a number of the songs developed into strong live numbers and praises the addition of Mydland to the band's lineup. J. M. DeMatteis's review in Rolling Stone summarized the album as "more of the same uninspired fluff that's become the Grateful Dead's recorded stock in trade", though he also acclaimed Mydland's contributions. DeMatteis, who is better known for his comic book work, came to regret his review of the album, ending his career as a music critic as a consequence. In contrast, Robert Christgau, while complimentary of the rendition of "Don't Ease Me In", considered Mydland an "utter wimp". In 2015, Classic Rock Review wrote, "While this may be a far cry from the group's lauded stage improvisation, it made for an enjoyable studio album which holds up decades later.... It still sounds good today and shows that this band had some vast talent away from the stage."

"Althea" became a concert staple and was ranked as the fifth best Grateful Dead song of all time by Stereogum, which said that the studio version "captures the band at its swampiest." Stereogum also considered Go to Heaven to be underrated.

Bassist Phil Lesh said "The cover, featuring us in Saturday Night Fever disco suits against a white background, reinforced the impression that we were 'going commercial'. Regardless of the reaction from hardcore Deadheads, Go to Heaven sold fairly well after its release in April 1980, making number twenty-three on the charts and recouping its studio costs. The critics ravaged it, however; the least offensive description I saw was 'cotton candy'. Personally, I thought that the music was a lot better than the album cover – the Garcia-Hunter and Weir-Barlow songs were major additions to our repertoire, and Brent's two songs, in spite of having been written before joining the band, gave notice that a new voice had arrived." Lesh also stated his preference for releasing live albums, explaining "[It was] our last studio album for seven years, as our disenchantment with studios, producers, and record company executives was complete; and besides, we had fulfilled the current Arista contract requirements with three studio albums in three years."

Kreutzmann likewise stated "If you go back and (re)listen to it, you'll find that time has been very kind to Go to Heaven. It plays better now than it did back then. That's still no excuse for the cover, though – all six of us, dressed all in white disco suits against a white background."

== Track listing ==
Side one
No.	Title	Writer(s)	Lead singer	Length
1.	"Alabama Getaway"	Jerry Garcia; Robert Hunter	Garcia	3:36
2.	"Far from Me"	Brent Mydland	Mydland	3:40
3.	"Althea"	Garcia; Hunter	Garcia	6:51
4.	"Feel Like a Stranger"	Bob Weir; John Perry Barlow	Weir	5:07

Side two
No.	Title	Writer(s)	Lead singer	Length
1.	"Lost Sailor"	Weir; Barlow	Weir	5:54
2.	"Saint of Circumstance"	Weir; Barlow	Weir	5:40
3.	"Antwerp's Placebo (The Plumber)"	Mickey Hart; Bill Kreutzmann	instrumental	0:38
4.	"Easy to Love You"	Mydland; Barlow	Mydland	3:40
5.	"Don't Ease Me In"	Traditional, arr. Grateful Dead	Garcia	3:13
Total length:				38:19

Bonus tracks on 2004/2006 reissue
No.	Title	Writer(s)	Lead vocals	Length
10.	"Peggy-O" (outtake, recorded July 16, 1979)	Traditional, arr. Grateful Dead	Garcia	5:51
11.	"What'll You Raise" (outtake, recorded July 16, 1979)	Garcia; Hunter	Garcia	4:10
12.	"Jack-A-Roe" (outtake, recorded July 14, 1979)	Traditional, arr. Grateful Dead	Garcia	4:55
13.	"Althea" (live at Radio City Music Hall, New York City, October 23, 1980)	Garcia; Hunter	Garcia	8:17
14.	"Lost Sailor" (live at Radio City, October 25, 1980)	Weir; Barlow	Weir	6:41
15.	"Saint of Circumstance" (live at Radio City, October 25, 1980)	Weir; Barlow	Weir	6:35

Notes:

- Additional recordings from October 23, 1980, appear on Reckoning.
- Additional recordings from October 25, 1980, appear on Reckoning and Dead Set.

== Personnel ==
Grateful Dead

- Jerry Garcia – guitar, vocals
- Mickey Hart – drums
- Bill Kreutzmann – drums
- Phil Lesh – bass guitar
- Brent Mydland – keyboards, vocals
- Bob Weir – guitar, vocals

Technical

- Betty Cantor-Jackson – engineering
- John Cutler – additional engineering
- Bob Matthews – additional engineering
- Peter Thea – additional engineering

Reissue personnel

- James Austin – production
- Hugh Brown – art coordination
- Andrew Clarke – liner notes
- Reggie Collins – annotations
- Jimmy Edwards – associate production
- Sheryl Farber – editorial supervision
- Tom Flye – additional mixing
- Joe Gastwirt – mastering, production consultancy
- Robert Gatley – mixing assistance
- Herb Greene – photography
- Robin Hurley – associate production
- Eileen Law – research
- David Lemieux – production
- Hale Milgrim – associate production
- Scott Pascucci – associate production
- Cameron Sears – executive production
- Bob Seidemann – photography
- Steve Vance – design

== Charts ==
=== Weekly charts ===
Year	Chart	Position
1980	Billboard Pop Albums	23

=== Singles ===
Year	Single	Chart	Position
1980	"Alabama Getaway"	Billboard Singles	68
