= Alabama Getaway =

- 2021 single sleeve

Single by Grateful Dead

from the album Go to Heaven
- B-side: "Far from Me"
- Released: April 28, 1980
- Length: 3:36
- Label: Arista
- Composer: Jerry Garcia
- Lyricist: Robert Hunter
- Producer: Gary Lyons

Grateful Dead singles chronology
"Shakedown Street" (1979)	"Alabama Getaway" (1980)	"Don't Ease Me In" (1980)

Official audio
- "Alabama Getaway" on YouTube

"Alabama Getaway" is a song by the American rock band Grateful Dead, released as the first of two singles from their 1980 album Go to Heaven.

== Background ==
"Alabama Getaway" was written by Jerry Garcia (music) and Robert Hunter (lyrics) and has narrative ambiguities. It is specifically an "outlaw tale with lots of Old West imagery," "Alabama Getaway" was often mistakenly assumed to be about the then recent departure of Keith and Donna Jean Godchaux.

== Music and lyrics ==
"Alabama Getaway" is a Berry-esque rock track, and features a Minimoog solo performed by Brent Mydland. the music of which has been described by Lindsay Planer as a "greasy four-on-the floor rocker [that is] connected by a blues-derived saga of a Sugar Daddy-type character". The song was a staple of the band's concert setlists of the early 1980s.

== Critical reception ==
Writing for Rolling Stone, J.M. De Matteis believes that it "does its job with an admirable brevity that might have saved a few of the album’s terminally long-winded compositions". American music magazine Cashbox opined the band "take the blues/rock boogie road to the south and its smooth sailing all the way" on the track. Record World writes that "Garcia's lead vocals and guitar work are on the money and new keyboard/vocalist, Brent Mydland shows he has the boogie in his blood."

== Credits and personnel ==
According to the Grateful Dead Family Discography:

Performers

- Jerry Garcia - guitar, vocals
- Brent Mydland - keyboards, vocals
- Bill Kreutzmann - drums
- Bob Weir - guitar, vocals
- Phil Lesh - bass
- Mickey Hart - drums

Production

- Producer - Gary Lyons
- Engineer - Gary Lyons, Betty Cantor-Jackson
- Additional engineer - Peter Thea, Bob Matthews, John Cutler
- Recorded at Club Front, San Rafael

== Charts ==
Weekly chart performance for "Alabama Getaway"
Chart (1980)	Peak position
US Billboard Hot 100	68
US Cashbox Top 100 Singles	79
US Record World Singles Chart	68
