= Foolish Heart (Grateful Dead song) =

Single by Grateful Dead

from the album Built to Last
- B-side: "We Can Run"
- Released: November 1989
- Length: 5:10
- Label: Arista
- Composer: Jerry Garcia
- Lyricist: Robert Hunter
- Producers: John Cutler; Garcia

Grateful Dead singles chronology
"Throwing Stones" (1987)	"Foolish Heart" (1989)

Music video
- "Foolish Heart" on YouTube

"Foolish Heart" is a song with music by Jerry Garcia and lyrics by Robert Hunter for the American rock band Grateful Dead, released as the lead and only single from the band's final album Built to Last in 1989. It was also the final single the band released before their breakup.

== Background and composition ==
Jerry Garcia said about the track that it is "a sort of asymmetrical melody that's very natural sounding". He also said about the song that "Nobody’s playing chords in the song, not anybody. Everybody’s playing lines, and the lines hook up and tell you everything you need to know about the harmonic content of the song. You don’t wonder where it’s going. It’s so beautifully designed, it’s like a clock. It’s really lovely. It surprised me it came out so interesting and so perfect and so totally its own personality. That’s the Grateful Dead in action, really." The song's lyrics themselves, like many of Robert Hunter's lyrics, gives advice to someone in a "cryptically playful manner", as Grateful Dead historian Oliver Trager put it in his book The American Book of the Dead.

== Release and reception ==
"Foolish Heart" was issued as the lead and only single from the album Built to Last in November 1989 by Arista Records. The cassette release of the single included five Grateful Dead themed playing cards. In a review of the song for AllMusic, Lindsay Planer states that "The LP version sticks fairly close to the arrangement that the band would adopt in performance", he notes that "This cut follows in much the same mould as the band’s highest charting single 'Touch Of Grey'", he concludes by writing that "Once the Dead were able to take it to the stage, 'Foolish Heart' began to stretch out. By early 1990 it had evolved into one of the portals that could transport the band and the listener in practically any direction." Writing for American Songwriter, Jim Beviglia notes it "is a piece of work that’s good enough to stand toe-to-toe even with the band’s finest", he comments that "is a marvelous combination of the band’s inimitable instrumental chemistry and lyricist Robert Hunter’s profound ponderings. Throw in a great performance by Jerry Garcia and you’ve got a true gem in the Dead’s imposing catalog", concluding in his review that the track is "worth the listen as a shining example of late-period Grateful Dead that sounds like the band in its prime." The song never charted on the Billboard Hot 100, yet managed to chart in Canada at position 72, and on BIllboard's Mainstream Rock tracks chart at number 8.

== Personnel ==
According to the Grateful Dead Family Discography:

Musicians

- Jerry Garcia – guitar, vocals, producer
- Mickey Hart – drums
- Bill Kreutzmann – drums
- Phil Lesh – bass
- Brent Mydland – keyboards, vocals
- Bob Weir – guitar, vocals

Production

- John Cutler – producer, engineer
- Bob Bralove – associate producer/programmer
- Tom Flye – engineer
- Jeff Sterling – engineer
- David Roberts – engineer
- Peter Miller – engineer
- Justin Kreutzmann – engineer
- Chris Wiskes – engineer
- Joe Gastwirt – digital mastering

== Charts ==
Chart performance for "Foolish Heart"
Chart (1989)	Position
Canada Top Singles (RPM)	72
US Mainstream Rock (Billboard)	8
