= Touch of Grey =

1987 single by the Grateful Dead

Single by Grateful Dead

from the album In the Dark
- B-side: "My Brother Esau"
- Released: June 16, 1987
- Recorded: January 1987
- Genre: Pop rock
- Length: 5:50 (album version); 4:35 (single version)
- Label: Arista
- Songwriters: Jerry Garcia; Robert Hunter
- Producer: John Cutler

Grateful Dead singles chronology
"Dire Wolf" (1981)	"Touch of Grey" (1987)	"When Push Comes to Shove" (1987)

"Touch of Grey" is a 1987 single by the Grateful Dead, and is from the album In the Dark. The music was composed by Jerry Garcia, and the lyrics were written by Robert Hunter. The song was released as the first single from In the Dark and became the band's only top 10 hit on Billboard Hot 100. Peaking at No. 9, it also reached No. 1 on the Mainstream Rock Tracks chart.

== Background ==
"Touch of Grey" was first performed as an encore on September 15, 1982, at the Capital Centre in Landover, Maryland, and was finally released on In the Dark in 1987. It was released as a single with "My Brother Esau" and later "Throwing Stones", and has appeared on a number of albums and collections.

The song's refrain features the lines "I will get by / I will survive" and combines dark lyrics in the verses with upbeat pop instrumentation. The final chorus changes the pronoun to "We will get by / We will survive".

== Release ==
For the week dated June 26, 1987, "Touch of Grey" received 145 adds to album oriented rock stations that report to Radio & Records, making it the most added song in that format for that week. The publication also mentioned that 84 percent of reporting album oriented rock stations had the song in their rotation. That same week, The Hard Report called it "the most raved about new record we've encountered this year." When discussing how the song had been received by listeners, Doug Clifton from KBCO said that "we haven't seen this much response to a new release since The Joshua Tree."

"Touch of Grey" entered the Billboard Hot 100 at number 77 for the week dated July 25, 1987; in the process, it became their first song to appear on the Hot 100 in seven years and was the second most added song on radio that week. For the week dated August 15, 1987, it ascended 15 places to number 32, becoming the band's first song to reach the top 40. This occurred seventeen years after their first entry on the Hot 100, "Uncle John's Band", which at the time marked the longest span of time between a band's debut on the Hot 100 and their first entry into the top 40. "Touch of Grey" peaked at number 9, and reached number 1 on the Mainstream Rock Tracks chart.

== Music video ==
The music video for "Touch of Grey" gained major airplay on MTV and featured a live performance of the band, first shown to be life-size skeleton marionettes dressed as the band, then as themselves. Audience members from the band's May 7, 1987 performance in Monterey, California are also featured in the music video. The skeleton of bassist Phil Lesh catches a rose in its teeth, thrown by a female attendee; later, a dog steals the lower leg of percussionist Mickey Hart, and a stagehand hurries to retrieve and reattach it. Near the end of the video, the camera tilts up into the rafters to reveal that the living band members are themselves marionettes being operated by a pair of skeletal hands.

The video was directed by Gary Gutierrez, who had previously created the animation sequences for The Grateful Dead Movie. It was filmed at Laguna Seca Raceway after one of the band's concerts in May 1987. The video for "Touch of Grey" was launched on MTV in June 1987. Commenting on the appeal of the music video, that he was "a little skeptical about the Dead on MTV", but that "they've found a perfect medium between a performance and concept video".

The popularity of the single and its video helped introduce the Grateful Dead to a new group of fans, resulting in the band gaining additional mainstream attention and activating sales for their back catalog. During the song's climb up the charts in early September, the Grateful Dead's first two studio albums on Arista, specifically Terrapin Station and Shakedown Street, received Gold certifications from the Recording Industry Association of America.

== Video documentary ==
The Grateful Dead also released a 30-minute documentary called Dead Ringers: The Making of Touch of Grey, about the production of the music video. The documentary was directed by Justin Kreutzmann, the son of drummer Bill Kreutzmann.

== Personnel ==
- Jerry Garcia – lead vocals, lead guitar
- Bob Weir – rhythm guitar, backing vocals
- Phil Lesh – bass guitar
- Brent Mydland – organ, synthesizer, backing vocals
- Bill Kreutzmann – drums and percussion
- Mickey Hart – drums and percussion

== Chart performance ==
Weekly chart performance for "Touch of Grey"
Chart (1987)	Position
Canada Top Singles (RPM)	17
US Billboard Hot 100	9
US Adult Contemporary (Billboard)	15
US Mainstream Rock (Billboard)	1

== Legacy ==
The song "Harmony Hall" by Vampire Weekend has been compared to "Touch of Grey".
