= Estimated Prophet =

Song by Grateful Dead

from the album Terrapin Station
- Released: July 27, 1977
- Genre: Reggae rock
- Length: 5:35
- Label: Arista
- Songwriters: Bob Weir; John Perry Barlow
- Producer: Keith Olsen

"Estimated Prophet" is a song by American rock band the Grateful Dead. It was released as the first track on their ninth studio album Terrapin Station (1977). The song was composed and sung by rhythm guitarist Bob Weir with lyrics by John Perry Barlow. The reggae-influenced song is played in an odd time signature and features lyrics depicting a fervent narrator inspired by particularly fanatical followers of the band.

First played live in 1977, "Estimated Prophet" remained a staple of the band's setlists throughout its existence. It has received positive reviews from critics, being considered a highlight of its parent album and one of Weir's (and the band's) best songs. It has appeared on numerous live and compilation albums, and was played by post-Grateful Dead bands such as the Other Ones, Furthur, and Dead & Company.

== Overview ==
"Estimated Prophet" is often cited as being in 7/8 time, i.e. having seven eighth-notes per bar, though drummer Bill Kreutzmann states it is "technically" in 14/8. Oliver Trager describes the song as "jangly psychedelic reggae", while Lindsay Planer of AllMusic characterizes it as "rhythmically buoyant" reggae-influenced rock.

Its lyrics constitute a "tongue-in-cheek swipe at the band's most fanatical, and sometimes threatening, followers", with Variety writer A.D. Amorosi considering the narrator to be "an unwise, but still charismatic, spiritual guru of unnamed origin." Weir noted that the genesis of the song came when its opening line, "My time comin' any day now" (Note: The finalized lyric does not contain the word "now") "just sort of occurred" to him, along with its melody line. He also cited it as an example of a song grown out of a spontaneous moment when noting that its composition was an amalgamation of several different "shards" in 7/8, which he "tied together" into a complete song.

It was first performed on February 26, 1977, at the Swing Auditorium in San Bernardino, California. The song would remain in setlists for the remainder of the band's existence, being played 390 times. On March 29, 1990, the band performed the song with guest Branford Marsalis on saxophone.

== Reception ==
"Estimated Prophet" has received praise from critics, being frequently ranked as one of the band's best songs. Matt Mitchell of Paste included it at number six on the magazine's list of the 20 best Grateful Dead songs, declaring it to be "one of the best opening tracks in rock history", highlighting Donna Jean Godchaux's harmony vocals as "euphoric" and describing the saxophone and lyricon performances by Tom Scott as "jaw-dropping". Rolling Stone ranked the song as the band's 16th best, noting its stature as a "quick hit with Deadheads" and "a sort of accidental anthem for the song's promised land — the band's home state of California."

Upon Weir's death in 2026, many publications included "Estimated Prophet" in lists of his best compositions. Both Rolling Stone and the New York Times chose it as one of Weir's "essential" songs, with both publications highlighting the rendition performed on May 8, 1977 at Cornell University. The song was included on similar lists by BrooklynVegan, Mojo, Variety, and The Guardian.
