= Shakedown Street =

Studio album by Grateful Dead
- Released: November 8, 1978
- Recorded: July 31–August 18, 1978
- Studios: Club Le Front, except "Serengetti", Meta Tantay, Carlin, Nevada
- Genres: Pop rock; roots rock; blues rock; disco; funk rock
- Length: 39:04
- Label: Arista
- Producer: Lowell George

Grateful Dead chronology
What a Long Strange Trip It's Been (1977)	Shakedown Street (1978)	Go to Heaven (1980)

Singles from Shakedown Street
- 1. "Good Lovin'" Released: November 15, 1978; 2. "Shakedown Street" Released: April 1979

Professional ratings
Review scores
Source	Rating
AllMusic	2/5 stars
Christgau's Record Guide	C
Rolling Stone	Mixed

Shakedown Street is the tenth studio album (fifteenth overall) by rock band the Grateful Dead, released November 8, 1978, by Arista Records. The album came just over a year after previous studio album Terrapin Station. It was the final album for Keith and Donna Jean Godchaux, who left the band a few months after its release. The record was produced by Lowell George (of Little Feat) and John Kahn.

== Recording ==
Toward the end of the Grateful Dead's 1974–1976 hiatus, they rented a Front Street warehouse in San Rafael. In 1977, when lead guitarist Jerry Garcia was rehearsing with the Jerry Garcia Band for the recording of Cats Under the Stars, they decided to capture the sound of the room, installing studio recording equipment. The rehearsal/storage space was then convenient for recording Shakedown Street, as lobbied for by Garcia. The Dead again worked with an outside producer, but this time they sought a fellow and respected musician. Drummer Bill Kreutzmann said "We didn't want to work with Keith Olsen again, but we had to keep our promise to Clive Davis and have someone in the producer's chair – so we hired Little Feat's Lowell George."

Drummer-percussionist Mickey Hart exerted greater influence than previously, earning three co-compositional credits in addition to assisting with the arrangements of several songs, including Garcia/Hunter's title track (influenced by his interest in the Bee Gees and disco). As with the previous album's "Terrapin Flyer", Hart and Kreutzmann wrote a percussion-based instrumental track ("Serengetti"), recording it at the compound of Rolling Thunder, in Nevada. Hart's reggae-informed "Fire on the Mountain", with lyrics by Garcia's writing partner Robert Hunter, evolved from "Happiness Is Drumming", which appeared on his Diga Rhythm Band's 1976 album. Although an attempt to record the song for Terrapin Station proved to be unsuccessful, it rapidly evolved into one of the band's principal jamming vehicles (often paired with Garcia's "Scarlet Begonias") during their spring 1977 tour. Hart and Hunter's "France" was sung by Donna Godchaux and rhythm guitarist Bob Weir, who devised the final arrangement and earned a compositional credit. Donna made her second, and final, singing-songwriting performance on a Dead studio album with "From the Heart of Me". (In between her two contributions, she also wrote and sang "Rain" on Cats Under the Stars.)

"Stagger Lee" is an original Garcia/Hunter composition based on the oft-covered folk song. The duo also contributed the torch song "If I Had the World to Give," an atypical work in their oeuvre. According to Hunter, "Jerry and I sat down and on a lark decided to write a romantic song, just for the heck of it. We were feeling sensitive because someone said 'Oh you write songs about guys for guys.' Something that would sound good in an old '50s cocktail lounge – that was the idea."

Contrasting with disco, California soft rock and ballads were the songs brought by Weir. Written with lyricist John Perry Barlow, "I Need a Miracle" is a rave-up rocker featuring his longtime friend and Kingfish bandmate Matthew Kelly on harmonica. Two Weir-sung covers – Noah Lewis's "All New Minglewood Blues" and the Young Rascals' "Good Lovin'" – originally dated from the first years of the band (the latter previously sung by Ron "Pigpen" McKernan) but were presented in more contemporary arrangements. George would take "Six Feet of Snow," a collaboration with Keith Godchaux, to his next Little Feat album, Down on the Farm.

With studio sessions uncompleted, the Grateful Dead made three concert appearances. To help pay for the opportunity to play three dates in front of the Great Sphinx of Giza and bring a large entourage to Egypt, they performed two concerts at Red Rocks and one at Giants Stadium. The shows gave them the opportunity to test five of the songs in front of audiences and work on the arrangements (see also Rocking the Cradle: Egypt 1978). Concerned with finishing the album in time for a US fall tour, the Dead then cancelled concerts scheduled for the UK that were to follow Egypt concurrent with returning borrowed equipment to the Who. With Lowell George no longer available, the album was finished with Jerry Garcia Band bassist John Kahn producing and taking over the organ seat for the troubled Godchaux. George died just months after the album's release.

== Release ==
The album cover art is by underground comix artist Gilbert Shelton. The front cover features the cartoonist's reimagining of the San Rafael warehouse district where the band had their practice and storage facility. Characters in the illustration resemble those from Shelton's The Fabulous Furry Freak Brothers. The back cover features the "Invisible Pimp", Shelton's character in a green zoot suit, twirling the fob of his watch chain and finger snapping. Sometimes called the "Doo-Dah Man" (after a lyric in "Truckin'"), it was originally drawn as a skeleton, but then rendered bodyless, except for smiling teeth and a pair of eyes. It became one of the many icons associated with the Grateful Dead, appearing in all manner of official and fan-produced art.

At the height of punk rock's California-centric second wave, the Grateful Dead were perceived by critics as having gone out of touch and abandoning their experimental edge by producing an album informed by disco and softer rock. Disco dominated the charts in the year following the massive success of Saturday Night Fever, but the dance-floor rhythms and production standards of the genre were seen as antithetical to traditional rock by many fans who viewed such changes in style as trend-following and mainstream-baiting. Fans were uneasy with what they sensed was a sell-out attempt, though ultimately the band's crucial live performances continued on their own organic trajectory as the new songs entered set list rotation. According to Kreutzmann, "Deadheads refer to this album, and even this era, as Disco Dead. I can see why. ... Given the material and the producer, Shakedown Street just wasn’t as good as it should have been." However, Hart has been forthright about the collusion between band and label to make a commercial-sounding album: "We were trying to sell out – 'Oh, let's make a single and get on the radio'. Sure. We failed miserably once again. I mean, we could never sell out even if we tried, and we tried". Although it ultimately attained a RIAA gold certification in 1987, the album was the band's first studio effort since Aoxomoxoa to fail to enter the Billboard Top 40, only peaking at #41 during a nineteen-week chart stay.

"Lowell played good guitar, but he was no producer – certainly not for the Grateful Dead"

— Mickey Hart

Comparatively few of the album's songs can technically be considered disco – chiefly the title track, which features the four-on-the-floor beat, chicken-scratch guitar, syncopated bass and off-beat, lift-and-close hi-hat that were hallmarks of the genre. Other songs have the Latin syncopation and production sheen associated with the style, but rely on rock arrangements and guitar-based instrumentation, lacking the synthesizers and horn sections favored by disco. The larger stylistic change from the previous studio album was the move toward polyrhythmic backing and steelpan and cross-beat drumming, centered on Hart, and the increase in soft rock or ballad tracks. Donna Godchaux called the light and bouncy tone of the album "almost tongue-in-cheek".

The week of the album's release, the Grateful Dead appeared on Saturday Night Live at the behest of Al Franken and Tom Davis. Their first of two appearances on the show, it was also their first time on a major network broadcast. They performed twice, playing "Casey Jones" and "I Need a Miracle>Good Lovin'" (the former was released on SNL25, The Musical Performances, Volume 1).

Two singles were released from the album. "Good Lovin'" (b/w "Stagger Lee") is an edited version, with one verse excised and an early fade-out. It was followed by "Shakedown Street" (b/w "France"), in an edited version that excises a verse, a chorus, and a guitar solo.

The new arrangement of "New Minglewood Blues" had been in live rotation for two years and that of "Good Lovin'" for more than one year. Both remained in the group's rotation for the duration of their career, along with "Shakedown Street", "I Need a Miracle", "Stagger Lee" and "Fire on the Mountain". After just three performances, "If I Had the World to Give" was dropped by the end of 1978 due to its challenging vocal range. "From the Heart of Me" was performed for the rest of Godchaux's tenure. "France" and "Serengetti" were never performed live.

By the late 1980s, the name "Shakedown Street" was co-opted by Deadheads as an ironic name for the midway-like area for vending, performance and socializing that would appear in parking lots and locales adjacent to concert venues, set up by those following Grateful Dead concert tours.

Shakedown Street was released on CD in 1987. It was remastered and expanded for the Beyond Description box set in October 2004. This version was separately released March 7, 2006, by Rhino Records.

== Track listing ==
Side one
No.	Title	Writer(s)	Lead singer(s)	Length
1.	"Good Lovin'"	Rudy Clark; Arthur Resnick	Bob Weir	4:51
2.	"France"	Mickey Hart; Weir; Robert Hunter	Bob Weir; Donna Godchaux	4:03
3.	"Shakedown Street"	Jerry Garcia; Hunter	Garcia	4:59
4.	"Serengetti"	Hart; Bill Kreutzmann	instrumental	1:59
5.	"Fire on the Mountain"	Hart; Hunter	Garcia	3:46

Side two
No.	Title	Writer(s)	Lead singer(s)	Length
1.	"I Need a Miracle"	Bob Weir; John Perry Barlow	Bob Weir	3:36
2.	"From the Heart of Me"	D. Godchaux	D. Godchaux	3:23
3.	"Stagger Lee"	Garcia; Hunter	Garcia	3:25
4.	"All New Minglewood Blues"	Noah Lewis	Weir	4:12
5.	"If I Had the World to Give"	Garcia; Hunter	Garcia	4:50

Bonus tracks on 2004/2006 reissue
No.	Title	Writer(s)	Lead singer(s)	Length
11.	"Good Lovin'" (outtake)	Clark; Resnick	Lowell George	4:56
12.	"Ollin Arageed" (live in Giza, Egypt, September 16, 1978 (Note: Edited performance by Hamza El Din, both solo and backed by the Grateful Dead. A different edit of the track appears on Rocking the Cradle, with more from this date))	Hamza El Din		6:30
13.	"Fire on the Mountain" (live in Giza, Egypt, September 16, 1978 (Note: Also appears on Rocking the Cradle, with more from this date))	Hart; Hunter		13:43
14.	"Stagger Lee" (live in Giza, Egypt, September 15, 1978)	Garcia; Hunter		6:39
15.	"All New Minglewood Blues" (live at Capitol Theatre, Passaic, New Jersey, November 24, 1978 (Note: Another track from this date appears on the DVD accompanying "Grateful Dead Scrapbook (Deluxe)" by Ben Fong-Torres (Chronicle Books; 2009)))	Lewis		4:34

== Personnel ==
Grateful Dead

- Jerry Garcia – lead guitar, vocals
- Donna Jean Godchaux – vocals
- Keith Godchaux – keyboards, vocals
- Mickey Hart – drums, percussion
- Bill Kreutzmann – drums, percussion
- Phil Lesh – bass guitar
- Bob Weir – guitar, vocals

Additional musicians

- Jordan Amarantha – percussion
- Lowell George – production, lead vocal on the studio outtake of "Good Lovin'"
- Matthew Kelly – harmonica
- Steve Schuster – horn on "From the Heart of Me"

Technical personnel

- Brett Cohen – engineering
- George Horn – mastering at The Automatt, San Francisco
- Ted Jensen – mastering at Sterling Sound, NYC
- John Kahn – horn arrangements, production (uncredited)
- Bob Matthews – engineering

Reissue personnel

- James Austin – production
- Jeffrey Boden – mixing assistance
- Hugh Brown – art coordination
- Billy Candelario – mixing assistance
- Reggie Collins – liner notes
- Jimmy Edwards – associate production
- Sheryl Farber – editorial supervision
- Tom Flye – mixing
- Joe Gastwirt – mastering, production consultancy
- Robert Gatley – mixing assistance
- John Hagen – mixing assistance
- Robin Hurley – associate production
- John Kahn – associate production
- Eileen Law – research
- David Lemieux – production
- Hale Milgrim – associate production
- Robert Minkin – photography
- Steve Parish – mixing assistance
- Scott Pascucci – associate production
- Ed Perlstein – photography
- Bruce Polonsky – photography
- Ron Rakow – photography
- Rip Rense – liner notes
- Steven Schuster – horn
- Cameron Sears – executive production
- Gilbert Shelton – art coordination
- Steve Vance – art coordination

== Charts ==
Year	Chart	Position
1979	Billboard Pop Albums	41

RIAA Certification

Certification	Date
Gold	September 4, 1987
