= Shakedown Street (song) =

- cover art for 2020 reissue

Single by Grateful Dead

from the album Shakedown Street
- B-side: "France"
- Released: November 15, 1978
- Recorded: 1978
- Genre: Funk rock, disco
- Length: 4:59
- Label: Arista
- Songwriters: Jerry Garcia, Robert Hunter
- Producer: Lowell George

Grateful Dead singles chronology
"Good Lovin'" (1978)	"Shakedown Street" (1978)	"Alabama Getaway" (1980)

"Shakedown Street" is a song by the Grateful Dead. It was written by lyricist Robert Hunter and composed by guitarist Jerry Garcia. It was released as the title track on the album Shakedown Street in November 1978. The song was first performed live on August 31, 1978, at the Red Rocks Amphitheatre, in Morrison, Colorado. The song "From the Heart of Me" was also played for the first time during the performance. The album Shakedown Street reached number 41 on the Billboard Top 200 for 1979.

The term "Shakedown Street" was later used colloquially to describe the area outside of Grateful Dead concerts where vendors sold their wares.

== Production ==
"Shakedown Street" was produced by Lowell George. The song was recorded and mixed at the band's studio, Club Le Front, in San Rafael, California. The recording took place throughout July 31, 1978 and August 18, 1978. "Shakedown Street" is found on the band's original album Shakedown Street (1978) as well as single recordings on Shakedown Street/France (1979), and Alabama Getaway/Shakedown Street (1981).

Musicians include:

- Jerry Garcia - guitar, vocals
- Donna Godchaux - vocals
- Keith Godchaux - keyboard
- Mickey Hart - drums, percussion
- Robert Hunter - lyrics
- Bill Kreutzmann - drums, percussion
- Phil Lesh - bass, vocals
- Bob Weir - guitar, vocals

== Shakedown Street vending ==
After the song's success, many Grateful Dead followers, or Deadheads, used the name for the vending areas outside of Grateful Dead concerts during the 1980s and 90s. These areas were a place to purchase merchandise, food, and often illicit items.

In more recent years, the music and arts festival Bonnaroo has used the term to describe the concert's long strip of vending.
