= Throwing Stones =

Single by Grateful Dead

from the album In the Dark
- B-side: "When Push Comes To Shove"
- Released: November 1987
- Genre: Rock
- Length: 7:21
- Label: Arista
- Songwriters: Bob Weir; John Perry Barlow
- Producers: Jerry Garcia; John Cutler

Grateful Dead singles chronology
"Touch of Grey" (1987)	"Throwing Stones" (1987)	"Foolish Heart" (1989)

"Throwing Stones" is a song by the Grateful Dead. It appears on their 1987 album In the Dark. It was also released as a single, with a B-side of "When Push Comes to Shove".

== Overview ==
"Throwing Stones" is a political song, being described by Jim Allen of CultureSonar as "lyrically dense" and "analyz[ing] the American sociopolitical scene of the day". Allen notes that the lyrics "take both the establishment and the anti-authoritarians to task", while lamenting the state of the world being left for the next generation". David Dodd, writing for the band's official website, theorizes that the song's title is a biblical reference, or possibly is inspired by the phrase "people who live in glass houses should not throw stones".

The first live performance of "Throwing Stones" was on September 17, 1982, at the Cumberland County Civic Center in Portland, Maine. In the band's sets, the song frequently emerged from slower ballads sung by Jerry Garcia, and in many cases segued directly into "Not Fade Away". In later years, performances of the song by Dead & Company were accompanied by expressions of political and social concerns, such as the 2018 Parkland high school shooting and the overturning of Roe v. Wade in 2022.

== Reception ==
"Throwing Stones" has received positive reviews from critics. CultureSonar stated the song contains "some of [Barlow's] best lines" and noting it "never lack[s] momentum" despite its lyrical density. Jim Harrington of the East Bay Times praises the track as "one of the standout tracks" from In the Dark, calling it "a powerful rocker addressing social concerns" and a "definite nominee for the best song the Dead created during the later part of its career".
