= Fire on the Mountain (Grateful Dead song) =

Song by the Grateful Dead

from the album Shakedown Street
- Released: November 15, 1978
- Recorded: 1978
- Genre: Rock
- Length: 3:46
- Label: Arista
- Composer: Mickey Hart
- Lyricist: Robert Hunter
- Producer: Lowell George

"Fire on the Mountain" is a song by the Grateful Dead. The lyrics were written by Robert Hunter and the music by drummer Mickey Hart. It was commercially released on the album Shakedown Street in November 1978. An earlier instrumental version titled "Happiness is Drumming" appeared in 1976 on Mickey Hart's album Diga with the Diga Rhythm Band. According to Dead lyricist Robert Hunter in his book A Box of Rain: Lyrics 1965–1993, his lyrics for the song come from an actual fire that was destroying houses near Hart's home in Northern California.

Prior to the Dead recording, the song premiered at a concert on March 18, 1977, in San Francisco. That night, as almost always, it was coupled with "Scarlet Begonias" during live performances, producing lengthy musical improvisations. The paired songs were soon nicknamed "Scarlet Fire". The sequence typically timed from 20 to 25 minutes. The November 1, 1979, performance at Nassau Coliseum, Uniondale, New York, likely the longest, clocks in over 34 minutes.

"Fire on the Mountain" was performed in concert by the Grateful Dead 253 times between 1977 and 1995. It appears on numerous Grateful Dead albums. An outtake of the song appeared as a bonus track on the 2004 reissue of Terrapin Station.

This song is also featured as downloadable content for the video game Rock Band.

The song was a favorite of NBA basketball player and notable deadhead Bill Walton. The song was used during numerous tributes in his honor following his death in May 2024.

== Critical reception ==
In a review for AllMusic, Lindsay Planer writes that "After the Dead introduced ["Fire on the Mountain"] into their live sets in March 1977, it became a permanent concert fixture for nearly two decades. From the very first performance, it remained the latter half of a medley, linking it to "Scarlet Begonias"—a cut that had been in the band's repertoire for over three years. So successful was the combo that neither would be played very often in any other configurations." concluding in his review by opining that "As the studio recording doesn’t come close to revealing its dynamic potential, enthusiasts are encouraged to locate any of the multitude of concert releases"

== Other versions ==
- Leftover Salmon parodied the song with a version called "Pasta On the Mountain", which appeared on their 1993 release Bridges to Bert.
- In a 2000 show at Solebury High School in New Hope, Pennsylvania, the band Ween played the song live.
- In 2008, Keller Williams released a bluegrass version of the song on the album Rex (Live at the Fillmore).
- Daniel Donato recorded the song on his 2020 album A Young Man's Country
- Mt. Joy played the song at the Capitol Theatre on April 11, 2022.

== See also ==
- Dark Star
