= Hell in a Bucket =

- US vinyl promo sleeve

Promotional single by Grateful Dead

from the album In the Dark
- B-side: "West L.A. Fadeaway"
- Released: July 6, 1987
- Length: 5:35
- Label: Arista
- Songwriters: Bob Weir; Brent Mydland; John Perry Barlow
- Producers: Jerry Garcia; John Cutler

Music video
- "Hell in a Bucket" on YouTube

"Hell in a Bucket" is a song by the American rock band Grateful Dead from their twelfth studio album In the Dark (1987).

== Background ==
"Hell in a Bucket" was written by Bob Weir and John Perry Barlow, in a up-tempo waltz style, with the first performance of the song on May 13, 1983. The lyrics contain allusions to "biker-chicks", while also having lyrics about "playfully toys with the risqué", as author Oliver Trager put about the lyrics.

== Release and reception ==
"Hell in a Bucket" was released as the second track on the band's twelfth studio album In the Dark, It was also issued as a promotional single with "West L.A. Fadeaway" as its flipside. In a review for In the Dark on AllMusic, Dave Connolly called it "cheerfully cranky". The band filmed and released a music video, which begins in a bar with bikers greeting each other, with Jerry Garcia at the bar isolating himself from everyone else strumming Tiger, a guitar custom made for Garcia, before panning over to Bob Weir wearing a lavender blazer with a duck wearing a leather collar with him. A fight breaks out and a wooden chair gets hit over Weir's head before the camera cuts to Weir in a bedroom with a dominatrix, then Mickey Hart and Bill Kreutzmann, dressed as devils, take a joyride at nighttime with Weir in the back of the car. Back in the bedroom, Weir is joined by the duck from earlier, alongside many other farm animals, Brent Mydland and Phil Lesh (with Lesh dressed as a ringmaster). The Guardian writer Stevie Chick included it in an unnumbered list of Weir's 10 best songs. writing that "this cynical kiss-off to a former lover proved the Dead hadn't sacrificed their dark wit for stardom", noting that "It's a timeless sentiment, even if the gonzo music video featuring Weir in a pastel suit straight out of Miami Vice, and his leather-clad ex, has not aged so well – though Bob is clearly having fun throughout."

== Personnel ==
According to the Grateful Dead Family Discography:

- Bob Weir – guitar, vocals
- Jerry Garcia – guitar, vocals
- Mickey Hart – drums
- Bill Kreutzmann – drums
- Phil Lesh – bass
- Brent Mydland – keyboards, vocals
