= Listen to the River: St. Louis '71 '72 '73 =

Live album and box set by Grateful Dead
- Released: October 8, 2021
- Recorded: December 9 – 10, 1971; October 17 – 19, 1972; October 29 – 30, 1973
- Venues: Fox Theatre; Kiel Auditorium
- Genre: Rock
- Label: Rhino
- Producer: Grateful Dead

Grateful Dead chronology
Fox Theatre, St. Louis, MO 12-10-71 (2021)	Listen to the River: St. Louis '71 '72 '73 (2021)	Dave's Picks Volume 40 (2021)

Grateful Dead concert box set chronology
June 1976 (2020)	Listen to the River: St. Louis '71 '72 '73 (2021)	Lyceum '72: The Complete Recordings (2022)

Listen to the River: St. Louis '71 '72 '73 is a live album by the rock band the Grateful Dead. Packaged as a box set, it contains seven complete concerts on 20 CDs. The concerts were performed in St. Louis, Missouri in December 1971, October 1972, and October 1973. The box set also includes an 84-page hardcover book. It was released on October 8, 2021, in a limited edition of 13,000 numbered copies.

The December 10, 1971 concert included in Listen to the River was also released on October 1, 2021 as a stand-alone three-CD album called Fox Theatre, St. Louis, MO 12-10-71. Additionally, part of the second set of the October 18, 1972 show was released on October 1 as a two-disc LP called Light into Ashes.

== Concerts ==
Listen to the River: St. Louis '71 '72 '73 contains recordings of these concerts, all of which were performed in St. Louis, Missouri:

- December 9, 1971 – Fox Theatre
- December 10, 1971 – Fox Theatre
- October 17, 1972 – Fox Theatre
- October 18, 1972 – Fox Theatre
- October 19, 1972 – Fox Theatre
- October 29, 1973 – Kiel Auditorium
- October 30, 1973 – Kiel Auditorium

== Track listing ==
=== December 9, 1971 – Fox Theatre ===
Disc 1

First set:

1. "Truckin'" (Jerry Garcia, Phil Lesh, Bob Weir, Robert Hunter) – 12:47
2. "Brown-Eyed Women" (Garcia, Hunter) – 4:53
3. "Mr. Charlie" (Ron McKernan, Hunter) – 4:13
4. "Jack Straw" (Weir, Hunter) – 5:20
5. "Sugaree" (Garcia, Hunter) – 7:52
6. "Beat It On Down the Line" (Jesse Fuller) – 3:54
7. "It Hurts Me Too" (Elmore James, Marshall Sehorn) – 6:25
8. "Tennessee Jed" (Garcia, Hunter) – 7:28
9. "El Paso" (Marty Robbins) – 5:13
10. "Run Rudolph Run" (Johnny Marks, Marvin Brodie) – 3:56
11. "Black Peter" (Garcia, Hunter) – 9:29
12. "Playing in the Band" (Weir, Mickey Hart, Hunter) – 6:37

Disc 2

1. "Casey Jones" (Garcia, Hunter) – 6:02
2. "One More Saturday Night" (Weir) – 4:39

Second set:

3. "Ramble On Rose" (Garcia, Hunter) – 8:05
4. "Mexicali Blues" (Weir, John Perry Barlow) – 3:33
5. "Big Boss Man" (Al Smith, Luther Dixon) – 5:39
6. "Sugar Magnolia" (Weir, Hunter) – 7:29
7. "Not Fade Away" (Norman Petty, Charles Hardin) – 4:47 →
8. "Goin' Down the Road Feeling Bad" (traditional, arranged by Grateful Dead) – 6:29 →
9. "Not Fade Away" (Petty, Hardin) – 3:59

=== December 10, 1971 – Fox Theatre ===
Disc 3

First set:

1. "Bertha" (Garcia, Hunter) – 6:32
2. "Me and My Uncle" (John Phillips) – 3:48
3. "Mr. Charlie" (McKernan, Hunter) – 4:25
4. "Loser" (Garcia, Hunter) – 7:22
5. "Beat It On Down the Line" (Fuller) – 3:49
6. "Sugaree" (Garcia, Hunter) – 8:49
7. "Jack Straw" (Weir, Hunter) – 5:30
8. "Next Time You See Me" (Bill Harvey, Earl Forest) – 4:37
9. "Tennessee Jed" (Garcia, Hunter) – 7:43
10. "El Paso" (Robbins) – 4:56
11. "Big Railroad Blues" (Noah Lewis, arranged by Grateful Dead) – 4:12
12. "Casey Jones" (Garcia, Hunter) – 5:42

Disc 4

Second set:

1. "Good Lovin'" (Rudy Clark, Artie Resnick) – 22:12
2. "Brokedown Palace" (Garcia, Hunter) – 6:06
3. "Playing in the Band" (Weir, Hart, Hunter) – 6:57
4. "Run Rudolph Run" (Marks, Brodie) – 3:39
5. "Deal" (Garcia, Hunter) – 5:50
6. "Sugar Magnolia" (Weir, Hunter) – 7:54
7. "Comes a Time" (Garcia, Hunter) – 8:41

Disc 5

1. "Truckin'" (Garcia, Lesh, Weir, Hunter) – 8:09 →
2. "Drums" (Bill Kreutzmann) – 3:21 →
3. "The Other One" (Weir, Kreutzmann) – 13:13 →
4. "Sittin' On Top of the World" (Lonnie Carter, Walter Jacobs) – 3:10 →
5. "The Other One" (Weir, Kreutzmann) – 6:02 →
6. "Not Fade Away" (Petty, Hardin) – 5:58 →
7. "Goin' Down the Road Feeling Bad" (traditional, arranged by Grateful Dead) – 6:13 →
8. "Not Fade Away" (Petty, Hardin) – 3:59

Encore:

9. "One More Saturday Night" (Weir) – 4:52

Note:

The December 10, 1971 concert was also released as the album Fox Theatre, St. Louis, MO 12-10-71.

=== October 17, 1972 – Fox Theatre ===
Disc 6

First set:

1. "Promised Land" (Chuck Berry) – 4:09
2. "Bird Song" (Garcia, Hunter) – 14:59
3. "El Paso" (Robbins) – 5:03
4. "Sugaree" (Garcia, Hunter) – 8:47
5. "Me and My Uncle" (Phillips) – 3:28
6. "Tennessee Jed" (Garcia, Hunter) – 8:24
7. "Big River" (Johnny Cash)– 5:13
8. "China Cat Sunflower" (Garcia, Hunter) – 7:06 →
9. "I Know You Rider" (traditional, arranged by Grateful Dead) – 6:01
10. "Black-Throated Wind" (Weir, Barlow) – 7:07
11. "Deal" (Garcia, Hunter) – 4:53

Disc 7

1. "Cumberland Blues" (Garcia, Lesh, Hunter) – 6:41
2. "Playing in the Band" (Weir, Hart, Hunter) – 23:25
3. "Casey Jones" (Garcia, Hunter) – 7:01

Second set:

4. "Greatest Story Ever Told" (Weir, Hart, Hunter) – 5:38
5. "Don't Ease Me In" (traditional, arranged by Grateful Dead) – 4:43
6. "Mexicali Blues" (Weir, Barlow) – 3:43
7. "Black Peter" (Garcia, Hunter) – 10:07
8. "Me and Bobby McGee" (Kris Kristofferson, Fred Foster) – 6:24
9. "Bertha" (Garcia, Hunter) – 7:04

Disc 8

1. "Jack Straw" (Weir, Hunter) – 5:19
2. "Friend of the Devil" (Garcia, John Dawson, Hunter) – 5:15
3. "Beat It On Down the Line" (Fuller) – 3:30
4. "Ramble On Rose" (Garcia, Hunter) – 7:32
5. "Mississippi Half-Step Uptown Toodeloo" (Garcia, Hunter) – 9:16
6. "Sugar Magnolia" (Weir, Hunter) – 8:50
7. "Not Fade Away" (Petty, Hardin) – 4:36 →
8. "Goin' Down the Road Feeling Bad" (traditional, arranged by Grateful Dead) – 10:30 →
9. "Not Fade Away" (Petty, Hardin) – 3:31

Encore:

10. "Uncle John's Band" (Garcia, Hunter) – 8:10
11. "Johnny B. Goode" (Berry) – 4:18

=== October 18, 1972 – Fox Theatre ===
Disc 9

First set:

1. "Bertha" (Garcia, Hunter) – 6:53
2. "Me and My Uncle" (Phillips) – 4:04
3. "Don't Ease Me In" (traditional, arranged by Grateful Dead) – 4:00
4. "Mexicali Blues" (Weir, Barlow) – 3:52
5. "Brown-Eyed Women" (Garcia, Hunter) – 5:25
6. "Beat It On Down the Line" (Fuller) – 3:26
7. "Bird Song" (Garcia, Hunter) – 13:06
8. "Big River" (Cash) – 4:53
9. "Loser" (Garcia, Hunter) – 6:49
10. "Jack Straw" (Weir, Hunter) – 5:16
11. "Big Railroad Blues" (Lewis, arranged by Grateful Dead) – 5:07
12. "El Paso" (Robbins) – 5:03
13. "China Cat Sunflower" (Garcia, Hunter) – 6:05 →
14. "I Know You Rider" (traditional, arranged by Grateful Dead) – 5:07

Disc 10

Second set:

1. "Playing in the Band" (Weir, Hart, Hunter) – 16:16 ^{[A]} →
2. "Drums" (Kreutzmann) – 2:46 ^{[A]} →
3. "Dark Star" (Garcia, Hart, Kreutzmann, Lesh, McKernan, Weir, Hunter) – 28:28 ^{[A]} →
4. "Morning Dew" (Bonnie Dobson, Tim Rose) – 11:06 ^{[A]} →
5. "Playing in the Band" (Weir, Hart, Hunter) – 5:31 ^{[A]}

Disc 11

1. "Deal" (Garcia, Hunter) – 5:13
2. "Promised Land" (Berry) – 3:59
3. "Brokedown Palace" (Garcia, Hunter) – 6:59
4. "One More Saturday Night" (Weir) – 4:38
5. "Casey Jones" (Garcia, Hunter) – 7:09

Note:

^{[A]} These tracks were also released as the album Light into Ashes.

=== October 19, 1972 – Fox Theatre ===
Disc 12

First set:

1. "Promised Land" (Berry) – 4:01
2. "Tennessee Jed" (Garcia, Hunter) – 9:08
3. "Jack Straw" (Weir, Hunter) – 5:29
4. "Don't Ease Me In" (traditional, arranged by Grateful Dead) – 3:37
5. "Black-Throated Wind" (Weir, Barlow) – 6:56
6. "Sugaree" (Garcia, Hunter) – 8:14
7. "Mexicali Blues" (Weir, Barlow) – 3:57
8. "Bertha" (Garcia, Hunter) – 6:25
9. "El Paso" (Robbins) – 4:46
10. "China Cat Sunflower" (Garcia, Hunter) – 6:33 →
11. "I Know You Rider" (traditional, arranged by Grateful Dead) – 5:54
12. "Beat It On Down the Line" (Fuller) – 3:45
13. "Dire Wolf" (Garcia, Hunter) – 4:42
14. "Around and Around" (Berry) – 5:05

Disc 13

1. "Casey Jones" (Garcia, Hunter) – 7:31

Second set:

2. "Big River" (Cash) – 5:18
3. "Friend of the Devil" (Garcia, Dawson, Hunter) – 4:10
4. "Me and My Uncle" (Phillips) – 3:51
5. "Bird Song" (Garcia, Hunter) – 13:00

Disc 14

1. "Truckin'" (Garcia, Lesh, Weir, Hunter) – 10:14 →
2. "Drums" (Kreutzmann) – 2:19 →
3. "The Other One" (Weir, Kreutzmann) – 16:24 →
4. "He's Gone" (Garcia, Hunter) – 11:03 →
5. "The Other One" (Weir, Kreutzmann) – 2:07
6. "Greatest Story Ever Told" (Weir, Hart, Hunter) – 5:42
7. "Comes a Time" (Garcia, Hunter) – 7:54
8. "Not Fade Away" (Petty, Hardin) – 5:23 →
9. "Goin' Down the Road Feeling Bad" (traditional, arranged by Grateful Dead) – 8:57 →
10. "Not Fade Away" (Petty, Hardin) – 4:04

=== October 29, 1973 – Kiel Auditorium ===
Disc 15

First set:

1. "Cold Rain and Snow" (traditional, arranged by Grateful Dead) – 6:20
2. "Beat It On Down the Line" (Fuller) – 3:50
3. "Brown-Eyed Women" (Garcia, Hunter) – 5:09
4. "Mexicali Blues" (Weir, Barlow) – 4:05
5. "Don't Ease Me In" (traditional, arranged by Grateful Dead) – 3:57
6. "Black-Throated Wind" (Weir, Barlow) – 7:20
7. "Tennessee Jed" (Garcia, Hunter) – 8:18
8. "The Race Is On" (Don Rollins) – 3:42
9. "Row Jimmy" (Garcia, Hunter) – 9:36
10. "El Paso" (Robbins) – 4:49
11. "Eyes of the World" (Garcia, Hunter) – 15:18 →
12. "China Doll" (Garcia, Hunter) – 5:38

Disc 16

1. "Around and Around" (Berry) – 5:34

Second set:

2. "Promised Land" (Berry) – 3:17 →
3. "Bertha" (Garcia, Hunter) – 6:03 →
4. "Greatest Story Ever Told" (Weir, Hart, Hunter) – 5:47
5. "Loser" (Garcia, Hunter) – 7:12
6. "Big River" (Cash) – 5:44
7. "Brokedown Palace" (Garcia, Hunter) – 6:42

Disc 17

1. "Truckin'" (Garcia, Lesh, Weir, Hunter) – 18:06 →
2. "Drums" (Kreutzmann) – 2:25 →
3. "The Other One" (Weir, Kreutzmann) – 22:13 →
4. "Wharf Rat" (Garcia, Hunter) – 11:14 →
5. "Sugar Magnolia" (Weir, Hunter) – 10:07

Encore:

6. "Casey Jones" (Garcia, Hunter) – 6:55

=== October 30, 1973 – Kiel Auditorium ===
Disc 18

First set, part 1:

1. "Here Comes Sunshine" (Garcia, Hunter) – 12:30
2. "Me and My Uncle" (Phillips) – 3:28
3. "Ramble On Rose" (Garcia, Hunter) – 6:52
4. "Looks Like Rain" (Weir, Barlow) – 8:03
5. "Deal" (Garcia, Hunter) – 5:16
6. "Mexicali Blues" (Weir, Barlow) – 3:42
7. "They Love Each Other" (Garcia, Hunter) – 6:01
8. "El Paso" (Robbins) – 4:54
9. "Row Jimmy" (Garcia, Hunter) – 10:18
10. "Jack Straw" (Weir, Hunter) – 5:08

Disc 19

First set, part 2:

1. "China Cat Sunflower" (Garcia, Hunter) – 8:57 →
2. "I Know You Rider" (traditional, arranged by Grateful Dead) – 6:09
3. "Playing in the Band" (Weir, Hart, Hunter) – 20:26

Second set, part 1:

4. "Mississippi Half-Step Uptown Toodeloo" (Garcia, Hunter) – 8:38
5. "Big River" (Cash) – 4:57

Second set, part 3:

6. "Goin' Down the Road Feeling Bad" (traditional, arranged by Grateful Dead) – 8:33 →
7. "Johnny B. Goode" (Berry) – 4:39

Encore:

8. "One More Saturday Night" (Weir) – 5:19

Disc 20

Second set, part 2:

1. "Dark Star" (Garcia, Hart, Kreutzmann, Lesh, McKernan, Weir, Hunter) – 27:57 →
2. "Stella Blue" (Garcia, Hunter) – 7:52 →
3. "Eyes of the World" (Garcia, Hunter) – 17:37 →
4. "Weather Report Suite" – 15:51
  - "Prelude" (Weir) – 1:24
  - "Part 1" (Weir, Eric Andersen) – 4:56
  - "Part 2 – Let It Grow" (Weir, Barlow) – 9:31

== Personnel ==
Grateful Dead

- Jerry Garcia – guitar, vocals
- Donna Jean Godchaux – vocals (1972, 1973)
- Keith Godchaux – keyboards
- Bill Kreutzmann – drums
- Phil Lesh – bass, vocals
- Ron "Pigpen" McKernan – keyboards, harmonica, vocals (1971)
- Bob Weir – guitar, vocals

Production

- Produced by Grateful Dead
- Produced for release by David Lemieux
- Executive producer: Mark Pinkus
- Associate producers: Ivette Ramos, Doran Tyson
- Mastering: Jeffrey Norman
- Recording: Rex Jackson (1971), Owsley Stanley (1972), Kidd Candelario (1973)
- Tape restoration and speed correction: Jamie Howarth, John Chester
- Art direction: Rory Wilson, Liane Plant
- Original art: Liane Plant
- Package design: Rory Wilson
- Photos: Dan Fong, Bob Marks, Dean Mathewson, Rosie McGee, Alvan Meyerowitz, Chuck Pulin, Amalie R. Rothschild, Michael Scott
- Liner notes essays: Nicholas G. Meriwether, Sam Cutler, Bill Weber, Caleb Kennedy, Starfinder Stanley & Hawk & Pete Bell, David Lemieux

== Charts ==
Chart performance for Listen to the River: St. Louis '71 '72 '73
Chart (2021)	Peak position
US Billboard 200	122
US Top Rock Albums (Billboard)	15
