= Lyceum '72: The Complete Recordings =

Live album and box set by Grateful Dead
- Released: July 29, 2022
- Recorded: May 23 – 26, 1972
- Venues: Lyceum Theatre, London
- Genre: Rock
- Label: Rhino
- Producer: Grateful Dead

Grateful Dead chronology
Dave's Picks Volume 42 (2022)	Lyceum '72: The Complete Recordings (2022)	Lyceum Theatre, London, England 5/26/72 (2022)

Grateful Dead concert box set chronology
Listen to the River: St. Louis '71 '72 '73 (2021)	Lyceum '72: The Complete Recordings (2022)	In and Out of the Garden: Madison Square Garden '81, '82, '83 (2022)

Lyceum '72: The Complete Recordings is a live box set by the rock band the Grateful Dead. Packaged as a box set of 24 LPs, it contains four complete concerts recorded at the Lyceum Theatre in London on May 23, 24, 25, and 26, 1972. It was released on July 29, 2022, in a limited edition of 4,000 copies.

The Lyceum concerts were the last four shows of the Grateful Dead's 1972 tour of Europe. Several of the songs on Lyceum '72: The Complete Recordings were previously released on the albums Europe '72 (1972), Steppin' Out with the Grateful Dead: England '72 (2002), and Europe '72 Volume 2 (2011). Additionally, the entire concert tour was released in 2011 as a 73-CD box set called Europe '72: The Complete Recordings. The concert from May 26 was released – also on July 29, 2022 – as a four-CD album called Lyceum Theatre, London, England 5/26/72.

== Track listing ==
Note: Disc 6 side B and disc 24 side B are decorative etchings.

=== May 23, 1972 ===
Disc 1 side A

First set:

1. "Promised Land" (Chuck Berry)
2. "Sugaree" (Jerry Garcia, Robert Hunter)
3. "Mr. Charlie" (Ron "Pigpen" McKernan, Hunter)
4. "Black-Throated Wind" (Bob Weir, John Perry Barlow)

Disc 1 side B

1. "Tennessee Jed" (Garcia, Hunter)
2. "Next Time You See Me" (William Harvey, Earl Forest)
3. "Jack Straw" (Weir, Hunter)

Disc 2 side A

1. "China Cat Sunflower" > (Garcia, Hunter)
2. "I Know You Rider" (traditional, arranged by Grateful Dead)
3. "Me and My Uncle" (John Phillips)
4. "Chinatown Shuffle" (McKernan)
5. "Big Railroad Blues" (Noah Lewis, arranged by Grateful Dead)

Disc 2 side B

1. "The Stranger (Two Souls in Communion)" (McKernan)
2. "Playing in the Band" (Weir, Mickey Hart, Hunter)

Disc 3 side A

1. "Sitting on Top of the World" (Lonnie Carter, Walter Jacobs)
2. "Rockin' Pneumonia and the Boogie Woogie Flu" (Huey "Piano" Smith)
3. "Mexicali Blues" (Weir, Barlow)
4. "Good Lovin' " (Rudy Clark, Arthur Resnick)

Disc 3 side B

1. "Casey Jones" (Garcia, Hunter)

Second set:

2. "Ramble On Rose" (Garcia, Hunter)

Disc 4 side A

1. "Dark Star" (Garcia, Hart, Bill Kreutzmann, Phil Lesh, McKernan, Weir, Hunter)

Disc 4 side B

1. "Dark Star" > (Garcia, Hart, Kreutzmann, Lesh, McKernan, Weir, Hunter)
2. "Morning Dew" (Bonnie Dobson, Tim Rose)

Disc 5 side A

1. "He's Gone" (Garcia, Hunter)
2. "Sugar Magnolia" (Weir, Hunter)
3. "Comes a Time" (Garcia, Hunter)

Disc 5 side B

1. "Goin' Down the Road Feeling Bad" > (traditional, arranged by Grateful Dead)
2. "Not Fade Away" > (Norman Petty, Charles Hardin)
3. "Hey Bo Diddley" > (Bo Diddley)
4. "Not Fade Away" (Petty, Hardin)

Disc 6 side A

Encore:

1. "Uncle John's Band" (Garcia, Hunter)

=== May 24, 1972 ===
Disc 7 side A

First set:

1. "Cold Rain and Snow" (traditional, arranged by Grateful Dead)
2. "Beat It On Down the Line" (Jesse Fuller)
3. "Mr. Charlie" (McKernan, Hunter)
4. "Deal" (Garcia, Hunter)
5. "Me and My Uncle" (Phillips)

Disc 7 side B

1. "Hurts Me Too" (Elmore James, Marshall Sehorn)
2. "Dire Wolf" (Garcia, Hunter)
3. "Black-Throated Wind" (Weir, Barlow)
4. "Chinatown Shuffle" (McKernan)

Disc 8 side A

1. "China Cat Sunflower" > (Garcia, Hunter)
2. "I Know You Rider" (traditional, arranged by Grateful Dead)
3. "Playing in the Band" (Weir, Hart, Hunter)

Disc 8 side B

1. "You Win Again" (Hank Williams)
2. "Jack Straw" (Weir, Hunter)
3. "Casey Jones" (Garcia, Hunter)

Second set:

4. "Rockin' Pneumonia and the Boogie Woogie Flu" (Smith)

Disc 9 side A

1. "Mexicali Blues" (Weir, Barlow)
2. "Black Peter" (Garcia, Hunter)
3. "Mexican Hat Dance" tuning

Disc 9 side B

1. "Truckin' " > (Garcia, Lesh, Weir, Hunter)
2. "Drums" > (Kreutzmann)
3. "The Other One" (Weir, Kreutzmann)

Disc 10 side A

1. "The Other One" (Weir, Kreutzmann)

Disc 10 side B

1. "Sing Me Back Home" (Merle Haggard)
2. "Sugar Magnolia" (Weir, Hunter)

Disc 11 side A

1. "Turn On Your Lovelight" > (Joseph Scott, Deadric Malone)
2. "The Stranger (Two Souls in Communion)" (McKernan)

Disc 11 side B

Encore:

1. "One More Saturday Night" (Weir)

=== May 25, 1972 ===
Disc 12 side A

First set:

1. "Promised Land" (Berry)
2. "Brown-Eyed Women" (Garcia, Hunter)
3. "Big Boss Man" (Al Smith, Luther Dixon)
4. "Black-Throated Wind" (Weir, Barlow)

Disc 12 side B

1. "Tennessee Jed" (Garcia, Hunter)
2. "Mr. Charlie" (McKernan, Hunter)
3. "Jack Straw" (Weir, Hunter)

Disc 13 side A

1. "China Cat Sunflower" > (Garcia, Hunter)
2. "I Know You Rider" (traditional, arranged by Grateful Dead)
3. "Me and Bobby McGee" (Chris Kristofferson, Fred Foster)

Disc 13 side B

1. "Good Lovin'" (Clark, Resnick)

Disc 14 side A

1. "Playing in the Band" (Weir, Hart, Hunter)

Disc 14 side B

1. "Brokedown Palace" (Garcia, Hunter)
2. "Casey Jones" (Garcia, Hunter)

Second set:

3. "Me and My Uncle" (Phillips)

Disc 15 side A

1. "Big Railroad Blues" (Lewis, arranged by Grateful Dead)
2. "Chinatown Shuffle" (McKernan)
3. "Ramble On Rose" (Garcia, Hunter)

Disc 15 side B

1. "Uncle John's Band" > (Garcia, Hunter)
2. "Wharf Rat" (Garcia, Hunter)

Disc 16 side A

1. "Dark Star" (Garcia, Hart, Kreutzmann, Lesh, McKernan, Weir, Hunter)

Disc 16 side B

1. "Dark Star" > (Garcia, Hart, Kreutzmann, Lesh, McKernan, Weir, Hunter)
2. "Sugar Magnolia" (Weir, Hunter)

Disc 17 side A

1. "Comes a Time" (Garcia, Hunter)
2. "El Paso" (Marty Robbins)
3. "Sitting on Top of the World" (Carter, Jacobs)

Disc 17 side B

1. "Goin' Down the Road Feeling Bad" > (traditional, arranged by Grateful Dead)
2. "One More Saturday Night" (Weir)

=== May 26, 1972 ===
Disc 18 side A

First set:

1. "Promised Land" (Berry)
2. "Sugaree" (Garcia, Hunter)
3. "Mr. Charlie" (McKernan, Hunter)
4. "Black-Throated Wind" (Weir, Barlow)

Disc 18 side B

1. "Loser" (Garcia, Hunter)
2. "Next Time You See Me" (Harvey, Forest)
3. "El Paso" (Robbins)

Disc 19 side A

1. "Dire Wolf" (Garcia, Hunter)
2. "The Stranger (Two Souls in Communion)" (McKernan)

Disc 19 side B

1. "Playing in the Band" (Weir, Hart, Hunter)

Disc 20 side A

1. "He's Gone" (Garcia, Hunter)
2. "Cumberland Blues" (Garcia, Lesh, Hunter)
3. "Jack Straw" (Weir, Hunter)

Disc 20 side B

1. "Chinatown Shuffle" (McKernan)
2. "China Cat Sunflower" > (Garcia, Hunter)
3. "I Know You Rider" (traditional, arranged by Grateful Dead)

Disc 21 side A

1. "Not Fade Away" > (Petty, Hardin)
2. "Goin' Down the Road Feeling Bad" > (traditional, arranged by Grateful Dead)
3. "Not Fade Away" (Petty, Hardin)

Disc 21 side B

Second set:

1. "Truckin'" (Garcia, Lesh, Weir, Hunter)

Disc 22 side A

1. "The Other One" > (Weir, Kreutzmann)
2. "Drums" > (Kreutzmann)
3. "The Other One" (Weir, Kreutzmann)

Disc 22 side B

1. "The Other One" > (Weir, Kreutzmann)
2. "Morning Dew" (Dobson, Rose)

Disc 23 side A

1. "The Other One" > (Weir, Kreutzmann)
2. "Sing Me Back Home" (Haggard)

Disc 23 side B

1. "Me and My Uncle" (Phillips)
2. "Ramble On Rose" (Garcia, Hunter)
3. "Sugar Magnolia" (Weir, Hunter)

Disc 24 side A

1. "Casey Jones" (Garcia, Hunter)

Encore:

2. "One More Saturday Night" (Weir)

== Personnel ==
Grateful Dead

- Jerry Garcia – guitar, vocals
- Donna Jean Godchaux – vocals
- Keith Godchaux – piano
- Bill Kreutzmann – drums
- Phil Lesh – bass, vocals
- Ron "Pigpen" McKernan – organ, harmonica, percussion, vocals
- Bob Weir – guitar, vocals

Production

- Produced by Grateful Dead
- Produced for release by David Lemieux
- Recording: Betty Cantor, Janet Furman, Bob Matthews, Rosie, Wizard
- Mixing: Jeffrey Norman
- Mastering: David Glasser
- Artwork: Brian Blomerth, Scott McDougall
- Liner notes essay: Nicholas Meriwether
