= Dave's Picks Volume 43 =

Live album by Grateful Dead
- Released: July 29, 2022
- Recorded: November 2, 1969; December 26, 1969
- Venue: Family Dog; McFarlin Auditorium
- Genre: Rock
- Length: 235:55
- Label: Rhino
- Producer: Grateful Dead

Grateful Dead chronology
Lyceum Theatre, London, England 5/26/72 (2022)	Dave's Picks Volume 43 (2022)	In and Out of the Garden: Madison Square Garden '81, '82, '83 (2022)

Dave's Picks Volume 43 is a three-CD live album by the rock band the Grateful Dead. It was recorded on November 2, 1969 at the Family Dog at the Great Highway in San Francisco, California, and on December 26, 1969 at McFarlin Memorial Auditorium in University Park, Texas. It was released on July 29, 2022, in a limited edition of 25,000 copies.

The two concerts were taped by audio engineer and LSD chemist Owsley "Bear" Stanley. They document the band in a transition period between the recording of the psychedelic rock album Live/Dead and the folk rock album Workingman's Dead.

Upon release, the album debuted on the Billboard 200 at number 11 on the week of August 13, 2022, becoming the group's second-highest charting album, behind 1987's In the Dark.

The third song of the second set of the December 26 concert, "Cold Rain and Snow", was omitted due to lack of space. It was included as a bonus track on Dave's Picks Volume 44.

== Critical reception ==
On AllMusic Timothy Monger said, "For this special two-concert set, archivist David Lemieux dug into Bear's personal vault of sealed banana boxes to uncover a pair of late 1969 Grateful Dead gems.... Both are notable for their clarity of sound, 20-plus-minute versions of "Dark Star", and prime late-'60s glory."

== Track listing ==
Disc 1

Family Dog, November 2, 1969:

1. "Cold Rain and Snow" (traditional, arranged by Grateful Dead) – 6:19
2. "In the Midnight Hour" (Steve Cropper, Wilson Pickett) – 8:23
3. "Seasons of My Heart" (George Jones, Darrell Edwards) – 4:32
4. "Mama Tried" (Merle Haggard) – 2:55
5. "Next Time You See Me" (Bill Harvey, Earl Forest) – 4:51
6. "Good Lovin'" (Rudy Clark, Arthur Resnick) – 9:23
7. "Big Boss Man" (Al Smith, Luther Dixon) – 6:59
8. "Casey Jones" (Jerry Garcia, Robert Hunter) – 4:39
9. "Dancing in the Street" (William "Mickey" Stevenson, Marvin Gaye, Ivy Jo Hunter) – 9:06

McFarlin Auditorium, December 26, 1969, set one:

10. "The Monkey and the Engineer" (Jesse Fuller) – 2:41
11. "Little Sadie" (traditional, arranged by Grateful Dead) – 3:57
12. "Long Black Limousine" (Vern Stovall, Bobby George) – 6:09
13. "I've Been All Around This World" (traditional, arranged by Grateful Dead) – 5:03
14. "Gathering Flowers for the Master's Bouquet" (Marvin Baumgardner) – 3:10

Disc 2

Family Dog, November 2, 1969:

1. "Dark Star" (Garcia, Mickey Hart, Bill Kreutzmann, Phil Lesh, Ron "Pigpen" McKernan, Bob Weir, Hunter) – 30:32
2. "St. Stephen" (Garcia, Lesh, Hunter) – 9:43
3. "The Eleven" (Lesh, Hunter) – 8:59
4. "Death Don't Have No Mercy" (Reverend Gary Davis) – 11:47

McFarlin Auditorium, December 26, 1969, set one continued:

5. "Black Peter" (Garcia, Hunter) – 11:05
6. "Uncle John's Band" (Garcia, Hunter) – 6:32

Disc 3

McFarlin Auditorium, December 26, 1969, set two:

1. "Casey Jones" (Garcia, Hunter) – 5:12
2. "Hard to Handle" (Otis Redding, Alvertis Isbell, Allen Jones) – 4:54
3. "China Cat Sunflower (Garcia, Hunter) – 5:55
4. "I Know You Rider" (traditional, arranged by Grateful Dead) – 5:26
5. "High Time" (Garcia, Hunter) – 8:04
6. "Me and My Uncle" (John Phillips) – 4:14
7. "Dark Star" (Garcia, Hart, Kreutzmann, Lesh, McKernan, Weir, Hunter) – 24:52
8. "New Speedway Boogie" (Garcia, Hunter) – 5:36
9. "Turn On Your Lovelight" (Joe Scott, Deadric Malone) – 14:54

== Personnel ==
Grateful Dead

- Jerry Garcia – guitar, vocals
- Bob Weir – guitar, vocals
- Ron "Pigpen" McKernan – harmonica, percussion, vocals
- Tom Constanten – keyboards
- Phil Lesh – bass, vocals
- Bill Kreutzmann – drums
- Mickey Hart – drums

Production

- Produced by Grateful Dead
- Produced for release by David Lemieux
- Mastering: Jeffrey Norman
- Recording: Owsley Stanley
- Tape transfers and restoration: Jamie Howarth and John K. Chester - Plangent Processes
- Art direction, design: Steve Vance
- Cover art: Matt J. Adams
- Photos: Rosie McGee
- Liner notes: Starfinder Stanley, Hawk, Pete Bell, David Lemieux
