= Lyceum Theatre, London, England 5/26/72 =

Live album by Grateful Dead
- Released: July 29, 2022
- Recorded: May 26, 1972
- Venue: Lyceum Theatre, London
- Genre: Rock
- Length: 222:53
- Label: Rhino
- Producer: Grateful Dead

Grateful Dead chronology
Lyceum '72: The Complete Recordings (2022)	Lyceum Theatre, London, England 5/26/72 (2022)	Dave's Picks Volume 43 (2022)

Lyceum Theatre, London, England 5/26/72 is a four-CD live album by the rock band the Grateful Dead. It contains the complete concert recorded at the Lyceum Theatre on May 26, 1972 – the last show of the band's Europe '72 tour. It was released on July 29, 2022.

== Background ==
The concert was the last one of the band's Europe tour in 1972, and the last one that featured founding member Ron "Pigpen" McKernan as a lead vocalist. He sang several songs, including "Mr. Charlie", "Chinatown Shuffle" and "The Stranger (Two Souls in Communion)", the latter of which he had just written.

== Release ==
The same concert was included in the 24-LP box set Lyceum '72: The Complete Recordings, which was also released on July 29, 2022. Additionally, it was included in the 73-CD box set Europe '72: The Complete Recordings, released on September 1, 2011. All the concerts from Europe '72: The Complete Recordings were also released, in several batches, as individual albums; the 5/26/72 show came out on December 13, 2011.

The songs "Truckin' ", "Morning Dew", "Ramble On Rose", and "One More Saturday Night" were previously released on the album Europe '72 (1972). However, that album contained vocal overdubs, and slightly different guitar and piano overdubs to correct some mistakes, and most of the banter with the audience was removed. "Jack Straw" was previously released on Steppin' Out with the Grateful Dead: England '72 (2002), and "Sing Me Back Home" was previously released on Europe '72 Volume 2 (2011).

The album's liner notes contain an essay about the concert written by David Gans, a music journalist and the host of the syndicated radio show The Grateful Dead Hour.

At the May 26, 1972, concert, the opening act was the New Riders of the Purple Sage. Their performance was released as an album called Lyceum '72.

== Track listing ==
Disc 1

First set:

1. "Promised Land" (Chuck Berry) – 3:48
2. "Sugaree" (Jerry Garcia, Robert Hunter) – 7:34
3. "Mr. Charlie" (Ron "Pigpen" McKernan, Hunter) – 3:55
4. "Black-Throated Wind" (Bob Weir, John Perry Barlow) – 6:26
5. "Loser" (Garcia, Hunter) – 6:47
6. "Next Time You See Me" (Bill Harvey, Earl Forest) – 4:52
7. "El Paso" (Marty Robbins) – 4:53
8. "Dire Wolf" (Garcia, Hunter) – 4:27
9. "The Stranger (Two Souls in Communion)" (McKernan) – 7:50
10. "Playing in the Band" (Weir, Mickey Hart, Hunter) – 18:01

Disc 2

1. "He's Gone" (Garcia, Hunter) – 9:09
2. "Cumberland Blues" (Garcia, Phil Lesh, Hunter) – 5:28
3. "Jack Straw" (Weir, Hunter) – 5:18
4. "Chinatown Shuffle" (McKernan) – 2:56
5. "China Cat Sunflower" > (Garcia, Hunter) – 6:16
6. "I Know You Rider" (traditional, arranged by Grateful Dead) – 5:46
7. "Not Fade Away" > (Norman Petty, Charles Hardin) – 6:42
8. "Goin' Down the Road Feeling Bad" > (traditional, arranged by Grateful Dead) – 8:16
9. "Not Fade Away" (Petty, Hardin) – 2:59

Disc 3

Second set:

1. "Truckin' " > (Garcia, Lesh, Weir, Hunter) – 18:57
2. "The Other One" > (Weir, Bill Kreutzmann) – 9:09
3. "Drums" > (Kreutzmann) – 2:17
4. "The Other One" > (Weir, Kreutzmann) – 12:19
5. "Morning Dew" > (Bonnie Dobson, Tim Rose) – 11:47
6. "The Other One" > (Weir, Kreutzmann) – 5:47
7. "Sing Me Back Home" (Merle Haggard) – 10:58

Disc 4

1. "Me and My Uncle" (John Phillips) – 3:45
2. "Ramble On Rose" (Garcia, Hunter) – 6:21
3. "Sugar Magnolia" (Weir, Hunter) – 8:01
4. "Casey Jones" (Garcia, Hunter) – 6:41

Encore:

5. "One More Saturday Night" (Weir) – 5:09

== Personnel ==
Grateful Dead

- Jerry Garcia – guitar, vocals
- Donna Jean Godchaux – vocals
- Keith Godchaux – piano
- Bill Kreutzmann – drums
- Phil Lesh – bass, vocals
- Ron "Pigpen" McKernan – organ, harmonica, percussion, vocals
- Bob Weir – guitar, vocals

Production

- Produced for release by David Lemieux
- Mixing: Jeffrey Norman
- Mastering: David Glasser
- Recording: Betty Cantor, Janet Furman, Bob Matthews, Rosie, Wizard
- Cover illustration: Scott McDougall
- Photography: Mary Ann Mayer
- Package design: Steve Vance
- Liner notes: David Gans

== Charts ==
Chart performance for Lyceum Theatre, London, England 5/26/72
Chart (2022)	Peak position
US Billboard 200	166

== See also ==
- Europe '72: The Complete Recordings – a box set of live recordings by the rock band, containing all of the band's spring 1972 concert tour of Europe
