= Madison Square Garden, New York, NY 3/9/81 =

Live album by Grateful Dead
- Released: September 23, 2022
- Recorded: March 9, 1981
- Venue: Madison Square Garden
- Genre: Rock
- Length: 172:52
- Label: Rhino
- Producer: Grateful Dead

Grateful Dead chronology
In and Out of the Garden: Madison Square Garden '81, '82, '83 (2022)	Madison Square Garden, New York, NY 3/9/81 (2022)	Dave's Picks Volume 44 (2022)

Madison Square Garden, New York, NY 3/9/81 is a three-CD live album by the rock band the Grateful Dead. It contains the complete concert recorded at Madison Square Garden in New York City on March 9, 1981. It was released on September 23, 2022.

The same recording was released on the same day as part of the six-concert, 17-CD box set In and Out of the Garden: Madison Square Garden '81, '82, '83.

Whilst there was no vinyl version available on release, a 5LP version was released as part of "Rocktober' in October 2023 by Rhino.

== Track listing ==
Disc 1

First set:

1. "Feel Like a Stranger" (Bob Weir, John Perry Barlow) – 9:07
2. "Althea" (Jerry Garcia, Robert Hunter) – 7:52
3. "C.C. Rider" (traditional, arranged by Grateful Dead) – 8:00
4. "Ramble On Rose" > (Garcia, Hunter) – 7:41
5. "El Paso" (Marty Robbins) – 5:31
6. "Deep Elem Blues" (traditional, arranged by Grateful Dead) – 7:03
7. "Beat It On Down the Line" (Jesse Fuller) – 3:58
8. "Bird Song" (Garcia, Hunter) – 11:15
9. "New Minglewood Blues" (traditional, arranged by Grateful Dead) – 7:02

Disc 2

Second set:

1. "China Cat Sunflower" > (Garcia, Hunter) – 9:33
2. "I Know You Rider" > (traditional, arranged by Grateful Dead) – 6:11
3. "Samson and Delilah" (traditional, arranged by Grateful Dead) – 7:32
4. "Ship of Fools" (Garcia, Hunter) – 8:22

Disc 3

1. "Estimated Prophet" > (Weir, Barlow) – 14:07
2. "Uncle John's Band" > (Garcia, Hunter) – 11:46
3. "Drums" > (Mickey Hart, Bill Kreutzmann) – 10:32
4. "Space" > (Garcia, Phil Lesh, Weir) – 7:30
5. "The Other One" > (Weir, Kreutzmann) – 7:47
6. "Stella Blue" > (Garcia, Hunter) – 9:50
7. "Good Lovin'" (Rudy Clark, Arthur Resnick) – 6:51

Encore:

8. "U.S. Blues" (Garcia, Hunter) – 5:32

== Personnel ==
Grateful Dead

- Jerry Garcia – guitar, vocals
- Mickey Hart – drums
- Bill Kreutzmann – drums
- Phil Lesh – bass
- Brent Mydland – keyboards, vocals
- Bob Weir – guitar, vocals

Production

- Produced by Grateful Dead
- Produced for release by David Lemieux
- Executive producer: Mark Pinkus
- Associate producers: Ivette Ramos, Doran Tyson
- Mastering: Jeffrey Norman
- Recording: Dan Healy
- Tape restoration and speed correction: Jamie Howarth, John Chester
- Art direction: Dave Van Patten, Lisa Glines, Doran Tyson
- Original art: Dave Van Patten
- Design: Lisa Glines
- Photos: Greg Gear, Bob Minkin, Mark Jaffee, Paul Slattery
- Liner notes: David Fricke

== Charts ==
Chart performance for Madison Square Garden, New York, NY 3/9/81
Chart (2022)	Peak position
Scottish Albums (OCC)	73
