= Dave's Picks Volume 42 =

Live album by Grateful Dead
- Released: April 29, 2022
- Recorded: February 23, 1974
- Venue: Winterland, San Francisco
- Genre: Rock
- Length: 209:42 (Bonus disc 79:09)
- Label: Rhino
- Producer: Grateful Dead

Grateful Dead chronology
Dave's Picks Volume 41 (2021)	Dave's Picks Volume 42 (2022)	Lyceum '72: The Complete Recordings (2022)

Alternative cover
- Dave's Picks 2022 Bonus Disc

Dave's Picks Volume 42 is a three-CD live album by the rock band the Grateful Dead. It contains the complete concert recorded on February 23, 1974 at the Winterland Arena in San Francisco. It was released on April 29, 2022, in a limited edition of 25,000 copies.

Some copies of the album include a bonus CD with songs recorded at the same venue the previous night.

The concert from the following night, also at Winterland, was released in 2015 as Dave's Picks Volume 13.

== Critical reception ==
On AllMusic Timothy Monger said, "Captured at one of their regular haunts, San Francisco's Winterland Ballroom, on the night of Saturday, February 23, this blazing gig heralds the dawn of the band's fabled Wall of Sound PA system, resulting in a clear, clean recording of era classics like "Row Jimmy", "Stella Blue", and "Eyes of the World" from their 1973 studio set Wake of the Flood."

== Track listing ==
Disc 1

First set:

1. "Around and Around" (Chuck Berry) – 5:17
2. "Dire Wolf" (Jerry Garcia, Robert Hunter) – 4:41
3. "Me and Bobby McGee" (Kris Kristofferson, Fred Foster) – 6:08
4. "Sugaree" (Garcia, Hunter) – 7:41
5. "Mexicali Blues" (Bob Weir, John Perry Barlow) – 3:44
6. "Here Comes Sunshine" (Garcia, Hunter) – 11:43
7. "Beat It On Down the Line" (Jesse Fuller) – 3:55
8. "Ship of Fools" (Garcia, Hunter) – 6:05
9. "Jack Straw" (Weir, Hunter) – 5:05
10. "Deal" (Garcia, Hunter) – 4:55
11. "Promised Land" > (Berry) – 3:07
12. "Bertha" > (Garcia, Hunter) – 6:04
13. "Greatest Story Ever Told" (Weir, Mickey Hart, Hunter) – 5:29

Disc 2

Second set:

1. "Row Jimmy" (Garcia, Hunter) – 9:36
2. "Weather Report Suite" > – 18:50
  - "Prelude" (Weir) – 1:21
  - "Part I" (Weir, Eric Andersen) – 4:29
  - "Part II (Let It Grow)" (Weir, Barlow) – 13:00
3. "Stella Blue" (Garcia, Hunter) – 9:05
4. "Big River" (Johnny Cash) – 5:10
5. "Ramble On Rose" (Garcia, Hunter) – 7:09
6. "Me and My Uncle" (John Phillips) – 3:44

Second encore:

7. "Johnny B. Goode" > (Berry) – 4:16
8. "And We Bid You Goodnight" (traditional, arranged by Grateful Dead) – 3:23

Disc 3

Second set, continued:

1. "He's Gone" > (Garcia, Hunter) – 14:18
2. "Truckin'" > (Garcia, Phil Lesh, Weir, Hunter) – 8:09
3. "Drums" > (Bill Kreutzmann) – 3:29
4. "The Other One" > (Weir, Kreutzmann) – 20:44
5. "Eyes of the World" (Garcia, Hunter) – 14:42
6. "One More Saturday Night" (Weir) – 5:38

First encore:

7. "Casey Jones" (Garcia, Hunter) – 7:31

Dave's Picks 2022 Bonus Disc

February 22, 1974 Winterland selections:

1. "U.S. Blues" (Garcia, Hunter) – 5:47
2. "Brown-Eyed Women" (Garcia, Hunter) – 5:08
3. "It Must Have Been the Roses" (Hunter) – 5:07
4. "Black-Throated Wind" (Weir, Barlow) – 6:50
5. "Loose Lucy" (Garcia, Hunter) – 7:23
6. "Playing in the Band" (Weir, Hart, Hunter) – 21:03
7. "Ship of Fools" (Garcia, Hunter) – 6:12
8. "China Cat Sunflower" > (Garcia, Hunter) – 8:50
9. "I Know You Rider" (traditional, arranged by Grateful Dead) – 6:05
10. "Uncle John's Band" (Garcia, Hunter) – 6:43

== Personnel ==
Grateful Dead

- Jerry Garcia – guitar, vocals
- Donna Jean Godchaux – vocals
- Keith Godchaux – keyboards
- Bill Kreutzmann – drums
- Phil Lesh – bass, vocals
- Bob Weir – guitar, vocals

Production

- Produced by Grateful Dead
- Produced for release by David Lemieux
- Mastering: Jeffrey Norman
- Recording: Kidd Candelario
- Art direction, design: Steve Vance
- Cover art: Matt J. Adams
- Photos: Steve Caraway
- Liner notes: David Lemieux

== Charts ==
Chart performance for Dave's Picks Volume 42
Chart (2022)	Peak position
US Billboard 200	12
US Top Rock Albums (Billboard)	1
