= In and Out of the Garden: Madison Square Garden '81, '82, '83 =

Live album and box set by Grateful Dead
- Released: September 23, 2022
- Recorded: March 9 – 10, 1981; September 20 – 21, 1982; October 11 – 12, 1983
- Venue: Madison Square Garden
- Genre: Rock
- Label: Rhino
- Producer: Grateful Dead

Grateful Dead chronology
Dave's Picks Volume 43 (2022)	In and Out of the Garden: Madison Square Garden '81, '82, '83 (2022)	Madison Square Garden, New York, NY 3/9/81 (2022)

Grateful Dead concert box set chronology
Lyceum '72: The Complete Recordings (2022)	In and Out of the Garden: Madison Square Garden '81, '82, '83 (2022)	Here Comes Sunshine 1973 (2023)

In and Out of the Garden: Madison Square Garden '81, '82, '83 is a live album by the rock band the Grateful Dead. Packaged as a box set, it contains six complete concerts on 17 CDs. It was recorded at Madison Square Garden in New York City in 1981, 1982, and 1983. It was released on September 23, 2022, in a limited edition of 12,500 numbered copies.

The March 9, 1981 concert included in In and Out of the Garden was also released on September 23, 2022, as a three-CD album called Madison Square Garden, New York, NY 3/9/81.

The title of the box set is taken from the opening verse of the song "St. Stephen", from their album Aoxomoxoa and performed during the 10/11/83 show.

In and Out of the Garden won a Grammy award for Best Boxed or Special Limited Edition Package. It was the Grateful Dead's second Grammy, following their 2007 Lifetime Achievement Award.

== Track listing ==
=== March 9, 1981 ===
Disc 1

First set:

1. "Feel Like a Stranger" (Bob Weir, John Perry Barlow) – 9:07
2. "Althea" (Jerry Garcia, Robert Hunter) – 7:52
3. "C.C. Rider" (traditional, arranged by Grateful Dead) – 8:00
4. "Ramble On Rose" > (Garcia, Hunter) – 7:41
5. "El Paso" (Marty Robbins) – 5:31
6. "Deep Elem Blues" (traditional, arranged by Grateful Dead) – 7:03
7. "Beat It On Down the Line" (Jesse Fuller) – 3:58
8. "Bird Song" (Garcia, Hunter) – 11:15
9. "All New Minglewood Blues" (traditional, arranged by Grateful Dead) – 7:02

Disc 2

Second set:

1. "China Cat Sunflower" > (Garcia, Hunter) – 9:33
2. "I Know You Rider" > (traditional, arranged by Grateful Dead) – 6:11
3. "Samson and Delilah" (traditional, arranged by Grateful Dead) – 7:32
4. "Ship of Fools" (Garcia, Hunter) – 8:22

Disc 3

1. "Estimated Prophet" > (Weir, Barlow) – 14:07
2. "Uncle John's Band" > (Garcia, Hunter) – 11:46
3. "Drums" > (Mickey Hart, Bill Kreutzmann) – 10:32
4. "Space" > (Garcia, Phil Lesh, Weir) – 7:30
5. "The Other One" > (Weir, Kreutzmann) – 7:47
6. "Stella Blue" > (Garcia, Hunter) – 9:50
7. "Good Lovin'" (Rudy Clark, Arthur Resnick) – 6:51

Encore:

8. "U.S. Blues" (Garcia, Hunter) – 5:32

=== March 10, 1981 ===
Disc 4

First set:

1. "Mississippi Half-Step Uptown Toodeloo" > (Garcia, Hunter)
2. "Franklin’s Tower" > (Garcia, Kreutzmann, Hunter)
3. "Me and My Uncle" (John Phillips)
4. "It Must Have Been the Roses" > (Hunter)
5. "Little Red Rooster" (Willie Dixon)
6. "Don’t Ease Me In" (traditional, arranged by Grateful Dead)
7. "Lazy Lightning" > (Weir, Barlow)
8. "Supplication" (Weir, Barlow)
9. "Brown-Eyed Women" > (Garcia, Hunter)
10. "Looks Like Rain" > (Weir, Barlow)
11. "Deal" (Garcia, Hunter)

Disc 5

Second set:

1. "Scarlet Begonias" > (Garcia, Hunter)
2. "Fire on the Mountain" > (Hart, Hunter)
3. "Lost Sailor" > (Weir, Barlow)
4. "Saint of Circumstance" > (Weir, Barlow)
5. "Jam" > (Grateful Dead)
6. "Drums" > (Hart, Kreutzmann)

Disc 6

1. "Space" > (Garcia, Lesh, Weir)
2. "The Wheel" > (Garcia, Hunter)
3. "China Doll" > (Garcia, Hunter)
4. "Truckin'" > (Garcia, Lesh, Weir, Hunter)
5. "Sugar Magnolia" (Weir, Hunter)

Encore:

6. "(I Can't Get No) Satisfaction" > (Mick Jagger, Keith Richards)
7. "Brokedown Palace" (Garcia, Hunter)

=== September 20, 1982 ===
Disc 7

First set:

1. "Shakedown Street" > (Garcia, Hunter)
2. "All New Minglewood Blues" (traditional, arranged by Grateful Dead)
3. "Candyman" > (Garcia, Hunter)
4. "El Paso" (Robbins)
5. "Dupree's Diamond Blues" (Garcia, Hunter)
6. "It's All Over Now" (Bobby Womack, Shirley Womack)
7. "Never Trust a Woman" (Brent Mydland)
8. "Row Jimmy" (Garcia, Hunter)
9. "Throwing Stones" > (Weir, Barlow)
10. "Keep Your Day Job" (Garcia, Hunter)

Disc 8

Second set:

1. "Scarlet Begonias" > (Garcia, Hunter)
2. "Fire On The Mountain" (Hart, Hunter)
3. "Man Smart (Woman Smarter)" (Norman Span)

Disc 9

1. "Terrapin Station" > (Garcia, Hunter)
2. "Drums" > (Hart, Kreutzmann)
3. "Space" > (Garcia, Lesh, Weir)
4. "Spanish Jam" > (Grateful Dead)
5. "Truckin'" > (Garcia, Lesh, Weir, Hunter)
6. "The Other One" > (Weir, Kreutzmann)
7. "Stella Blue" > (Garcia, Hunter)
8. "Sugar Magnolia" (Weir, Hunter)

Encore:

9. "Touch of Grey" (Garcia, Hunter)

=== September 21, 1982 ===
Disc 10

First set:

1. "Playing in the Band" > (Weir, Hart, Hunter)
2. "Crazy Fingers" > (Garcia, Hunter)
3. "Me and My Uncle" > (Phillips)
4. "Big River" (Johnny Cash)
5. "West L.A. Fadeaway" (Garcia, Hunter)
6. "Beat It On Down the Line" (Fuller)
7. "Loser" (Garcia, Hunter)
8. "Looks Like Rain" (Weir, Barlow)
9. "China Cat Sunflower" > (Garcia, Hunter)
10. "I Know You Rider" (traditional, arranged by Grateful Dead)

Disc 11

Second set:

1. "Touch of Grey" > (Garcia, Hunter)
2. "Samson and Delilah" (traditional, arranged by Grateful Dead)
3. "High Time" (Garcia, Hunter)

Disc 12

1. "Estimated Prophet" > (Weir, Barlow)
2. "He's Gone" > (Garcia, Hunter)
3. "Drums" > (Hart, Kreutzmann)
4. "Space" > (Garcia, Lesh, Weir)
5. "Throwing Stones" > (Weir, Barlow)
6. "Not Fade Away" > (Charles Hardin, Norman Petty)
7. "Black Peter" > (Garcia, Hunter)
8. "Good Lovin'" (Clark, Resnick)

Encore:

9. "U.S. Blues" (Garcia, Hunter)

=== October 11, 1983 ===
Disc 13

First set:

1. "Wang Dang Doodle" > (Dixon) – 7:49
2. "Jack Straw" (Weir, Hunter) – 5:36
3. "Loser" (Garcia, Hunter) – 7:45
4. "Me and My Uncle" > (Phillips) – 3:16
5. "Mexicali Blues" (Weir, Barlow) – 4:48
6. "Bird Song" (Garcia, Hunter) – 11:58
7. "Hell in a Bucket" > (Weir, Barlow, Mydland) – 5:44
8. "Keep Your Day Job" (Garcia, Hunter) – 4:54

Second set:

9. "China Cat Sunflower" > (Garcia, Hunter) – 6:48
10. "I Know You Rider" (traditional, arranged by Grateful Dead) – 7:21

Disc 14

1. "I Need a Miracle" > (Weir, Barlow) – 5:28
2. "Bertha" > (Garcia, Hunter) – 6:07
3. "Jam" > (Grateful Dead) – 3:36
4. "China Doll" > (Garcia, Hunter) – 8:18
5. "Drums" > (Hart, Kreutzmann) – 12:36
6. "Space" > (Garcia, Lesh, Weir) – 11:12
7. "St. Stephen" > (Garcia, Lesh, Hunter) 6:47
8. "Throwing Stones" > (Weir, Barlow) – 9:28
9. "Touch of Grey" (Garcia, Hunter) – 9:17

Encore:

10. "Johnny B. Goode" (Chuck Berry) – 4:27

=== October 12, 1983 ===
Disc 15

First set:

1. "Cold Rain and Snow" (traditional, arranged by Grateful Dead) – 7:03
2. "All New Minglewood Blues" (traditional, arranged by Grateful Dead) – 9:14
3. "Ramble On Rose" (Garcia, Hunter) – 7:23
4. "My Brother Esau" (Weir, Barlow) – 5:27
5. "It Must Have Been the Roses" (Hunter) – 6:14
6. "Cassidy" > (Weir, Barlow) – 6:17
7. "Cumberland Blues" (Garcia, Lesh, Hunter) – 10:14
8. "Looks Like Rain" > (Weir, Barlow) – 8:39
9. "Might as Well" (Garcia, Hunter) – 4:40

Disc 16

Second set:

1. "Help on the Way" > (Garcia, Hunter) – 3:53
2. "Slipknot!" > (Garcia, Keith Godchaux, Kreutzmann, Lesh, Weir) – 10:05
3. "Franklin's Tower" (Garcia, Hunter) – 14:44
4. "Man Smart (Woman Smarter)" (Span) – 7:40

Disc 17

1. "He's Gone" > (Garcia, Hunter) – 13:12
2. "Drums" > (Hart, Kreutzmann) – 10:19
3. "Space" > (Garcia, Lesh, Weir) – 14:30
4. "Truckin'" > (Garcia, Lesh, Weir, Hunter) – 7:46
5. "Black Peter" > (Garcia, Hunter) – 9:11
6. "Not Fade Away" (Hardin, Petty) – 9:20

Encore:

7. "Revolution" (John Lennon, Paul McCartney) – 5:16

== Personnel ==
Grateful Dead

- Jerry Garcia – guitar, vocals
- Mickey Hart – drums
- Bill Kreutzmann – drums
- Phil Lesh – bass
- Brent Mydland – keyboards, vocals
- Bob Weir – guitar, vocals

Production

- Produced by Grateful Dead
- Produced for release by David Lemieux
- Associate Producer: Ivette Ramos
- Mastering: Jeffrey Norman
- Recording: Dan Healy
- Art direction: Dave Van Patten, Lisa Glines, Doran Tyson
- Original art: Dave Van Patten
- Design: Lisa Glines
- Liner notes: David Fricke

== Charts ==
Chart performance for In and Out of the Garden: Madison Square Garden '81, '82, '83
Chart (2022)	Peak position
US Billboard 200	159
