= Dave's Picks Volume 40 =

Live album by Grateful Dead
- Released: October 29, 2021
- Recorded: July 18–19, 1990
- Venue: Deer Creek Music Center
- Genre: Rock
- Length: 309:26
- Label: Rhino
- Producer: Grateful Dead

Grateful Dead chronology
Listen to the River: St. Louis '71 '72 '73 (2021)	Dave's Picks Volume 40 (2021)	Dave's Picks Volume 41 (2022)

Dave's Picks Volume 40 is a four-CD live album by the rock band the Grateful Dead. It was recorded on July 18 and 19, 1990, at Deer Creek Music Center in Noblesville, Indiana. It was released on October 29, 2021, in a limited edition of 25,000 copies.

Dave's Picks Volume 40 contains all of the songs from both concerts except for the July 19 encore, "U.S. Blues", which was omitted due to lack of space. That song was included as a bonus track on Dave's Picks Volume 41.

The 1990 summer concert tour comprised the last Grateful Dead shows to feature keyboardist and vocalist Brent Mydland, who died of a drug overdose on July 26 of that year.

== Recording and mastering ==
The album was released in HDCD format. This provides enhanced sound quality when played on CD players with HDCD capability, and is fully compatible with regular CD players.

== Critical reception ==
On AllMusic Timothy Monger wrote, "Playing with an acute sense of focus and precision, the Dead charge energetically through usual suspects like the opening combo of "Help on the Way", "Slipknot!", and "Franklin's Tower". There's even more to like about night two, which features an expansive Bob-on-Bob (that's Weir covering Dylan) rendition of "Desolation Row" and a nuanced "Victim or the Crime" into "Foolish Heart"."

== Track listing ==
Disc 1

July 18, 1990 – first set:

1. "Help on the Way" (Jerry Garcia, Robert Hunter) – 4:39
2. "Slipknot!" (Garcia, Keith Godchaux, Bill Kreutzmann, Phil Lesh, Bob Weir) – 4:16
3. "Franklin's Tower" (Garcia, Kreutzmann, Hunter) – 9:34
4. "New Minglewood Blues" (traditional, arranged by Grateful Dead) – 7:36
5. "Easy to Love You" (Brent Mydland, John Perry Barlow) – 5:44
6. "Peggy-O" (traditional, arranged by Grateful Dead) – 6:38
7. "When I Paint My Masterpiece" (Bob Dylan) – 5:37
8. "Brown-Eyed Women" (Garcia, Hunter) – 6:50
9. "Cassidy" (Weir, Barlow) – 7:00
10. "Deal" (Garcia, Hunter) – 8:21

July 18, 1990 – second set:

11. "China Cat Sunflower" (Garcia, Hunter) – 7:34
12. "I Know You Rider" (traditional, arranged by Grateful Dead) – 6:01

Disc 2

1. "Looks Like Rain" (Weir, Barlow) – 8:26
2. "Terrapin Station" (Garcia, Hunter) – 15:27
3. "Jam" (Grateful Dead) – 4:33
4. "Drums" (Mickey Hart, Kreutzmann) – 6:10
5. "Space" (Garcia, Lesh, Weir) – 8:22
6. "The Other One" (Weir, Kreutzmann) – 12:17
7. "Morning Dew" (Bonnie Dobson, Tim Rose) – 12:41

July 18, 1990 – encore:

8. "The Weight" (Robbie Robertson) – 6:22

Disc 3

July 19, 1990 – first set:

1. "Jack Straw" (Weir, Hunter) – 6:42
2. "They Love Each Other" (Garcia, Hunter) – 7:47
3. "Desolation Row" (Dylan) – 12:17
4. "Row Jimmy" (Garcia, Hunter) – 10:54
5. "Picasso Moon" (Weir, Barlow, Bob Bralove) – 8:10
6. "Althea" (Garcia, Hunter) – 7:22
7. "Promised Land" (Chuck Berry) – 5:05

July 19, 1990 – second set:

8. "Victim or the Crime" (Weir, Gerrit Graham) – 8:19
9. "Foolish Heart" (Garcia, Hunter) – 9:15

Disc 4

1. "Playing in the Band" (Weir, Hart, Hunter) – 9:42
2. "China Doll" (Garcia, Hunter) – 5:29
3. "Uncle John's Band" (Garcia, Hunter) – 9:15
4. "Drums" (Hart, Kreutzmann) – 12:17
5. "Space" (Garcia, Lesh, Weir) – 12:44
6. "All Along the Watchtower" (Dylan) – 7:58
7. "Black Peter" (Garcia, Hunter) – 9:06
8. "Not Fade Away" (Norman Petty, Charles Hardin) – 12:53

== Personnel ==
Grateful Dead

- Jerry Garcia – guitar, vocals
- Mickey Hart – drums
- Bill Kreutzmann – drums
- Phil Lesh – bass, vocals
- Brent Mydland – keyboards, vocals
- Bob Weir – guitar, vocals

Production

- Produced by Grateful Dead
- Produced for release by David Lemieux
- Executive producer: Mark Pinkus
- Associate producers: Doran Tyson, Ivette Ramos
- Mastering: Jeffrey Norman
- Recording: Dan Healy
- Additional recording: David Lemieux
- Tape research: Michael Wesley Johnson
- Archival research: Luisa Haddad
- Art direction, design: Steve Vance
- Cover art: Helen Rebecchi Kennedy
- Photos: Robbi Cohn
- Liner notes essay: David Lemieux

== Charts ==
Chart performance for Dave's Picks Volume 40
Chart (2021)	Peak position
US Billboard 200	13
US Top Rock Albums (Billboard)	1
