= Dave's Picks Volume 46 =

Live album by Grateful Dead
- Released: April 28, 2023
- Recorded: September 9, 1972
- Venue: Hollywood Palladium; Los Angeles, CA
- Genre: Rock
- Length: 202:36 (Bonus disc 76:25)
- Label: Rhino
- Producer: Grateful Dead; David Lemieux

Grateful Dead chronology
Dave's Picks Volume 45 (2023)	Dave's Picks Volume 46 (2023)	Here Comes Sunshine 1973 (2023)

Alternative cover
- Dave's Picks Bonus Disc 2023

Dave's Picks Volume 46 is a three-CD live album by American rock band the Grateful Dead. The album contains the complete show recorded on September 9, 1972, at the Hollywood Palladium in Los Angeles, California. It was released on April 28, 2023, in a limited edition of 25,000 copies.

Some copies of the album include a bonus disc with songs recorded on September 3, 1972, at Folsom Field in Boulder, Colorado and on September 19, 1972, at Roosevelt Stadium in Jersey City, New Jersey. Several other songs from the September 3 show were included as bonus tracks on Dick's Picks Volume 36.

== Critical reception ==
On AllMusic Timothy Monger said, "Heading down the coast to Los Angeles for a September show, the band builds on some of the songs and combos they'd worked out earlier that year on the famous Europe '72 tour.... There are solo cuts from Jerry Garcia and Bob Weir, a lengthy and very psychedelic "The Other One", and a classic closing suite of "Casey Jones" / "Sugar Magnolia" / "One More Saturday Night"."

== Track listing ==
Disc one

First set, part one:

1. "Promised Land" (Chuck Berry) – 3:55
2. "Sugaree" (Jerry Garcia, Robert Hunter) – 7:10
3. "Me and My Uncle" (John Phillips) – 3:46
4. "Bird Song" (Garcia, Hunter) – 11:56
5. "Black-Throated Wind" (Bob Weir, John Perry Barlow) – 6:54
6. "Tennessee Jed" (Garcia, Hunter) – 7:57
7. "Mexicali Blues" (Weir, Barlow) – 4:04
8. "Deal" (Garcia, Hunter) – 4:50

Disc two

First set, part two:

1. "Playing in the Band" (Weir, Mickey Hart, Hunter) – 19:15
2. "Loser" (Garcia, Hunter) – 7:15
3. "Johnny B. Goode" (Berry) – 4:07

Second set, part one:

4. "China Cat Sunflower" (Garcia, Hunter) – 7:39 →
5. "I Know You Rider" (traditional, arranged by Grateful Dead) – 6:13
6. "Friend of the Devil" (Garcia, Hunter, John Dawson) – 4:35
7. "Jack Straw" (Weir, Hunter) – 4:53

Second set, part three:

8. "Casey Jones" (Garcia, Hunter) – 7:40
9. "Sugar Magnolia" (Weir, Hunter) – 8:39

Encore:

10. "One More Saturday Night" (Weir) – 7:13

Disc three

Second set, part two:

1. "He's Gone" (Garcia, Hunter) – 11:14 →
2. "Truckin'" (Garcia, Weir, Phil Lesh, Hunter) – 14:00 →
3. "Drums" (Bill Kreutzmann) – 2:38 →
4. "The Other One" (Weir, Kreutzmann) – 34:46
5. "Stella Blue" (Garcia, Hunter) – 7:20
6. "El Paso" (Marty Robbins) – 4:44

Dave's Picks Bonus Disc 2023

September 19, 1972 – Roosevelt Stadium, Jersey City, New Jersey:

1. "Bertha" (Garcia, Hunter) – 6:24 →
2. "Greatest Story Ever Told" (Weir, Hart, Hunter) – 5:33
3. "Bird Song" (Garcia, Hunter) – 11:01
4. "Mississippi Half-Step Uptown Toodeloo" (Garcia, Hunter) – 7:03
5. "Brokedown Palace" (Garcia, Hunter) – 5:45

September 3, 1972 – Folsom Field, Boulder, Colorado:

6. "China Cat Sunflower" (Garcia, Hunter) – 6:43 →
7. "I Know You Rider" (traditional, arranged by Grateful Dead) – 5:59
8. "Brown-Eyed Women" (Garcia, Hunter) – 5:26
9. "Truckin'" (Garcia, Weir, Lesh, Hunter) – 10:42
10. "Cold Rain and Snow" (traditional, arranged by Grateful Dead) – 5:30
11. "Ramble On Rose" (Garcia, Hunter) – 6:17

== Personnel ==
Grateful Dead

- Jerry Garcia – lead guitar, vocals
- Bob Weir – rhythm guitar, vocals
- Phil Lesh – bass guitar, vocals
- Bill Kreutzmann – drums
- Keith Godchaux – keyboards
- Donna Jean Godchaux – vocals

Production

- Produced by Grateful Dead
- Produced for release by David Lemieux
- Executive producer: Mark Pinkus
- Associate producers: Doran Tyson, Ivette Ramos
- Mastering: Jeffrey Norman
- Recording: Owsley Stanley
- Art direction, design: Steve Vance
- Cover art: John Vogl
- Liner notes essay: David Lemieux

== Charts ==
Chart performance for Dave's Picks Volume 46
Chart (2023)	Peak position
US Billboard 200	28
US Top Rock Albums (Billboard)	3
