= Dave's Picks Volume 44 =

Live album by Grateful Dead
- Released: October 28, 2022
- Recorded: June 23, 1990
- Venues: Autzen Stadium; Eugene, Oregon
- Genre: Rock
- Length: 169:01
- Label: Rhino
- Producer: Grateful Dead

Grateful Dead chronology
Madison Square Garden, New York, NY 3/9/81 (2022)	Dave's Picks Volume 44 (2022)	Dave's Picks Volume 45 (2023)

Dave's Picks Volume 44 is a three-CD live album by the rock band the Grateful Dead. It contains the complete concert recorded at Autzen Stadium in Eugene, Oregon on June 23, 1990. Also included is a performance of "Cold Rain and Snow" from the band's December 26, 1969 concert, which was omitted from the previous Dave's Picks release due to lack of space. It was released on October 28, 2022, in a limited edition of 25,000 copies.

This concert was the first of a two-night stand in Eugene. The opening act for both shows was Little Feat.

== Critical reception ==
On AllMusic, Timothy Monger said, "From an archival standpoint, it's notable for a number of reasons. A rare day show with gates opening at noon, there's a loose and lazy feel to this nearly three-hour concert – one of the longest of any era – which features some sterling contributions from keyboardist/singer Brent Mydland..."

== Track listing ==
Disc 1

First set:

1. "Feel Like a Stranger" (Bob Weir, John Perry Barlow) – 9:06
2. "West L.A. Fadeaway" (Jerry Garcia, Robert Hunter) – 8:38
3. "Me and My Uncle" (John Phillips) – 2:22 →
4. "Cumberland Blues" (Garcia, Phil Lesh, Hunter) – 6:41
5. "Far from Me" (Brent Mydland) – 5:30
6. "They Love Each Other" (Garcia, Hunter) – 7:43
7. "Cassidy" (Weir, Barlow) – 7:05
8. "Tennessee Jed" (Garcia, Hunter) – 8:20 →
9. "Promised Land" (Chuck Berry) – 5:06

Disc 2

Second set:

1. "Eyes of the World" (Garcia, Hunter) – 15:35 →
2. "Looks Like Rain" (Weir, Barlow) – 8:54 →
3. "Crazy Fingers" (Garcia, Hunter) – 8:23 →
4. "Playing in the Band" (Weir, Mickey Hart, Hunter) – 10:56 →
5. "Uncle John's Band" (Garcia, Hunter) – 9:21 →
6. "Playing in the Band" (Weir, Hart, Hunter) – 2:21 →
7. "Drums" (Hart, Bill Kreutzmann) – 8:24 →

Disc 3

Second set, continued:

1. "Space" (Garcia, Lesh, Weir) – 9:47 →
2. "The Wheel" (Garcia, Kreutzmann, Hunter) – 5:46 →
3. "I Need a Miracle" (Weir, Barlow) – 5:25 →
4. "Morning Dew" (Bonnie Dobson, Tim Rose) – 12:06

Encore:

5. "One More Saturday Night" (Weir) – 6:13

December 26, 1969 – McFarlin Auditorium, Dallas, TX:

6. "Cold Rain and Snow" (traditional, arranged by Grateful Dead) – 5:14

== Personnel ==
Grateful Dead

- Jerry Garcia – lead guitar, vocals
- Bob Weir – rhythm guitar, vocals
- Phil Lesh – bass, vocals
- Bill Kreutzmann – drums, percussion
- Mickey Hart – drums, percussion
- Brent Mydland – keyboards, vocals (except "Cold Rain and Snow")
- Ron "Pigpen" McKernan – percussion, vocals ("Cold Rain and Snow" only)
- Tom Constanten – keyboards ("Cold Rain and Snow" only)

Production

- Produced by Grateful Dead
- Produced for release by David Lemieux
- Mastering: Jeffrey Norman
- Recording: Dan Healy
- Art direction, design: Steve Vance
- Cover art: Matt J. Adams
- Photos: Robbi Cohn
- Additional recording, liner notes essay: David Lemieux

== Charts ==
Chart performance for Dave's Picks Volume 44
Chart (2022)	Peak position
US Billboard 200	13
US Top Rock Albums (Billboard)	3
