= Fox Theatre, St. Louis, MO 12-10-71 =

Live album by Grateful Dead
- Released: October 1, 2021
- Recorded: December 10, 1971
- Venue: Fox Theatre
- Genre: Psychedelic rock
- Length: 183:37
- Label: Rhino
- Producer: Grateful Dead

Grateful Dead chronology
Dave's Picks Volume 39 (2021)	Fox Theatre, St. Louis, MO 12-10-71 (2021)	Listen to the River: St. Louis '71 '72 '73 (2021)

Fox Theatre, St. Louis, MO 12-10-71 is a live album by the Grateful Dead. As the title suggests, it was recorded at the Fox Theatre in St. Louis, Missouri on December 10, 1971. It was released as a three-disc CD and digitally on October 1, 2021, and as a five-disc LP on November 19, 2021.

The same recording was released on October 8, 2021, as part of the seven-concert, 20-CD box set Listen to the River: St. Louis '71 '72 '73.

At the December 10, 1971 concert, and at the other shows on this tour, the opening act was the New Riders of the Purple Sage.

== Track listing ==
Disc 1

First set:

1. "Bertha" (Jerry Garcia, Robert Hunter) – 6:32
2. "Me and My Uncle" (John Phillips) – 3:48
3. "Mr. Charlie" (Ron McKernan, Hunter) – 4:25
4. "Loser" (Garcia, Hunter) – 7:22
5. "Beat It On Down the Line" (Jesse Fuller) – 3:49
6. "Sugaree" (Garcia, Hunter) – 8:49
7. "Jack Straw" (Bob Weir, Hunter) – 5:30
8. "Next Time You See Me" (Bill Harvey, Earl Forest) – 4:37
9. "Tennessee Jed" (Garcia, Hunter) – 7:43
10. "El Paso" (Marty Robbins) – 4:56
11. "Big Railroad Blues" (Noah Lewis, arranged by Grateful Dead) – 4:12
12. "Casey Jones" (Garcia, Hunter) – 5:42

Disc 2

Second set:

1. "Good Lovin'" (Rudy Clark, Arthur Resnick) – 22:12
2. "Brokedown Palace" (Garcia, Hunter) – 6:06
3. "Playing in the Band" (Weir, Mickey Hart, Hunter) – 6:57
4. "Run Rudolph Run" (Johnny Marks, Marvin Brodie, Chuck Berry) – 3:39
5. "Deal" (Garcia, Hunter) – 5:50
6. "Sugar Magnolia" (Weir, Hunter) – 7:54
7. "Comes a Time" (Garcia, Hunter) – 8:41

Disc 3

1. "Truckin'" (Garcia, Phil Lesh, Weir, Hunter) – 8:09
2. "Drums" (Bill Kreutzmann) – 3:21
3. "The Other One" (Weir, Kreutzmann) – 13:13
4. "Sittin' On Top of the World" (Lonnie Carter, Walter Jacobs) – 3:10
5. "The Other One" (Weir, Kreutzmann) – 6:02
6. "Not Fade Away" (Norman Petty, Charles Hardin) – 5:58
7. "Goin' Down the Road Feeling Bad" (traditional, arranged by Grateful Dead) – 6:13
8. "Not Fade Away" (Petty, Hardin) – 3:59

Encore:

9. "One More Saturday Night" (Weir) – 4:52

== Personnel ==
Grateful Dead

- Jerry Garcia – guitar, vocals
- Keith Godchaux – keyboards
- Bill Kreutzmann – drums
- Phil Lesh – bass, vocals
- Ron "Pigpen" McKernan – keyboards, harmonica, vocals
- Bob Weir – guitar, vocals

Production

- Produced by Grateful Dead
- Produced for release by David Lemieux
- Mastering: Jeffrey Norman
- Recording: Rex Jackson
- Tape restoration and speed correction: Jamie Howarth, John Chester
- Art direction: Rory Wilson, Liane Plant
- Original art: Liane Plant
- Package design: Rory Wilson
- Photos: Bob Marks
- Liner notes: Nicholas G. Meriwether

== Charts ==
Chart performance for Fox Theatre, St. Louis, MO 12-10-71
Chart (2021)	Peak position
Hungarian Albums (MAHASZ)	8
