= Bob Coltman =

American singer-songwriter

Bob Coltman (born November 17, 1937, New Rochelle, New York, United States) is an American singer of traditional songs, songwriter, guitarist and banjoist, and author.

Coltman is the author of the detailed scholarly biography, Paul Clayton and the Folksong Revival (Scarecrow Press (2008); ISBN 978-0- 8108-6132-9; 320 pp;) and Across the Chasm: How the Depression Changed Country Music, Old Time Music 23 (Winter 1976- 1977).

He became a performer in his early teens, playing 5-string banjo, guitar and other instruments. In 1954 and 1955 he traveled in Virginia, North Carolina, Tennessee and Kentucky, meeting traditional singers and collecting songs. During his undergraduate years at Dartmouth College (1956–59) Coltman performed frequently in campus hootenannies. In 1959 Bob traveled in the US west, southwest, and Mexico with skier-climber-singer Bill Briggs, influencing a number of singers who would take part in the folk song revival of the 1960s.

While in Baltimore in 1962, Coltman accompanied country, blues and jazz singer Joe Bussard. A vivid account of one of their record-finding trips appears in Marshall Wyatt, “A Visit with Joseph E. Bussard, Jr." Old-Time Herald. He recorded 78 rpm solo and group singles under his own name and a variety of pseudonyms (Danville Dan, Georgia Jokers, Bald Knob Chicken Snatchers, etc.) for Bussard’s Fonotone Records label. From these masters were later made two LP albums and portions of a CD compilation.

== Discography ==
- Jolly Joe and His Jug Band
- The West Maryland Highballers
- Lonesome Robin
- Before They Close The Minstrel Show
- Son of Child
- Fox Hollow Folk Festival LP compilation, You Got Magic (Biograph 1975)
- Art Is the Handmaid of Human Good, RRRecords
- The Lowell Plan, RRRecords
- Dust-to-Digital 2005, Fonotone Records (2005)

== Songwriter ==
He was the first to arrange and popularize “I Know You Rider,” which went on to become a folk and rock standard. College concerts, coffeehouse, folk festival and other appearances in the US northeast and Middle Atlantic states led to Coltman’s three solo LPs issued on the Minstrel label. He is credited with developing unique guitar and banjo styles influential within the folksong revival, and has appeared as sideman on recordings by Ed Trickett, Bob Zentz, and Joe Hickerson.

As a songwriter in the traditional mold, Coltman is credited with a number of contemporary folk standards including “Web of Birdsong (If You Will Weave Me),” “Death of John Kennedy,” “Lonesome Robin,” “Before They Close the Minstrel Show,” and the widely praised Christmas song “Make My Present Small.”

== See also ==
- Robert Coltman
- Bill Briggs
- Joe Bussard
- "I Know You Rider"
- RRRecords
