= Hollywood Palladium =

Theater in Los Angeles, California, US

- The Palladium
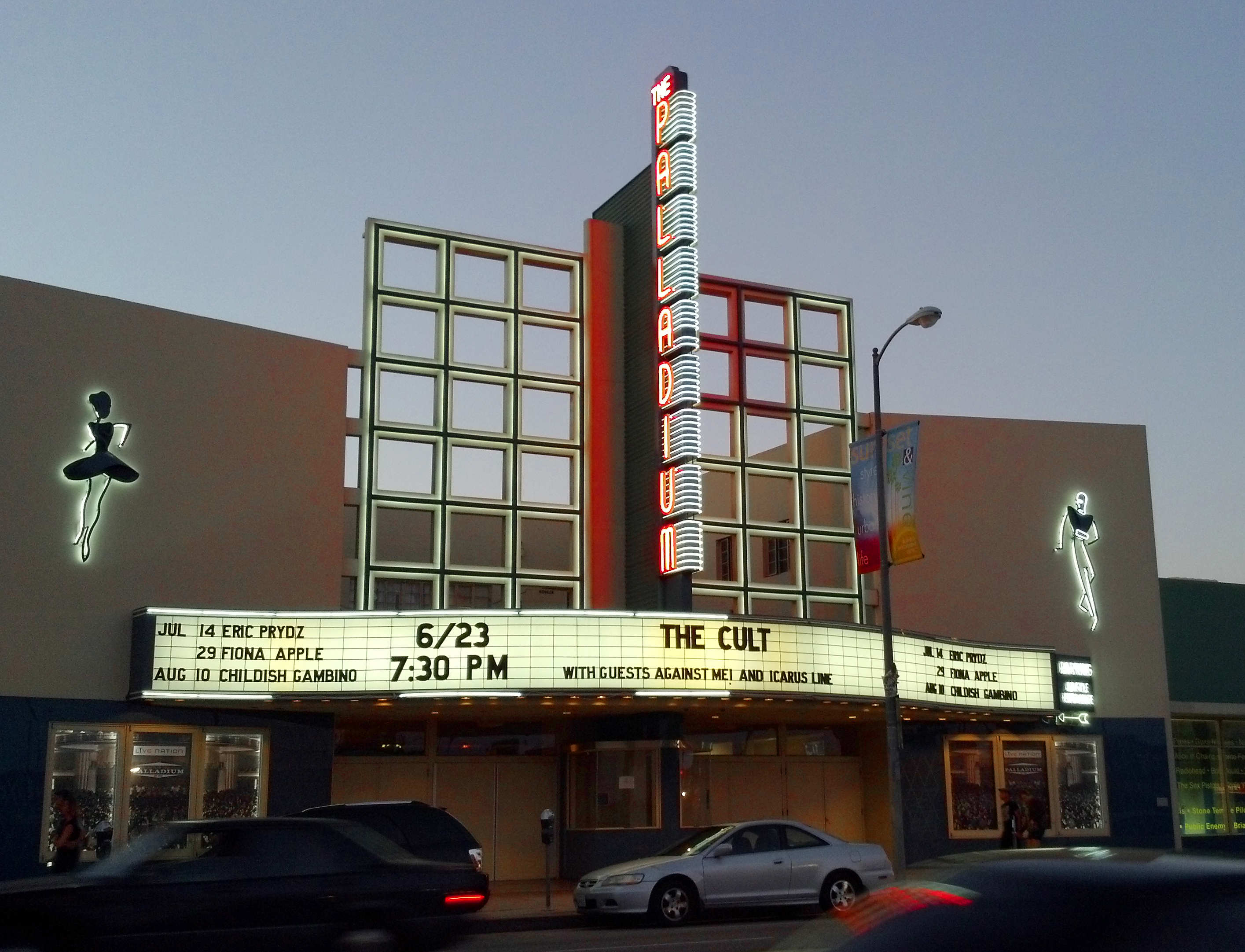
- The Hollywood Palladium in June 2012, following its renovation

- Location within the Los Angeles metropolitan area Location within California Location within the United States
- Address: 6215 Sunset Boulevard; Hollywood, California; 90028
- Coordinates: 34.098007°N 118.32421°W
- Owner: Palladium Investors Ltd.
- Operator: Live Nation
- Seating type: Standing room only, dance floor
- Capacity: 4,000
- Type: Concert hall
- Events: Big band, rock and roll, pop music
- Public transit: Hollywood/Vine

Construction
- Groundbreaking: June 10, 1940
- Built: 1940
- Opened: October 31, 1940
- Renovated: 2007–2008

Website
- livenation.com

The Hollywood Palladium is a theater located at 6215 Sunset Boulevard in the Hollywood neighborhood of Los Angeles, California, United States. It was built in a Streamline Moderne, Art Deco style and includes an 11,200-square-foot (1,040 m^{2}) dance floor including a mezzanine and a floor level with room for up to 4,000 people. The theater was listed on the National Register of Historic Places in 2016. The Palladium was designated Los Angeles Historic Cultural Monument No. 1130 on September 28, 2016.

== History ==
Los Angeles Times publisher Norman Chandler funded the construction of the art deco Hollywood Palladium at a cost of $1.6 million in 1940. It was built where the original Paramount lot once stood between Argyle and El Centro avenues, and was operated by film producer Maurice Cohen. The dance hall was designed by Gordon Kaufmann, architect of the Greystone Mansion, the Los Angeles Times Building and the Santa Anita Racetrack in Arcadia. He was also the architect for the Hoover Dam and early Caltech dorms.

The ballroom opened on October 31, 1940 with a dance featuring Tommy Dorsey and his Orchestra and band vocalist Frank Sinatra. It had six bars serving liquor and two more serving soft drinks and a $1 cover charge and a $3 charge for dinner.

During World War II, the Palladium hosted radio broadcasts featuring Betty Grable greeting servicemens' song requests. Big Band acts began losing popularity in the 1950s, causing the Palladium to hold charity balls, political events, auto shows, and rock concerts. In 1961, it became the home of the long-running Lawrence Welk Show.

From 1955 to 1976, the venue was the scene of Latin Music Orchestras for ragers sponsored by radio personality Chico Sesma titled Latin Holidays, featuring childhood friend Ray Vasquez Recording Artist, Lead Vocalist and Trombonist. The Tito Puente Orchestra performed regularly between 1957–1977 to sold-out houses of 5000.

President John F. Kennedy attended a dinner given in his honor by the California Democratic Party at the Palladium on November 18, 1961.

In 1964, it was announced that none of the jazz bands scheduled were to be paid and a riot ensued after the show was cancelled.

The Joe Loco Orchestra and show performed on the March 1965 Latin Holiday with singer/dancer Josephine "Josie" Powell.

Pop Expo '69, referred to as a "teenage fair," was a youth-oriented event held from 28 March to 6 April 1969 at the Palladium, and included performances by The Jimi Hendrix Experience and the MC5.

The Grateful Dead played at the Palladium four times - twice in August 1971, with the New Riders Of The Purple Sage also on the bill, and twice in September 1972, with the September 9 show being released on Dave's Picks Volume 46.

In 1973, Stevie Wonder performed with Taj Mahal in what was advertised as an "Afrocentric concert" to benefit African refugees.

Beginning in the 1980s and 1990s, punk rock, rap and heavy metal concerts started to be booked at the venue. Several violent disturbances resulted, eventually leading to the Palladium closing for eight weeks, starting in February 1993.

Since 1985, the theater has been owned by Palladium Investors Ltd., a privately held group. Curfews were implemented in 1993 and a show by Marky Mark and the Funky Bunch was called off because of a brawl that occurred a few nights earlier. It was also used for Hollywood celebrity parties.

== Renovation and reopening ==
In 2007, the owners agreed to a long-term lease to operate, manage and exclusively book the Hollywood Palladium with Live Nation, a Los Angeles-based company.

The Palladium reopened with a Jay-Z concert on October 15, 2008, after a year-long, multimillion-dollar renovation by Live Nation. The renovation included an overhaul of the venue's interior and exterior, a new dance floor, expanded concessions, upgraded restrooms and improvements to the stage infrastructure. Jay-Z performed for nearly an hour-and-half, backed by an eight-piece band and DJ AM, who played his first show after surviving a plane crash in South Carolina. The Hollywood Palladium was also used as the memorial service site for DJ AM on September 3, 2009.

For the 2008–2009 season, a yearlong table for four cost $30,000.

=== Residential expansion ===
The Los Angeles City Council approved an expansion of the Palladium property parking lot in March 2016. The plan consists of two 28-story residential towers that surrounds the Palladium, standing 350 feet (110 m) tall and creating 731 condominiums, 24,000-square-foot (2,200 m^{2}) of store-front retail space, and a below grade-parking garage. The Towers were designed by Stanley Saitowits of Natoma Architects for developer Crescent Heights. The L-shaped design resembles and echoes the design of the Palladium.

The local AIDS Healthcare Foundation (AHF) filed a lawsuit in 2016 citing over development and improper approval process. One of many local lawsuits filed by AHF president Michael Weinstein. In August 2018, the district court ruled all steps were taken during EIR/DEIR. The AHF filed an appeal. The AHF lost the appeal in November 2019 and Crescent Heights plans to proceed.

== Gallery ==
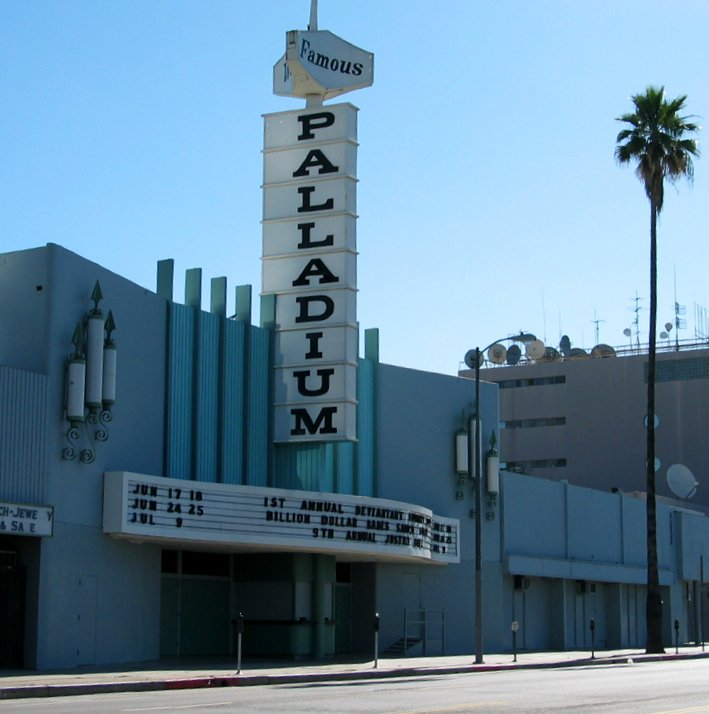
The Palladium in 2005, prior to its 2008 renovation

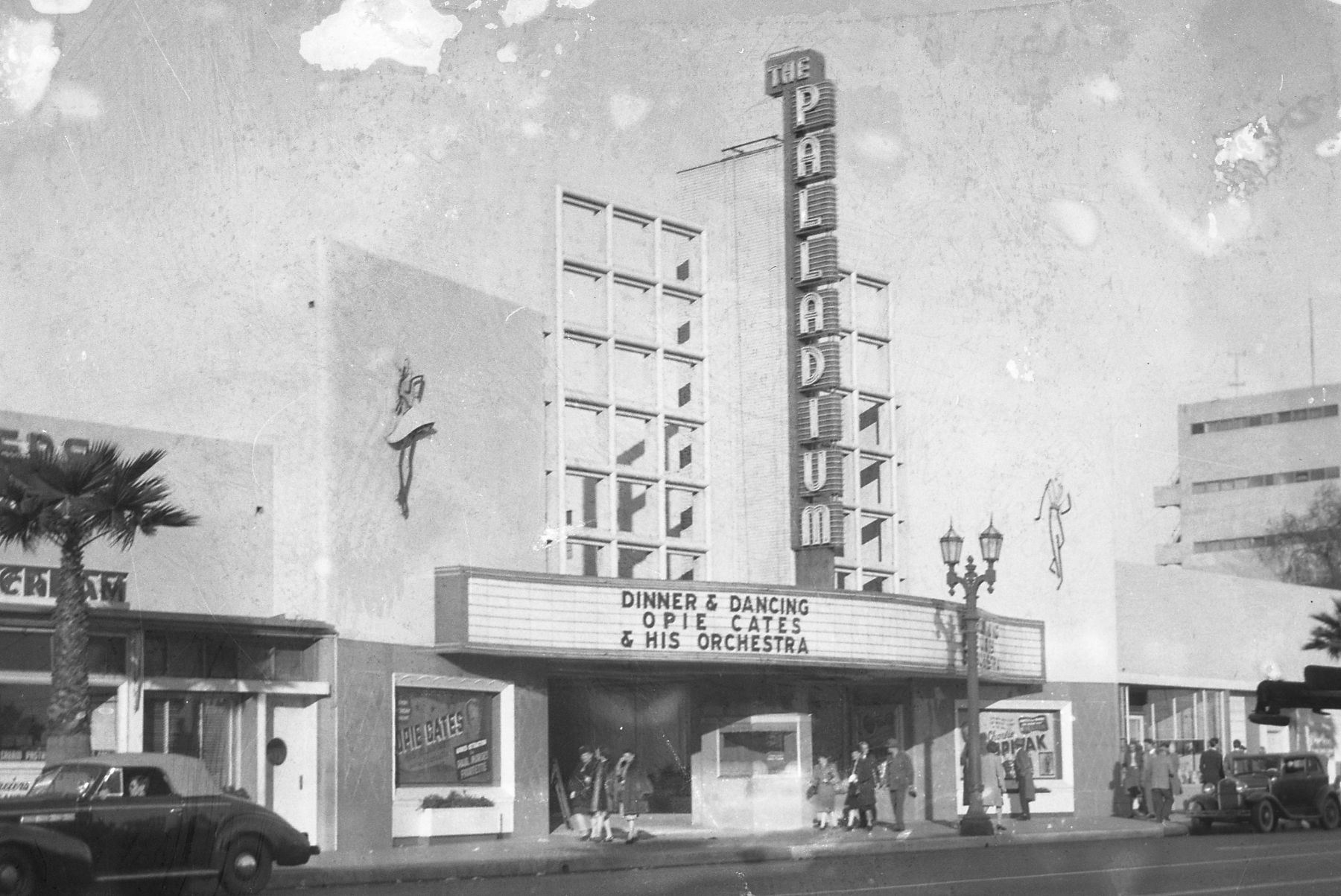
Bandleader Opie Cates was on the bill in 1947.

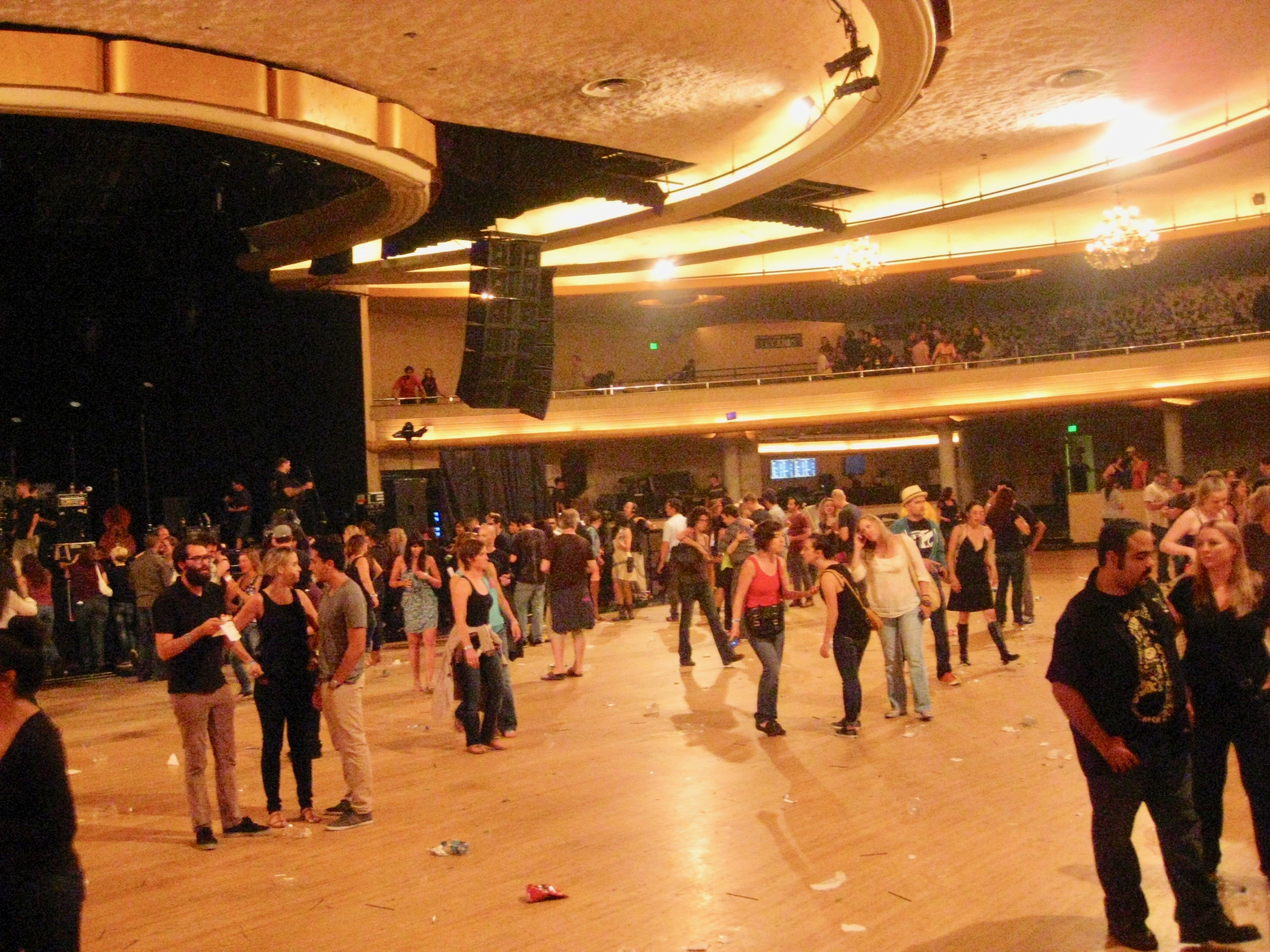
Inside the Palladium in 2012, following its renovation

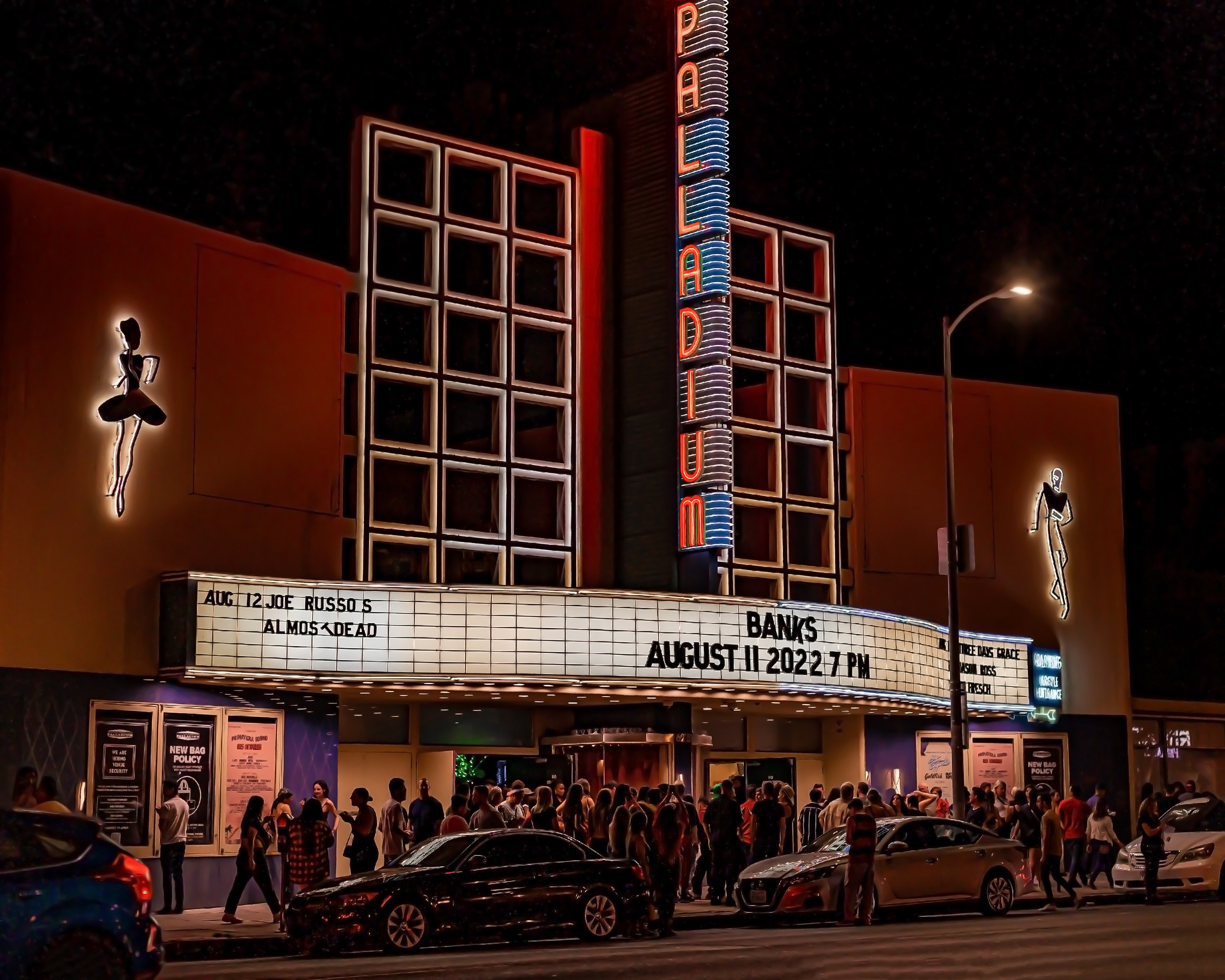
The Palladium as seen in 2022

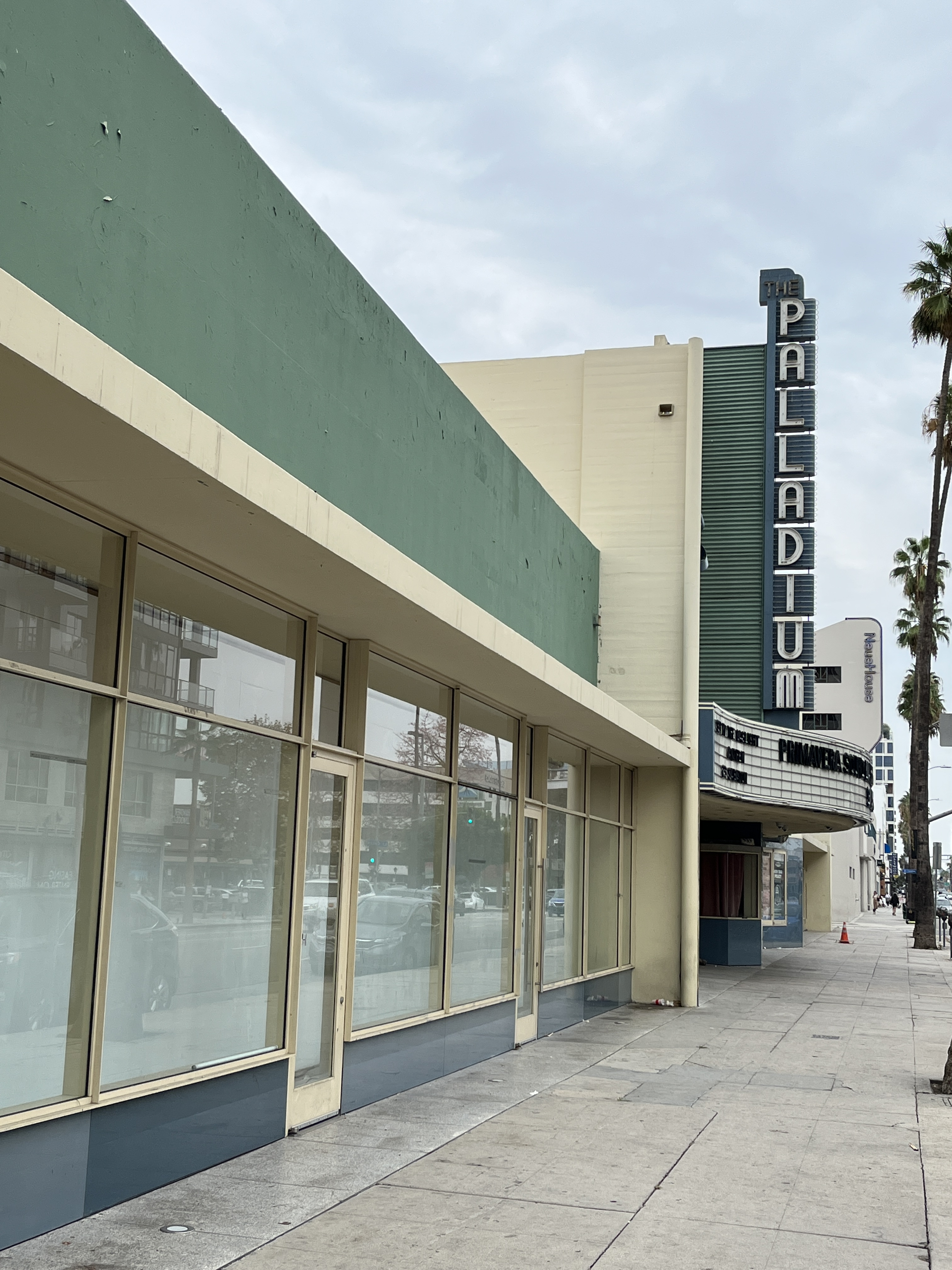
Side view of the Palladium in 2022

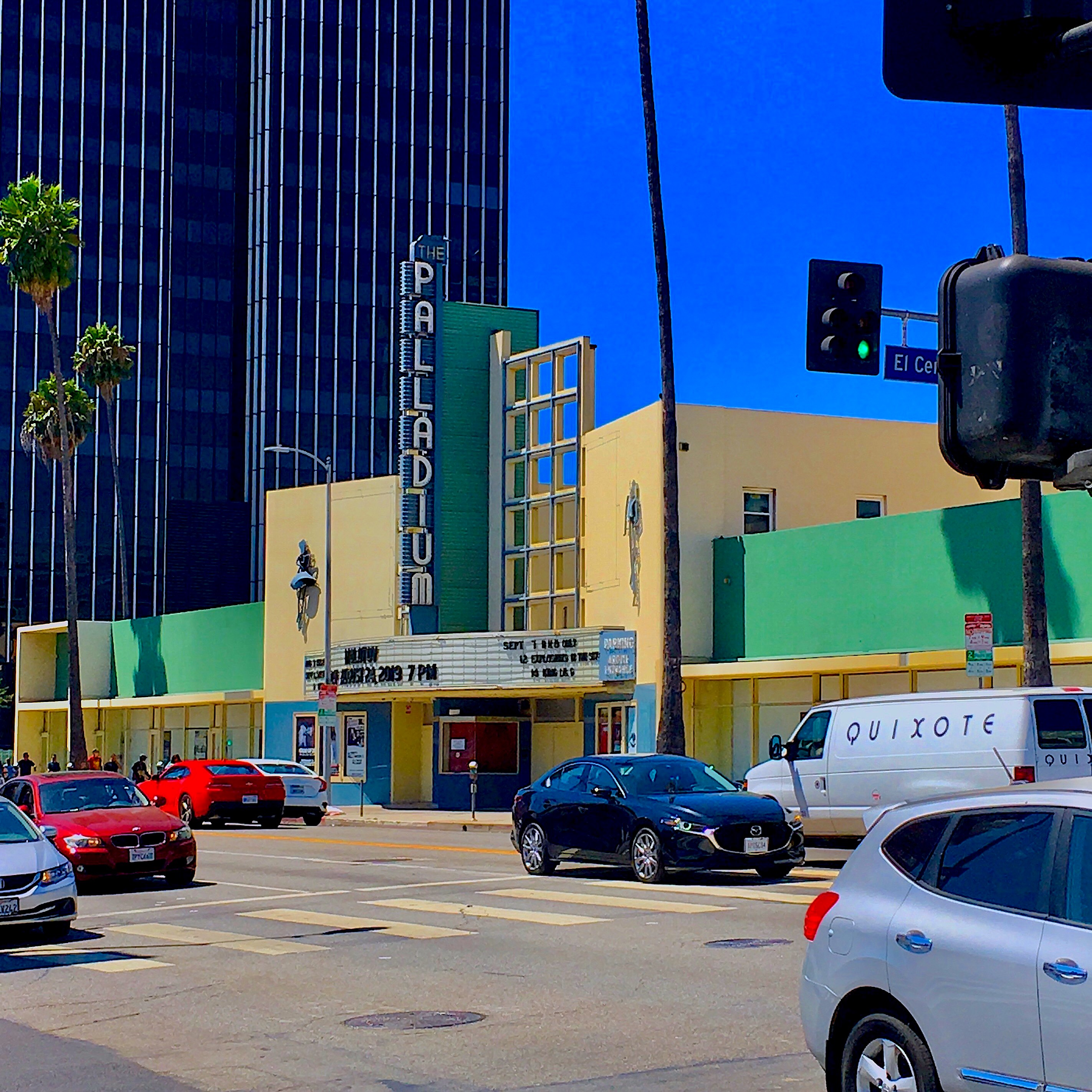
View from across the street in 2019

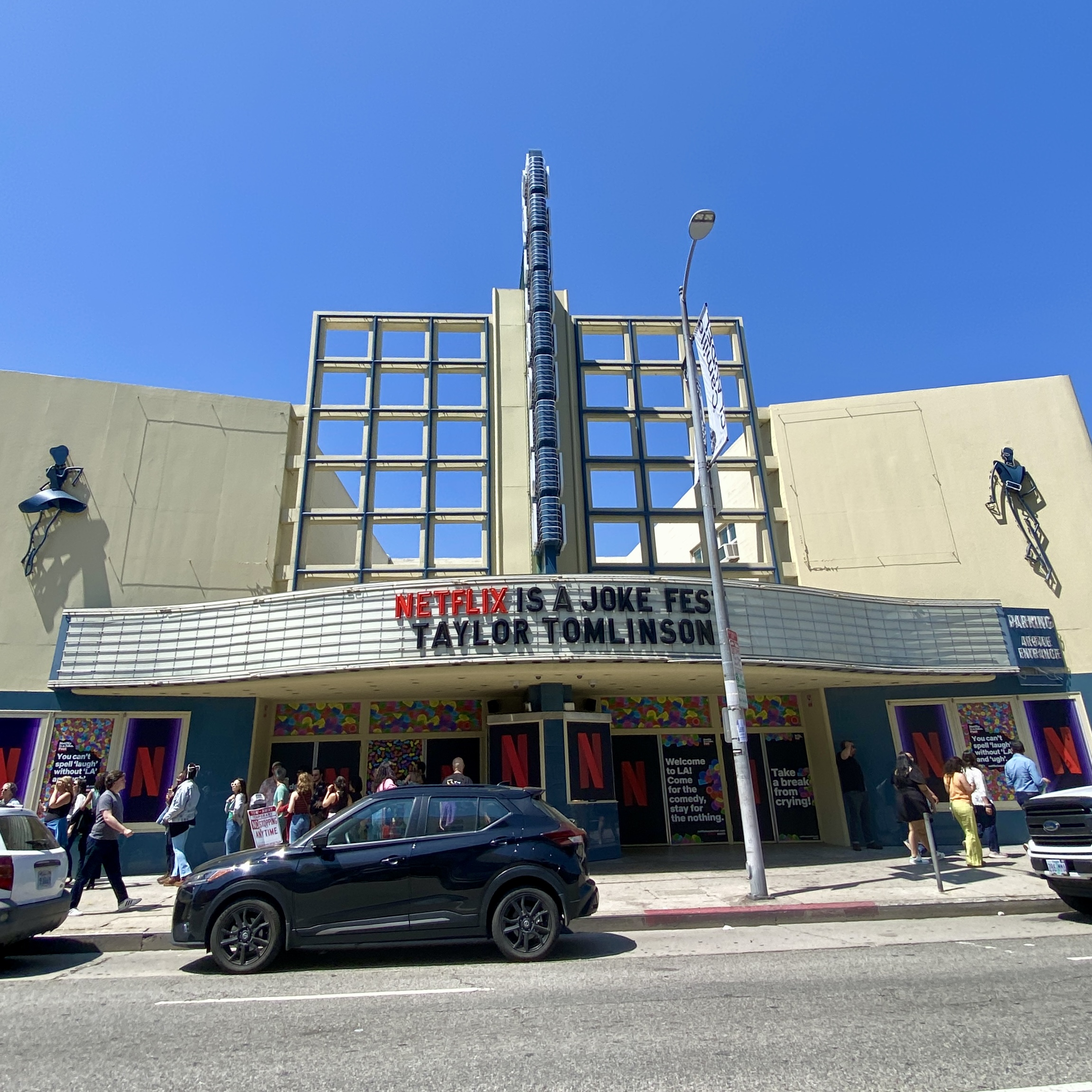
Marque prior to Taylor Tomlinson show

== In popular culture ==
The Hollywood Palladium has been featured in many films and television productions over the years:

- The Hollywood Palladium exterior, with its iconic Art Deco façade, served as the fictional sound stage for Aaron Sorkin's 2006-2007 ensemble television drama Studio 60 On The Sunset Strip.
- The Day of the Locust (1975).
- The last scene of the series finale of Adam-12 was filmed at the Palladium in 1975. Officer Jim Reed, played by Kent McCord received the Los Angeles Police Department Medal of Valor for saving Officer Pete Malloy, played by Martin Milner.
- Warren Zevon's self titled 1976 album features the singer-songwriter on the cover in the Palladium's parking lot, photographed on the same night as the 18th Annual Grammy Awards.
- Skatetown, U.S.A. (1979).
- The final concert scene in The Blues Brothers depicted as "Palace Hotel Ballroom". The exterior was actually the South Shore Country Club in Chicago. (1980).
- Richard Pryor performed two dates in December 1981 and was filmed for the theatrical release Richard Pryor: Live on the Sunset Strip in March 1982.
- The A-Team, season 4, episode 6 "The Heart of Rock N' Roll" shows the theater being used for concerts by Rick James and Isaac Hayes (character C.J. Mack).
- Keith Richards released a CD and DVD of his solo concert Live at the Hollywood Palladium, December 15, 1988.
- The punk band Bad Religion recorded Live at the Palladium in 2006, a collection from their two days of performances.
- Thrash metal bands Megadeth and Testament have both produced live recordings at the Palladium, Megadeth recording a live version of their album Rust in Peace and Testament recording Return to the Apocalyptic City.
- Luna Sea performed their first American concert at the Palladium on December 4, 2010. It was recorded in 3D and released as both a live album and concert film, Luna Sea 3D in Los Angeles.
- In 2016, Dave Chappelle filmed a Netflix special at the Palladium.
- On July 18, 1971, the jazz label, CTI Records, staged a concert featuring the CTI All-Stars at the Palladium. Performing were Freddie Hubbard, Hubert Laws, Stanley Turrentine, George Benson, Hank Crawford, Johnny Hammond, Ron Carter, Billy Cobham and Airto Moreira. It was released as a double LP in 1972 titled California Concert.

== See also ==
- List of music venues in Los Angeles
- National Register of Historic Places listings in Los Angeles
- List of theatres in California
- House of Blues
