= Dave's Picks Volume 45 =

Live album by Grateful Dead
- Released: January 27, 2023
- Recorded: October 1–2, 1977
- Venue: Paramount Theatre; Portland, Oregon
- Genre: Rock
- Length: 299:58
- Label: Rhino
- Producer: Grateful Dead

Grateful Dead chronology
Dave's Picks Volume 44 (2022)	Dave's Picks Volume 45 (2023)	Dave's Picks Volume 46 (2023)

Dave's Picks Volume 45 is a four-CD live album by the rock band the Grateful Dead. It contains two complete concerts recorded on October 1 and 2, 1977 at the Paramount Theatre in Portland, Oregon. It was released on January 27, 2023, in a limited edition of 25,000 copies.

The album is one of many Grateful Dead live releases to feature performances from 1977, widely considered a peak year for the band. Material from the band's October 1977 shows was previously documented on Road Trips Volume 1 Number 2.

== Critical reception ==
On AllMusic Timothy Monger wrote, "Pristinely recorded by soundboard mainstay Betty Cantor-Jackson at the Paramount Theatre, Dave's Picks 45 comprises both concerts in their entirety as the Dead cook through classic combos of the era in fine form. They even drag out a few oldies, playing their first "Dupree's Diamond Blues" since 1969 and re-introducing the eternal "Casey Jones" back into the canon after a three-year absence."

== Track listing ==
Disc 1

October 1 – first set:

1. "Promised Land" (Chuck Berry) – 4:26
2. "They Love Each Other" (Jerry Garcia, Robert Hunter) – 7:50
3. "Mexicali Blues" (Bob Weir, John Perry Barlow) – 4:09
4. "Dire Wolf" (Garcia, Hunter) – 4:05
5. "Cassidy" (Weir, Barlow) – 4:59
6. "Deal" (Garcia, Hunter) – 6:27
7. "Passenger" (Phil Lesh, Peter Monk) – 3:54
8. "Tennessee Jed" (Garcia, Hunter) – 8:29
9. "New Minglewood Blues" (traditional, arranged by Grateful Dead) – 5:28
10. "Peggy-O" (traditional, arranged by Grateful Dead) – 9:29
11. "The Music Never Stopped" (Weir, Barlow) – 8:11

October 1 – second set:

12. "Bertha" (Garcia, Hunter) – 6:33 →
13. "Good Lovin'" (Rudy Clark, Arthur Resnick) – 5:23

Disc 2

October 1 – second set, continued:

1. "It Must Have Been the Roses" (Hunter) – 8:19
2. "Estimated Prophet" (Weir, Barlow) – 9:48 →
3. "Eyes of the World" (Garcia, Hunter) – 11:57 →
4. "Dancing in the Street" (William "Mickey" Stevenson, Marvin Gaye, Ivy Jo Hunter) – 10:41 →
5. "Drums" (Mickey Hart, Bill Kreutzmann) – 4:28 →
6. "Not Fade Away" (Norman Petty, Charles Hardin) – 10:41 →
7. "Black Peter" (Garcia, Hunter) – 8:58 →
8. "Around and Around" (Berry) – 8:25

Disc 3

October 2 – first set:

1. "Casey Jones" (Garcia, Hunter) – 10:32
2. "Jack Straw" (Weir, Hunter) – 5:04
3. "Sunrise" (Donna Godchaux) – 4:31
4. "Brown Eyed Women" (Garcia, Hunter) – 5:46
5. "El Paso" (Marty Robbins) – 4:34
6. "Dupree's Diamond Blues" (Garcia, Hunter) – 5:29
7. "Let It Grow" (Weir, Barlow) – 12:42
8. "Deal" (Garcia, Hunter) – 6:57

October 2 – second set:

9. "Samson and Delilah" (traditional, arranged by Weir) – 7:45

October 2 – encore:

10. "Johnny B. Goode" (Berry) – 4:48

Disc 4

October 2 – second set, continued:

1. "Scarlet Begonias" (Garcia, Hunter) – 9:37 →
2. "Fire on the Mountain" (Hart, Hunter) – 12:29
3. "Playing in the Band" (Weir, Hart, Hunter) – 8:53 →
4. "Drums" (Hart, Kreutzmann) – 6:08 →
5. "The Wheel" (Garcia, Hunter, Kreutzmann) – 5:17 →
6. "Truckin'" (Garcia, Weir, Lesh, Hunter) – 10:40 →
7. "The Other One" (Weir, Kreutzmann) – 5:30 →
8. "Wharf Rat" (Garcia, Hunter) – 10:51 →
9. "Sugar Magnolia" (Weir, Hunter) – 9:10

== Personnel ==
Grateful Dead

- Jerry Garcia – lead guitar, vocals
- Bob Weir – rhythm guitar, vocals
- Phil Lesh – bass guitar
- Mickey Hart – drums
- Bill Kreutzmann – drums
- Keith Godchaux – piano, keyboards
- Donna Godchaux – vocals

Production

- Produced by Grateful Dead
- Produced for release by David Lemieux
- Mastering: Jeffrey Norman
- Recording: Betty Cantor-Jackson
- Additional recording: Bob Menke
- Art direction, design: Steve Vance
- Cover art: John Vogl
- Photos: Bob Minkin
- Liner notes essays: Ray Robertson, David Lemieux

== Charts ==
Chart performance for Dave's Picks Volume 45
Chart (2023)	Peak position
US Billboard 200	18
US Top Rock Albums (Billboard)	5
