= June 1976 (album) =

Live album and box set by Grateful Dead
- Released: March 20, 2020
- Recorded: June 10–19, 1976
- Venues: Boston Music Hall; Beacon Theatre; Capitol Theatre
- Genre: Rock
- Label: Rhino
- Producer: Grateful Dead

Grateful Dead chronology
Dave's Picks Volume 33 (2020)	June 1976 (2020)	Dave's Picks Volume 34 (2020)

Grateful Dead concert box set chronology
Giants Stadium 1987, 1989, 1991 (2019)	June 1976 (2020)	Listen to the River: St. Louis '71 '72 '73 (2021)

June 1976 is a live album by the rock band the Grateful Dead. Packaged as a box set, it comprises five complete concerts on 15 CDs. It was recorded from June 10 to June 19, 1976 at the Boston Music Hall in Boston, the Beacon Theatre in New York City, and the Capitol Theatre in Passaic, New Jersey. It was released on March 20, 2020 in a limited edition of 12,000 copies.

The shows included in the box set were part of the Grateful Dead's first concert tour following a year-and-a-half period during which they performed live only a few times. This tour also marked the return of Mickey Hart after a five year absence from the band.

== June 1976 concert tour ==
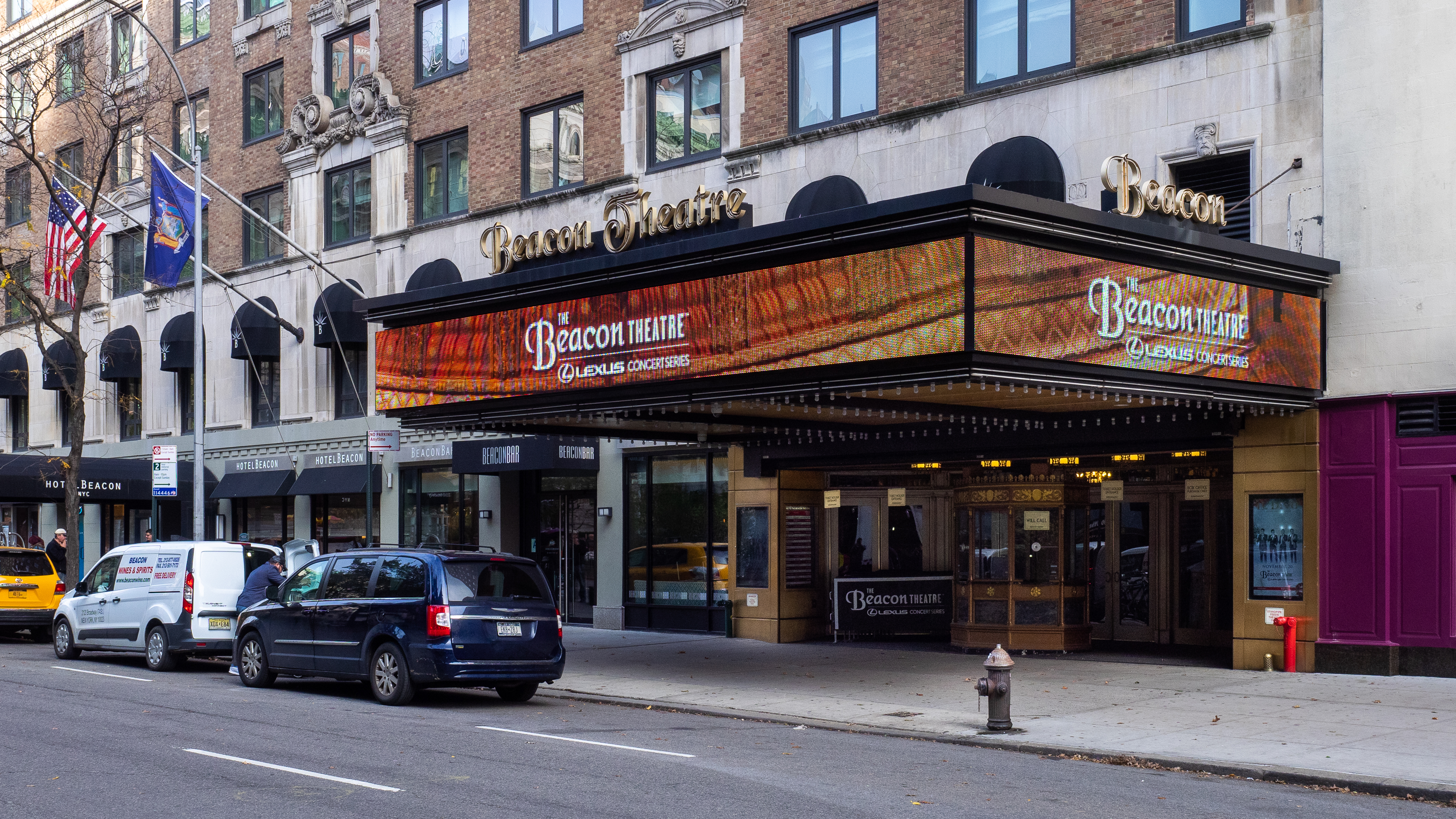
The Beacon Theatre in 2019

In June 1976 the Grateful Dead played a concert tour, their first since September 1974. They performed shows at these venues:

- Paramount Theatre, Portland, Oregon – June 3, 4
- Boston Music Hall, Boston, Massachusetts – June 9, 10, (Note: included in the June 1976 box set) 11, 12
- Beacon Theatre, New York, New York – June 14, 15
- Capitol Theatre, Passaic, New Jersey – June 17, 18, 19
- Tower Theater, Upper Darby Township, Pennsylvania – June 21, 22, 23, 24
- Auditorium Theatre, Chicago, Illinois – June 26, 27, 28, 29

== Critical reception ==
On AllMusic, Timothy Monger said, "With percussionist Mickey Hart back in the lineup full-time and a clutch of new material both from the Blues for Allah LP as well as various members' solo and side projects, the rejuvenated Dead set out to reestablish themselves on the road with a summer 1976 tour. Captured during a ten-day run by longtime engineer Betty Cantor-Jackson, this set featured previously unreleased complete-show recordings..."

== Track listing ==
Disc 1

Boston Music Hall, June 10, 1976 – first set:

1. "Promised Land" (Chuck Berry) – 3:51
2. "Sugaree" (Jerry Garcia, Robert Hunter) – 9:52
3. "Cassidy" (Bob Weir, John Perry Barlow) – 5:00
4. "They Love Each Other" (Garcia, Hunter) – 8:29
5. "The Music Never Stopped" (Weir, Barlow) – 5:47
6. "Brown-Eyed Women" (Garcia, Hunter) – 5:37
7. "Lazy Lightning" > (Weir, Barlow) – 2:56
8. "Supplication" (Weir, Barlow) – 4:26
9. "Row Jimmy" (Garcia, Hunter) – 9:23
10. "Big River" (Johnny Cash) – 6:28
11. "Mission in the Rain" (Garcia, Hunter) – 7:27
12. "Looks Like Rain" (Weir, Barlow) – 9:08

Disc 2

1. "Might as Well" (Garcia, Hunter) – 6:11

Boston Music Hall, June 10, 1976 – second set:

2. "Samson and Delilah" (traditional, arranged by Weir) – 7:18
3. "Help on the Way" > (Garcia, Hunter) – 4:47
4. "Slipknot!" > (Garcia, Keith Godchaux, Bill Kreutzmann, Phil Lesh, Weir) – 6:59
5. "Franklin's Tower" (Garcia, Kreutzmann, Hunter) – 11:17
6. "Let It Grow" (Weir, Barlow) – 11:36
7. "Friend of the Devil" (Garcia, John Dawson, Hunter) – 8:11

Disc 3

1. "Playing in the Band" > (Weir, Mickey Hart, Hunter) – 14:37
2. "Dancing in the Street" > (William "Mickey" Stevenson, Marvin Gaye, Ivy Jo Hunter) – 11:02
3. "U.S. Blues" (Garcia, Hunter) – 5:49

Disc 4

Boston Music Hall, June 11, 1976 – first set:

1. "Might as Well" (Garcia, Hunter) – 6:09
2. "Mama Tried" (Merle Haggard) – 3:24
3. "Tennessee Jed" (Garcia, Hunter) – 8:59
4. "Cassidy" (Weir, Barlow) – 5:06
5. "Candyman" (Garcia, Hunter) – 8:28
6. "Big River" (Cash) – 6:18
7. "Scarlet Begonias" (Garcia, Hunter) – 10:16
8. "Looks Like Rain" (Weir, Barlow) – 8:53
9. "It Must Have Been the Roses" (Hunter) – 7:11
10. "Lazy Lightning" > (Weir, Barlow) – 2:53
11. "Supplication" (Weir, Barlow) – 5:21
12. "Brown-Eyed Women" (Garcia, Hunter) – 5:09

Disc 5

1. "Promised Land" (Berry) – 3:56

Boston Music Hall, June 11, 1976 – second set:

2. "St. Stephen" > (Garcia, Lesh, Hunter) – 9:49
3. "Dancing in the Street" > (Stevenson, Gaye, I. J. Hunter) – 11:58
4. "The Music Never Stopped" (Weir, Barlow) – 5:42
5. "Ship of Fools" (Garcia, Hunter) – 7:11

Disc 6

1. "Samson and Delilah" (traditional, arranged by Weir) – 7:09
2. "Sugaree" (Hunter, Garcia) – 11:05
3. "Sugar Magnolia" > (Weir, Hunter) – 6:04
4. "Eyes of the World" > (Garcia, Hunter) – 13:13
5. "Stella Blue" (Garcia, Hunter) – 10:49
6. "Sunshine Daydream" (Weir, Hunter) – 3:29

Boston Music Hall, June 11, 1976 – encore:

7. "Johnny B. Goode" (Berry) – 4:15

Disc 7

Beacon Theatre, June 14, 1976 – first set:

1. "Cold Rain and Snow" (traditional, arranged by Grateful Dead) – 6:49
2. "Mama Tried" (Haggard) – 3:45
3. "Row Jimmy" (Garcia, Hunter) – 10:13
4. "Cassidy" (Weir, Barlow) – 5:08
5. "Brown-Eyed Women" (Garcia, Hunter) – 5:26
6. "Big River" (Cash) – 6:21
7. "Might as Well" (Garcia, Hunter) – 6:00
8. "Lazy Lightning" > (Weir, Barlow) – 2:56
9. "Supplication" (Weir, Barlow) – 4:53
10. "Tennessee Jed" (Garcia, Hunter) – 8:57

Disc 8

1. "Playing in the Band" (Weir, Hart, Hunter) – 19:40

Beacon Theatre, June 14, 1976 – second set:

2. "The Wheel" (Garcia, Hunter) – 6:09
3. "Samson and Delilah" (traditional, arranged by Weir) – 6:36
4. "High Time" (Garcia, Hunter) – 9:52
5. "The Music Never Stopped" (Weir, Barlow) – 5:26
6. "Crazy Fingers" > (Garcia, Hunter) – 11:33

Disc 9

1. "Dancing in the Street" > (Stevenson, Gaye, I. J. Hunter) – 12:37
2. "Cosmic Charlie" (Garcia, Hunter) – 8:47
3. "Help on the Way" > (Garcia, Hunter) – 4:55
4. "Slipknot!" > (Garcia, Godchaux, Kreutzmann, Lesh, Weir) – 13:00
5. "Franklin's Tower" > (Garcia, Kreutzmann, Hunter) – 11:03
6. "Around and Around" (Berry) – 7:18

Beacon Theatre, June 14, 1976 – encore:

7. "U.S. Blues" (Garcia, Hunter) – 5:52

Disc 10

Beacon Theatre, June 15, 1976 – first set:

1. "Promised Land" (Berry) – 4:26
2. "Sugaree" (Garcia, Hunter) – 9:44
3. "Cassidy" (Weir, Barlow) – 4:58
4. "Candyman" (Garcia, Hunter) – 7:48
5. "The Music Never Stopped" (Weir, Barlow) – 5:54
6. "It Must Have Been the Roses" (Hunter) – 7:16
7. "Looks Like Rain" (Weir, Barlow) – 7:06
8. "Tennessee Jed" (Garcia, Hunter) – 9:44
9. "Let It Grow" > (Weir, Barlow) – 13:14
10. "Might as Well" (Garcia, Hunter) – 5:26

Disc 11

Beacon Theatre, June 15, 1976 – second set:

1. "St. Stephen" > (Garcia, Lesh, Hunter) – 11:11
2. "Not Fade Away" > (Buddy Holly, Norman Petty) – 12:15
3. "Stella Blue" (Garcia, Hunter) – 13:53
4. "Samson and Delilah" (traditional, arranged by Weir) – 6:25
5. "Friend of the Devil" (Garcia, Dawson, Hunter) – 8:24

Disc 12

1. "Dancing in the Street" > (Stevenson, Gaye, I. J. Hunter) – 13:01
2. "The Wheel" > (Garcia, Hunter) – 4:44
3. "Sugar Magnolia" (Weir, Hunter) – 6:05
4. "Scarlet Begonias" > (Garcia, Hunter) – 4:48
5. "Sunshine Daydream" (Weir, Hunter) – 3:39

Beacon Theatre, June 15, 1976 – encore:

6. "Johnny B. Goode" (Berry) – 4:12

Disc 13

Capitol Theatre, June 19, 1976 – first set:

1. "Help on the Way" > (Garcia, Hunter) – 5:50
2. "Slipknot!" > (Garcia, Godchaux, Kreutzmann, Lesh, Weir) – 6:30
3. "Franklin's Tower" > (Garcia, Kreutzmann, Hunter) – 9:38
4. "The Music Never Stopped" (Weir, Barlow) – 6:05
5. "Brown-Eyed Women" (Garcia, Hunter) – 5:27
6. "Cassidy" (Weir, Barlow) – 4:55
7. "They Love Each Other" (Garcia, Hunter) – 7:34
8. "Looks Like Rain" (Weir, Barlow) – 8:02
9. "Tennessee Jed" (Garcia, Hunter) – 8:29

Disc 14

1. "Playing in the Band" (Weir, Hart, Hunter) – 19:14

Capitol Theatre, June 19, 1976 – second set:

2. "Might as Well" (Garcia, Hunter) – 6:25
3. "Samson and Delilah" (traditional, arranged by Weir) – 7:07
4. "High Time" (Garcia, Hunter) – 9:38

Disc 15

1. "Let It Grow" > (Weir, Barlow) – 13:09
2. "Dancing in the Street" > (Stevenson, Gaye, I. J. Hunter) – 10:20
3. "Cosmic Charlie" (Garcia, Hunter) – 9:11
4. "Around and Around" > (Berry) – 6:28
5. "Goin' Down the Road Feeling Bad" > (traditional, arranged by Grateful Dead) – 7:16
6. "One More Saturday Night" (Weir) – 4:58

Capitol Theatre, June 19, 1976 – encore:

7. "Not Fade Away" (Holly, Petty) – 8:03

== Personnel ==
Grateful Dead

- Jerry Garcia – guitar, vocals
- Donna Jean Godchaux – vocals
- Keith Godchaux – keyboards
- Mickey Hart – drums
- Bill Kreutzmann – drums
- Phil Lesh – bass
- Bob Weir – guitar, vocals

Production

- Produced by Grateful Dead
- Produced for release by David Lemieux
- Associate Producer: Ivette Ramos
- Recording: Betty Cantor-Jackson
- Mastering: Jeffrey Norman
- Tape restoration and speed correction: Jamie Howarth, John Chester
- Art direction: Lisa Glines, Steve Vance, Justin Helton
- Artwork: Justin Helton
- Package design: Steve Vance
- Photos: Grant Gouldon
- Liner notes: Jesse Jarnow

== Charts ==
Sales chart performance for June 1976
Chart (2020)	Peak position
US Billboard 200	90
US Top Rock Albums (Billboard)	7
