= Marie Adams =

American singer (1925–1998)

Background information
- Also known as: Ollie Marie Adams "TV Mama"
- Born: Ollie Marie Givens; October 19, 1925; Linden, Texas, United States
- Died: February 23, 1998 (aged 72) Houston, Texas, United States
- Genres: R&B, gospel, pop
- Occupation: Singer
- Years active: c.1950–1980
- Labels: Peacock, Capitol
- Formerly of: The Three Tons of Joy

Marie Adams (born Ollie Marie Givens, October 19, 1925 – February 23, 1998) was an American gospel and R&B singer, who became popular in the 1950s particularly for her work with Johnny Otis.

== Biography ==
She was born in Linden, Texas, and sang in gospel groups in her youth. After marrying, she began performing in Houston as Ollie Marie Adams, later dropping her first name. She made her first recordings for Don Robey's Peacock Records with Bill Harvey's band. Her single "I'm Gonna Play the Honky Tonks" coupled with "My Search Is Over", with the writing of both songs credited to Robey, reached number 3 on the Billboard R&B chart in mid-1952, becoming the most successful record on Peacock at that point. In all, she released seven singles on Peacock, including a cover version of her label-mate Johnny Ace's "My Song".

Adams toured widely in the early 1950s on shows featuring Johnny Ace, Jimmy Forrest, B.B. King, Clarence "Gatemouth" Brown, and Lloyd Price. In 1953, she joined the Johnny Otis band as a featured singer, and moved to Los Angeles. After Johnny Ace's death, she recorded the tribute song, "In Memory", which was regularly played by radio DJ Alan Freed but failed to chart. She toured with Johnny Otis through much of the 1950s, and became a popular live performer, being known as "TV Mama" in recognition of her "wide screen" girth. As a mainstay of the Johnny Otis Revue, she recruited sisters Sadie and Francine McKinley to form The Three Tons of Joy, considered "an appropriate name as the three women weighed around 800 pounds together."

In 1957, Johnny Otis signed to Capitol Records. The label released four singles in Otis' name simultaneously, including "Ma! He's Making Eyes at Me". This was overdubbed with audience reaction noises, and was credited to Johnny Otis and his Orchestra, with Marie Adams and The Three Tons of Joy. Although the record did not make the charts in the US, it was released in the UK and rose to number 2 on the UK Singles Chart in early 1958. To follow up its success, Adams and Otis recorded a duet, "Bye Bye Baby", which reached number 20 in Britain. However, other recordings by Adams with Otis, including their version of "What Do You Want to Make Those Eyes at Me For?" (covered in Britain by Emile Ford and the Checkmates) were less commercially successful, and in early 1960 Adams and the Three Tons of Joy left the Johnny Otis Show.

Marie Adams and the Three Tons of Joy continued to work in and around Los Angeles, and Adams recorded for several small labels in the early 1960s. In 1972, she returned to work with Johnny Otis, and toured in Britain for the first time. She continued performing with Johnny Otis for much of the 1970s before retiring.

She died in Houston in 1998, aged 72.
