= Bill Harvey (bandleader) =

American rhythm and blues saxophonist and bandleader

William G. Harvey (October 1918 – October 6, 1964) was an American rhythm and blues saxophonist and bandleader.

Born in Winona, Mississippi, he moved with his mother to Memphis, Tennessee, as a child. He became the leader of one of the most successful performing bands in Memphis immediately after World War II, establishing a residency at Mitchell's Hotel on Beale Street. In 1950, he signed a deal with Don Robey's Peacock Records in Houston, Texas, and his band featured on many of the successful R&B records released by Peacock and Duke Records during the 1950s, including those by Marie Adams, Big Mama Thornton, Bobby "Blue" Bland, and Little Junior Parker. He also led Clarence "Gatemouth" Brown's touring band. In 1952, he signed with B.B. King to become the blues singer and guitarist's bandleader, a role he continued for the next four years.

Harvey suffered from diabetes and, after having both his legs amputated, died in Memphis in 1964, aged 46.
