= China Cat Sunflower =

- Japanese single cover, 1969

Single by Grateful Dead

from the album Aoxomoxoa
- B-side: "St. Stephen"
- Released: June 20, 1969
- Studio: Pacific Recording Studios; San Mateo, California
- Genre: Psychedelic rock
- Length: 3:40
- Label: Warner Bros.
- Composer: Jerry Garcia
- Lyricist: Robert Hunter
- Producer: Grateful Dead

Grateful Dead singles chronology
"Dupree's Diamond Blues" / "Cosmic Charlie" (1969)	"China Cat Sunflower" / "St. Stephen" (1969)	"Uncle John's Band" / "New Speedway Boogie" (1970)

"China Cat Sunflower" is a song by the Grateful Dead, which was first recorded for their 1969 studio album Aoxomoxoa. The lyrics were written by Robert Hunter and the music composed by Jerry Garcia. The song was typically sung by Garcia. The first live recording of this song appeared on Europe '72, paired (as was typical) with "I Know You Rider". Lyrically, this song has many literary references, including Lewis Carroll's Alice in Wonderland, George Herriman's Krazy Kat, and Dame Edith Sitwell's "Polka".

== Music and lyrical composition ==
The song begins with two distinct guitar riffs. The first is played by Jerry Garcia and then a second one played by Bob Weir is interwoven on top of it. This second riff has been described by author Eric F. Wybenga as "that dodgy little Bobby intro that scratches your brain just behind the ears."

Wybenga described the lyrics as "acid-drenched", and said, further: "China Cat Sunflower's lyric—composed, Robert Hunter has said, in a state where contemplation of a cat served as touchstone for an interplanetary journey—is a real masterwork. It's one of the very few rock-and-roll lyrics (including Dylan's) that has as much impact on the page as it does sung, if not more. ... 'It's about acid' does it less justice than the observation that it's about seeing, sensing, and making connections in a sensuous world. Anyone out there remember what it was like to be three years old?"

== Live performances ==
The Grateful Dead first performed "China Cat Sunflower" on January 17, 1968, at the Fillmore West (then called the Carousel Ballroom) in San Francisco. During the following year after its introduction into the band's set list, the song was played by itself or often in the middle of an extended jam between the songs "Dark Star" and "The Eleven"—a position more familiarly (to Deadheads) filled by "St. Stephen". During this period it was played in the key of E. It was later changed to G in order to transition into I Know You Rider. Five instances of this arrangement have been released on official recordings, the first on the compilation album So Many Roads (1965–1995), the second and third on Dick's Picks Volume 22, and the other two on Road Trips Volume 2 Number 2.

=== China Cat Sunflower → I Know You Rider ===
On September 30, 1969, the Grateful Dead first segued "China Cat Sunflower" into "I Know You Rider" (a traditional folk song) at Cafe Au Go Go in New York City. Over the next 26 years the Dead would pair these songs together over 500 times, most often as a second set opener. Only twice during this extended period was "China Cat Sunflower" played without this pairing.

== In popular culture ==
The song is available in the Rock Band video game series as downloadable content, along with 17 other Grateful Dead songs.

In the 2009 Ang Lee film Taking Woodstock, the version of the song from Europe '72 is used in the part of the film showing everyone arriving at Woodstock in 1969.

In 2020 entomologist J.H. Epler named a new species of diving beetle (family Dytiscidae) for the song; it is called Uvarus sinofelihelianthus. The specific epithet can be interpreted as (sino) China (feli) cat (helianthus) sunflower.

In August 2026, Rolling Stone ranked this song as the 7th best Grateful Dead song of all time.
