= Uncle John's Band =

Grateful Dead song

- French single cover, 1970

Single by Grateful Dead

from the album Workingman's Dead
- B-side: "New Speedway Boogie"
- Released: July 1, 1970
- Studio: Pacific High, San Francisco
- Genre: Folk rock
- Length: 4:42
- Label: Warner Bros.
- Composer: Jerry Garcia
- Lyricist: Robert Hunter
- Producers: Bob Matthews; Betty Cantor; Grateful Dead

Grateful Dead singles chronology
| "Dupree's Diamond Blues" (1969) | "Uncle John's Band" (1970) | "Truckin'" (1970) |

"Uncle John's Band" is a song by the Grateful Dead that first appeared in their concert setlists in late 1969. The band recorded it for their 1970 album Workingman's Dead. Written by guitarist Jerry Garcia and lyricist Robert Hunter, "Uncle John's Band" presents the Dead in an acoustic and musically concise mode, with close harmony singing.

The song is one of the band's best known, and is included on the Rock and Roll Hall of Fame's 500 Songs that Shaped Rock and Roll. In 2001 it was named 321st (of 365) in the Songs of the Century project list. In August 2026, Rolling Stone ranked "UJB" as the 6th best Grateful Dead song of all time.

== Music and lyrics ==
"Uncle John's Band" has one of the Dead's most immediately accessible and memorable melodies, set against a bluegrass-inspired folk arrangement with acoustic guitars. Specific lyrics ("It's a Buckdancer's Choice my friend; better take my advice", "the fire from the ice", "don't tread on me", "It's the same story the crow told me") allude to various folk, mountain, or bluegrass tunes known to be in band members' repertoire.

== Single and album history ==
Warner Bros. Records released "Uncle John's Band," backed with "New Speedway Boogie," as a single in 1970, receiving only limited airplay due to its length. Garcia worked with Warners to cut it down, though he later called the mix "an atrocity." "I gave them instructions on how to properly edit it and they garbled it so completely," Garcia commented. The original album version ended up getting more air play than the revised Warner Bros. version.

While the single was the group's first chart hit (peaking at No. 69 on the Billboard Hot 100), it had a greater impact than its chart performance indicates, receiving airplay on progressive rock radio stations and others with looser playlists. At a time when the Grateful Dead were already an underground legend, "Uncle John's Band" (and to some degree its albummate "Casey Jones") was the first time many in the general rock audience actually heard the band's music.

Moreover, the song affected the mainstream because of first using the word "goddamn" in the unedited single, which many radio stations played instead of the edited version; together with the reference to cocaine in "Casey Jones," the two songs made the band a "thorn in the side of Nixon that became a badge of honor to the masses."

== Personnel ==
According to the Grateful Dead Family Discography:

- Jerry Garcia – lead vocals, lead guitar, lap steel guitar
- Phil Lesh – bass, vocals
- Bob Weir – guitar, backing vocals
- Ron “Pigpen” McKernan – keyboards, backing vocals
- Mickey Hart - drums
- Bill Kreutzmann – drums

== Cover versions ==
- It was covered by Jimmy Buffett on his 1994 album Fruitcakes.
- Reggae musician Joe Higgs recorded a version of the song for the 1996 compilation Fire on the Mountain: Reggae Celebrates the Grateful Dead.
- It was covered by the Indigo Girls for the 1991 Grateful Dead tribute compilation Deadicated. The recording also appeared on their album Rarities.
- Crosby, Stills & Nash covered the song live during their 2009 US concert tour.
- Stanford Marching Band has covered this song.
- Day of the Dead, a 2016 Red Hot compilation, includes a cover by Lucius.
- Dispatch initially covered this song during their 2017 acoustic tour, and continued to play it live through their 2019 tour.

== Charts ==
1970 singles charts
| Chart | Peak |
|---|---|
| Canadian RPM 100 Singles | 87 |
| US Billboard Hot 100 | 69 |
| US Cash Box Top 100 | 84 |
| US Record World 100 Top Pops | 66 |
