= I Know You Rider =

Traditional blues song

"I Know You Rider" (also "Woman Blues" and "I Know My Rider") is a traditional blues song that has been adapted by numerous artists. It has appeared in folk, country, and rock guises.

== Blues origins ==
Modern versions can be traced back to Blind Lemon Jefferson's "Deceitful Brownskin Blues", which was released as a single in 1927. It appears in a 1934 book, American Ballads and Folk Songs, by the noted father-and-son musicologists and folklorists John Lomax and Alan Lomax. The book notes that "An eighteen-year-old black girl, in prison for murder, sang the song and the first stanza of these blues." The Lomaxes then added a number of verses from other sources and named it "Woman Blue". The music and melody are similar to Lucille Bogan's "B.D. Woman Blues" (c. 1935), although the lyrics are completely different.

== Folk rediscovery ==
By the mid-1950s, traditional musician Bob Coltman had found the song in the American Ballads and Folk Songs book and began singing an arrangement of it that he performed in folk circles around Philadelphia and Boston circa 1957-1960. In 1959, Coltman taught it to Tossi Aaron who recorded a version in 1960 for her album Tossi Sings Folk Songs & Ballads on Prestige International. Joan Baez recorded a version for her self-titled 1960 debut album on Vanguard Records, but the track was not released until a 2001 CD re-issue of the album.

Throughout the early 1960s, the song gained popularity due to folk performers, most notably the Kingston Trio, who included the song "Rider" on their album Sunny Side! in 1963; it was also recorded by the Big 3, an American folk trio that featured Cass Elliot. Folk singer Judy Roderick also recorded a version of the song under the title "Woman Blue" and it became the title track of her second album, recorded and released by Vanguard in 1965. British folk singer John Renbourn recorded a version of the song (titled "I Know My Babe") and it was included on his 1967 solo album, Another Monday.

== Early rock performances and recordings ==
By the mid-1960s, rock acts had begun to perform and record the song. The Astronauts released a version on their 1967 album, Travelin' Men. Folk rock band the Byrds recorded the song during 1966, under the title "I Know My Rider (I Know You Rider)", but their version remained unreleased until 1987, when it was included on the archival Never Before album. It was later included as a bonus track on the expanded CD edition of the Byrds' Fifth Dimension album. The Byrds also performed the song at the Monterey International Pop Festival in June 1967, though that performance was only officially released in 2024.

James Taylor recorded the song as "Circle Round the Sun" on his 1968 debut album James Taylor). Big Brother and the Holding Company, featuring Janis Joplin, performed it in concert and a rendition from 1966 was released in 1984 on the live album Cheaper Thrills. Blues rock duo Hot Tuna included a version of the song titled "Know You Rider" on their debut live album, Hot Tuna, and have played the song live many times since.

The song was a staple of the Grateful Dead's live shows from the beginning of the band's existence in 1965. According to author David R. Shumway, the band's adoption of the song represented the forging of a bridge between their psychedelic music and their more traditional country and folk material. It was often performed by the band as a connecting song from "China Cat Sunflower" and this combination was featured on their 1972 triple live album Europe '72. The Grateful Dead's segue approach to the song was later used by Bruce Hornsby and the Range in the late 1980s, with "I Know You Rider" following their song, "The Red Plains".

In August 2026, Rolling Stone ranked this song as the 77th best Grateful Dead song of all time.

The progressive bluegrass group The Seldom Scene recorded it as "Rider" on their 1973 album Act III. The Dutch progressive rock band Galaxy-Lin released a version of the song (titled "I Know My Baby") on their 1975 album, G.

== Later appearances ==
The song was also covered by reggae/rock fusion artists Slightly Stoopid on their 2008 album Slightly Not Stoned Enough to Eat Breakfast Yet Stoopid and Big House on their 2008 Never Ending Train album. It has also been partially covered by experimental folk band Akron/Family. The International Tussler Society, a band of key members of the Norwegian prog-rock band Motorpsycho, has also recorded a version, available on the album The Tussler – Original Motion Picture Soundtrack (1994/1996). The album was the soundtrack to a fictional Spaghetti Western by non-existent director Theo Buhara. Its country rock sound marked a drastic departure from the earlier Motorpsycho-related records. Marty Stuart and His Fabulous Superlatives often opened their concerts with "I Know You(r) Rider" between 2015 and 2017, and continued to perform it live as of late 2021.
