= Dozin' at the Knick =

Live album by The Grateful Dead
- Released: October 1996
- Recorded: March 24–26, 1990
- Genre: Rock
- Label: Grateful Dead / Wea
- Producers: John Cutler, Phil Lesh

The Grateful Dead chronology
Dick's Picks Volume 5 (1996)	Dozin' at the Knick (1996)	Dick's Picks Volume 6 (1996)

Professional ratings
Review scores
Source	Rating
AllMusic	4/5 stars
Robert Christgau	(A−)

Dozin' at the Knick is a live album of the Grateful Dead performing in concert at the Knickerbocker Arena in Albany, New York. It was recorded March 24–26, 1990, and was released in 1996. The album was certified Gold by the RIAA on March 28, 2000.

The three concerts were subsequently released in their entirety on the following releases:

- March 24, 1990 : Combination of this release plus Without a Net, Spring 1990 and Postcards of the Hanging
- March 25, 1990 : Spring 1990 (The Other One)
- March 26, 1990 : Spring 1990

== Track listing ==
Disc 1
No.	Title	Writer(s)	Recording date	Length
1.	"Hell in a Bucket"	Bob Weir, Brent Mydland, John Perry Barlow	March 26, set I	6:08
2.	"Dupree's Diamond Blues"	Jerry Garcia, Robert Hunter	March 26, set I	5:36
3.	"Just a Little Light"	Mydland, Barlow	March 26, set I	4:45
4.	"Walkin' Blues"	Robert Johnson, arr. Weir	March 24, set I	6:11
5.	"Jack-A-Roe"	Traditional, arr. Grateful Dead	March 25, set I	4:14
6.	"Never Trust A Woman"	Mydland	March 25, set I	7:06
7.	"When I Paint My Masterpiece"	Bob Dylan	March 25, set I	5:02
8.	"Row Jimmy"	Garcia, Hunter	March 26, set I	10:26
9.	"Blow Away"	Mydland, Barlow	March 26, set I	11:14

Disc 2
No.	Title	Writer(s)	Recording date	Length
1.	"Playing in the Band →"	Weir, Mickey Hart, Hunter	March 24, set II	10:08
2.	"Uncle John's Band →"	Garcia, Hunter	March 24, set II	10:01
3.	"Lady with a Fan →"	Garcia, Hunter	March 24, set II	6:35
4.	"Terrapin Station →"	Garcia, Hunter	March 24, set II	6:45
5.	"Mud Love Buddy Jam →"	Grateful Dead	March 24, set II	7:53
6.	"Drums →"	Hart, Kreutzmann	March 24, set II	9:41
7.	"Space →"	Garcia, Phil Lesh, Weir	March 24, set II	9:39

Disc 3
No.	Title	Writer(s)	Recording date	Length
1.	"Space (continued) →"	Garcia, Lesh, Weir	March 24, set II	1:03
2.	"The Wheel →"	Garcia, Hunter	March 24, set II	4:45
3.	"All Along the Watchtower →"	Dylan	March 24, set II	7:45
4.	"Stella Blue →"	Garcia, Hunter	March 24, set II	8:32
5.	"Not Fade Away"	Charles Hardin, Norman Petty	March 24, set II	7:24
6.	"And We Bid You Goodnight"	Traditional, arr. Grateful Dead	March 24, encore	2:21
7.	"Space →"	Garcia, Lesh, Mydland, Weir	March 25, set II	1:31
8.	"I Will Take You Home →"	Mydland	March 25, set II	4:17
9.	"Goin' Down the Road Feeling Bad →"	Traditional, arr. Grateful Dead	March 25, set II	6:59
10.	"Black Peter →"	Garcia, Hunter	March 25, set II	9:08
11.	"Around and Around"	Berry	March 25, set II	5:57
12.	"Brokedown Palace"	Garcia, Hunter	March 26, encore	5:20

== Personnel ==
- Jerry Garcia – guitar, vocals
- Bob Weir – guitar, vocals
- Phil Lesh – bass guitar
- Brent Mydland – keyboards, vocals
- Bill Kreutzmann – drums
- Mickey Hart – drums

== Recording dates ==
- Disc 1
  - Track 4 recorded on March 24
  - Tracks 5–7 recorded on March 25 (later remixed and released on Spring 1990 (The Other One))
  - Tracks 1–3 and 8–9 recorded on March 26 (later remixed and released on Spring 1990)
- Disc 2 recorded on March 24
- Disc 3
  - Tracks 1–6 recorded on March 24
  - Tracks 7–11 recorded on March 25 (later remixed and released on Spring 1990 (The Other One))
  - Track 12 recorded on March 26 (later remixed and released on Spring 1990)

Two additional tracks from March 24 were also released: "Desolation Row" on Postcards of the Hanging, and "One More Saturday Night" on Without A Net.

== Charts ==
Chart (1996)	Peak position
US Billboard 200	74
