= Spring 1990 (The Other One) =

Live album and box set by Grateful Dead
- Released: September 9, 2014
- Recorded: March 14 – April 3, 1990
- Genre: Rock
- Label: Rhino
- Producer: Grateful Dead

Grateful Dead chronology
Dave's Picks Volume 11 (2014)	Spring 1990 (The Other One) (2014)	Wake Up to Find Out (2014)

Grateful Dead concert box set chronology
May 1977 (2013)	Spring 1990 (The Other One) (2014)	30 Trips Around the Sun (2015)

Spring 1990 (The Other One) is a live album by the rock band the Grateful Dead. Packaged as a box set, it contains eight complete concerts on 23 CDs, recorded during the band's spring 1990 concert tour. It was produced as a limited edition of 9,000 numbered copies, and was released by Rhino Records on September 9, 2014. In addition to the music CDs, the box set includes a 144-page paperback book, three art prints, and replica tickets stubs and backstage passes from all eight shows.

Spring 1990 (The Other One) is a follow-up to the Spring 1990 box set, released in 2012, which contained six other concerts from the same tour, on 18 CDs. Between those two box sets and the albums Dozin' at the Knick, Postcards of the Hanging, Without a Net and Terrapin Station (Limited Edition), the entire spring 1990 concert tour has been officially released. This is the second complete tour by the band to be released officially (following Europe 72: The Complete Recordings and preceding July 1978: The Complete Recordings), though several venue runs have also been released, as well as the middle of the May 1977 tour (released in 2013 as live album May 1977).

One of the concerts included in Spring 1990 (The Other One) – the one recorded on March 29, 1990 at Nassau Coliseum, with Branford Marsalis sitting in on saxophone for much of the show – was also released separately on September 9, 2014, as the album Wake Up to Find Out.

Spring 1990 (The Other One) was nominated for a Grammy Award for Best Boxed or Special Limited Edition Package.

== Concerts ==
Spring 1990 (The Other One) contains the following complete concerts:

- March 14, 1990 – Capital Centre, Landover, Maryland
- March 18, 1990 – Hartford Civic Center, Hartford, Connecticut
- March 21, 1990 – Copps Coliseum, Hamilton, Ontario
- March 25, 1990 – Knickerbocker Arena, Albany, New York
- March 28, 1990 – Nassau Coliseum, Uniondale, New York
- March 29, 1990 – Nassau Coliseum, Uniondale, New York
- April 1, 1990 – The Omni, Atlanta
- April 3, 1990 – The Omni, Atlanta, Georgia

== Personnel ==
Grateful Dead

- Jerry Garcia – guitar, vocals
- Mickey Hart – drums
- Bill Kreutzmann – drums
- Phil Lesh – electric bass, vocals
- Brent Mydland – keyboards, vocals
- Bob Weir – guitar, vocals

Additional musicians

- Branford Marsalis – saxophone at the March 29 concert

Production

- Produced by Grateful Dead
- Produced for release by David Lemieux
- Recording: John Cutler
- Mixing: Jeffrey Norman
- Mastering: David Glasser
- Artwork: Jessica Dessner

== Track listing ==
=== March 14, 1990 – Capital Centre, Landover, Maryland ===
Disc 1
First set:

1. "Cold Rain and Snow" (traditional, arranged by Grateful Dead) – 6:56
2. "Feel Like a Stranger" (Bob Weir, John Barlow) – 7:44
3. "Never Trust a Woman" (Brent Mydland) – 6:27
4. "Mama Tried" > (Merle Haggard) – 2:31
5. "Big River" (Johnny Cash) – 5:21
6. "Loose Lucy" (Jerry Garcia, Robert Hunter) – 6:56
7. "Stuck Inside of Mobile with the Memphis Blues Again" (Bob Dylan) – 8:50
8. "Row Jimmy" (Garcia, Hunter) – 10:17
9. "Let It Grow" (Weir, Barlow) – 11:54 (Note: Previously released on Without a Net)

Disc 2
Second set:

1. "Crazy Fingers" > (Garcia, Hunter) – 8:12
2. "Playing in the Band" > (Weir, Mickey Hart, Hunter) – 10:27
3. "Uncle John's Band" > (Garcia, Hunter) – 8:05
4. "Jam" > (Grateful Dead) – 7:12
5. "Drums" > (Hart, Bill Kreutzmann) – 7:38
6. "Space" > (Garcia, Phil Lesh, Mydland, Weir) – 6:34
7. "Dear Mr. Fantasy" > (Steve Winwood, Chris Wood, Jim Capaldi) – 5:53
8. "I Need a Miracle" > (Weir, Barlow) – 4:07
9. "Black Peter" > (Garcia, Hunter) – 7:53
10. "Turn On Your Lovelight" (Joseph Scott, Deadric Malone) – 6:01

Encore:

11. "Black Muddy River" (Garcia, Hunter) – 6:00

Note

- First "Loose Lucy" since Oct. 19, 1974

=== March 18, 1990 – Hartford Civic Center, Hartford, Connecticut ===
Disc 1
First set:

1. "Shakedown Street" > (Garcia, Hunter) – 12:45
2. "Little Red Rooster" (Willie Dixon) – 9:28
3. "Stagger Lee" (Garcia, Hunter) – 5:29
4. "Me and My Uncle" > (John Phillips) – 3:08
5. "Mexicali Blues" (Weir, Barlow) – 5:22
6. "Friend of the Devil" (Garcia, John Dawson, Hunter) – 8:44
7. "Just a Little Light" (Mydland, Barlow) – 5:55
8. "When I Paint My Masterpiece" (Dylan) – 5:32
9. "Ramble On Rose" (Garcia, Hunter) – 8:02
10. "The Music Never Stopped" (Weir, Barlow) – 7:38

Disc 2
Second set:

1. "Iko Iko" (James Crawford) – 8:08
2. "Looks Like Rain" (Weir, Barlow) – 8:27
3. "He's Gone" > (Garcia, Hunter) – 8:56
4. "Truckin'" > (Garcia, Lesh, Weir, Hunter) – 8:54
5. "Spoonful" > (Dixon) – 7:19
6. "Drums" > (Hart, Kreutzmann) – 6:52

Disc 3

1. "Space" > (Garcia, Lesh, Mydland, Weir) – 11:23
2. "The Wheel" > (Garcia, Hunter) – 5:49
3. "All Along the Watchtower" > (Dylan) – 6:06
4. "Morning Dew" (Bonnie Dobson, Tim Rose) – 11:32

Encore:

5. "U.S. Blues" (Garcia, Hunter) – 5:31

=== March 21, 1990 – Copps Coliseum, Hamilton, Ontario ===
Disc 1
First set:

1. "Mississippi Half-Step Uptown Toodeloo" (Garcia, Hunter) – 8:33 (Note: Previously released on Without a Net)
2. "New Minglewood Blues" (traditional, arranged by Grateful Dead) – 7:36
3. "Far From Me" (Mydland) – 5:05
4. "Queen Jane Approximately" (Dylan) – 6:29
5. "Loose Lucy" (Garcia, Hunter) – 7:27
6. "Victim or the Crime" > (Weir, Gerrit Graham) – 8:07
7. "Standing on the Moon" > (Garcia, Hunter) – 8:00
8. "Promised Land" (Chuck Berry) – 4:53

Disc 2
Second set:

1. "Hey Pocky Way" (Joseph Modeliste, Art Neville, Leo Nocentelli, George Porter Jr.) – 7:10
2. "Crazy Fingers" > (Garcia, Hunter) – 07:38
3. "Cumberland Blues" (Garcia, Lesh, Hunter) – 5:30
4. "Estimated Prophet" > (Weir, Barlow) – 11:51 (Note: Previously released on Weir Here)
5. "He's Gone" > (Garcia, Hunter) – 12:42
6. "Drums" > (Hart, Kreutzmann) – 9:37

Disc 3

1. "Space" > (Garcia, Lesh, Mydland, Weir) – 7:39
2. "I Need a Miracle" > (Weir, Barlow) – 4:16
3. "Wharf Rat" > (Garcia, Hunter) – 8:41
4. "Throwing Stones" > (Weir, Barlow) – 8:59
5. "Turn On Your Lovelight" (Scott, Malone) – 6:51

Encore:

6. "Knockin' on Heaven's Door" (Dylan) – 7:10

=== March 25, 1990 – Knickerbocker Arena, Albany, New York ===
Disc 1
First set:

1. "Greatest Story Ever Told" > (Weir, Hart, Hunter) – 4:06
2. "Touch of Grey" (Garcia, Hunter) – 6:42
3. "Wang Dang Doodle" (Dixon) – 7:22
4. "Never Trust a Woman" (Mydland) – 7:36 (Note: Previously released on Dozin' at the Knick)
5. "Jack-a-Roe" (traditional, arranged by Grateful Dead) – 4:36
6. "When I Paint My Masterpiece" (Dylan) – 5:27
7. "Bird Song" (Garcia, Hunter) – 13:08
8. "Let It Grow" (Weir, Barlow) – 11:36

Disc 2
Second set:

1. "Eyes of the World" > (Garcia, Hunter) – 13:26
2. "Samson and Delilah" (traditional, arranged by Grateful Dead) – 7:47
3. "Crazy Fingers" > (Garcia, Hunter) – 7:21
4. "Truckin'" > (Garcia, Lesh, Weir, Hunter) – 7:43
5. "Spoonful" > (Dixon) – 5:37
6. "Drums" > (Hart, Kreutzmann) – 9:59

Disc 3

1. "Space" > (Garcia, Lesh, Mydland, Weir) – 8:58
2. "I Will Take You Home" > (Mydland) – 4:18
3. "Goin' Down the Road Feeling Bad" > (traditional, arranged by Grateful Dead) – 6:58
4. "Black Peter" > (Garcia, Hunter) – 9:09
5. "Around and Around" (Berry) – 6:45

Encore:

6. "Quinn The Eskimo" (Dylan) – 4:40

=== March 28, 1990 – Nassau Coliseum, Uniondale, New York ===
Disc 1
First set:

1. "Cold Rain and Snow" > (traditional, arranged by Grateful Dead) – 6:29
2. "New Minglewood Blues" (traditional, arranged by Grateful Dead) – 7:27
3. "Easy to Love You" (Mydland) – 5:48 (Note: Previously used as audio for the video release Backstage Pass)
4. "High Time" (Garcia, Hunter) – 6:14
5. "Queen Jane Approximately" (Dylan) – 6:32
6. "Loose Lucy" (Garcia, Hunter) – 6:11
7. "Cassidy" > (Weir, Barlow) – 6:06
8. "Deal" (Garcia, Hunter) – 8:18

Disc 2
Second set:

1. "Foolish Heart" > (Garcia, Hunter) – 10:21
2. "Looks Like Rain" > (Weir, Barlow) – 8:09 (Note: Previously released on Without a Net)
3. "Cumberland Blues" > (Garcia, Lesh, Hunter) – 5:50
4. "The Weight" (Robbie Robertson) – 5:46
5. "Hey Pocky Way" > (Modeliste, Neville, Nocentelli, Porter) – 7:04
6. "Drums" > (Hart, Kreutzmann) – 11:17

Disc 3

1. "Space" > (Garcia, Lesh, Mydland, Weir) – 9:22
2. "The Other One" > (Weir, Kreutzmann) – 6:52
3. "Wharf Rat" > (Garcia, Hunter) – 10:35
4. "Good Lovin'" (Rudy Clark, Artie Resnick) – 7:52

Encore:

5. "Revolution" (John Lennon, Paul McCartney) – 4:55

=== March 29, 1990 – Nassau Coliseum, Uniondale, New York ===
Disc 1
First set:

1. "Jack Straw" > (Weir, Hunter) – 6:15
2. "Bertha" (Garcia, Hunter) – 6:59
3. "We Can Run" (Mydland, Barlow) – 6:04
4. "Ramble On Rose" (Garcia, Hunter) – 8:08
5. "When I Paint My Masterpiece" (Dylan) – 6:02
6. "Bird Song" > (Garcia, Hunter) – 13:05 (Note: Previously released on So Many Roads (1965–1995))
7. "Promised Land" (Berry) – 4:46

Disc 2
Second set:

1. "Eyes of the World" > (Garcia, Hunter) – 16:33 (Note: Previously released on Without a Net)
2. "Estimated Prophet" > (Weir, Barlow) – 14:47
3. "Dark Star" > (Garcia, Hart, Kreutzmann, Lesh, Ron McKernan, Weir, Hunter) – 18:19
4. "Drums" > (Hart, Kreutzmann) – 10:22

Disc 3

1. "Space" > (Garcia, Lesh, Mydland, Weir) – 7:53 (Note: Previously excerpted on Infrared Roses)
2. "Dark Star" > (Garcia, Hart, Kreutzmann, Lesh, McKernan, Weir, Hunter) – 2:46
3. "The Wheel" > (Garcia, Hunter) – 4:23
4. "Throwing Stones" > (Weir, Barlow) – 9:25
5. "Turn On Your Lovelight" (Scott, Malone) – 7:41

Encore:

6. "Knockin' on Heaven's Door" (Dylan) – 8:24

=== April 1, 1990 – The Omni, Atlanta, Georgia ===
Disc 1
First set:

1. "Touch of Grey" (Garcia, Hunter) – 6:41
2. "Walkin' Blues" (Robert Johnson, arranged by Weir) – 6:27
3. "Just a Little Light" (Mydland) – 6:12
4. "Candyman" (Garcia, Hunter) – 7:20
5. "Me and My Uncle" > (Phillips) – 3:05
6. "Big River" (Cash) – 5:28
7. "Althea" (Garcia, Hunter) – 8:09
8. "Victim or the Crime" > (Weir, Graham) – 9:55
9. "To Lay Me Down" > (Garcia, Hunter) – 9:24
10. "The Music Never Stopped" (Weir, Barlow) – 7:55

Disc 2
Second set:

1. "China Cat Sunflower" > (Garcia, Hunter) – 5:33 (Note: Previously released on Without a Net)
2. "I Know You Rider" (traditional, arranged by Grateful Dead) – 4:51
3. "Ship of Fools" > (Garcia, Hunter) – 7:50
4. "Man Smart, Woman Smarter" > (Norman Span) – 7:54
5. "Drums" > (Hart, Kreutzmann) – 7:30

Disc 3

1. "Space" > (Garcia, Lesh, Mydland, Weir) – 11:48
2. "Dear Mr. Fantasy" > (Winwood, Wood, Capaldi) – 5:42
3. "Hey Jude" > (Lennon, McCartney) – 2:37
4. "Truckin'" > (Garcia, Lesh, Weir, Hunter) – 7:00
5. "Stella Blue" > (Garcia, Hunter) – 10:21
6. "Sugar Magnolia" (Weir, Hunter) – 9:15

Encore:

7. "It's All Over Now, Baby Blue" (Dylan) – 7:40

=== April 3, 1990 – The Omni, Atlanta, Georgia ===
Disc 1
First set:

1. "Shakedown Street" (Garcia, Hunter) – 12:15
2. "Hell in a Bucket" > (Weir, Mydland, Barlow) – 6:17
3. "Sugaree" (Garcia, Hunter) – 11:24
4. "We Can Run" (Mydland, Barlow) – 6:55
5. "When I Paint My Masterpiece" (Dylan) – 5:17
6. "Row Jimmy" (Garcia) – 10:11
7. "Picasso Moon" (Weir, Bralove, Barlow) – 7:14
8. "Tennessee Jed" > (Garcia, Hunter) – 7:39
9. "Promised Land" (Berry) – 4:42

Disc 2
Second set:

1. "Estimated Prophet" > (Weir, Barlow) – 14:03
2. "Scarlet Begonias" > (Garcia, Hunter) – 6:57
3. "Crazy Fingers" > (Garcia, Hunter) – 8:06
4. "Playing in the Band" > (Weir, Hart, Hunter) – 11:40
5. "Drums" > (Hart, Kreutzmann) – 8:17

Disc 3

1. "Space" > (Garcia, Lesh, Mydland, Weir) – 6:56
2. "I Will Take You Home" > (Mydland) – 4:17
3. "Goin' Down the Road Feeling Bad" > (traditional, arranged by Grateful Dead) – 6:14
4. "Throwing Stones" > (Weir, Barlow) – 8:42
5. "Not Fade Away" (Norman Petty, Charles Hardin) – 7:27

Encore:

6. "We Bid You Goodnight" (traditional, arranged by Grateful Dead) – 3:14
