= Wake Up to Find Out =

2014 album of live performances by Grateful Dead in 1990

Live album by Grateful Dead
- Released: September 9, 2014
- Recorded: March 29, 1990
- Genre: Rock
- Length: 152:06
- Label: Rhino
- Producer: Grateful Dead

Grateful Dead chronology
Spring 1990 (The Other One) (2014)	Wake Up to Find Out (2014)	Dave's Picks Volume 12 (2014)

Wake Up to Find Out is a three-CD live album by the rock band the Grateful Dead. It contains the complete concert recorded on March 29, 1990, at Nassau Coliseum in Uniondale, New York. It was released by Rhino Records on September 9, 2014.

At this concert, jazz saxophonist Branford Marsalis sat in for one song in the first set, and then for the entire second set. The same show was also released on the same day as part of the box set Spring 1990 (The Other One). One of the songs from this performance, "Eyes of the World", was previously released on the album Without a Net.

Wake Up to Find Out was released as a five-disc vinyl LP on April 18, 2015, as part of Record Store Day.

== Concert with Branford Marsalis ==
The March 29, 1990 Grateful Dead concert was the first of several to feature Branford Marsalis as a guest musician. In a 2014 interview with Rolling Stone, Marsalis recalled that Dead bassist Phil Lesh had invited him to play with the band for one song.

I came up for "Bird Song", and after the set was over, I said, 'Thanks for letting me play, guys.' And they're like, 'No, no, stay! Play the second half of the show. We'll do "Dark Star".' That had no significance to me. I'm like, ' "Dark Star"? Okay. What is it?' 'Oh, you're gonna love it. It's free, it's out.' 'Great, I can play out.' They start playing that lick, and the audience goes fucking bananas. Later, I started getting these phone calls on my private number: 'Man, you were great last night. Thanks for getting them to play "Dark Star". They haven't played it in six months.' I'm like, 'Who are these people?'... There was almost nothing [the Grateful Dead] couldn't play—and make the shit sound authentic. When they played a song by The Band or Bob Dylan, they played it with the same spirit as The Band or Dylan. They didn't feel the need to write their own arrangement of it. They were all listeners. There is a point where musicians who establish themselves stop listening to music and start listening to their own rhetoric. The Dead didn't do that. It was obvious in the way they approached a song.

— Branford Marsalis

== Band reaction ==
Branford Marsalis sat in with us ...on that hot Spring ’90 tour, when everything was firing just right and the wheels were fully greased...We brought Branford up for a now-legendary version of "Bird Song" during the first set, and it was so good, that we invited him out for the entire second set. [He] became a friend of ours and he said something about us that I’ll never forget: he said we all had big ears. Coming from a monster jazz guy like that, it was a monster compliment. We may have helped introduce improvisation to rock ’n’ roll, but the jazz cats had been jamming since before Chuck Berry even picked up his first electric guitar. Having Branford validate us like that really meant something to me. He told us that we showed him what's possible within rock ’n’ roll and that playing with us was one of the greatest thrills of his life. That, in turn, was one of the greatest thrills of mine.

— Bill Kreutzmann

== Critical reception ==
Professional ratings
Review scores
Source	Rating
AllMusic	3.5/5 stars
Rolling Stone	4/5 stars

On AllMusic, Fred Thomas said, "After they whip through a bright first set featuring mostly live staples like 'Bertha' and 'Ramble on Rose', Marsalis joins in at the start of the second set for stellar, extended takes on the more exploratory side of the Dead catalog. His airy improvisations on classics like 'Eyes of the World' and 'Dark Star' sound brilliantly natural here, and what's most palpable is the sense of exhilaration and mutual respect between these two forces of sonic trailblazing."

In Rolling Stone, David Fricke wrote, "In the spring of 1990, the Dead's last consistent season of transcendence onstage, there was no bolder display of their improvising empathy than this show at Long Island's Nassau Coliseum... An invitation to saxophonist Branford Marsalis to come jam resulted in legend, as Marsalis spent the whole second set in high, jazzy challenge and exchange with the band... In a history of hot nights, this was especially sweet fire."

== Track listing ==
Disc one
First set:

1. "Jack Straw" (Bob Weir, Robert Hunter) – 6:15 →
2. "Bertha" (Jerry Garcia, Hunter) – 6:59
3. "We Can Run" (Brent Mydland, John Barlow) – 6:04
4. "Ramble On Rose" (Garcia, Hunter) – 8:08
5. "When I Paint My Masterpiece" (Bob Dylan) – 6:02
6. "Bird Song" (Garcia, Hunter) – 13:05 →
7. "Promised Land" (Chuck Berry) – 4:46

Disc two
Second set:

1. "Eyes of the World" (Garcia, Hunter) – 16:33 →
2. "Estimated Prophet" (Weir, Barlow) – 14:47 →
3. "Dark Star" (Garcia, Mickey Hart, Bill Kreutzmann, Phil Lesh, Ron McKernan, Weir, Hunter) – 18:19 →
4. "Drums" (Hart, Kreutzmann) – 10:22

Disc three

1. "Space" (Garcia, Lesh, Weir) – 7:53 →
2. "Dark Star" (Garcia, Hart, Kreutzmann, Lesh, McKernan, Weir, Hunter) – 2:46 →
3. "The Wheel" (Garcia, Hunter, Kreutzmann) – 4:23 →
4. "Throwing Stones" (Weir, Barlow) – 9:25 →
5. "Turn On Your Lovelight" (Joseph Scott, Deadric Malone) – 7:41

Encore:

6. "Knockin' on Heaven's Door" (Dylan) – 8:24

Notes:

- "Bird Song" previously released on So Many Roads (1965–1995)
- "Eyes of the World" previously released on Without a Net
- Excerpts of "Dark Star" and "Space" previously released on Infrared Roses

== Personnel ==
Grateful Dead

- Jerry Garcia – lead guitar, vocals
- Mickey Hart – drums
- Bill Kreutzmann – drums
- Phil Lesh – electric bass, vocals
- Brent Mydland – keyboards, vocals
- Bob Weir – rhythm guitar, vocals

Additional musicians

- Branford Marsalis — saxophone on "Bird Song", entirety of second set and encore

Production

- Produced by Grateful Dead
- Produced for release by David Lemieux
- Executive producer: Mark Pinkus
- Associate producers: Doran Tyson, Ryan Wilson
- Original recordings produced by John Cutler
- Mixing: Jeffrey Norman
- Consulting engineer: Rick Vargas
- Mastering: David Glasser
- File wrangling: Anna Frick
- Tape research: Michael Wesley Johnson
- Illustration: Jessica Dessner
- Photography: Kraig Fox
- Art direction, design: Steve Vance
