= Terrapin Station (Limited Edition) =

Live album by Grateful Dead
- Released: September 30, 1997
- Recorded: March 15, 1990
- Genre: Rock, jam
- Length: 169:18
- Label: Grateful Dead

Grateful Dead chronology
Dick's Picks Volume 8 (1997)	Terrapin Station (Limited Edition) (1997)	Dick's Picks Volume 9 (1997)

Professional ratings
Review scores
Source	Rating
Allmusic	3/5 stars
The Music Box	5/5 stars

Terrapin Station (Limited Edition) is a triple CD live album by the Grateful Dead released in 1997. It was recorded on March 15, 1990—bassist Phil Lesh's 50th birthday—at the Capital Centre in Landover, Maryland, and contained a rare Beatles cover, "Revolution". "Revolution" was a favorite song of Lesh's and had previously been played at his request. It also features the first performance of "Easy to Love You" in almost 10 years. The concert performance from the previous night, recorded at the same venue, can be found on Spring 1990 (The Other One). Likewise, the concert from the following night, at the same venue, is contained on Spring 1990. Additionally, the performances of "Walkin' Blues" and "Althea" from this show can be found on the live compilation album Without a Net. Proceeds from this release were originally planned to support the construction of a multi-media Grateful Dead museum and concert venue; however, the plans fell through and were eventually replaced with Lesh's Terrapin Crossroads restaurant and concert venue.

== Track listing ==
Disc one
First set:

1. "Jack Straw" (Hunter, Weir) – 6:19 →
2. "Sugaree" (Hunter, Garcia) – 11:14
3. "Easy to Love You" (Barlow, Mydland) – 6:32
4. "Walkin' Blues" (Johnson) – 6:12
5. "Althea" (Hunter, Garcia) – 8:32
6. "Just Like Tom Thumb's Blues" (Dylan) – 6:57
7. "Tennessee Jed" (Hunter, Garcia) – 9:17
8. "Cassidy" (Barlow, Weir) – 6:12 →
9. "Don't Ease Me In" (traditional) – 6:02

Disc two
Second set:

1. "China Cat Sunflower" (Hunter, Garcia) – 6:27 →
2. "I Know You Rider" (traditional) – 6:50
3. "Samson and Delilah" (traditional) – 7:07 →
4. "Terrapin Station" (Hunter, Garcia) – 14:23 →
5. "Mock Turtle Jam" (Grateful Dead) – 8:23 →
6. "Drums" (Hart, Kreutzmann) – 6:16 →

Disc three
Second set, continued:

1. "And" (Bob Bralove, Hart, Kreutzmann) – 3:43 →
2. "Space" (Garcia, Lesh, Mydland, Weir) – 10:06 →
3. "I Will Take You Home" (Mydland) – 4:20 →
4. "Wharf Rat" (Hunter, Garcia) – 10:59 →
5. "Throwing Stones" (Barlow, Weir) – 8:59 →
6. "Not Fade Away" (Hardin, Petty) – 9:21

Encore:

7. "Revolution" (Lennon, McCartney) – 5:07

== Personnel ==
Grateful Dead

- Jerry Garcia - lead guitar, vocals
- Mickey Hart - drums, percussion
- Bill Kreutzmann - drums, percussion
- Phil Lesh - bass, vocals
- Brent Mydland - Hammond organ, keyboards, vocals
- Bob Weir - guitar, vocals

Production

- John Cutler - recording
- Amy Finkle - package design
- Kelly & Mouse - package illustration
- Joe Gastwirt - mastering
