= Spring 1990 (album) =

Live album and box set by Grateful Dead
- Released: August 31, 2012
- Recorded: March 16 – April 2, 1990
- Genre: Rock
- Label: Rhino
- Producer: Grateful Dead

Grateful Dead chronology
Dave's Picks Volume 3 (2012)	Spring 1990 (2012)	Spring 1990: So Glad You Made It (2012)

Grateful Dead concert box set chronology
Europe '72: The Complete Recordings (2011)	Spring 1990 (2012)	May 1977 (2013)

Spring 1990 is a live album by the rock band the Grateful Dead. It contains six complete concerts, on 18 CDs—one concert from each venue of their spring 1990 tour. It was released on August 31, 2012.

Spring 1990 was produced as a box set, with a limited edition of 9,000 individually numbered copies. The box includes a 60-page hardcover book of essays and photos, along with memorabilia such as reproductions of the tour program, ticket stubs, and backstage passes.

Speaking of the album in a 2012 interview with Rolling Stone, Bob Weir said, "For my money, this was our hottest era. We couldn't wait to go on tour; we couldn't wait to play because it was really working for us and it was keeping us amused. We had been working together as a unit for a good length of time.... We got comfortable enough in those tunes so that we could do a little exploration, harmonically, rhythmically, whatever. We could go places with them. Everybody has to be way in tune with each other to be able to do that."

Looking back, Bill Kreutzmann said about the tour, "Brent played the best organ I’ve ever heard anybody play. He had the piss and the vinegar in him and he brought it to the table every night. The band, as a whole, had come alive again. Those shows had energy, with thunderbolts of electricity to spare. We didn’t wreck drum sets or smash guitars or dress up in elaborate stage costumes; our shows were always about the music and the music during that period was adventurous. It dared listeners to ride shotgun as we went around hairpin turns, whizzing past ever-changing landscapes. Some nights, I could look out from my perch on the drum riser and see the whole house rocking back and forth in unison, a giant wave of people, and those were the nights you knew it was working."

A companion box set, Spring 1990 (The Other One), was released two years after Spring 1990.

== Concerts ==
Spring 1990 contains the following complete concerts:

- March 16, 1990 – Capital Centre, Landover, Maryland
- March 19, 1990 – Hartford Civic Center, Hartford, Connecticut
- March 22, 1990 – Copps Coliseum, Hamilton, Ontario
- March 26, 1990 – Knickerbocker Arena, Albany, New York
- March 30, 1990 – Nassau Coliseum, Uniondale, New York
- April 2, 1990 – The Omni, Atlanta

The album also includes excerpts from this concert:

- March 24, 1990 – Knickerbocker Arena, Albany, New York

Two tracks from the Copps Coliseum concert were previously released on So Many Roads (1965–1995), and one track from the same concert was previously released on Garcia Plays Dylan. Six tracks from the March 26 Knickerbocker Arena concert were previously released on Dozin' at the Knick. Three tracks from the Nassau Coliseum concert and one from Capital Centre (Let it Grow) were previously released on Without a Net. The combination of the tracks from the March 24 concert at the Knickerbocker Arena with those from the same date released on Dozin' at the Knick, Postcards of the Hanging and Without a Net represent that concert in its entirety.

A concert from the day before the Capital Centre date, recorded at the same venue, was previously released as Terrapin Station (Limited Edition).

The remaining shows from the Spring 1990 tour were later released as Spring 1990 (The Other One).

== Personnel ==
=== Grateful Dead ===
- Jerry Garcia – lead guitar, vocals
- Mickey Hart – drums
- Bill Kreutzmann – drums
- Phil Lesh – electric bass, vocals
- Brent Mydland – keyboards, vocals
- Bob Weir – rhythm guitar, vocals

=== Production ===
- Produced by Grateful Dead
- Compilation produced by David Lemieux
- CD mastering by Jeffrey Norman
- Recorded by John Cutler
- Artwork by Wes Lang

== Track listing ==
=== March 16, 1990 – Capital Centre, Landover, Maryland ===
Disc 1

First set:

1. "Let the Good Times Roll" > (Sam Cooke) – 4:11
2. "Touch of Grey" (Jerry Garcia, Robert Hunter) – 6:28
3. "New Minglewood Blues" (traditional, arranged by Bob Weir) – 7:44
4. "Peggy-O" (traditional, arranged by Grateful Dead) – 6:34
5. "Queen Jane Approximately" (Bob Dylan) – 6:15
6. "Loser" (Garcia, Hunter) – 7:22
7. "Black-Throated Wind" (Bob Weir, John Perry Barlow) – 6:03
8. "Bird Song" (Garcia, Hunter) – 14:23
9. "Blow Away" (Brent Mydland, Barlow) – 12:02

Disc 2

Second set:

1. "Scarlet Begonias" > (Garcia, Hunter) – 11:21
2. "Estimated Prophet" > (Weir, Barlow) – 11:04
3. "Ship Of Fools" > (Garcia, Hunter) – 7:39
4. "Man Smart, Woman Smarter" > (Norman Span) – 6:55
5. "Jam" > (Garcia, Mickey Hart, Bill Kreutzmann, Phil Lesh, Mydland, Weir) – 5:24
6. "Drums" (Hart, Kreutzmann) – 9:37

Disc 3

1. "Space" > (Garcia, Lesh, Mydland, Weir) – 10:42
2. "The Other One" > (Weir, Kreutzmann) – 6:55
3. "Stella Blue" > (Garcia, Hunter) – 8:49
4. "Sugar Magnolia" (Weir, Hunter) – 9:16

Encore:

5. "The Last Time" (Mick Jagger, Keith Richards) – 5:19

=== March 19, 1990 – Hartford Civic Center, Hartford, Connecticut ===
Disc 1

First set:

1. "Hell in a Bucket" > (Weir, Mydland, Barlow) – 6:43
2. "Bertha" (Garcia, Hunter) – 7:10
3. "We Can Run" (Mydland, Barlow) – 7:05
4. "Jack-a-Roe" (traditional, arranged by Grateful Dead) – 5:13
5. "Picasso Moon" (Weir, Bob Bralove, Barlow) – 7:41
6. "Brown-Eyed Women" (Garcia, Hunter) – 5:59
7. "It's All Over Now" > (Bobby Womack, Shirley Womack) – 7:25
8. "Deal" (Garcia, Hunter) – 8:41

Disc 2

Second set:

1. "Box of Rain" (Lesh, Hunter) – 5:27
2. "Foolish Heart" > (Garcia, Hunter) – 11:35
3. "Playing in the Band" > (Weir, Hart, Hunter) – 8:32
4. "Eyes of the World" > (Garcia, Hunter) – 14:41
5. "Drums" (Hart, Kreutzmann) – 10:26

Disc 3

1. "Space" > (Garcia, Lesh, Mydland, Weir) – 10:52
2. "China Doll" > (Garcia, Hunter) – 6:13
3. "Gimme Some Lovin'" > (Steve Winwood, Spencer Davis, Muff Winwood) – 4:31
4. "Goin' Down the Road Feeling Bad" > (traditional, arranged by Grateful Dead) – 6:55
5. "Around and Around" (Chuck Berry) – 6:36

Encore:

6. "Brokedown Palace" (Garcia, Hunter) – 5:48

=== March 22, 1990 – Copps Coliseum, Hamilton, Ontario ===
Disc 1

First set:

1. "Feel Like A Stranger" (Weir, Barlow) – 8:12
2. "West L.A. Fadeaway" (Garcia, Hunter) – 7:41
3. "Easy to Love You" (Mydland, Barlow) – 6:14
4. "Beat It On Down the Line" (Jesse Fuller) – 3:34
5. "It Must Have Been the Roses" (Hunter) – 6:29
6. "The Last Time" (Jagger, Richards) – 5:40
7. "Picasso Moon" (Weir, Bralove, Barlow) – 7:07
8. "Don't Ease Me In" (traditional, arranged by Grateful Dead) – 3:30

Disc 2

Second set:

1. "Scarlet Begonias" > (Garcia, Hunter) – 8:30 (Note: Previously released on So Many Roads (1965–1995))
2. "Fire on the Mountain" (Hart, Hunter) – 11:44
3. "Samson and Delilah" (traditional, arranged by Bob Weir) – 6:51
4. "Believe It or Not" (Garcia, Hunter) – 6:32
5. "Truckin'" > (Garcia, Lesh, Weir, Hunter) – 11:04
6. "Drums" (Hart, Kreutzmann) – 11:36

Disc 3

1. "Space" > (Garcia, Lesh, Mydland, Weir) – 8:14
2. "The Other One" > (Weir, Kreutzmann) – 6:42
3. "Hey Jude" > (John Lennon, Paul McCartney) – 4:53
4. "Dear Mr. Fantasy" > (Steve Winwood, Chris Wood, Jim Capaldi) – 3:58
5. "Hey Jude" > (Lennon, McCartney) – 4:31
6. "Sugar Magnolia" (Weir, Hunter) – 8:45

Encore:

7. "It's All Over Now, Baby Blue" (Dylan) – 7:10 (Note: Previously released on Garcia Plays Dylan)

=== March 26, 1990 – Knickerbocker Arena, Albany, New York ===
Disc 1

First set:

1. "Hell in a Bucket" (Weir, Mydland, Barlow) – 6:53 (Note: Previously released on Dozin' at the Knick)
2. "Dupree's Diamond Blues" (Garcia, Hunter) – 6:08
3. "Just a Little Light" (Mydland, Barlow) – 5:15
4. "Black-Throated Wind" (Weir, Barlow) – 6:32
5. "Big Railroad Blues" (Noah Lewis) – 4:40
6. "Picasso Moon" (Weir, Bralove, Barlow) – 7:17
7. "Row Jimmy" (Garcia, Hunter) – 10:53
8. "Blow Away" (Mydland, Barlow) – 11:31

Disc 2

Second set:

1. "Built to Last" (Garcia, Hunter) – 5:29
2. "Victim or the Crime" > (Weir, Gerrit Graham) – 9:56
3. "China Cat Sunflower" > (Garcia, Hunter) – 5:45
4. "I Know You Rider" > (traditional, arranged by Grateful Dead) – 5:24
5. "Man Smart, Woman Smarter" > (Span) – 6:14
6. "Drums" (Hart, Kreutzmann) – 11:21

Disc 3

1. "Space" > (Garcia, Lesh, Mydland, Weir) – 8:29
2. "I Need a Miracle" > (Weir, Barlow) – 4:03
3. "Dear Mr. Fantasy" > (S. Winwood, Wood, Capaldi) – 5:20
4. "Gimme Some Lovin'" > (S. Winwood, Davis, M. Winwood) – 5:09
5. "Morning Dew" (Bonnie Dobson, Tim Rose) – 11:57

Encore:

6. "Brokedown Palace" (Garcia, Hunter) – 5:37

Bonus tracks – March 24, 1990 – Knickerbocker Arena:

7. "Let the Good Times Roll" > (Cooke) – 4:01
8. "Help on the Way" > (Garcia, Hunter) – 4:05
9. "Slipknot!" > (Garcia, Keith Godchaux, Kreutzmann, Lesh, Weir) – 3:50
10. "Franklin's Tower" (Garcia, Kreutzmann, Hunter) – 8:04
11. "Loser" (Garcia, Hunter) – 7:30
12. "Tennessee Jed" (Garcia, Hunter) – 7:53

=== March 30, 1990 – Nassau Coliseum, Uniondale, New York ===
Disc 1

First set:

1. "Help on the Way" > (Garcia, Hunter) – 4:12 (Note: Previously released on Without a Net)
2. "Slipknot!" > (Garcia, K. Godchaux, Kreutzmann, Lesh, Weir) – 5:49
3. "Franklin's Tower" (Garcia, Kreutzmann, Hunter) – 9:39
4. "Little Red Rooster" (Willie Dixon) – 9:13
5. "Dire Wolf" (Garcia, Hunter) – 3:28
6. "It's All Over Now" (B. Womack, S. Womack) – 7:18
7. "Just Like Tom Thumb's Blues" (Dylan) – 6:12
8. "Picasso Moon" (Weir, Bralove, Barlow) – 7:56
9. "Don't Ease Me In" (traditional, arranged by Grateful Dead) – 3:26

Disc 2

Second set:

1. "Iko Iko" (James Crawford) – 7:07
2. "Playing in the Band" > (Weir, Hart, Hunter) – 9:19
3. "China Doll" > (Garcia, Hunter) – 5:41
4. "Uncle John's Band" > (Garcia, Hunter) – 8:16
5. "Terrapin Station" > (Garcia, Hunter) – 12:59
6. "Drums" (Hart, Kreutzmann) – 9:48

Disc 3

1. "Space" > (Garcia, Lesh, Mydland, Weir) – 11:30 (Note: Previously excerpted for title track of Infrared Roses)
2. "I Need a Miracle" > (Weir, Barlow) – 4:02
3. "Gimme Some Lovin" > (S. Winwood, Davis, M. Winwood) – 4:55
4. "Standing on the Moon" (Garcia, Hunter) > – 8:56
5. "Not Fade Away" (Norman Petty, Charles Hardin) – 7:40

Encore:

6. "Attics of My Life" (Garcia, Hunter) – 5:12

=== April 2, 1990 – The Omni, Atlanta, Georgia ===
Disc 1

First set:

1. "Feel Like a Stranger" (Weir, Barlow) – 8:44
2. "Mississippi Half-Step Uptown Toodeloo" > (Garcia, Hunter) – 7:02
3. "The Weight" (Robbie Robertson) – 6:34
4. "Queen Jane Approximately" (Dylan) – 6:13
5. "Easy to Love You" (Mydland, Barlow) – 5:37
6. "Brown-Eyed Women" (Garcia, Hunter) – 5:46
7. "Let It Grow" (Weir, Barlow) – 12:21

Disc 2

Second set:

1. "Foolish Heart" > (Garcia, Hunter) – 9:20
2. "Looks Like Rain" > (Weir, Barlow) – 8:26
3. "He's Gone" > (Garcia, Hunter) – 8:59
4. "The Last Time" > (Jagger, Richards) – 5:43
5. "Drums" (Hart, Kreutzmann) – 10:42

Disc 3

1. "Space" > (Garcia, Lesh, Mydland, Weir) – 9:04
2. "The Other One" > (Weir, Kreutzmann) – 6:24
3. "Death Don't Have No Mercy" > (Reverend Gary Davis) – 7:37
4. "Around and Around" > (Berry) – 3:41
5. "Good Lovin'" (Arthur Resnick, Rudy Clark) – 7:12

Encore:

6. "Black Muddy River" (Garcia, Hunter) – 6:28
