= Spring 1990: So Glad You Made It =

Live album by Grateful Dead
- Released: September 18, 2012
- Recorded: March 16–30, 1990
- Genre: Rock
- Length: 153:36
- Label: Rhino
- Producer: Grateful Dead

Grateful Dead chronology
Spring 1990 (2012)	Spring 1990: So Glad You Made It (2012)	Dave's Picks Volume 4 (2012)

Spring 1990: So Glad You Made It is a two-CD live album by the rock band the Grateful Dead. It was recorded in March 1990, and contains selections from the band's 18-CD box set Spring 1990. It was released on September 18, 2012.

== Critical reception ==
Professional ratings
Review scores
Source	Rating
Allmusic	3.5/5 stars

On AllMusic, Fred Thomas said, "Some seasoned Deadheads consider the 1990 spring tour to be one of the best of the band's legendary live history, citing consistently strong shows and a renewed sense of fire. Certainly by this point, their musicianship was second nature, and set lists on this tour were more inspired and fluid than on weaker tours. The song selection on So Glad You Made It emphasizes how tuned-in the sets were, with a wide cross section of crowd favorites like "Playing in the Band", later-period compositions like "West L.A. Fadeaway", and deep jams on songs like "Eyes of the World" and "Bird Song". Beginning with a playful take on Sam Cooke's "Good Times", the scene is set for impassioned performances and full-hearted playing from the band."

== Track listing ==
Disc 1
No.	Title	Recording venue and date	Length
1.	"Good Times >" (Sam Cooke)	Capital Centre, March 16, 1990	4:00
2.	"Feel Like a Stranger" (Bob Weir, John Perry Barlow)	Copps Coliseum, March 22, 1990	7:32
3.	"West L.A. Fadeaway" (Jerry Garcia, Robert Hunter)	Copps Coliseum, March 22, 1990	7:33
4.	"Easy to Love You" (Brent Mydland, Barlow)	Copps Coliseum, March 22, 1990	5:58
5.	"Beat It On Down the Line" (Jesse Fuller)	Copps Coliseum, March 22, 1990	3:19
6.	"Loser" (Garcia, Hunter)	Knickerbocker Arena, March 24, 1990	7:31
7.	"It's All Over Now >" (Bobby Womack, Shirley Womack)	Hartford Civic Center, March 19, 1990	7:30
8.	"Jack-a-Roe" (traditional, arranged by Grateful Dead)	Hartford Civic Center, March 19, 1990	5:00
9.	"The Last Time" (Mick Jagger, Keith Richards)	Copps Coliseum, March 22, 1990	5:14
10.	"Bird Song" (Garcia, Hunter)	Capital Centre, March 16, 1990	14:04
11.	"Blow Away" (Mydland, Barlow)	Capital Centre, March 16, 1990	11:58

Disc 2
No.	Title	Recording venue and date	Length
1.	"Samson and Delilah" (traditional, arranged by Grateful Dead)	Copps Coliseum, March 22, 1990	6:59
2.	"Scarlet Begonias >" (Garcia, Hunter)	Capital Centre, March 16, 1990	11:11
3.	"Estimated Prophet >" (Weir, Barlow)	Capital Centre, March 16, 1990	10:57
4.	"Playing in the Band >" (Weir, Mickey Hart, Hunter)	Hartford Civic Center, March 19, 1990	8:30
5.	"Eyes of the World" (Garcia, Hunter)	Hartford Civic Center, March 19, 1990	14:50
6.	"Gimme Some Lovin' >" (Steve Winwood, Spencer Davis, Muff Winwood)	Knickerbocker Arena, March 26, 1990	5:09
7.	"Morning Dew" (Bonnie Dobson, Tim Rose)	Knickerbocker Arena, March 26, 1990	11:13
8.	"Not Fade Away" (Norman Petty, Charles Hardin)	Nassau Coliseum, March 30, 1990	5:51
9.	"Attics of My Life" (Garcia, Hunter)	Nassau Coliseum, March 30, 1990	5:08

== Personnel ==
=== Grateful Dead ===
- Jerry Garcia – lead guitar, vocals
- Mickey Hart – drums
- Bill Kreutzmann – drums
- Phil Lesh – electric bass, vocals
- Brent Mydland – keyboards, vocals
- Bob Weir – rhythm guitar, vocals

=== Production ===
- Produced by Grateful Dead
- Produced for release by David Lemieux
- Executive producer: Mark Pinkus
- Associate producer: Doran Tyson
- Recorded and mixed live by John Cutler
- CD mastering by Jeffrey Norman
- Quotation in "A Brief History" by Lenny Kaye
- Original art: Wes Lang
- Photos: James R. Anderson, Michael H. Laurentus Sr.
- Art direction and design: Steve Vance
- Liner notes: David Lemieux
