= Dave's Picks Volume 55 =

Live album by the rock band Grateful Dead

Live album by Grateful Dead
- Released: July 25, 2025
- Recorded: October 28, 1990
- Venue: Le Zénith
- Genre: Rock
- Length: 222:26
- Label: Rhino
- Producer: Grateful Dead

Grateful Dead chronology
Gratest Hits (2025)	Dave's Picks Volume 55 (2025)	Blues for Allah: The Angel's Share (2025)

Dave's Picks Volume 55 is a three-CD live album by the rock band the Grateful Dead. It contains a recording of the complete concert performed on October 28, 1990, at Le Zénith in Paris, France. It also includes bonus songs recorded at a concert two nights later at Wembley Arena in London, England. It was released on July 25, 2025, in a limited edition of 25,000 copies.

In October and November 1990 the Grateful Dead performed an 11-concert European tour, with shows in Sweden, Germany, France, and England.

From September 1990 to March 1992, the lineup of the band included two keyboardists – Vince Welnick and Bruce Hornsby. Volume 55 is the first in the Dave's Picks series to feature Welnick and Hornsby.

The show from the previous date was released in 2015 in the 30 Trips Around the Sun box set.

== Critical reception ==
On AllMusic, Timothy Monger said, "The newly developing Vince-Bruce interplay makes this one special, as does a Dylan two-fer ("Maggie's Farm" and "Knockin' on Heaven's Door") and other highlights like "Touch of Grey", "Looks Like Rain", and the Hornsby cut "Stander on the Mountain"."

== Track listing ==
Disc 1

October 28, 1990 – Le Zénith – first set:

1. "Touch of Grey" > (Jerry Garcia, Robert Hunter) – 7:40
2. "Walkin' Blues" (traditional, arranged by Grateful Dead) – 7:21
3. "Candyman" (Garcia, Hunter) – 7:11
4. "Box of Rain" (Phil Lesh, Hunter) – 5:39
5. "Mexicali Blues" > (Bob Weir, John Perry Barlow) – 5:22
6. "Maggie's Farm" (Bob Dylan) – 5:53
7. "Althea" (Garcia, Hunter) – 7:31
8. "Cassidy" (Weir, Barlow) – 6:55
9. "Tennessee Jed" (Garcia, Hunter) – 8:11
10. "Stander on the Mountain" (Bruce Hornsby) – 7:15

Disc 2

October 28, 1990 – Le Zénith – second set:

1. "Victim or the Crime" > (Weir, Gerrit Graham) – 8:49
2. "Eyes of the World" > (Garcia, Hunter) – 10:41
3. "Estimated Prophet" > (Weir, Barlow) – 10:14
4. "Uncle John's Band" > (Garcia, Hunter) – 8:56
5. "Drums" (Mickey Hart, Bill Kreutzmann) – 11:53

October 30, 1990 – Wembley Arena – bonus tracks:

6. "Let It Grow" > (Weir, Barlow) – 12:56
7. "Jam" > (Grateful Dead) – 5:00
8. "Valley Road" (Hornsby) – 5:02

Disc 3

October 28, 1990 – Le Zénith – second set, continued:

1. "Space" > (Garcia, Lesh, Weir) – 7:38
2. "The Other One" > (Weir, Kreutzmann) – 7:45
3. "Wharf Rat" > (Garcia, Hunter) – 8:28
4. "Sugar Magnolia" (Weir, Hunter) – 9:18

October 28, 1990 – Le Zénith – encore:

5. "Knockin' on Heaven's Door" (Dylan) – 8:13

October 30, 1990 – Wembley Arena – bonus tracks:

6. "Picasso Moon" > (Weir, Barlow, Bob Bralove) – 7:02
7. "Foolish Heart" > (Garcia, Hunter) – 8:53
8. "Looks Like Rain" > (Weir, Barlow) – 8:28
9. "Terrapin Station" (Garcia, Hunter) – 14:08

== Personnel ==
Grateful Dead

- Jerry Garcia – guitar, vocals
- Mickey Hart – drums
- Bruce Hornsby – piano, accordion, vocals
- Bill Kreutzmann – drums
- Phil Lesh – bass, vocals
- Bob Weir – guitar, vocals
- Vince Welnick – keyboards, vocals

Production

- Produced by Grateful Dead
- Produced for release by David Lemieux
- Executive producer: Mark Pinkus
- Associate producer: Ivette Ramos
- Recording: Dan Healy
- Mastering: Jeffrey Norman
- Art direction, design: Steve Vance
- Cover art: James Mazza
- Photos: John Laatunen
- Liner notes: David Lemieux

== Charts ==
Chart performance for Dave's Picks Volume 55
Chart (2025)	Peak position
US Billboard 200	28
US Top Rock & Alternative Albums (Billboard)	6
