= Brent Mydland =

American keyboardist, songwriter and singer (1952–1990)

- Brent Mydland in 1987

Background information
- Born: October 21, 1952; Munich, West Germany
- Origin: Concord, California, U.S.
- Died: July 26, 1990 (aged 37) Lafayette, California, U.S.
- Genres: Rock; jam; blues; gospel; country; boogie woogie; psychedelia
- Occupations: Musician, songwriter
- Instruments: Keyboards, vocals
- Years active: 1971–1990
- Labels: Warner Bros. Arista

Brent Mydland (October 21, 1952 – July 26, 1990) was an American keyboardist, songwriter and singer. He was a member of the rock band the Grateful Dead from 1979 until his death in 1990, a longer tenure than any other keyboardist in the band.

Growing up in Concord, California, Mydland took up music while in elementary school. After graduation, he played with a number of bands and recorded one album with Silver before joining Bobby and the Midnites with Bob Weir and jazz veterans Billy Cobham and Alphonso Johnson. This led to an invitation to join the Dead in 1979, replacing Keith Godchaux. Mydland quickly became an important member in the Dead, using a variety of keyboards including Hammond organ and various synthesizers and singing regularly. He wrote several songs on the band's studio albums released while he was a member.

In between touring, mid summer 1990, Mydland died of an accidental drug overdose.

== Biography ==
=== Early life ===
Born in Munich, Germany, the child of a Norwegian U.S. Army chaplain, Mydland moved to San Francisco with his parents at the age of one. Mydland spent most of his childhood in Concord, California. He started piano lessons at age six and had formal classical lessons through his junior year in high school. In an interview he commented that "My sister took lessons and it looked fun to me, so I did too. There was always a piano around the house and I wanted to play it. When I couldn't play it I would beat on it anyway." His mother, a graveyard shift nurse, encouraged Mydland's talents by insisting that he practice his music two hours each day. He played trumpet from elementary till his senior year in high school; his schoolmates remember him practicing on an accordion, as well as the piano, every day after school.

Mydland played trumpet in the school's marching band, but was dismissed for having long hair. He graduated from Liberty High School, Brentwood, California, in 1971.

=== Pre-Grateful Dead ===
Mydland began playing rock'n'roll with friends in high school (Liberty High School), and was influenced by organists such as Lee Michaels, Ray Manzarek and Steppenwolf's Goldy McJohn. He became a fan of the Grateful Dead in the late 1960s, though was less impressed by their 1970s material.

After graduation, Mydland lived in a quonset hut in Thousand Oaks, California, writing songs. He joined a band with Rick Carlos, who was invited by John Batdorf of Batdorf & Rodney to join their band. Mydland was asked to join shortly after. He then formed the band Silver with Batdorf, releasing one album on Arista Records.

Mydland then got in touch with Bob Weir via a connection from Batdorf & Rodney, and joined Weir's side project Bobby and the Midnites as keyboardist and backing vocalist.

=== Grateful Dead ===
Mydland joined the Grateful Dead in April 1979, replacing Keith and Donna Godchaux, who had decided to start their own band. After two weeks of rehearsals, he played his first concert with the band at the Spartan Stadium, San Jose, on April 22.

Mydland quickly became an integral part of the Dead owing to his vocal and songwriting skills as much as his keyboard playing. He quickly combined his tenor singing with founding members Weir and Jerry Garcia to provide strong three-part harmonies on live favorites. He easily fit into the band's sound and added his own contributions, such as in Go to Heaven (1980) which featured two of Mydland's songs, "Far From Me" and "Easy to Love You", the latter written with frequent Weir collaborator John Perry Barlow. On the next album, In the Dark (1987), Mydland co-wrote "Hell in a Bucket" with Weir and Barlow; he also penned the train song "Tons of Steel".

Built to Last (1989) featured several more of Mydland's songs: the moody "Just a Little Light", the environmental song "We Can Run", the live-performance-driven "Blow Away" and the poignant "I Will Take You Home", a lullaby written with Barlow for Mydland's two daughters.

Mydland wrote several other songs that were played live but not released on any studio albums, including "Don't Need Love", "Never Trust A Woman", "Maybe You Know", "Only a Fool", all written solo, and "Gentlemen Start Your Engines", with Barlow. Many of these were intended for a solo album that was started but never completed, along with "Love Doesn't Have to be Pretty", performed live solo, but not with the Grateful Dead. He also co-wrote "Revolutionary Hamstrung Blues" with Phil Lesh and Lesh's lyrical collaborator Bobby Petersen, although the song was performed live only once.

His high, gravelly vocal harmonies and emotional leads added to the band's singing strength, and he even occasionally incorporated scat singing into his solos. Monty Byrom, guitarist on Mydland's unreleased solo album, said Mydland was "one of the most talented guys I've ever met. I've never seen anybody that could sing with those kind of notes, night after night. He was a cross between Gregg Allman and Howlin' Wolf. It was crazy." Mydland's vocals added color to old favorites such as "Cassidy", "Mississippi Half-Step Uptown Toodeloo", "Ramble on Rose", the Band's "The Weight", and he even wrote his own verse for Willie Dixon's "Little Red Rooster". He sang lead on many covers, including Traffic's "Dear Mr. Fantasy", the Beatles' "Hey Jude", the Meters' "Hey Pocky Way", and, with Lesh, the Spencer Davis Group's "Gimme Some Lovin'".

Mydland's last show with the Grateful Dead was on July 23, 1990, at the World Music Theater, in Tinley Park, Illinois.

In 1994, he was inducted into the Rock and Roll Hall of Fame as a member of the Grateful Dead.

==== Equipment ====
While Keith Godchaux had preferred to play only piano at concerts, Mydland was keen to experiment with different electronic keyboards and synthesizers and frequently changed his setup to add new sounds. He played several different electric pianos and synthesizers throughout his tenure. Upon joining the band in 1979, his piano sounds came from a Fender Rhodes. In 1982, he switched to a Yamaha CP-70 electric grand, though he only used it for about one year. During this time he also used analog synthesizers including a Minimoog, and a Sequential Circuits Prophet-5. In 1983, he replaced his analog synthesizers and electric piano with a Yamaha GS-1 digital piano. The GS-1 is an extremely rare synthesizer, with only about 100 ever produced. In the mid-eighties, he also added an E-mu Emulator II to his rig.

In mid 1987, Mydland's synthesizer setup changed once again. Bob Bralove had been hired by the Grateful Dead to program and maintain new MIDI systems. The GS-1 and Emulator II were replaced by a new Kurzweil MIDIboard MIDI controller, which gave Mydland the ability to use voices from an array of different synthesizer modules, and blend them together using volume pedals and foot switches. The MIDIboard, like the GS-1 it replaced, was capable of polyphonic aftertouch, a relatively rare feature in MIDI controllers. The synthesizer racks included a Roland MKS-20 digital piano, a Kurzweil 250RMX (the rack-mounted version of the famous Kurzweil K250 synthesizer), a Roland S550 sampler, an Oberheim Matrix 1000, a Lexicon PCM41 digital delay, a Lexicon PCM70 reverb/effects processor, and an Akai MPX820 mixing board. A Roland D-50 keyboard was added in the fall of 1987, and a Korg M1 keyboard was added in the fall of 1989 after experimenting with the M1R module version on the 1989 summer tour. These keyboards could be controlled through the MIDIboard, or could be played independently.

Mydland also regularly played the Hammond organ, and had a B-3 with ten modified Leslie speakers in his setup for his entire tenure. The Grateful Dead purchased three B-3 organs for his use when he joined the band, and he personally owned several B-3 organs at the time of his death. The B-3 he played for the majority of his tenure with the Grateful Dead, known for once being covered with stickers, is currently used by keyboardist Jeff Chimenti during live performances. It was present at the 50th anniversary Fare Thee Well concerts in July 2015.

=== Other work ===
In 1982, he recorded and mastered a solo studio album, but it was never released.

In the summer of 1985, he performed with Dead drummer Bill Kreutzmann in their band Kokomo along with 707's Kevin Russell and Santana's David Margen.

In 1985, he performed at the Haight Street Fair with Weir, John Cipollina, and Merl Saunders, among others.

In 1986, Mydland formed Go Ahead with several San Francisco Bay area musicians, including Bill Kreutzmann, also former Santana members Alex Ligertwood on vocals and David Margen on bass, as well as guitarist Jerry Cortez. The band toured during the time Jerry Garcia was recovering from a diabetic coma, and also briefly reunited in 1988.

In 1988, Mydland performed at the Bay Area Music Awards, sharing an organ with Merl Saunders and performing alongside Jerry Garcia, Bob Weir, John Fogerty, and others.

He also did numerous solo projects and performances, as well as duo performances with Bob Weir numerous times throughout the 1980s, with Weir on acoustic guitar and Mydland on grand piano.

=== Death ===
Brent Mydland died at his home in Lafayette, California, on July 26, 1990, three days after completing the Grateful Dead's summer tour. An autopsy conducted by the Contra Costa Coroner's office revealed that Mydland had died of acute cocaine and morphine intoxication. Richard Rainey, Contra Costa County coroner, stated that "Toxicology tests reveal lethal levels of morphine and cocaine in the blood", a mixture "commonly referred to as a 'speedball'." He was the third Dead keyboardist to die (after founding member Ron "Pigpen" McKernan in 1973 and Keith Godchaux in 1980); Garcia said Mydland's death was "crushing" and it abruptly closed a chapter of the band's career.

Mydland is buried at Oakmont Memorial Park in Lafayette, California.

=== Legacy ===
Weir has said that the late '80s and early '90s with Mydland was his favorite time playing in the band.

David Gans has described Mydland as "a talented synthesist [sic], who was able to play all this beautiful synthesized string stuff, but he could still kick ass and take names on the Hammond organ."

Mydland's younger daughter, Jennifer Mydland, is an aspiring singer-songwriter.

== Discography ==
=== With the Grateful Dead ===
- Go to Heaven – 1980
- Reckoning – 1981
- Dead Set – 1981
- In the Dark – 1987
- Dylan & the Dead – 1989
- Built to Last – 1989
- Without a Net – 1990
- Infrared Roses –1991
- Grayfolded – 1994
- Dick's Picks Volume 5 – 1996
- Dozin' at the Knick – 1996
- Dick's Picks Volume 6 – 1996
- Terrapin Station – 1997
- Fallout from the Phil Zone – 1997
- Dick's Picks Volume 13 – 1999
- View from the Vault – 2000
- Dick's Picks Volume 21 – 2001
- Nightfall of Diamonds – 2001
- Postcards of the Hanging – March 2002
- View from the Vault III – 2002
- Go to Nassau – 2002
- View from the Vault IV – 2003
- Dick's Picks Volume 32 – 2004
- Truckin' Up to Buffalo – 2005
- Road Trips Volume 1 Number 1 – 2007
- Road Trips Volume 3 Number 1 – 2009
- Crimson White & Indigo – 2010
- Road Trips Volume 3 Number 4 – 2010
- Formerly the Warlocks – 2010
- Road Trips Volume 4 Number 2 – 2011
- Road Trips Volume 4 Number 4 – 2011
- Spring 1990 – 2012
- Spring 1990: So Glad You Made It – 2012
- Dave's Picks Volume 8 – 2013
- Live at Hampton Coliseum – 2014
- Spring 1990 (The Other One) – 2014
- Wake Up to Find Out – 2014
- 30 Trips Around the Sun – 2015
- 30 Trips Around the Sun: The Definitive Live Story 1965–1995 – 2015
- Dave's Picks Volume 20 – 2016
- Robert F. Kennedy Stadium, Washington, D.C., July 12 & 13, 1989 – 2017
- Dave's Picks Volume 27 – 2018
- The Warfield, San Francisco, California, October 9 & 10, 1980 – 2019
- Dave's Picks Volume 31 – 2019
- Giants Stadium 1987, 1989, 1991 – 2019
- Saint of Circumstance – 2019
- Dave's Picks Volume 35 – 2020
- Dave's Picks Volume 36 – 2020
- Dave's Picks Volume 39 – 2021
- Dave's Picks Volume 40 – 2021
- In and Out of the Garden: Madison Square Garden '81, '82, '83 – 2022
- Madison Square Garden, New York, NY 3/9/81 – 2022
- Dave's Picks Volume 44 – 2022
- Dave's Picks Volume 47 – 2023
- Dave's Picks Volume 49 – 2024
- Dave's Picks Volume 52 – 2024
- Enjoying the Ride – 2025
- The Music Never Stopped – 2025
- Gratest Hits – 2025
- Dave's Picks Volume 56 – 2025
- Summer Magic 1985 – 2026
- Merriweather 6/30/85 – 2026
- Dave's Picks Volume 60 – 2026

=== With other artists ===
- Silver – Silver – 1976
- Sweet Surprise – Eric Andersen – 1976
- Bobby and the Midnites – Bobby and the Midnites – 1981
- A Wing and a Prayer – Matt Kelly – 1985
- Down in the Groove – Bob Dylan – 1988
- New Frontier – New Frontier – 1988
