= Formerly the Warlocks =

Live album and box set by Grateful Dead
- Released: September 7, 2010
- Recorded: October 8–9, 1989
- Genre: Rock
- Length: 327:23
- Label: Grateful Dead
- Producer: David Lemieux

Grateful Dead chronology
Road Trips Volume 3 Number 4 (2010)	Formerly the Warlocks (2010)	The Warner Bros. Studio Albums (2010)

Grateful Dead concert box set chronology
Winterland June 1977: The Complete Recordings (2009)	Formerly the Warlocks (2010)	Europe '72: The Complete Recordings (2011)

Formerly the Warlocks is a live album by the rock band the Grateful Dead. Packaged as a box set, it contains two complete concerts on six CDs. It was recorded on October 8 and 9, 1989, at the Hampton Coliseum in Hampton, Virginia. It was released on September 7, 2010.

== The Hampton "Warlocks" concerts ==
For the 1989 Hampton Coliseum shows, the band wanted to maintain a low profile, so the venue was not included as part of the regular ticket sale for the East Coast fall tour. Instead, tickets went on sale at local outlets ten days before the concerts, with the band billed as "Formerly the Warlocks" instead of the Grateful Dead. When the band came to town, the marquee of the Coliseum read "The Warlocks", which had been the Grateful Dead's original name for a few months in 1965.

The two concerts featured several songs that the band had not played live for some time. They had not performed "Help on the Way" since 1985, "Dark Star" since 1984, and "Attics of My Life" since 1972.

In a 1993 poll of Grateful Dead tape traders, the October 9, 1989 show was ranked number 4 on the list of all-time favorite Dead concert tapes, and the October 8 show also appeared on the list.

== The album ==
The 1989 Hampton concerts were recorded on 24-track analog tapes. The album was created by digitally remixing the original tapes into HDCD format. This provides enhanced sound quality when played on CD players with HDCD technology, and is fully compatible with conventional CD players.

Formerly the Warlocks is packaged in a wooden box reminiscent of a cigar box. In addition to the six CDs, it contains an accordion-fold booklet with liner notes and photos of the concerts. It also includes a photo of the Hampton Coliseum marquee listing the band as "The Warlocks", a Hampton Coliseum postcard with the set list of the second show, and a Grateful Dead Halloween themed button. Additionally, it contains reproductions of tickets to both concerts, a handout of information for concert attendees, and an article about the Grateful Dead from the October 22, 1989 edition of The Charlotte Observer.

== Track listing ==
Disc one
October 8, 1989 – First set:

1. "Foolish Heart" (Jerry Garcia, Robert Hunter) – 8:00
2. "Walkin' Blues" (Robert Johnson) – 7:41
3. "Candyman" (Garcia, Hunter) – 7:29
4. "Me and My Uncle" > (John Philips) – 3:11
5. "Big River" (Johnny Cash) – 6:47
6. "Stagger Lee" (Garcia, Hunter) – 5:58
7. "Queen Jane Approximately" (Bob Dylan) – 6:53
8. "Bird Song" (Garcia, Hunter) – 13:24
9. "Promised Land" (Chuck Berry) – 4:57

Disc two
October 8, 1989 – Second set:

1. "Help on the Way" > (Garcia, Hunter) – 4:44
2. "Slipknot!" > (Garcia, Keith Godchaux, Mickey Hart, Bill Kreutzmann, Phil Lesh, Bob Weir) – 4:54
3. "Franklin's Tower" (Garcia, Kreutzmann, Hunter) – 8:26
4. "Victim or the Crime" > (Weir, Gerrit Graham) – 8:30
5. "Eyes of the World" > (Garcia, Hunter) – 9:08
6. "Rhythm Devils" > (Hart, Kreutzmann) – 10:44

Disc three

1. "Space" > (Garcia, Lesh, Weir) – 8:44
2. "I Need a Miracle" > (Weir, John Perry Barlow) – 5:01
3. "The Wheel" > (Garcia, Hunter) – 4:13
4. "Gimme Some Lovin'" > (Steve Winwood, Spencer Davis, Muff Winwood) – 4:31
5. "Morning Dew" (Bonnie Dobson, Tim Rose) – 13:24

October 8, 1989 – Encore:

6. "And We Bid You Goodnight" (traditional) – 3:55

Disc four
October 9, 1989 – First set:

1. "Feel Like a Stranger" (Weir, Barlow) – 8:16 (Note: Previously released on Without a Net)
2. "Built to Last" (Garcia, Hunter) – 5:03
3. "Little Red Rooster" (Willie Dixon) – 9:09
4. "Ramble On Rose" (Garcia, Hunter) – 7:53
5. "We Can Run" (Brent Mydland, Barlow) – 6:31
6. "Jack-a-Roe" (traditional) – 4:37
7. "Stuck Inside of Mobile with the Memphis Blues Again (Dylan) – 10:10
8. "Row Jimmy" (Garcia, Hunter) – 11:08
9. "The Music Never Stopped" (Weir, Barlow) – 8:15

Notes

Disc five
October 9, 1989 – Second set:

1. "Playing in the Band" > (Weir, Hart, Hunter) – 11:23 (Note: Garcia plays a few bars of "Teddy Bears' Picnic" at the start)
2. "Uncle John's Band" > (Garcia, Hunter) – 11:58
3. "Playing in the Band" > (Weir, Hart, Hunter) – 2:20
4. "Dark Star" > (Garcia, Hart, Kreutzmann, Lesh, Ron McKernan, Weir, Hunter) – 19:22
5. "Rhythm Devils" > (Hart, Kreutzmann) – 9:55

Notes

Disc six

1. "Space" > (Garcia, Lesh, Weir) – 7:26 (Note: Previously excerpted for both Infrared Roses and the video Backstage Pass)
2. "Death Don't Have No Mercy" > (Reverend Gary Davis) – 8:47
3. "Dear Mr. Fantasy" > (Jim Capaldi, Chris Wood, Steve Winwood) – 5:14
4. "Hey Jude" > (John Lennon, Paul McCartney) – 3:12
5. "Throwing Stones" > (Weir, Barlow) – 10:17
6. "Good Lovin' " (Rudy Clark, Arthur Resnick) – 9:21

October 9, 1989 – Encore:

7. "Attics of My Life" (Garcia, Hunter) – 6:32

== Personnel ==
Grateful Dead

- Jerry Garcia – lead guitar, vocals
- Mickey Hart – drums
- Bill Kreutzmann – drums
- Phil Lesh – electric bass, vocals
- Brent Mydland – keyboards, vocals
- Bob Weir – rhythm guitar, vocals

Production

- David Lemieux – producer
- John Cutler – recording
- Michael McGinn – mixing
- Brad Dollar – mixing
- David Glasser – CD mastering
- Jamie Howarth – 24-track tape transfer and restoration
- John K. Chester – 24-track tape transfer and restoration
- James R. Anderson – photography
- Steve Vance – art direction and package design
- Blair Jackson – liner notes
