= Victim or the Crime =

Song by Grateful Dead

from the album Built to Last
- Released: October 31, 1989
- Genre: Rock
- Length: 7:33
- Label: Arista
- Songwriters: Bob Weir; Gerrit Graham
- Producers: John Cutler; Jerry Garcia

"Victim or the Crime" is a song by American rock band the Grateful Dead. It was released on October 31, 1989, on their thirteenth and final studio album Built to Last. The track was written by rhythm guitarist and vocalist Bob Weir and outside lyricist Gerrit Graham.

Dating back to years before its release, "Victim or the Crime" contains dark, dissonant music which was inspired by Béla Bartók and Igor Stravinsky. Its contrast with the band's usually melodic material made it controversial with fans, as did its lyrics. However, it would become the most-played song from Built to Last in concert, and a performance of the track would appear on the band's next live album Without a Net (1990).

== Background ==
Weir originally wrote "Victim or the Crime" in 1983-1984, stating he began with a "snatch of chorus" before giving the song to Gerrit Graham, who "fleshed out" the lyrics as Weir continued working on its music. The song was Weir's first collaboration with Graham, as John Perry Barlow, Weir's usual writing partner, had not been able to "provide him with what he was looking for" in regards to the then-unfinished chorus lyrics. Graham stated that after receiving what Weir had already written, the rest of the lyrics "came out all of a piece and with no effort". In writing the song, Weir was inspired by Béla Bartók's Music for Strings, Percussion and Celesta and Igor Stravinsky's The Rite of Spring. He initially heavily utilized the Lydian scale, which he found to be "too light" for the song's subject matter. The use of the tritone was then added to the composition, which Weir felt sounded appropriately dissonant for the lyrics. Initially, the Grateful Dead showed little interest in the song, leading Weir to instead perform it solo and with his side project Bobby & the Midnites. According to Graham, the use of the word "junkie" in the song's lyrics was controversial among both the other band members and fans, due to concerns that the lyric referred to Garcia (which both Weir and Graham have denied). After being asked by Weir about his feelings on the lyric, Garcia responded "I don't give a fuck, sing what you want."

== Music and lyrics ==
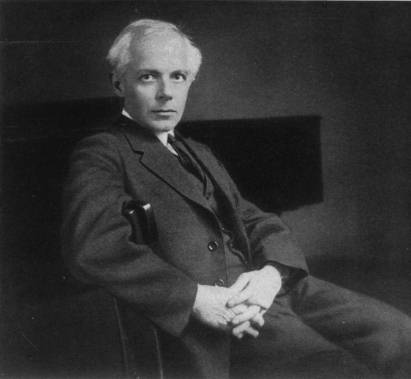
Weir cited composer Béla Bartók as an inspiration for "Victim or the Crime".

The song is characterized by a "dissonant" and "angular" sound, due to its unconventional harmony. Graham has described the song as a "mutant-Bartók extravaganza", while writer Oliver Trager characterizes it as a "complex, introspective piece that draws on avant-garde classical modernism while positing universal conundrums." In a 1989 interview with Musician, Jerry Garcia noted that the song "has an angular harmonic relationship that's so weird, you can't blow through it [while soloing] looking for key bases in a traditional sense". In This Is All a Dream We Dreamed: An Oral History of the Grateful Dead (2015), compiled by Blair Jackson and David Gans, Garcia is quoted as saying "it's one of Weir's stunningly odd compositions, but it's also very adventurous. It's uncompromising; it's what it is, and the challenge of coming up with stuff to play that sounds intelligent in the context has been incredible, but also appropriately gnarly." To thematically connect the music to the lyrics, Weir utilizes a "dissonant chordal [ascent]" as well as "contrapuntal lines [which] finally merge to a resolve at the end of [the progression] on a leading tone that takes to another harmonic mode". The progression also contains multiple different resolutions, such as dropping to the tonic for the first verse; later, the music instead resolves to the subdominant chord, as Weir felt that resolving to the tonic once more would result in too much tension. Finally, a transition to the relative minor is used as an "addendum" to the previous harmonic movements.

It's a hideous song. It's very angular and unattractive sounding. It's not an accessible song. It doesn't make itself easy to like. It just doesn't sound good, or rather, it sounds strange. And it is strange. It has strange steps in it, but that's part of what makes it interesting to play.

— Jerry Garcia

In interpreting the lyrics, Patrick Blackman of Sing Out! states that "like life, the song doesn’t neatly resolve itself. It leaves open the possibility that resolution will never come", though he also argues that the song is not necessarily about "dread or hopelessness". Blackman draws parallels between the song and traditional murder ballads, while noting the lack of a thorough story as is typical of such songs. Instead, the lyrics constitute a "narrative snapshot – a junkie turns to the bad and commits a crime", with the rest of the words being an "evocation of the singer's resulting existential crisis". Graham himself described the lyrics as "one big interrogative geschrei about existential dilemma: Are things really as they seem? What does anything mean? Who the fuck am I?" Graham also highlighted one of the song's verses as being about "things being turned upside down, about wondering if everything you believe is, in fact, bullshit", which he stated may have been inspired by having lived in Hollywood for a decade at the time of writing. Dodd notes that the lyric "And so I wrestle with the angel" is a reference to Genesis 32:24–32 in which Jacob "wrestles with a supernatural being, often rendered as an angel, who is trying to prevent him from crossing a stream."

== Reception ==
Likely due to its dissonant and dark tone, "Victim or the Crime" has long received a mixed reception from listeners and even the band itself, a fact which Weir acknowledged. In the 1989 Musician interview, Weir noted that some listeners had a "notion that [the band's songs] should be up, and that they shouldn't be frank and uncomfortable", which he stated the band was "trying to fight". Another interview with the Gavin Report saw Weir state that it was "not roundly well received when [the band] first started breaking it out. The subject matter and the music are both a little on the raw side for the kids who want to hear "Touch Of Grey"-you know, something a little softer around the edges." Bassist Phil Lesh stated that he initially "didn't particularly care for the attitude of the song", though it later grew on him. In a 2005 interview with Relix, Weir opined that the band "didn't really nail" the song when recording it for Built to Last, which he attributed to it not having "matured just through performance" by that time.

BBC Music Magazine dismissed the song as a "blustery, over-produced chore". Conversely, Melody Maker praised the track as "indisputably the Dead's finest achievement in 15 years". Lindsay Planer of AllMusic called the track a "diatribe rocker [which] is among Bob Weir's more notable contributions to the Grateful Dead's latter performance repertoire". Chris Hardman of The Guardian ranked it as the band's ninth-best song, calling it the Dead's "most controversial—yet by far the best—song of their late career". Planer also opined that after having time to develop, the song "matured into a well-crafted and sonically determined work that contrasts the somewhat non-committal nature of typical Grateful Dead songs." Trager cited the song as evidence of "Weir's maturity as a composer, lyricist, and musician" throughout the 1980s, while David Fricke has referred to it as a "fine late-period example" of Weir's compositional style. In a column for the band's official website, writer David Dodd noted it "took a long time" for him to warm up to the song, stating that while it is a "very strange piece", it could also "morph into an intense vehicle for jamming".

== Live performances ==
"Victim or the Crime" was first played live by the Grateful Dead on June 17, 1988. The song would be the most frequently-played from Built to Last by the band, appearing in 96 shows, and remained in setlists for the remainder of the band's existence. It would also be played by Weir's RatDog after the dissolution of the Grateful Dead.

=== Live releases ===
Live recordings of "Victim or the Crime" appear on:

- Without a Net (1990) – October 15, 1989
- Dick's Picks Volume 17 (2000) – September 25, 1991
- View from the Vault II (2001) – July 12, 1990
- Grateful Dead Download Series Volume 9 (2006) – April 3, 1989
- Road Trips Volume 2 Number 4 (2009) – May 26, 1993
- Formerly the Warlocks (2010) – October 8, 1989
- Spring 1990 (2012) – March 26, 1990
- Spring 1990 (The Other One) (2014) – March 21 & April 1, 1990
- 30 Trips Around the Sun (2015) – October 26, 1989
- Giants Stadium 1987, 1989, 1991 (2019) – July 9, 1989
- Dave's Picks Volume 40 (2021) – July 19, 1990
- Enjoying the Ride (2025) – July 15, 1989
- Dave's Picks Volume 55 (2025) – October 28, 1990

Bob Weir and Rob Wasserman recordings

- Live (1998)
- Fall 1989: The Long Island Sound (2013)
