= Gratest Hits =

Greatest hits album by Grateful Dead
- Released: June 13, 2025
- Recorded: 1970 – 1987
- Genre: Rock
- Length: 40:56
- Label: Rhino

Grateful Dead chronology
The Music Never Stopped (2025)	Gratest Hits (2025)	Dave's Picks Volume 55 (2025)

Gratest Hits is a compilation album by the rock band the Grateful Dead. It was released on June 13, 2025, through Rhino Entertainment. Produced in recognition of the band's 60th anniversary, it contains nine songs spanning the albums Workingman's Dead (1970) to In the Dark (1987).

== Track listing ==
Gratest Hits track listing
No.	Title	Writer(s)	Lead vocals	Length
1.	"Casey Jones" (from Workingman's Dead, 1970)	Jerry Garcia; Robert Hunter	Garcia	4:24
2.	"Friend of the Devil" (from American Beauty, 1970)	Garcia; John Dawson; Hunter	Garcia	3:24
3.	"Box of Rain" (from American Beauty)	Phil Lesh; Hunter	Lesh	5:18
4.	"Sugar Magnolia" (from American Beauty)	Bob Weir; Hunter	Weir	3:19
5.	"Truckin'" (from American Beauty)	Garcia; Lesh; Weir; Hunter	Weir	5:03
6.	"Scarlet Begonias" (from From the Mars Hotel, 1974)	Garcia; Hunter	Garcia	4:20
7.	"Fire on the Mountain" (from Shakedown Street, 1978)	Mickey Hart; Hunter	Garcia	3:46
8.	"Estimated Prophet" (from Terrapin Station, 1977)	Weir; John Perry Barlow	Weir	5:35
9.	"Touch of Grey" (from In the Dark, 1987)	Garcia; Hunter	Garcia	5:47

== Personnel ==
Grateful Dead

- Jerry Garcia – guitar, vocals
- Bob Weir – guitar, vocals
- Phil Lesh – bass, vocals
- Bill Kreutzmann – drums
- Mickey Hart – drums (Workingman's Dead, American Beauty, Shakedown Street, Terrapin Station, In the Dark)
- Ron "Pigpen" McKernan – keyboards, harmonica, vocals (Workingman's Dead, American Beauty)
- Keith Godchaux – keyboards (From the Mars Hotel, Shakedown Street, Terrapin Station)
- Donna Jean Godchaux – vocals (From the Mars Hotel, Shakedown Street, Terrapin Station)
- Brent Mydland – keyboards, vocals (In the Dark)

Production

- Compilation produced for release by David Lemieux
- Executive producer: Mark Pinkus
- Associate producers: Brian Dodd, Jason Jones, Ivette Ramos
- Mastering: David Glasser
- Cover art: Helen Kennedy
- Design: Steve Vance
- Packaging manager: Shannon Ward

== Charts ==
=== Weekly charts ===
Weekly chart performance for Gratest Hits
Chart (2025)	Peak position
Hungarian Albums (MAHASZ)	40
