= Dick's Picks Volume 5 =

Live album by Grateful Dead
- Released: May 30, 1996
- Recorded: December 26, 1979
- Genres: Rock, jam, folk rock
- Length: 176:06
- Label: Grateful Dead

Grateful Dead chronology
| Dick's Picks Volume 4 (1996) | Dick's Picks Volume 5 (1996) | Dozin' at the Knick (1996) |

Professional ratings
Review scores
| Source | Rating |
|---|---|
| Allmusic | 4/5 stars |
| The Music Box | 4/5 stars |
| Rolling Stone | 3/5 stars |
| Entertainment Weekly | B− |

Dick's Picks Volume 5 is the fifth live album in the Dick's Picks series of releases by the Grateful Dead. It was recorded on December 26, 1979, at the Oakland Auditorium Arena in Oakland, California. It was released in May 1996.

This concert was a benefit for the Seva Foundation, an organization started by Ram Dass and Wavy Gravy. Bob Weir sat on the advisory board until his death in January 2026.

Volume 5 was the first of the Dick's Picks to contain a complete concert. It was also the first release of a full concert to feature keyboardist Brent Mydland.

Another Grateful Dead album that was recorded at the December 1979 run of concerts at the Oakland Auditorium is Road Trips Volume 3 Number 1.

== Enclosure ==
Included with the release is a single sheet folded in half, yielding a four-page enclosure. The front duplicates the cover of the CD and the back contains a black-and-white photograph showing the entire scene: two skeletons on top of the stage, the sound system and lights above the band, the band on stage, and finally, at the bottom of the image, a portion of the crowd watching them. The two pages inside feature a black-and-white photograph of the band on stage along with lists of the contents of and credits for the release.

== Caveat emptor ==
Each volume of Dick's Picks has its own "caveat emptor" label, advising the listener of the sound quality of the recording. The label for Volume 5 reads:

"This compact disc has been digitally remastered directly from the original half track stereo analog tape. It is a snapshot of history, not a modern professional recording, and may therefore exhibit some technical anomalies and the unavoidable effects of the ravages of time."

== Track listing ==
Disc one

First set:

1. "Cold Rain and Snow" (Traditional, arr. Grateful Dead) – 6:44
2. "C.C. Rider" (Ma Rainey, Lena Arant) – 6:43
3. "Dire Wolf" (Jerry Garcia, Robert Hunter) – 3:58
4. "Me and My Uncle" (John Phillips) – 2:59 →
5. "Big River" (Johnny Cash) – 5:59
6. "Brown-Eyed Women" (Garcia, Hunter) – 5:20
7. "New Minglewood Blues" (Noah Lewis) – 7:41
8. "Friend of the Devil" (Garcia, John Dawson, Hunter) – 9:37
9. "Looks Like Rain" (Bob Weir, John Perry Barlow) – 8:14
10. "Alabama Getaway" (Garcia, Hunter) – 6:58 →
11. "Promised Land" (Chuck Berry) – 4:26

Disc two

Second set:

1. "Uncle John's Band" (Garcia, Hunter) – 10:14 →
2. "Estimated Prophet" (Weir, Barlow) – 14:11 →
3. "Jam" (Garcia, Mickey Hart, Bill Kreutzmann, Phil Lesh, Brent Mydland, Weir) – 6:01 →
4. "He's Gone" (Garcia, Hunter) – 10:03 →
5. "The Other One" (Weir, Kreutzmann) – 8:38 →
6. "Drums" (Hart, Kreutzmann) – 6:03 →

Disc three

1. "Drums" (Hart, Kreutzmann) – 4:22 →
2. "Jam" (Garcia, Hart, Kreutzmann, Lesh, Mydland, Weir) – 6:03 →
3. "Not Fade Away" (Charles Hardin, Norman Petty) – 11:52 →
4. "Brokedown Palace" (Garcia, Hunter) – 4:49 →
5. "Around and Around" (Berry) – 3:57 →
6. "Johnny B. Goode" (Berry) – 4:28

Encore:

7. "Shakedown Street" (Garcia, Hunter) – 13:52 →
8. "Uncle John's Band" (Garcia, Hunter) – 2:54

== Personnel ==
Grateful Dead

- Jerry Garcia - lead guitar, vocals
- Mickey Hart - drums
- Bill Kreutzmann - drums
- Phil Lesh - electric bass
- Brent Mydland - keyboards, vocals
- Bob Weir - guitar, vocals

Production

- Betty Cantor-Jackson - recording
- Dick Latvala - tape archivist
- Jeffrey Norman - CD mastering
- Jay Blakesberg - photo
- Gecko Graphics - design
