= MVP Arena =

Indoor arena in Albany, New York, U.S.

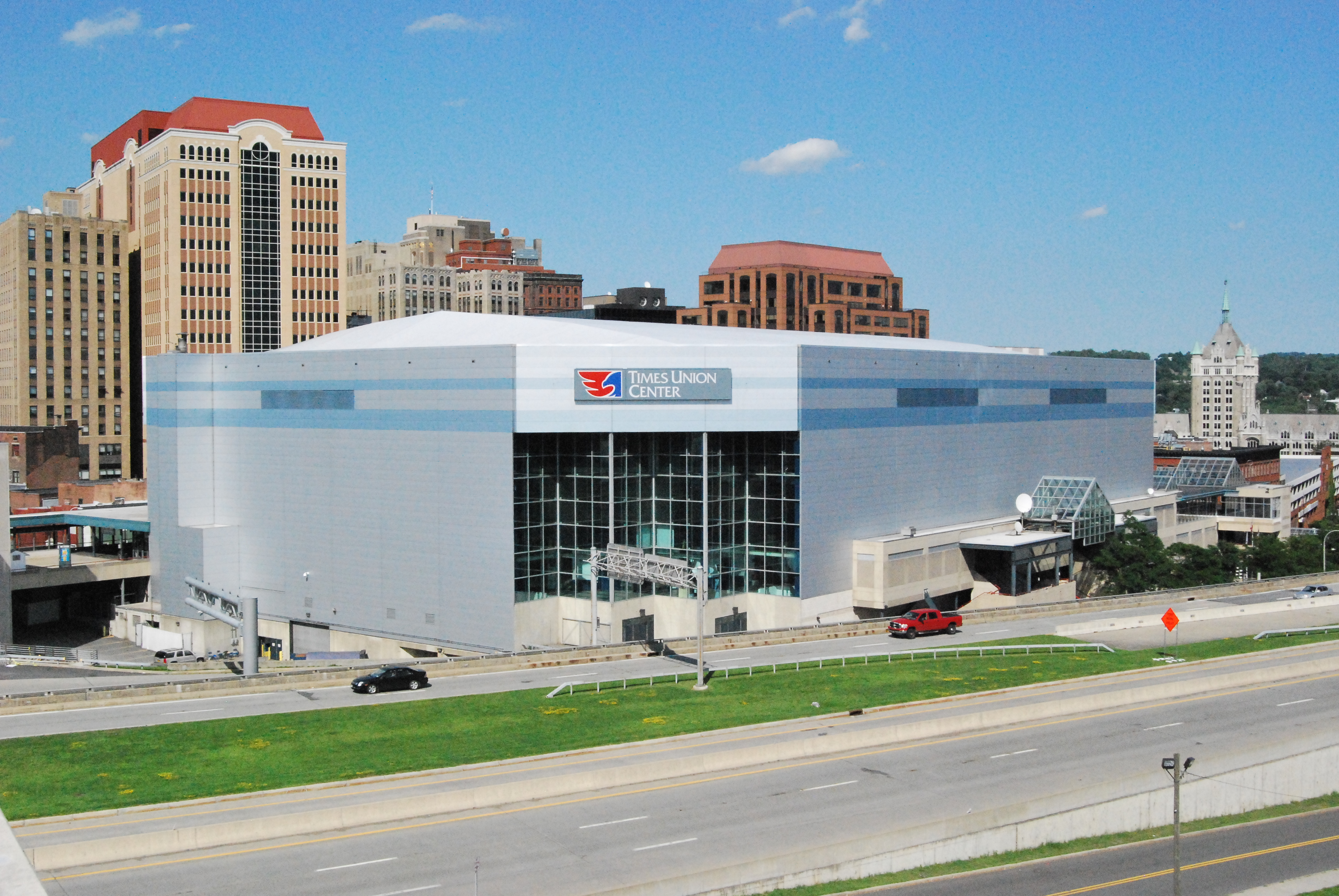
- MVP Arena, then known as Times Union Center, in 2011.

- Location within New York State Location within the United States
- Interactive map of MVP Arena
- Former names: Knickerbocker Arena (1990–1997); Pepsi Arena (1997–2007); Times Union Center (2007-2021)
- Address: 51 South Pearl Street
- Location: Albany, New York, U.S.
- Coordinates: 42°38′55″N 73°45′17″W
- Owner: Albany County
- Operator: ASM Global
- Capacity: 15,357 (concerts); 15,229 (basketball); 14,236 (hockey/lacrosse); 13,785 (arena football); 17,500 (max)
- Surface: Multi-surface

Construction
- Groundbreaking: February 5, 1987
- Opened: January 30, 1990
- Cost: $69.4 million, $1.6 million (2010 renovation)
- Architect: Crozier Associates
- Structural engineer: Clough Harbour & Associates
- General contractor: Beltrone/MLB

Tenants
- Albany Firebirds (AFL) (1990–2000); New York Kick (NPSL) (1990–1991); Albany Choppers (IHL) (1990–1991); Albany Patroons (CBA) (1990–1992); Siena Saints (NCAA) (1990–present); Albany River Rats (AHL) (1993–2010); Albany Attack (NLL) (2000–2003); Albany Conquest/Firebirds (af2) (2002–2009); Albany Devils (AHL) (2010–2017); Albany Empire (AFL) (2018–2019); Albany Hyenas (IBLA) (2020–2021); Albany Empire (NAL) (2021–2023); Albany FireWolves (NLL) (2022–2025); Albany Firebirds (AFL/AF1) (2024–present)

Website
- mvparena.com

MVP Arena (originally Knickerbocker Arena, and then the Pepsi Arena and Times Union Center) is an indoor arena located in Albany, New York. It is configurable and can accommodate from 6,000 to 17,500 people, with a maximum seating capacity of 15,500 for sporting events.

The building, designed by Crozier Associates and engineered by Clough Harbour & Associates, was built by Beltrone/MLB at a cost of $69.4 million.

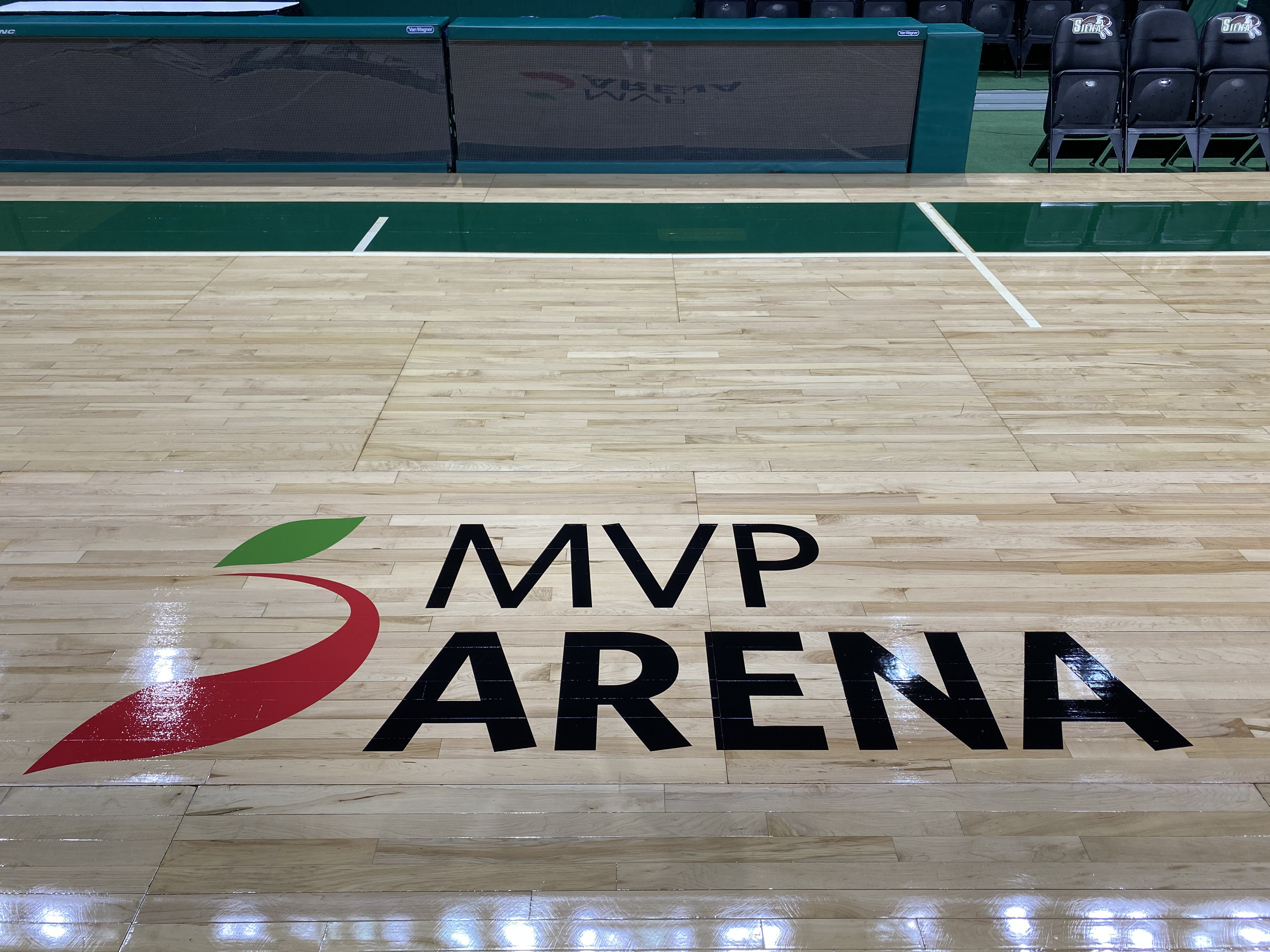
MVP Arena logo pictured on the Siena Men's Basketball court in 2022

== History ==
The arena was opened on January 30, 1990, as the Knickerbocker Arena with a performance by Frank Sinatra.

The naming rights of the arena were sold to Pepsi in 1997 and it was known as Pepsi Arena from 1997 to 2006. In May 2006, the naming rights were sold to the Times Union, a regional newspaper, and the name of the arena became the Times Union Center on January 1, 2007. In October 2021, the Times Union relinquished naming rights. On November 15, 2021, it was announced that health care provider MVP Health Services had successfully acquired the naming rights. The Times Union, which is the largest newspaper for the Albany area, had declined to renew its naming rights, leading to MVP Arena's renaming. The new name took effect on January 1, 2022.

The building is managed by ASM Global.

The New York State Democratic Convention nominated then-First Lady Hillary Clinton as its U.S. Senate candidate at their statewide convention at Times Union Center on May 16, 2000. Her husband, President of the United States Bill Clinton, attended the event.

When the New Jersey Devils' AHL franchise relocated to this arena in the summer of 2010, the arena received a new scoreboard, LED ribbons above the luxury suites and new outside lighting, as well as an upgraded home team locker room.

The arena is home to the Siena Saints men's basketball of the Metro Atlantic Athletic Conference since the arena opened in 1990, the Albany Firebirds of the Arena Football League beginning in 2024 and the Albany FireWolves of the National Lacrosse League from late 2021 to 2025, when it relocated to Oshawa, Ontario.

== Sports ==
The Siena College's men's basketball team has been a major tenant of the arena.

Previous tenants have included the Albany Firebirds (formerly Albany Conquest) of af2, the original Albany Firebirds of the AFL, the Albany Empire of the AFL, the Albany Patroons of the CBA, the Albany Choppers of the IHL, the Albany River Rats of the AHL, the Albany Attack of the NLL and the New York Kick of the NPSL II.

MVP Arena also regularly hosts exhibition games of major sports leagues. The NBA, WNBA and NHL have all played games at the arena.

Andre Agassi played John McEnroe just three days after Agassi won the US Open in 1994.

The arena also hosts Monster Jam and Hot Wheels Monster Trucks Live.

In addition, the arena has hosted the Professional Bull Riders premier tour in 2008 and again in 2022, with another in 2023 in conjunction with the 2024 PBR season.

=== Ice hockey ===
In 1990, the Fort Wayne Komets of the International Hockey League relocated to Albany and became the Albany Choppers, playing their games in the new arena—but struggled with ticket sales due the presence of two other nearby American Hockey League (AHL) franchises, including the Capital District Islanders that also began play in the same season at the Houston Field House in Troy. The Choppers folded in February 1991.

MVP Arena became the home to an AHL franchise in 1993, when the Capital District Islanders relocated and became the Albany River Rats and the building's primary tenant until 2017. The River Rats won the Calder Cup championship in 1994–95.

On April 24, 2008, one of the longest games in the history of the AHL took place at the arena. Ryan Potulny scored the winning goal for the Philadelphia Phantoms at 2:58 of the fifth overtime period after 142 minutes and 58 seconds of hockey, played over 5 hours and 38 minutes. In the process, River Rats goaltender Michael Leighton set a modern-day record by making 98 saves.

Following the River Rats' relocation to Charlotte, N.C., in 2010, the Albany Devils began play in the AHL.

It was announced on January 31, 2017, that the Devils would relocate to Binghamton following the completion of the 2016–17 season ending 24 years of AHL hockey in the arena. At the time of the relocation, the Devils were drawing the lowest average attendance in the league.

=== WWE ===
MVP Arena has hosted many live events and televised shows for the WWE professional wrestling promotion. Notable events include the 1992 Royal Rumble, where Ric Flair won the 30-man over-the-top-rope match to become the new WWF Champion. The 2000 No Mercy was also held there and is the third No Mercy professional wrestling pay-per-view (PPV) event produced by the WWF. This event was notable for the return of Stone Cold Steve Austin after a neck injury sidelined him for the better part of a year and for Kurt Angle winning the WWF Championship for the first time in his career. In 2006, at WWE New Year's Revolution, Edge cashed in the first ever Money in the Bank contract to defeat John Cena for the WWE Championship after Cena retained his title in an Elimination Chamber match.

On May 20, 2019, the WWE 24/7 Championship was introduced by Mick Foley to the WWE Universe on Monday Night Raw with Titus O'Neil becoming the inaugural champion. It was also at the arena that, on the March 22, 1999 of Raw, Steve Austin drove to the ring in a beer truck and gave a "beer bath" to Vince McMahon, Shane McMahon and The Rock, a notable moment during the Attitude Era.

MVP Arena is also home to the International Professional Wrestling Hall of Fame, a wrestling hall of fame and museum.

=== College sports ===
MVP Arena hosted the ECAC Hockey championships each March from 2003 until 2010, when the league announced the tournament was moved to Boardwalk Hall in Atlantic City, New Jersey; and is often home to the annual Metro Atlantic Athletic Conference basketball tournament (1990–96, 1998, 2000, 2002, 2004, 2006, 2008–10, and 2015–19).

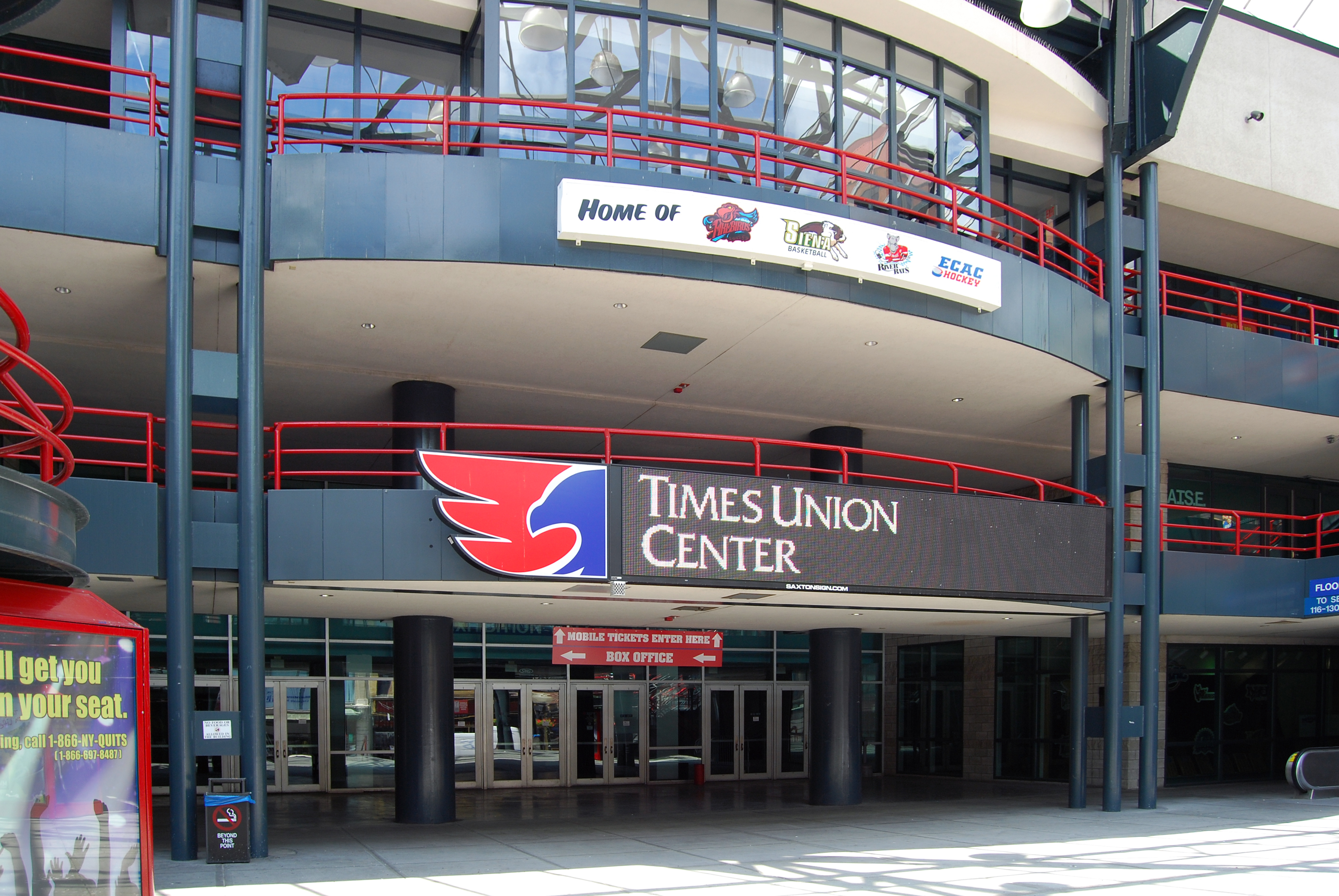
MVP Arena's atrium circa 2008, with the 2007-2020 Times Union Center signage

In 2003, MVP Arena hosted the NCAA basketball East Regional, which was won by Syracuse University on their way to their first national championship. The arena also hosted the first and second rounds of the 1995 NCAA Division I men's basketball tournament as the Knickerbocker Arena.

In 2008, MVP Arena hosted the NCAA ice hockey East Regional tournament. The arena hosted ice-hockey regionals in even-numbered years from 2004 through 2010, which was the eighth time the East Regional has been held at the site.

In 2000, MVP Arena hosted a regional quarterfinal between St. Lawrence University and Boston University, which went into quadruple overtime. The game was the longest in the history of the tournament and, at the time, the second longest game in Division I men's college hockey history.

MVP Arena also hosted the men's Frozen Four on two occasions, in 1992 (as Knickerbocker Arena) when Lake Superior State University defeated Wisconsin for the national championship, and again in 2001 as the Pepsi Arena when Boston College defeated North Dakota.

The venue hosted the NCAA women's basketball tournament from March 28 to 31, 2015, and six games of the NCAA Women's Albany 1 and Albany 2 Regionals (Sweet 16 and Elite 8) from March 29 to April 1, 2024. The NCAA hockey East Regional for the ninth time was hosted from March 25 to 27, 2016. MVP Arena once again hosted the 1st and 2nd Rounds Of the 2023 Men's Basketball Tournament on March 17 and March 19, 2023.

=== High school sports ===
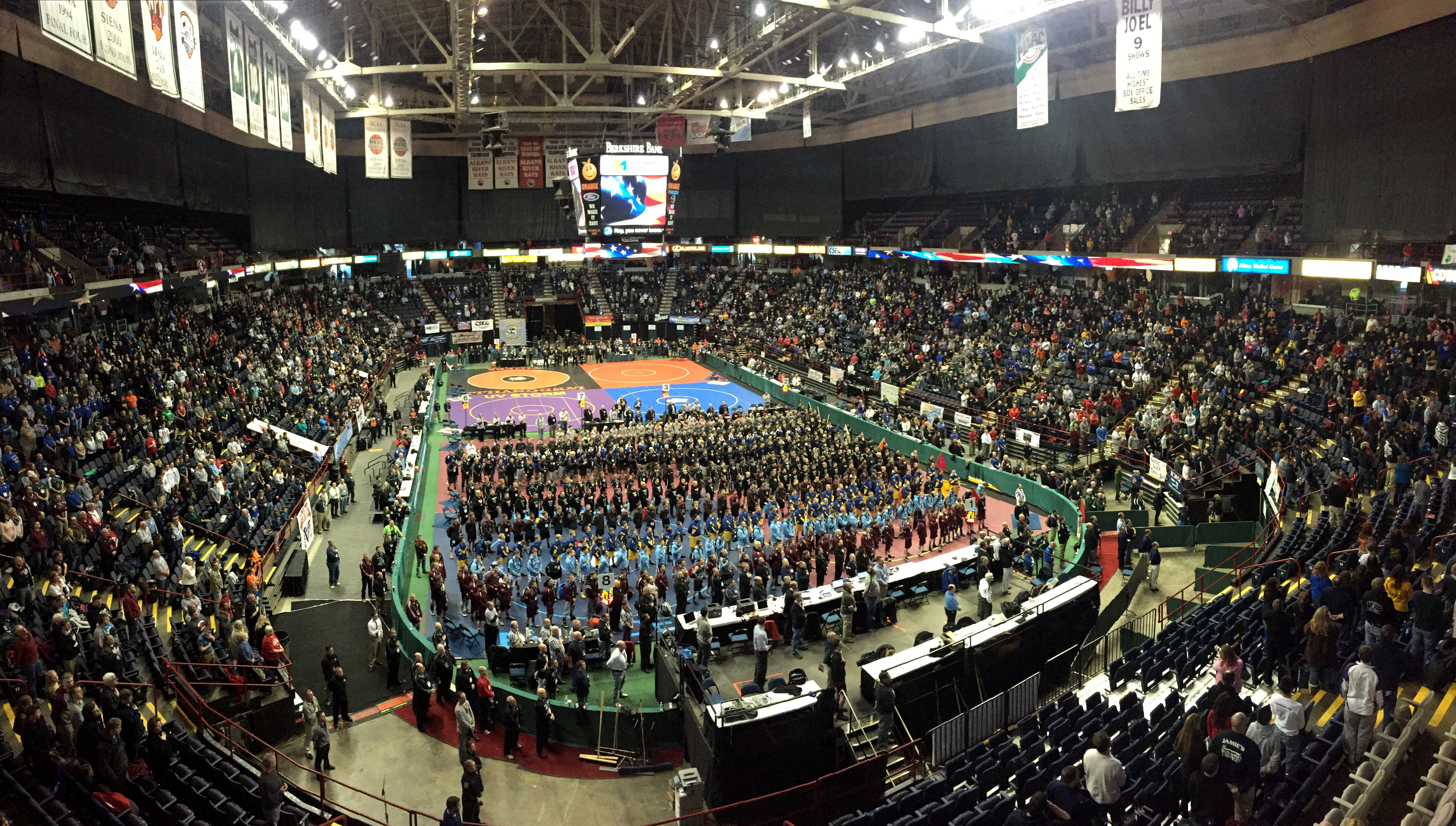
Wrestlers gather on the floor of MVP Arena (then Times Union Center) for the opening ceremony of the 53rd NYSPHSAA Wrestling Championships on February 27, 2015.

MVP Arena has been a regular host of the NYSPHSAA Wrestling Championships since 2005 and has won a bid to host the annual event each year through 2018. According to the Albany County Convention and Visitors Bureau, the wrestling state tournament annually contributes more than $1.5 million into the Capital Region economy, and in 2011 it was the second-largest sporting event in Albany County.

=== Arena Football ===
Albany has had a long history of Arena Football. The Albany Firebirds were the first Arena Football team in Albany in 1990. They were successful, as they won ArenaBowl XIII in 1999. Then, after the team moved in 2000 they got an AF2 team called the Albany Conquest in 2002. They were not as successful as their predecessors, making the playoffs three of the seven years they existed. In 2009, they rebranded back to the Albany Firebirds and made the playoffs, but lost in the first round. After 8 years, it was announced that the Albany Empire would be entering the Arena Football League in 2018 and they made the #1 seed in the playoffs in back-to-back seasons. In 2019, MVP Arena hosted ArenaBowl XXXII which Albany beat the Philadelphia Soul 45-27 and it was the final game ever played in the Arena Football League's second iteration. In 2020, it was announced that the National Arena League would be bringing a new team to Albany, and it brought back the Albany Empire name. The new Empire would win back-to-back NAL championships in 2021 and 2022. The arena also hosted AFL/AF1's Albany Firebirds and also hosted the 2025 Arena Crown where the Firebirds defeated the Nashville Kats 60-57 to finish with a perfect record that season.

== Music ==
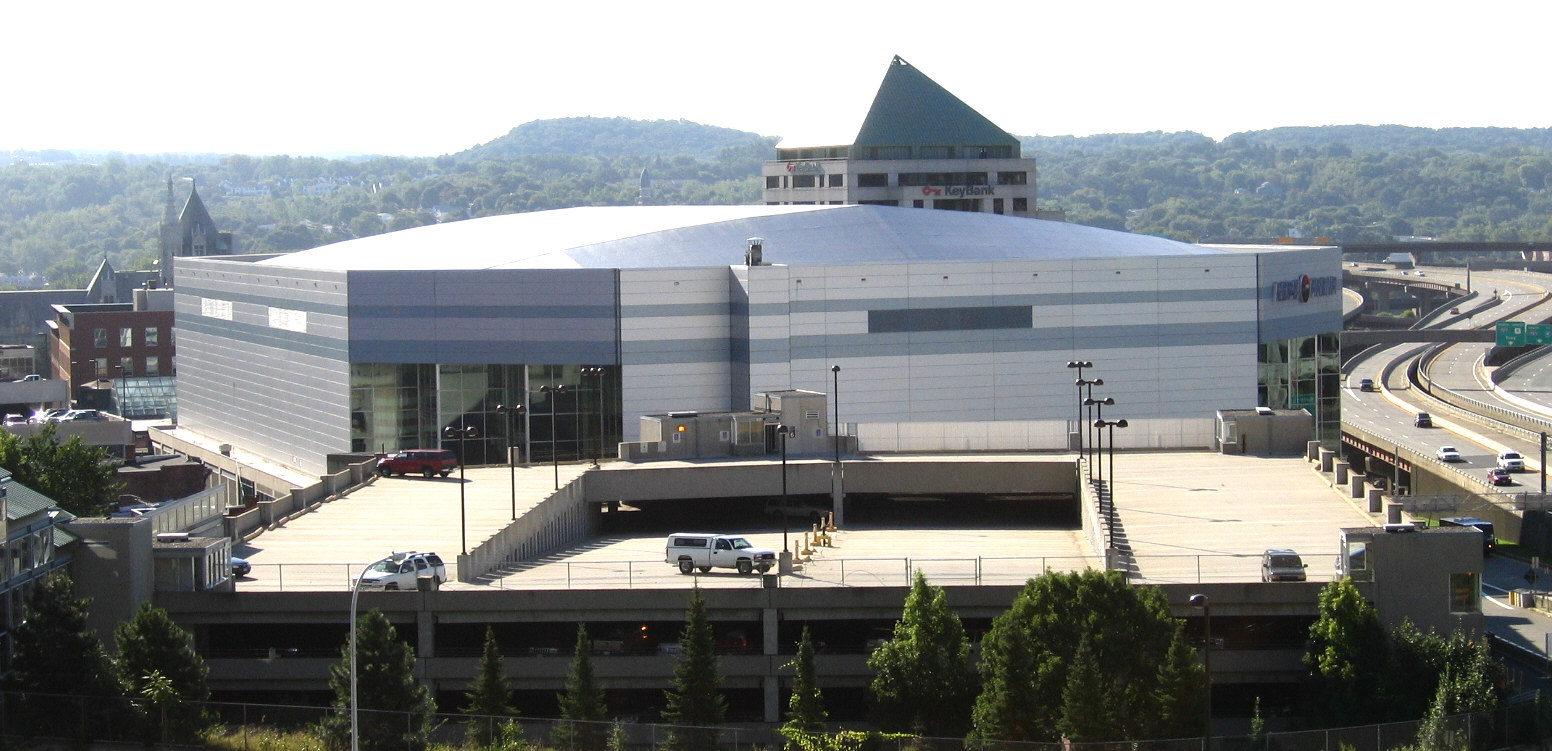
MVP Arena and its parking garage, as viewed from the Empire State Plaza, circa 2006. The 1997–2006 Pepsi Arena signage is visible in this photo.

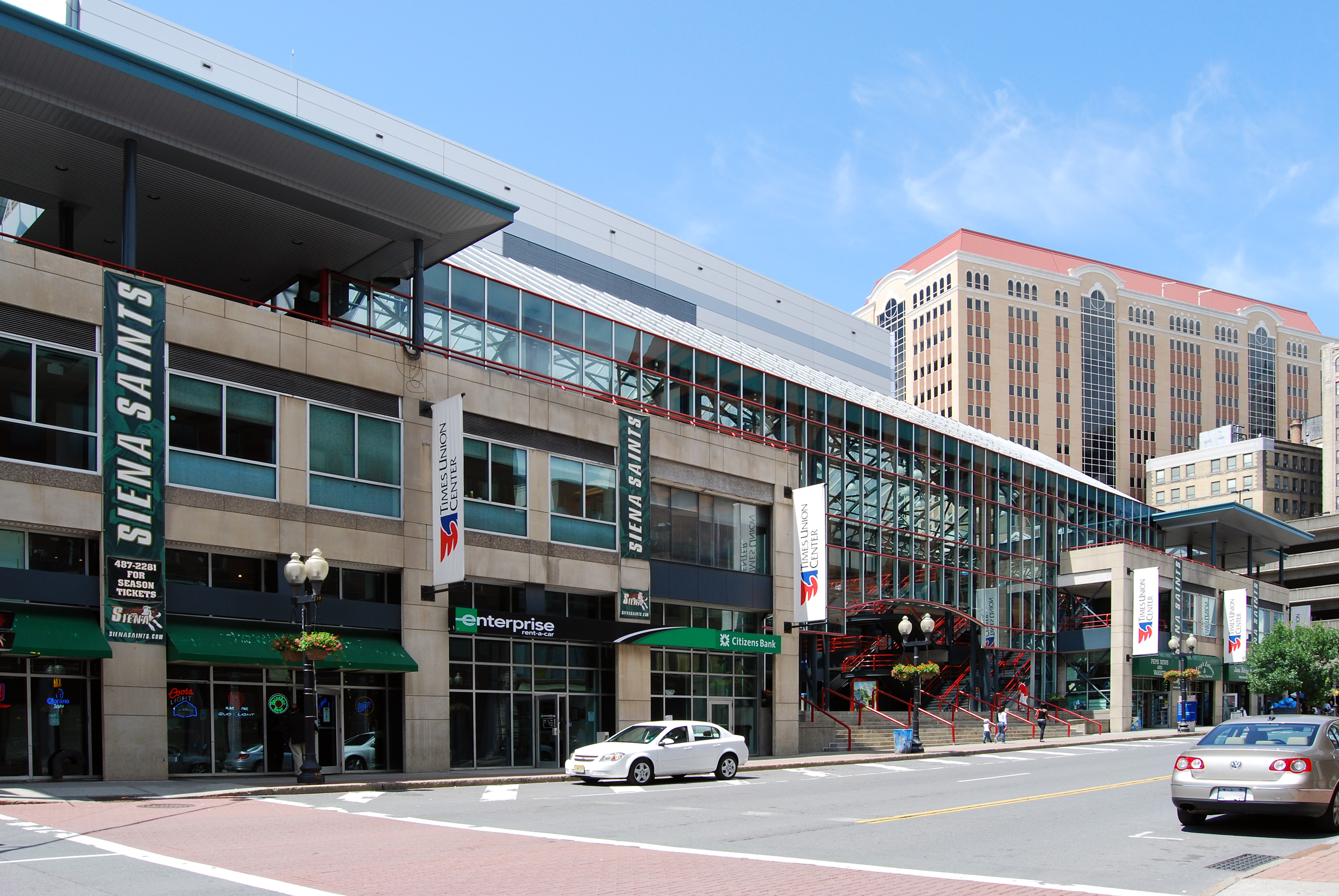
View of MVP Arena (then Times Union Center) from Pearl Street, circa 2009

The first-ever event at the arena was a Frank Sinatra concert on January 30, 1990.

The Grateful Dead played the Knickerbocker Arena a total of thirteen times (and the Jerry Garcia Band on another two occasions), spanning March 24, 1990 to June 22, 1995,.

The three shows from March 1990 have all been officially issued on CD, though via a number of releases, including Dozin' at the Knick, Without a Net, Spring 1990, Spring 1990 (The Other One), and Postcards of the Hanging.

Whitesnake played at the arena during their Slip of the Tongue world tour in 1990. The concert took place February 15, and there were many empty seats due to a blizzard keeping many fans from getting to the arena.

Gloria Estefan played at the arena on August 30, 1991, during her 1991-1992 “Into The Light World Tour.”

Metallica played at MVP Arena, then known as the Knickerbocker Arena, on February 28, 1992, during their Wherever We May Roam Tour. Their second show at the arena was on April 6, 1997 for their Poor Touring Me Tour, the opening act was Corrosion of Conformity. The band again played at the Arena, then known as the Pepsi Arena, on October 9, 2004, during their Madly in Anger with the World tour. Metallica played at the arena on November 12, 2009, during their World Magnetic Tour.

U2 played at the arena in 1992 and again in 2001.

Phish has played the arena 16 times, most recently a series of benefit concerts for Anastasio's Divided Sky Foundation, in October 2024.

Demi Lovato played at the arena on September 7, 2014, as part of their Demi World Tour.

On March 18, 2019, Ariana Grande opened her Sweetener World Tour at the arena.

Céline Dion returned to the arena after 21 years on December 7, 2019, as part of her Courage World Tour. Dion's first performance at the arena took place on December 1, 1998, as part of her Let's Talk About Love World Tour.

== Notable sellouts ==
- The Rolling Stones, A Bigger Bang Tour – September 17, 2005
- Paul McCartney, Out There Tour – July 5, 2014; sold out in 28 minutes on April 14, 2014.
- Philadelphia Soul at Albany Empire on April 14, 2018. First home game for the Empire.

== Gallery ==
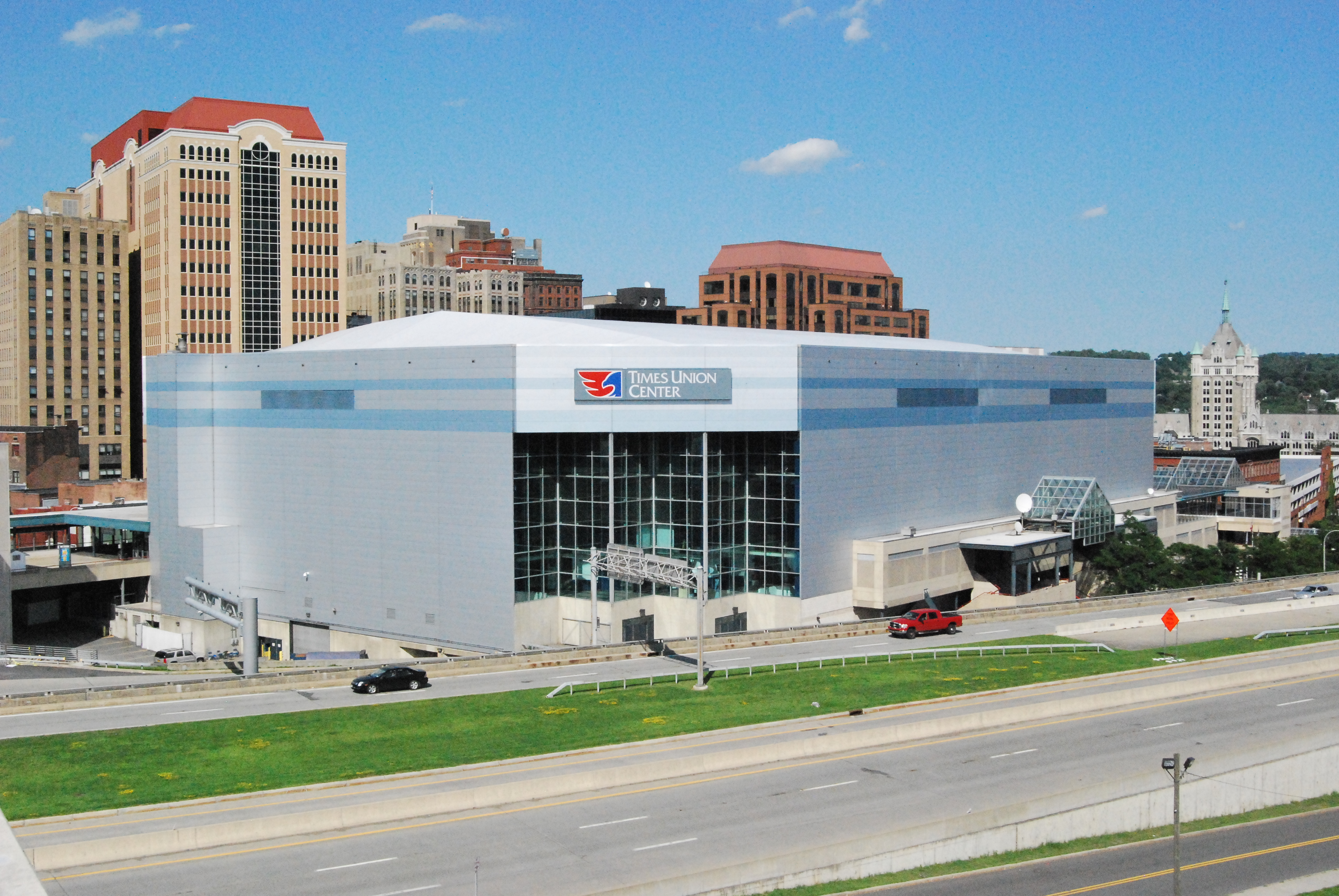
Full exterior

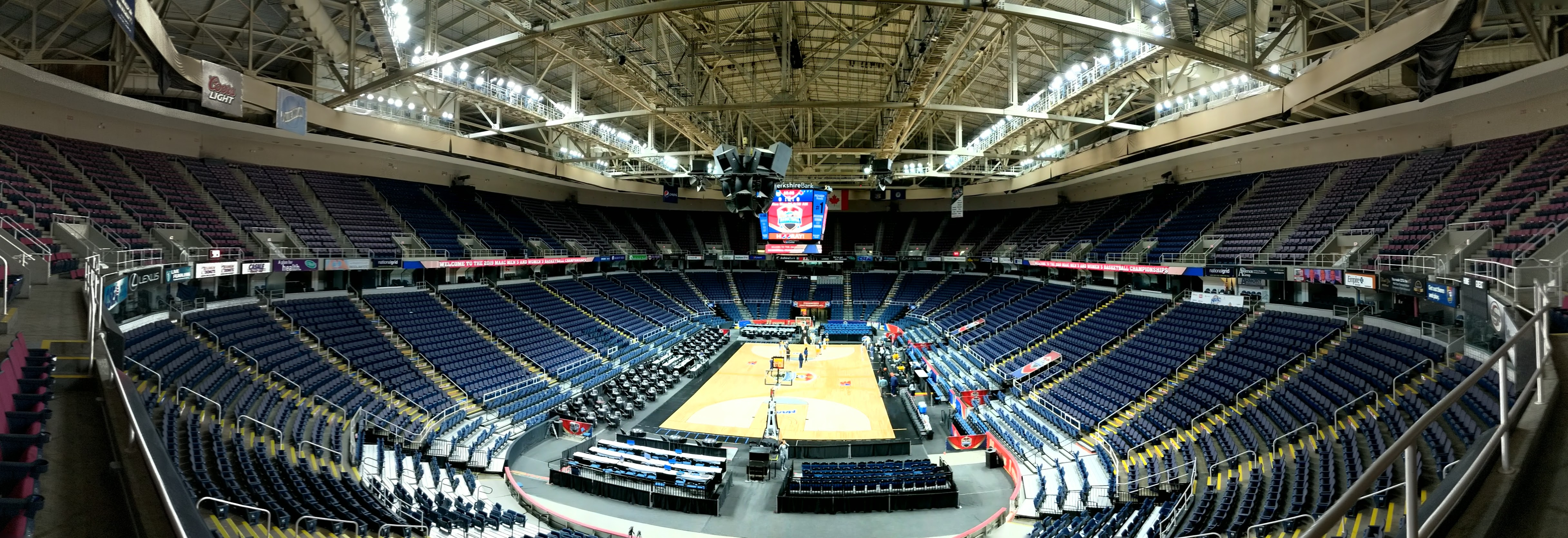
Interior panorama

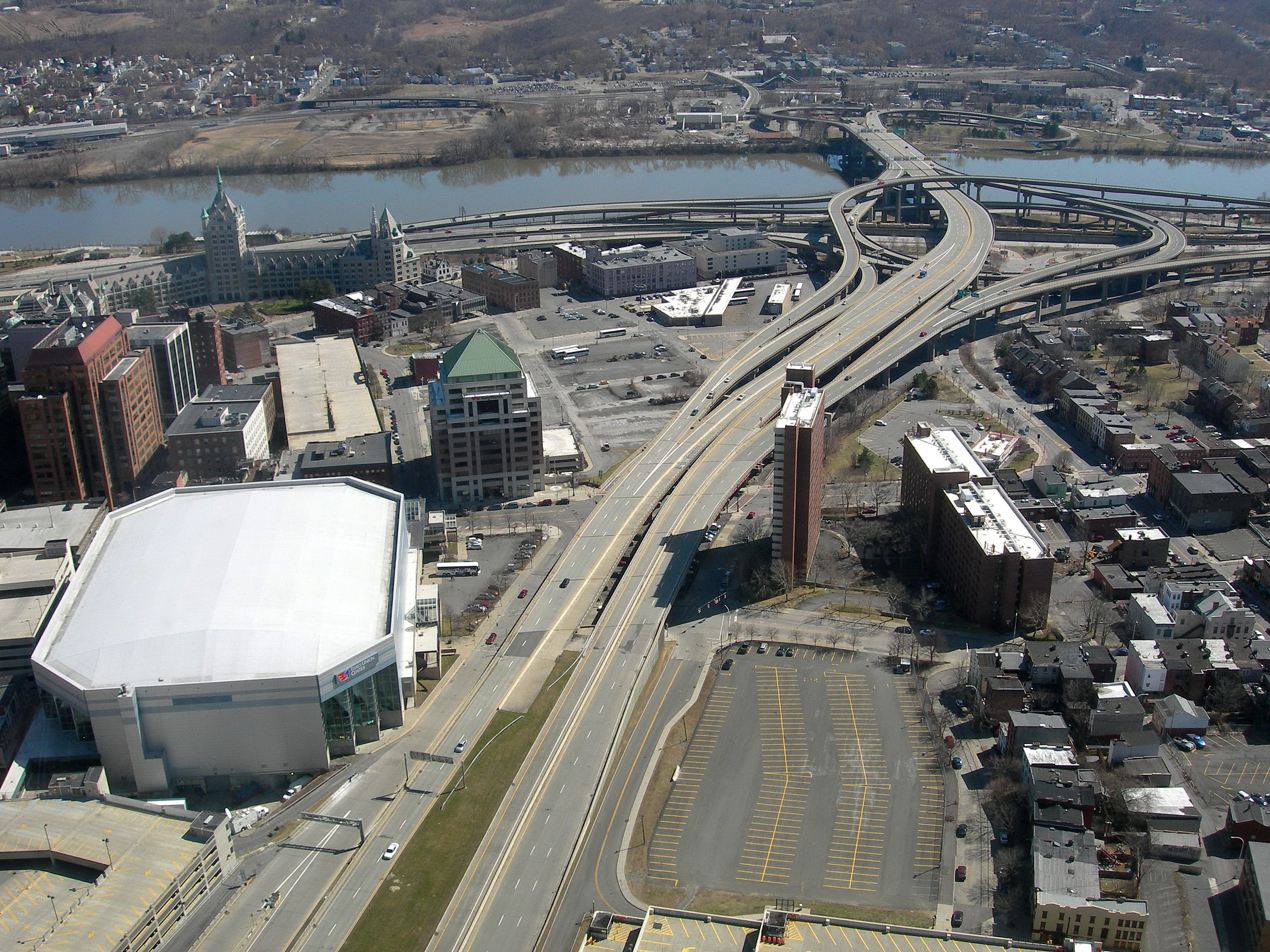
Aerial view in its urban context

== See also ==
- List of NCAA Division I basketball arenas

Events and tenants
Preceded by first arena	Home of the Albany Firebirds; 1990–2010	Succeeded by Conseco Fieldhouse (as Indiana Firebirds)
Preceded by Houston Field House (as Capital District Islanders)	Home of the Albany River Rats; 1993–2010	Succeeded by Time Warner Cable Arena (as Charlotte Checkers)
Preceded by Saint Paul Civic Center; Saint Paul, Minnesota	Host of the men's Frozen Four; 1992	Succeeded by Bradley Center; Milwaukee
Preceded by Providence Civic Center; Providence, Rhode Island	Host of the men's Frozen Four; 2001	Succeeded by Xcel Energy Center; Saint Paul, Minnesota
Preceded by Tsongas Center (as Lowell Devils)	Home of the Albany Devils; 2010–2017	Succeeded by Floyd L. Maines Veterans Memorial Arena (as Binghamton Devils)
