= Without a Net =

Live album by The Grateful Dead
- Released: September 1990
- Recorded: October 9, 1989–April 1, 1990
- Genre: Jam rock
- Length: 131:56
- Label: Arista
- Producers: John Cutler, Phil Lesh

The Grateful Dead chronology
Built to Last (1989)	Without a Net (1990)	One from the Vault (1991)

Without a Net is the eighth live album by the Grateful Dead (their twenty-second overall). It was released in September 1990 through Arista Records as a double-CD and triple-LP set. The album, which compiles highlights from concerts recorded between October 1989 and April 1990, is meant to simulate the flow of an actual Grateful Dead concert. Upon release, the album reached the top 50 in the US and was certified Gold by the RIAA in November 1990. It is the final contemporary live album that was released in their career.

== Background ==
The Grateful Dead's albums had frustrated critics and fans alike for neither approaching nor accurately representing the band's live concert sound and experience—to the point that band-approved, fan-made tapes were preferred to official releases. The band's organization had poured profits into sound reinforcement and cutting-edge technology for their concert performances and were likewise frustrated by the seeming shortfall in capturing their sound on album.

With the advent of digital technology, Without a Net was the band's first contemporary live project in nine years, and featured selections from then-recent tours in an attempt to allow the home listener a closer facsimile of the band's engulfing sound system. Touting the advancement in production clarity, the accompanying shrink wrap sticker proclaimed: "The world's grandest, largest, best live recording."

The resulting album achieved gold-status sales within weeks of its release—the first live album by the band to do so. A series of live releases followed, beginning with a complete concert performance in its entirety. The release of archival live performances continued after the 1995 dissolution of the band and is ongoing.

== Content and packaging ==
The album title uses the idiom metaphorically, alluding to the band's disinclination for prepared set lists. They preferred just to play and let the song choice evolve by sense for each performance, pulling from a repertoire of over 100 then-common songs. In keeping with that notion, the packaging used a circus theme, with a "Big Top Limited Edition" also-available, featuring clowns and related artwork. The album's dedication to Clifton Hanger is a reference to keyboardist Brent Mydland, who used the alias for hotel registration. Mydland died before the album's release.

The album is an attempt to compile some of the best performances from then-recent tours and present them as an archetypal Grateful Dead concert, as they sounded at that time. However, Mydland's death and the subsequent addition of Vince Welnick and Bruce Hornsby had changed the band's live sound by the time the album was available. Seventeen songs were chosen from two of the most recent tours and sequenced to represent typical set placement (though the traditional "Drums" solo and "Space" improvisation are absent, and the final "encore" track is given an early fade out).

== Reception ==
Professional ratings
Review scores
Source	Rating
AllMusic	4/5 stars
The Encyclopedia of Popular Music	2/5 stars
Entertainment Weekly	A−

A contemporary review in Billboard praised Without a Net for sounding "uniformly clear without [being] too polished", and noted its appeal to both "die-hards" as well as "the casual fan who just wants to know more about the cult of the Dead." The Gavin Report remarked that the album "closes the gap between what dedicated Deadheads imbibe in at a live concert and what broadcasters beam over the airwaves."

Retrospective reviews are also positive. Lindsey Planer of AllMusic considers the album to be "the strongest and most accurate representation of how the concurrent Grateful Dead sounded since the epic Live/Dead album some two decades earlier." Planer highlights the performances of "Althea", "Bird Song", "Cassidy" and the "Help on the Way" / "Slipknot" / "Franklin's Tower" sequence as "definitive versions". In a 1993 overview of the band's entire main catalogue, Benjamin Svetkey of Entertainment Weekly deemed the album to be the band's "finest live release since Europe '72", highlighting its "scorching renditions" of "Mississippi Half-Step Uptown Toodeloo", "Bird Song", and "One More Saturday Night", as well as the "lush" "Eyes of the World" with Branford Marsalis. In a review of The Story of the Grateful Dead (2020), Stereophile writer John Swenson called Without a Net an "overlooked gem" which "shows a mature band at the height of its conceptual unity and improvisational powers".

== Track listing ==
Disc one
No.	Title	Writer(s)	Recording date and venue	Length
1.	"Feel Like a Stranger"	Bob Weir, John Barlow	October 9, 1989, at Hampton Coliseum	7:32
2.	"Mississippi Half-Step Uptown Toodeloo"	Jerry Garcia, Robert Hunter	March 21, 1990, at Copps Coliseum	8:00
3.	"Walkin' Blues"	Robert Johnson, arr. Weir	March 15, 1990, at Capital Centre	5:44
4.	"Althea"	Garcia, Hunter	March 15, 1990, at Capital Centre	6:55
5.	"Cassidy"	Weir, Barlow	October 19, 1989, at The Spectrum	6:36
6.	"Bird Song"	Garcia, Hunter	December 9, 1989, at Great Western Forum	12:57
7.	"Let It Grow"	Weir, Barlow	March 14, 1990, at Capital Centre	11:55
Total length:				59:39

Disc two
No.	Title	Writer(s)	Recording date and venue	Length
1.	"China Cat Sunflower / I Know You Rider"	Garcia, Hunter / traditional, arr. Grateful Dead	April 1, 1990, at The Omni	10:24
2.	"Looks Like Rain"	Weir, Barlow	March 28, 1990, at Nassau Coliseum	8:04
3.	"Eyes of the World"	Garcia, Hunter	March 29, 1990, at Nassau Coliseum	16:14
4.	"Victim or the Crime"	Weir, Gerrit Graham	October 15, 1989, at Brendan Byrne Arena	8:04
5.	"Help on the Way / Slipknot! / Franklin's Tower"	Garcia, Hunter / Garcia, Keith Godchaux, Bill Kreutzmann, Phil Lesh, Weir / Garcia, Kreutzmann, Hunter	March 30, 1990, at Nassau Coliseum	19:07
6.	"One More Saturday Night"	Weir	March 24, 1990, at Knickerbocker Arena	4:51
7.	"Dear Mr. Fantasy"	Jim Capaldi, Steve Winwood, Chris Wood	April 1, 1990, at The Omni	5:44
Total length:				72:28

Note: The vinyl pressing puts "Bird Song" before "One More Saturday Night" instead of after "Cassidy"

=== Later releases ===
Title	Later released on
"Feel Like a Stranger"	Formerly the Warlocks
"Mississippi Half-Step Uptown Toodeloo"	Spring 1990 (The Other One)
"Let It Grow"	Spring 1990 (The Other One)
"China Cat Sunflower / I Know You Rider"	Spring 1990 (The Other One)
"Looks Like Rain"	Spring 1990 (The Other One)
"Dear Mr. Fantasy"	Spring 1990 (The Other One)
"Eyes of the World"	Spring 1990 (The Other One)
"Walkin' Blues"	Terrapin Station (Limited Edition)
"Althea"	Terrapin Station (Limited Edition)
"Help on the Way / Slipknot / Franklin's Tower"	Spring 1990

== Personnel ==
- Jerry Garcia – guitar, vocals
- Bob Weir – guitar, vocals
- Brent Mydland – keyboards, vocals
- Phil Lesh – bass guitar, vocals
- Bill Kreutzmann – drums
- Mickey Hart – drums

Additional musician

- Branford Marsalis – tenor and soprano saxophones on "Eyes of the World"

== Charts ==
Year	Chart	Position
1990	Billboard 200	43
