= Postcards of the Hanging =

Live album by The Grateful Dead
- Released: March 2002
- Recorded: June 10, 1973 – March 24, 1990
- Genre: Rock
- Length: 75:39 (bonus disc 10:14)
- Label: Grateful Dead / Arista / Rhino

The Grateful Dead chronology
Dick's Picks Volume 24 (2002)	Postcards of the Hanging (2002)	Dick's Picks Volume 25 (2002)

Professional ratings
Review scores
Source	Rating
AllMusic	3/5 stars
The Music Box	4/5 stars

Postcards of the Hanging is a compilation album by the Grateful Dead. It consists entirely of Bob Dylan covers, performed live in concert, along with a rehearsal performance of "Man of Peace" featuring the Grateful Dead backing Dylan himself. Bob Weir sings lead on five tracks, Jerry Garcia on three, and Phil Lesh on one ("Just Like Tom Thumb's Blues"); Weir and Garcia also alternate on one ("Maggie's Farm"). Another Dylan covers collection, Garcia Plays Dylan, includes several performances by the Grateful Dead, but mostly by the Jerry Garcia Band and other Garcia side projects. An album of live performances containing Dylan and the Grateful Dead performing together was released in 1989 as "Dylan & the Dead."

The title comes from the opening stanza of Dylan's "Desolation Row": "They're selling postcards of the hanging/ They're painting the passports brown."

== Content ==
Seven of the songs on the album originally appeared on the Dylan albums Bringing It All Back Home and Highway 61 Revisited; the remaining three represent Blonde on Blonde, John Wesley Harding, and the Leon Russell session that produced "Watching the River Flow" for the Greatest Hits II double-LP. Aside from being from among his most critically revered rock albums, the seven songs date from 1965, the year the long strange trip of the Grateful Dead began. The songs remained in the Dead's live rotation throughout their existence.

Conspicuously absent from the compilation is "Knockin' on Heaven's Door", a song the Dead performed more than 170 times. Conversely, "It Takes a Lot to Laugh, It Takes a Train to Cry" was performed a few times in the early 1990s, and only once in the 1970s – in the version included here, the Dead are accompanied by Dickey Betts and Butch Trucks, of the Allman Brothers Band. Dylan himself leads the band on the final track of the main disc, a rehearsal for the 1987 tour for which the Dead were his backing band.

== Track listing ==
All songs written by Bob Dylan

No.	Title	Recording date and venue	Length
1.	"When I Paint My Masterpiece"	October 11, 1989 at Meadowlands Arena	6:11
2.	"She Belongs to Me"	September 15, 1985 at Devore Field	7:20
3.	"Just Like Tom Thumb's Blues"	July 12, 1989 at RFK Stadium	4:29
4.	"Maggie's Farm"	October 3, 1987 at Shoreline Amphitheatre	6:13
5.	"Stuck Inside of Mobile with the Memphis Blues Again"	July 16, 1988 at the Greek Theatre	8:07
6.	"It Takes a Lot to Laugh, It Takes a Train to Cry"	June 10, 1973 at RFK Stadium	7:35
7.	"Ballad of a Thin Man"	April 1, 1988 at Meadowlands Arena	6:40
8.	"Desolation Row"	March 24, 1990 at Knickerbocker Arena	9:55
9.	"All Along the Watchtower"	July 4, 1989 at Rich Stadium	5:44
10.	"It's All Over Now, Baby Blue"	December 3, 1981 at Dane County Coliseum	7:23
11.	"Man of Peace"	June 9, 1987 at Veterans Memorial Auditorium	5:51

First edition bonus CD
No.	Title	Recording date and venue	Length
1.	"Queen Jane Approximately"	December 29, 1988 at Oakland Arena	6:12
2.	"Quinn the Eskimo (Mighty Quinn)"	December 30, 1985 at Oakland Arena	4:02

== Personnel ==
- Jerry Garcia – lead guitar, vocals
- Bob Weir – rhythm guitar, vocals
- Phil Lesh – bass guitar, vocals
- Brent Mydland – keyboards, organ, vocals (except track 6)
- Mickey Hart – drums (except track 6)
- Bill Kreutzmann – drums
- Keith Godchaux – piano (track 6)

=== Additional personnel ===
- Dickey Betts – guitar (track 6)
- Bob Dylan – acoustic guitar, vocals (track 11)
- Butch Trucks – drums (track 6)

=== Production ===
- John Cutler – engineer
- Bill Candelario – engineer
- Jeffrey Norman – mix
- David Gans – compilation producer
- David Lemieux – tape archivist
- Joe Gastwirt – mastering
- Geoff Gans – art direction
- Emily Burnham – illustration and design
- Cassidy Law – album coordination
- Ken Friedman – photography

== Charts ==
Album – Billboard

Year	Chart	Position
2002	The Billboard 200	120

== See also ==
- List of songs written by Bob Dylan
- List of artists who have covered Bob Dylan songs
