= Cassidy (song) =

Song by Bob Weir

from the album Ace
- Released: May 1972
- Recorded: January–March 1972
- Genre: Folk rock, Country rock
- Length: 3:41
- Label: Warner Bros. Records
- Composer: Bob Weir
- Lyricist: John Perry Barlow

"Cassidy" is a song written by John Barlow and Bob Weir and performed by the Grateful Dead, Ratdog, and Phil Lesh & Friends. The song appeared on Bob Weir's Ace, and the Grateful Dead's Reckoning and Without a Net albums.

The song was named after Cassidy Law, who was born in 1970 and was the daughter of Grateful Dead crew member Rex Jackson and Weir's former housemate Eileen Law. The lyrics also allude to Neal Cassady, who was associated with the Beats in the 1950s and the Acid Test scene that spawned the Grateful Dead in the 1960s. Some of the lyrics in the song were also inspired by the death of Barlow's father.

The song was quoted in the admiring and admirable obituary of Barlow in The Economist.

The song was first performed on March 23, 1974 at the Cow Palace in Daly City, California.

It is usually sung in two part harmony. On the Ace studio album version, Donna Jean Godchaux joins Weir on vocals. On the Reckoning and Without a Net versions, Weir sings with Brent Mydland.

== Cover versions ==
In 1991, Suzanne Vega recorded a version of this song on the album Deadicated.

The Grateful Dead released a live version on their 1981 album Reckoning, and another live version on their 1990 album Without a Net
