= The Music Never Stopped (album) =

Live album by Grateful Dead
- Released: May 30, 2025
- Recorded: 1969 – 1994
- Genre: Rock
- Length: 232:59
- Label: Rhino
- Producer: Grateful Dead

Grateful Dead chronology
Enjoying the Ride (2025)	The Music Never Stopped (2025)	Gratest Hits (2025)

The Music Never Stopped is a live album by the rock band the Grateful Dead, on three CDs or six LPs. It contains songs recorded in concert over 25 years, from 1969 to 1994. The tracks were selected from the 60-CD box set Enjoying the Ride, with at least one song from each of the 20 concert venues in the box set. It was released on May 30, 2025.

== Critical reception ==
On jambands.com, Kristopher Weiss said, "While Deadheads almost unanimously say they prefer full-show recordings over anything else, anyone who quibbles with the long, strange sonic trip that is The Music Never Stopped is simply looking to complain.... The producers were sympathetic and generous in the song selection... Bonus – the sound quality ranges from quite good to sublime."

== CD track listing ==
Disc 1
No.	Title	Writer(s)	Recorded	Length
1.	"The Music Never Stopped"	Bob Weir, John Perry Barlow	The Spectrum, Philadelphia, Pennsylvania; May 13, 1978	9:04
2.	"Althea"	Jerry Garcia, Robert Hunter	Hartford Civic Center, Hartford, Connecticut; March 14, 1981	8:37
3.	"Playing in the Band"	Weir, Mickey Hart, Hunter	Nassau Coliseum, Uniondale, New York; March 16, 1973	19:58
4.	"Hard to Handle"	Otis Redding, Al Bell, Allen Jones	Fillmore East, New York, New York; April 25, 1971	8:31
5.	"Wharf Rat"	Garcia, Hunter	Madison Square Garden, New York, New York; September 16, 1987	10:45
6.	"Doin' That Rag"	Garcia, Hunter, Phil Lesh	Fillmore West, San Francisco, California; June 5, 1969	6:59
7.	"My Brother Esau"	Weir, Barlow	Frost Amphitheater, Palo Alto, California; August 20, 1983	5:04
8.	"Deal"	Garcia, Hunter	Shoreline Amphitheatre, Mountain View, California; May 12, 1991	10:47

Disc 2
No.	Title	Writer(s)	Recorded	Length
1.	"Scarlet Begonias"	Garcia, Hunter	Greek Theatre, Berkeley, California; July 13, 1984	11:54
2.	"Touch of Grey"	Garcia, Hunter	Greek Theatre, Berkeley, California; July 13, 1984	6:50
3.	"Fire on the Mountain"	Hart, Hunter	Greek Theatre, Berkeley, California; July 13, 1984	12:08
4.	"Lazy Lightning"	Weir, Barlow	Alpine Valley Music Theatre, East Troy, Wisconsin; August 23, 1980	3:31
5.	"Supplication"	Weir, Barlow	Alpine Valley Music Theatre, East Troy, Wisconsin; August 23, 1980	6:19
6.	"Attics of My Life"	Garcia, Hunter	Boston Garden, Boston, Massachusetts; October 3, 1994	4:18
7.	"Estimated Prophet"	Weir, Barlow	Red Rocks Amphitheatre, Morrison, Colorado; August 12, 1979	13:55
8.	"Eyes of the World"	Garcia, Hunter	Red Rocks Amphitheatre, Morrison, Colorado; August 12, 1979	11:49
9.	"Brown-Eyed Women"	Garcia, Hunter	Winterland Arena, San Francisco, California; March 20, 1977	5:35

Disc 3
No.	Title	Writer(s)	Recorded	Length
1.	"Truckin'"	Garcia, Lesh, Weir, Hunter	Deer Creek Music Center, Noblesville, Indiana; July 15, 1989	8:26
2.	"Smokestack Lightnin'"	Howlin' Wolf	Deer Creek Music Center, Noblesville, Indiana; July 15, 1989	10:32
3.	"Big Boy Pete"	Don Harris, Dewey Terry	Henry J. Kaiser Convention Center, Oakland, California; November 21, 1985	3:08
4.	"Bird Song"	Garcia, Hunter	Music Hall, Boston, Massachusetts; September 15, 1972	12:11
5.	"Let It Grow"	Weir, Barlow	Hampton Coliseum, Hampton, Virginia; May 1, 1981	10:25
6.	"Black Muddy River"	Garcia, Hunter	Oakland Arena, Oakland, California; December 27, 1989	6:23
7.	"Days Between"	Garcia, Hunter	Capital Centre, Landover, Maryland; March 17, 1993	10:19
8.	"Not Fade Away"	Buddy Holly, Norman Petty	Capitol Theatre, Port Chester, New York; February 24, 1971	3:51
9.	"Goin' Down the Road Feeling Bad"	traditional, arranged by Grateful Dead	Capitol Theatre, Port Chester, New York; February 24, 1971	8:57
10.	"Not Fade Away"	Holly, Petty	Capitol Theatre, Port Chester, New York; February 24, 1971	2:26

== Personnel ==
Grateful Dead

- Jerry Garcia – guitar, vocals
- Bob Weir – guitar, vocals
- Phil Lesh – bass, vocals
- Bill Kreutzmann – drums
- Mickey Hart – drums (1969, 1977 – 1994 tracks)
- Ron McKernan – organ, harmonica, percussion, vocals (1969 – 1971 tracks)
- Tom Constanten – keyboards (1969 track)
- Keith Godchaux – keyboards (1972 – 1978 tracks)
- Donna Jean Godchaux – vocals (1972 – 1978 tracks)
- Brent Mydland – keyboards, vocals (1979 – 1989 tracks)
- Vince Welnick – keyboards, vocals (1991 – 1994 tracks)
- Bruce Hornsby – piano, accordion, vocals (1991 track)

N.B. The years above pertain only to the shows contained in this collection, not the band members' tenure; e.g. Brent Mydland played on the 1979 tracks, not the Godchauxs.

Production

- Produced by Grateful Dead
- Produced for release by David Lemieux
- Executive producer: Mark Pinkus
- Associate producer: Ivette Ramos
- Recording: Dan Healy, Betty Cantor-Jackson, John Cutler, Owsley Stanley, Kidd Candelario
- Mastering: Jeffrey Norman, David Glasser
- Tape restoration and speed correction: Jamie Howarth, John Chester
- Art direction: Ivette Ramos, Shannon Ward
- Design: Scott Robinson
- Cover art: Justin Helton
- Liner notes: Jesse Jarnow

== Charts ==
=== Weekly charts ===
Weekly chart performance for The Music Never Stopped
Chart (2025)	Peak position
Hungarian Physical Albums (MAHASZ)	13
