= Enjoying the Ride =

Live album and box set by Grateful Dead
- Released: May 30, 2025
- Recorded: 1969–1994
- Genre: Rock
- Label: Rhino
- Producer: Grateful Dead

Grateful Dead chronology
Dave's Picks Volume 54 (2025)	Enjoying the Ride (2025)	The Music Never Stopped (2025)

Grateful Dead concert box set chronology
Friend of the Devils: April 1978 (2024)	Enjoying the Ride (2025)	Summer Magic 1985 (2026)

Enjoying the Ride is a live album by the rock group the Grateful Dead. Packaged as a box set of 60 CDs and commemorating the band's 60th anniversary, it contains complete and partial recordings of concerts performed from 1969 to 1994. Housed in a faux wood box, it also includes a cassette tape, a numbered sticker, a paperback book, a poster, a map, several bumper stickers, a keychain, a fridge magnet, several reproductions of backstage passes, tickets, and a note for tapers, as well as an essay from the Owsley Stanley Foundation. It was released on May 30, 2025, in a limited edition of 6,000 copies.

An album of selections from the box set on three CDs or six LPs, titled The Music Never Stopped, was also released on May 30, 2025.

== Concerts ==
Enjoying the Ride contains recordings from 21 concert venues, comprising:

- 17 complete concerts – four of them with bonus tracks from different concerts at the same venues
- 3 recordings each compiled from two or three concerts from the same run of shows
- 1 bonus cassette of a partial concert

The recordings are:

- Avalon Ballroom, San Francisco, California – April 5, 1969 (on cassette)
- Fillmore West, San Francisco, California – June 5 / 7 / 8, 1969
- Capitol Theatre, Port Chester, New York – February 24, 1971
- Fillmore East, New York, New York – April 25 / 27, 1971 (Note: Other tracks from these shows were released on Ladies and Gentlemen... the Grateful Dead.)
- Music Hall, Boston, Massachusetts – September 15 / 16, 1972
- Nassau Coliseum, Uniondale, New York – March 16, 1973
- Winterland Arena, San Francisco, California – March 20, 1977
- The Spectrum, Philadelphia, Pennsylvania – May 13, 1978
- Red Rocks Amphitheatre, Morrison, Colorado – August 12, 1979
- Alpine Valley Music Theatre, East Troy, Wisconsin – August 23, 1980
- Hartford Civic Center, Hartford, Connecticut – March 14, 1981
- Hampton Coliseum, Hampton, Virginia – May 1, 1981
- Frost Amphitheater, Palo Alto, California – August 20, 1983
- Greek Theatre, Berkeley, California – July 13, 1984
- Henry J. Kaiser Convention Center, Oakland, California – November 21, 1985
- Madison Square Garden, New York, New York – September 16, 1987
- Deer Creek Music Center, Noblesville, Indiana – July 15, 1989
- Oakland Arena, Oakland, California – December 27, 1989
- Shoreline Amphitheatre, Mountain View, California – May 12, 1991
- Capital Centre, Landover, Maryland – March 17, 1993
- Boston Garden, Boston, Massachusetts – October 3, 1994

Enjoying the Ride includes bonus tracks from these concerts:

- Capitol Theatre – February 20, 1971
- Alpine Valley Music Theatre – July 11, 1981
- Capital Centre – September 15, 1982
- Henry J. Kaiser Convention Center – November 22, 1985

== Personnel ==
Grateful Dead

- Jerry Garcia – guitar, vocals
- Bob Weir – guitar, vocals
- Phil Lesh – bass, vocals
- Bill Kreutzmann – drums
- Mickey Hart – drums (1967 – 1971; 1974 – 1995)
- Ron "Pigpen" McKernan – keyboards, harmonica, percussion, vocals (1965 – 1972)
- Tom Constanten – keyboards (1968 – 1970)
- Keith Godchaux – keyboards (1971 – 1979)
- Donna Jean Godchaux – vocals (1972 – 1979)
- Brent Mydland – keyboards, vocals (1979 – 1990)
- Vince Welnick – keyboards, vocals (1990 – 1995)

Additional musicians

- Ned Lagin - Wurlitzer electric piano (September 16, 1972 concert) – "Dark Star", "Brokedown Palace"
- Clarence Clemons – saxophone (December 27, 1989 concert) – "Iko Iko", "Playing in the Band", "The Wheel", "I Need a Miracle"
- Bruce Hornsby – keyboards (May 12, 1991 concert) – full show

Production

- Produced by Grateful Dead
- Produced for release by David Lemieux
- Associate Producer: Ivette Ramos
- Recording:
  - Owsley Stanley (Fillmore West, Boston Music Hall)
  - Betty Cantor-Jackson (Capitol Theatre, Fillmore East, Winterland Arena, The Spectrum, Red Rocks Amphitheatre)
  - Kidd Candelario (Nassau Coliseum)
  - Dan Healy (Alpine Valley Music Theatre, Hartford Civic Center, Hampton Coliseum, Frost Amphitheater, Greek Theatre, Henry J. Kaiser Convention Center, Madison Square Garden, Deer Creek Music Center, Shoreline Amphitheatre, Capital Centre)
  - John Cutler (Oakland Arena, Boston Garden)
- Mastering: David Glasser, Jeffrey Norman
- Art Direction: Ivette Ramos and Shannon Ward
- Liner notes: Jesse Jarnow, David Lemieux, Owsley Stanley Foundation

== Track listing ==
=== Avalon Ballroom, San Francisco, CA ===
Cassette

Avalon Ballroom – April 5, 1969 – selections:
Side 1

1. "Dupree's Diamond Blues" > (Jerry Garcia, Robert Hunter)
2. "Mountains of the Moon" > (Garcia, Hunter)
3. "Dark Star" > (Garcia, Mickey Hart, Bill Kreutzmann, Phil Lesh, Ron McKernan, Bob Weir, Hunter)
4. "St. Stephen" (Garcia, Hunter)

Side 2

1. "Turn On Your Lovelight" (Joseph Scott, Deadric Malone)
2. "China Cat Sunflower" > (Garcia, Hunter)
3. "Doin' That Rag" (Garcia, Hunter)

=== Fillmore West, San Francisco, CA ===
Disc 1

Fillmore West – June 5, 1969 – selections:

1. "Morning Dew" (Bonnie Dobson, Tim Rose) – 10:01
2. "Me and My Uncle" (John Phillips) – 3:20
3. "Doin' That Rag" > (Garcia, Hunter) – 6:54
4. "He Was a Friend of Mine" (traditional, arranged by Grateful Dead) – 10:58
5. "Hard to Handle" (Otis Redding, Alvertis Isbell, Allen Jones) – 5:07
6. "Cosmic Charlie" (Garcia, Hunter) – 6:43
7. "Cryptical Envelopment" > (Garcia) – 2:11
8. "Drums" > (Hart, Kreutzmann) – 1:26
9. "The Other One" > (Weir, Kreutzmann) – 8:27
10. "Cryptical Envelopment" (Garcia) – 12:23

Disc 2

1. "China Cat Sunflower" (Garcia, Hunter) – 4:28
2. "Sitting on Top of the World" (Lonnie Carter, Walter Jacobs) – 4:40
3. "Dark Star" (Garcia, Hart, Kreutzmann, Lesh, McKernan, Weir, Hunter) – 20:59

Fillmore West – June 7, 1969 – selections:

4. "Dire Wolf" (Garcia, Hunter) – 4:30
5. "Dupree's Diamond Blues" (Garcia, Hunter) – 4:36
6. "Mountains of the Moon" (Garcia, Hunter) – 5:44
7. "Dark Star" (Garcia, Hart, Kreutzmann, Lesh, McKernan, Weir, Hunter) – 21:07

Disc 3

Fillmore West – June 8, 1969 – selections:

1. "Dancing in the Street" (William Stevenson, Marvin Gaye, Ivy Jo Hunter) – 12:57
2. "He Was a Friend of Mine" (traditional, arranged by Grateful Dead) – 12:15
3. "China Cat Sunflower" (Garcia, Hunter) – 4:22
4. "New Potato Caboose" (Lesh, Robert Petersen) – 13:50
5. "Me and My Uncle" (Phillips) – 3:17
6. "Cryptical Envelopment" (Garcia) – 2:30
7. "Drums" (Hart, Kreutzmann) – 0:58
8. "The Other One" (Weir, Kreutzmann) – 11:04
9. "Cosmic Charlie" (Garcia, Hunter) – 7:12

=== Capitol Theatre, Port Chester, NY ===
Disc 4

Capitol Theatre – February 24, 1971 – first set:

1. "Casey Jones" (Garcia, Hunter) – 5:50
2. "Me and My Uncle" (Phillips) – 4:32
3. "Cumberland Blues" (Garcia, Lesh, Hunter) – 5:24
4. "Next Time You See Me" (Bill Harvey, Earl Forest) – 3:58
5. "Bird Song" (Garcia, Hunter) – 8:19
6. "Me and Bobby McGee" – (Kris Kristofferson, Fred Foster) – 6:17
7. "Bertha" (Garcia, Hunter) – 5:52
8. "Hard to Handle" (Redding, Isbell, Jones) – 7:16
9. "Loser" (Garcia, Hunter) – 6:55
10. "Playing in the Band" (Weir, Hart, Hunter) – 4:58
11. "Good Lovin'" (Rudy Clark, Arthur Resnick) – 16:58

Disc 5

Capitol Theatre – February 24, 1971 – second set:

1. "Sugar Magnolia" (Weir, Hunter) – 7:31
2. "I'm a King Bee" (Isiah Moore) – 8:02
3. "Greatest Story Ever Told" (Weir, Hart, Hunter) – 4:13
4. "Johnny B. Goode" (Chuck Berry) – 4:01
5. "Deal" (Garcia, Hunter) – 4:57
6. "New Minglewood Blues" (traditional, arranged by Grateful Dead) – 5:14
7. "Truckin'" > (Garcia, Lesh, Weir, Hunter) – 8:57
8. "Not Fade Away" > (Norman Petty, Charles Hardin) – 3:43
9. "Goin' Down the Road Feeling Bad" > (traditional, arranged by Grateful Dead) – 2:19
10. "Not Fade Away" > (Petty, Hardin) – 2:19
11. "Turn On Your Love Light" (Scott, Malone) – 19:47

Disc 6

Capitol Theatre – February 20, 1971 – bonus tracks:

1. "Hard to Handle" (Redding, Isbell, Jones) – 8:16
2. "Cryptical Envelopment" > (Garcia) – 1:56
3. "Drums" > (Kreutzmann) – 3:50
4. "The Other One" > (Weir, Kreutzmann) – 10:43
5. "Wharf Rat" (Garcia, Hunter) – 7:25
6. "Ripple" (Garcia, Hunter) – 4:49
7. "Not Fade Away" > (Petty, Hardin) – 4:22
8. "Goin' Down the Road Feeling Bad" > (traditional, arranged by Grateful Dead) – 8:44
9. "Not Fade Away" > (Petty, Hardin) – 1:34
10. "Turn On Your Love Light" (Scott, Malone) – 24:51

=== Fillmore East, New York, NY ===
Disc 7

Fillmore East – April 25, 1971 – selections:

1. "Truckin'" (Garcia, Lesh, Weir, Hunter) – 8:43
2. "Loser" (Garcia, Hunter) – 7:08
3. "Hard to Handle" (Redding, Isbell, Jones) – 9:16
4. "Me and Bobby McGee" (Kristofferson, Foster) – 6:50
5. "Cold Rain and Snow" (traditional, arranged by Grateful Dead) – 6:41
6. "Ain't It Crazy (The Rub)" (Lightnin' Hopkins) – 4:06
7. "Playing in the Band" (Weir, Hart, Hunter) – 5:31
8. "Friend of the Devil" (Garcia, Hunter, John Dawson) – 3:53
9. "Casey Jones" (Garcia, Hunter) – 5:57
10. "Morning Dew" (Dobson, Rose) – 10:48
11. "Bertha" (Garcia, Hunter) – 6:01

Disc 8

1. "Good Lovin'" (Clark, Resnick) – 24:23
2. "Not Fade Away" > (Petty, Hardin) – 5:43
3. "Goin' Down the Road Feeling Bad" > (traditional, arranged by Grateful Dead) – 7:21
4. "Not Fade Away" (Petty, Hardin) – 3:28
5. "Uncle John's Band" (Garcia, Hunter) – 6:56

Fillmore East – April 27, 1971 – selections:

6. "Truckin'" (Garcia, Lesh, Weir, Hunter) – 8:55
7. "Mama Tried" (Merle Haggard) – 3:05
8. "Bertha" (Garcia, Hunter) – 6:28
9. "Next Time You See Me" (Harvey, Forest) – 4:17
10. "Cumberland Blues" (Garcia, Lesh, Hunter) – 4:26

Disc 9

1. "Me and Bobby McGee" (Kristofferson, Foster) – 6:21
2. "Loser" (Garcia, Hunter) – 7:19
3. "Hard to Handle" (Redding, Isbell, Jones) – 9:28
4. "China Cat Sunflower" (Garcia, Hunter) – 4:39
5. "I Know You Rider" (traditional, arranged by Grateful Dead) – 5:57
6. "Casey Jones" (Garcia, Hunter) – 6:21
7. "Sugar Magnolia" (Weir, Hunter) – 6:40
8. "Deal" (Garcia, Hunter) – 5:12
9. "Me and My Uncle" (Phillips) – 3:37
10. "Bird Song" (Garcia, Hunter) – 8:34
11. "Playing in the Band" (Weir, Hart, Hunter) – 5:15
12. "Dire Wolf" (Garcia, Hunter) – 3:47

=== Boston Music Hall, Boston, MA ===
Disc 10

Boston Music Hall – September 15, 1972 – selections:

1. "Promised Land" (Berry) – 4:04
2. "Sugaree" (Garcia, Hunter) – 8:12
3. "Greatest Story Ever Told" (Weir, Hart, Hunter) – 5:56
4. "China Cat Sunflower" > (Garcia, Hunter) – 8:32
5. "I Know Your Rider" (traditional, arranged by Grateful Dead) – 6:16
6. "Black Throated Wind" (Weir, John Perry Barlow) – 6:52
7. "Tennessee Jed" (Garcia, Hunter) – 8:06
8. "El Paso" (Marty Robbins) – 5:17
9. "Loser" (Garcia, Hunter) – 6:52
10. "Jack Straw" (Weir, Hunter) – 5:25
11. "Friend of the Devil" (Garcia, Hunter, Dawson) – 3:57

Disc 11

1. "Playing in the Band" (Weir, Hart, Hunter) – 17:43
2. "Casey Jones" (Garcia, Hunter) – 6:24
3. "He's Gone" (Garcia, Hunter) – 13:08
4. "Me and My Uncle" (Phillips) – 3:52
5. "Bird Song" (Garcia, Hunter) – 12:32
6. "Mexicali Blues" (Weir, Barlow) – 3:49
7. "Ramble On Rose" (Garcia, Hunter) – 6:16

Disc 12

1. "Truckin'" > (Garcia, Lesh, Weir, Hunter) – 11:26
2. "Drums" > (Hart, Kreutzmann) – 1:13
3. "The Other One: > (Weir, Kreutzmann) – 20:45

Boston Music Hall – September 16, 1972 – selections:

4. "Morning Dew" > (Dobson, Rose) – 11:35
5. "Dark Star" > (Garcia, Hart, Kreutzmann, Lesh, McKernan, Weir, Hunter) – 26:58
6. "Brokedown Palace" (Garcia, Hunter) – 5:30

=== Nassau Veterans Memorial Coliseum, Uniondale, NY ===
Disc 13

Nassau Coliseum – March 16, 1973 – first set:

1. "China Cat Sunflower" > (Garcia, Hunter) – 8:01
2. "I Know Your Rider" (traditional, arranged by Grateful Dead) – 6:13
3. "Jack Straw" (Weir, Hunter) – 5:02
4. "Wave That Flag" (Garcia, Hunter) – 6:56
5. "Looks Like Rain" (Weir, Barlow) – 7:56
6. "Ramble On Rose" (Garcia, Hunter) – 6:48
7. "Box of Rain" (Lesh, Hunter) – 5:26
8. "Beat It On Down the Line" (Jesse Fuller) – 3:33
9. "They Love Each Other" (Garcia, Hunter) – 6:08
10. "El Paso" (Robbins) – 5:08
11. "Row Jimmy" (Garcia, Hunter) – 8:34
12. "Mexicali Blues" (Weir, Barlow) – 3:47

Disc 14

1. "Bird Song" (Garcia, Hunter) – 12:01
2. "Playing in the Band" (Weir, Hart, Hunter) – 20:22

Nassau Coliseum – March 16, 1973 – second set:

3. "Promised Land" > (Berry) – 2:55
4. "Bertha" > (Garcia, Hunter) – 5:38
5. "Greatest Story Ever Told" (Weir, Hart, Hunter) – 5:37
6. "Loser" (Garcia, Hunter) – 7:21
7. "Big River" (Johnny Cash) – 4:40
8. "Don't Ease Me In" (traditional, arranged by Grateful Dead) – 3:25
9. "Me and My Uncle" (Phillips) – 3:35

Disc 15

1. "Dark Star" > (Garcia, Hart, Kreutzmann, Lesh, McKernan, Weir, Hunter) – 27:17
2. "Truckin'" > (Garcia, Lesh, Weir, Hunter) – 9:18
3. "Morning Dew" (Dobson, Rose) – 11:42
4. "Sugar Magnolia" (Weir, Hunter) – 9:11

=== Winterland, San Francisco, CA ===
Disc 16

Winterland Arena – March 20, 1977 – first set:

1. "New Minglewood Blues" (traditional, arranged by Grateful Dead) – 5:38
2. "Ramble On Rose" (Garcia, Hunter) – 8:51
3. "El Paso" (Robbins) – 4:49
4. "Deal" (Garcia, Hunter) – 6:20
5. "Cassidy" (Weir, Barlow) – 5:13
6. "Peggy-O" (traditional, arranged by Grateful Dead) – 8:22
7. "Beat It On Down the Line" (Fuller) – 4:31
8. "Brown-Eyed Women" (Garcia, Hunter) – 5:55
9. "Estimated Prophet" (Weir, Barlow) – 8:57
10. "Scarlet Begonias" (Garcia, Hunter) – 13:17

Disc 17

Winterland Arena – March 20, 1977 – second set:

1. "Samson and Delilah" (traditional, arranged by Weir) – 9:22
2. "Row Jimmy" (Garcia, Hunter) – 10:43
3. "Promised Land" (Berry) – 5:32
4. "St. Stephen" > (Garcia, Hunter) – 9:56
5. "The Other One" > (Weir, Kreutzmann) – 15:44
6. "Stella Blue" (Garcia, Hunter) – 9:17

Disc 18

1. "Around and Around" (Berry) – 9:23

Winterland Arena – March 20, 1977 – first encore:

2. "U.S. Blues" (Garcia, Hunter) – 7:22

Winterland Arena – March 20, 1977 – second encore:

3. "Terrapin Station" (Garcia, Hunter) – 11:46

=== Philadelphia Spectrum, Philadelphia, PA ===
Disc 19

The Spectrum – May 13, 1978 – first set:

1. "Jack Straw" (Weir, Hunter) – 6:46
2. "Dire Wolf" (Garcia, Hunter) – 4:36
3. "Beat It On Down the Line" (Fuller) – 3:41
4. "Peggy-O" (traditional, arranged by Grateful Dead) – 7:52
5. "El Paso" (Robbins) – 5:03
6. "Row Jimmy" (Garcia, Hunter) – 11:05
7. "New Minglewood Blues" (traditional, arranged by Grateful Dead) – 5:52
8. "Candyman" (Garcia, Hunter) – 8:34
9. "The Music Never Stopped" (Weir, Barlow) – 9:24

Disc 20

The Spectrum – May 13, 1978 – second set:

1. "Bertha" > (Garcia, Hunter) – 7:37
2. "Good Lovin'" (Clark, Resnick) – 7:11
3. "Terrapin Station" > (Garcia, Hunter) – 11:26
4. "Playing in the Band" > (Weir, Hart, Hunter) – 14:12
5. "Drums" (Hart, Kreutzmann) – 22:26

Disc 21

1. "Truckin'" > (Garcia, Lesh, Weir, Hunter) – 11:17
2. "Black Peter" > (Garcia, Hunter) – 10:40
3. "Sugar Magnolia" (Weir, Hunter) – 11:20

The Spectrum – May 13, 1978 – encore:

4. "One More Saturday Night" (Weir)

=== Red Rocks Amphitheatre, Morrison, CO ===
Disc 22

Red Rocks Amphitheatre – August 12, 1979 – first set:

1. "Promised Land" (Berry) – 4:46
2. "They Love Each Other" (Garcia, Hunter) – 7:27
3. "Mama Tried" > (Haggard) – 2:32
4. "Mexicali Blues" (Weir, Barlow) – 4:49
5. "Peggy-O" (traditional, arranged by Grateful Dead) – 8:59
6. "Lazy Lightning" > (Weir, Barlow) – 3:32
7. "Supplication" (Weir, Barlow) – 4:53
8. "Brown-Eyed Women" (Garcia, Hunter) – 5:19
9. "Looks Like Rain" (Weir, Barlow) – 7:57
10. "Althea" > (Garcia, Hunter) – 7:50
11. "Passenger" (Lesh, Peter Monk) – 5:00

Disc 23

Red Rocks Amphitheatre – August 12, 1979 – second set:

1. "China Cat Sunflower" > (Garcia, Hunter) – 5:21
2. "I Know Your Rider" (traditional, arranged by Grateful Dead) – 6:41
3. "Lost Sailor" (Weir, Barlow) – 6:59
4. "Don't Ease Me In" (traditional, arranged by Grateful Dead) – 4:06
5. "Estimated Prophet" > (Weir, Barlow) – 13:54
6. "Eyes of the World" > (Garcia, Hunter) – 19:35
7. "Drums" (Hart, Kreutzmann) – 10:03

Disc 24

1. "Space" > (Garcia, Lesh, Weir) – 5:09
2. "Not Fade Away" > (Petty, Hardin) – 13:53
3. "Black Peter" > (Garcia, Hunter) – 10:06
4. "Around and Around" (Berry) – 8:26

Red Rocks Amphitheatre – August 12, 1979 – encore:

5. "U.S. Blues" (Garcia, Hunter) – 5:25

=== Alpine Valley Music Theatre, East Troy, WI ===
Disc 25

Alpine Valley Music Theatre – August 23, 1980 – first set:

1. "Alabama Getaway" > (Garcia, Hunter) – 5:19
2. "Promised Land" (Berry) – 4:46
3. "Candyman" (Garcia, Hunter) – 7:56
4. "Me and My Uncle" > (Phillips) – 3:05
5. "Big River" (Cash) – 6:17
6. "Tennessee Jed" (Garcia, Hunter) – 9:32
7. "Lazy Lightning" > (Weir, Barlow) – 3:23
8. "Supplication" (Weir, Barlow) – 7:09
9. "Althea" (Garcia, Hunter) – 9:20
10. "The Music Never Stopped" (Weir, Barlow) – 8:12

Disc 26

Alpine Valley Music Theatre – August 23, 1980 – second set:

1. "Don't Ease Me In" (traditional, arranged by Grateful Dead) – 4:13
2. "Lost Sailor" > (Weir, Barlow) – 6:24
3. "Saint of Circumstance" > (Weir, Barlow) – 5:59
4. "He's Gone" > (Garcia, Hunter) – 20:49
5. "Drums" > (Hart, Kreutzmann) – 7:37
6. "Space" > (Garcia, Lesh, Weir) – 4:15
7. "Wharf Rat" > (Garcia, Hunter) – 10:14
8. "Around and Around" > (Berry) – 4:12
9. "Good Lovin'" (Clark, Resnick) – 8:03

Alpine Valley Music Theatre – August 23, 1980 – encore:

10. "One More Saturday Night" (Weir) – 4:40

Disc 27

Alpine Valley Music Theatre – July 11, 1981 – bonus tracks:

1. "Lost Sailor" > (Weir, Barlow) – 8:08
2. "Saint of Circumstance" > (Weir, Barlow) – 6:36
3. "Ship of Fools" (Garcia, Hunter) – 8:43
4. "He's Gone" > (Garcia, Hunter) – 13:37
5. "Truckin'" > (Garcia, Lesh, Weir, Hunter) – 15:19
6. "Drums" > (Hart, Kreutzmann) – 9:42
7. "Space" > (Garcia, Lesh, Weir) – 5:29
8. "The Other One" (Weir, Kreutzmann) – 4:24

=== Hartford Civic Center, Hartford, CT ===
Disc 28

Hartford Civic Center – March 14, 1981 – first set:

1. "Feel Like a Stranger" (Weir, Barlow) – 8:55
2. "Sugaree" (Garcia, Hunter) – 12:38
3. "Me and My Uncle" > (Phillips) – 2:53
4. "Big River" (Cash) – 5:48
5. "Peggy-O" (traditional, arranged by Grateful Dead) – 8:01
6. "C.C. Rider" (traditional, arranged by Grateful Dead) – 9:24
7. "Althea" (Garcia, Hunter) – 9:14
8. "Passenger" (Lesh, Monk) – 5:50
9. "China Cat Sunflower" > (Garcia, Hunter) – 5:44
10. "I Know You Rider" (traditional, arranged by Grateful Dead) – 6:28

Disc 29

Hartford Civic Center – March 14, 1981 – second set:

1. "Alabama Getaway" > (Garcia, Hunter) – 5:25
2. "Greatest Story Ever Told" (Weir, Hart, Hunter) – 4:47
3. "Ship of Fools" (Garcia, Hunter) – 9:06
4. "Lost Sailor" > (Weir, Barlow) – 6:23
5. "Saint of Circumstance" > (Weir, Barlow) – 6:59
6. "Drums" (Hart, Kreutzmann) – 12:54

Disc 30

1. "Space" > (Garcia, Lesh, Weir) – 2:50
2. "The Other One" > (Weir, Kreutzmann) – 5:28
3. "Stella Blue" > (Garcia, Hunter) – 10:06
4. "I Need a Miracle" > (Weir, Barlow) – 3:24
5. "Bertha" > (Garcia, Hunter) – 6:02
6. "Good Lovin'" (Clark, Resnick) – 7:57

Hartford Civic Center – March 14, 1981 – encore:

7. "One More Saturday Night" (Weir) – 4:40

=== Hampton Coliseum, Hampton, VA ===
Disc 31

Hampton Coliseum – May 1, 1981 – first set:

1. "Alabama Getaway" > (Garcia, Hunter) – 4:54
2. "Promised Land" (Berry) – 4:12
3. "Friend of the Devil" (Garcia, Hunter, Dawson) – 9:34
4. "Me and My Uncle" > (Phillips) – 3:01
5. "Big River" (Cash) – 6:10
6. "Althea" > (Garcia, Hunter) – 8:46
7. "Little Red Rooster" (Willie Dixon) – 9:45
8. "Tennessee Jed" > (Garcia, Hunter) – 8:54
9. "Let It Grow" > (Weir, Barlow) – 10:23
10. "Deal" (Garcia, Hunter) – 7:27

Disc 32

Hampton Coliseum – May 1, 1981 – second set:

1. "Feel Like a Stranger" (Weir, Barlow) – 9:58
2. "Franklin's Tower" > (Garcia, Kreutzmann, Hunter) – 11:30
3. "Lost Sailor" > (Weir, Barlow) – 6:02
4. "Saint of Circumstance" > (Weir, Barlow) – 6:31
5. "He's Gone" > (Garcia, Hunter) – 11:41
6. "The Other One" > (Weir, Kreutzmann) – 5:41
7. "Drums" (Hart, Kreutzmann) – 11:21

Disc 33

1. "Space" > (Garcia, Lesh, Weir) – 5:59
2. "The Wheel" > (Garcia, Hunter, Kreutzmann) – 5:51
3. "Wharf Rat" > (Garcia, Hunter) – 10:19
4. "Sugar Magnolia" (Weir, Hunter) – 8:53

Hampton Coliseum – May 1, 1981 – encore:

5. "U.S. Blues" (Garcia, Hunter) – 5:16

=== Frost Amphitheater, Stanford University, Palo Alto, CA ===
Disc 34

Frost Amphitheater – August 20, 1983 – first set:

1. "Alabama Getaway" > (Garcia, Hunter) – 5:41
2. "Greatest Story Ever Told" (Weir, Hart, Hunter) – 5:13
3. "They Love Each Other" (Garcia, Hunter) – 7:52
4. "New Minglewood Blues" (traditional, arranged by Grateful Dead) – 9:13
5. "Bird Song" (Garcia, Hunter) – 10:00
6. "Looks Like Rain" (Weir, Barlow) – 8:18
7. "Tennessee Jed" (Garcia, Hunter) – 7:56
8. "My Brother Esau" (Weir, Barlow) – 5:12
9. "Deal" (Garcia, Hunter) – 9:48

Disc 35

Frost Amphitheater – August 20, 1983 – second set:

1. "Shakedown Street" (Garcia, Hunter) – 14:03
2. "Man Smart, Woman Smarter" (Norman Span) – 7:27
3. "Ship of Fools" > (Garcia, Hunter) – 7:00
4. "Estimated Prophet" > (Weir, Barlow) – 13:57
5. "Eyes of the World" > (Garcia, Hunter) – 10:00
6. "Drums" (Hart, Kreutzmann) – 10:17

Disc 36

1. "Space" > (Garcia, Lesh, Weir) – 8:10
2. "The Other One" > (Weir, Kreutzmann) – 7:58
3. "Black Peter" (Garcia, Hunter) – 9:30
4. "Good Lovin'" (Clark, Resnick) – 10:43

Frost Amphitheater – August 20, 1983 – encore:

5. "One More Saturday Night" (Weir) – 5:07

=== Greek Theatre, University of California, Berkeley, CA ===
Disc 37

Greek Theatre – July 13, 1984 – first set:

1. "Bertha" > (Garcia, Hunter) – 6:51
2. "Greatest Story Even Told" (Weir, Hart, Hunter) – 4:01
3. "Dire Wolf" (Garcia, Hunter) – 3:06
4. "C.C. Rider" (traditional, arranged by Grateful Dead) – 8:54
5. "Loser" (Garcia, Hunter) – 7:05
6. "Cassidy" (Weir, Barlow) – 6:02
7. "Dupree's Diamond Blues" (Garcia, Hunter) – 7:09
8. "Hell in a Bucket" > (Weir, Barlow, Brent Mydland) – 7:26
9. "Might as Well" (Garcia, Hunter) – 4:35

Disc 38

Greek Theatre – July 13, 1984 – second set:

1. "Scarlet Begonias" > (Garcia, Hunter) – 12:08
2. "Touch of Grey" > (Garcia, Hunter) – 6:40
3. "Fire on the Mountain" > (Hart, Hunter) – 12:12
4. "Man Smart, Woman Smarter" > (Span) – 6:59
5. "Drums" > (Hart, Kreutzmann) – 8:25
6. "Space" (Garcia, Lesh, Weir) – 7:48

Disc 39

1. "The Wheel" > (Garcia, Hunter, Kreutzmann) – 5:50
2. "I Need a Miracle" > (Weir, Barlow) – 4:08
3. "Stella Blue" > (Garcia, Hunter) – 8:31
4. "Sugar Magonlia" (Weir, Hunter) – 10:11

Greek Theatre – July 13, 1984 – encore:

5. "Dark Star" (Garcia, Hart, Kreutzmann, Lesh, McKernan, Weir, Hunter) – 16:20

=== Henry J. Kaiser Convention Center, Oakland, CA ===
Disc 40

Henry J. Kaiser Convention Center – November 21, 1985 – first set:

1. "Big Boy Pete" (Don Harris, Dewey Terry) – 3:46
2. "Dire Wolf" (Garcia, Hunter) – 3:58
3. "Little Red Rooster" (Dixon) – 7:12
4. "Brown-Eyed Women" (Garcia, Hunter) – 5:32
5. "Me and My Uncle" > (Phillips) – 3:02
6. "Mexicali Blues" (Weir, Barlow) – 4:33
7. "Ramble On Rose" (Garcia, Hunter) – 6:41
8. "Looks Like Rain" > (Weir, Barlow) – 8:33
9. "Might as Well" (Garcia, Hunter) – 4:52

Henry J. Kaiser Convention Center – November 21, 1985 – second set:

10. "Shakedown Street" > (Garcia, Hunter) – 13:20
11. "Crazy Fingers" (Garcia, Hunter) – 7:20

Disc 41

1. "Playing in the Band" > (Weir, Hart, Hunter) – 12:16
2. "She Belongs to Me" > (Bob Dylan) – 8:50
3. "Drums" > (Hart, Kreutzmann) – 9:21
4. "The Other One" > (Weir, Kreutzmann) – 8:10
5. "Wharf Rat" > (Garcia, Hunter) – 8:40
6. "Playing in the Band" > (Weir, Hart, Hunter) – 1:49
7. "Gimme Some Lovin'" > (Spencer Davis, Steve Winwood, Muff Winwood) – 4:50
8. "In the Midnight Hour" (Steve Cropper, Wilson Pickett) – 5:08

Henry J. Kaiser Convention Center – November 21, 1985 – encore:

9. "Walking the Dog" (Rufus Thomas) – 5:18

Disc 42

Henry J. Kaiser Convention Center – November 22, 1985 – bonus tracks:

1. "Touch of Grey" (Garcia, Hunter) – 6:28
2. "Estimated Prophet" > (Weir, Barlow) – 10:39
3. "Eyes of the World" > (Garcia, Hunter) – 11:17
4. "Drums" > (Hart, Kreutzmann) – 11:00
5. "Space" > (Garcia, Lesh, Weir) – 5:58
6. "Morning Dew" > (Dobson, Rose) – 10:33
7. "Throwing Stones" > (Weir, Barlow) – 7:57
8. "Turn On Your Lovelight" (Scott, Malone) – 5:23
9. "Brokedown Palace" (Garcia, Hunter) – 5:33

=== Madison Square Garden, New York City, NY ===
Disc 43

Madison Square Garden – September 16, 1987 – first set:

1. "Touch of Grey" > (Garcia, Hunter) – 6:35
2. "Scarlet Begonias" (Garcia, Hunter) – 9:20
3. "Little Red Rooster" (Dixon) – 10:07
4. "Dire Wolf" (Garcia, Hunter) – 4:28
5. "My Brother Esau" (Weir, Barlow) – 4:56
6. "High Time" (Garcia, Hunter) – 7:18
7. "Let It Grow" > (Weir, Barlow) – 12:34
8. "Don't Ease Me In" (traditional, arranged by Grateful Dead) – 3:36

Disc 44

Madison Square Garden – September 16, 1987 – second set:

1. "Bertha" > (Garcia, Hunter) – 7:10
2. "Greatest Story Ever Told" > (Weir, Hunter) – 3:54
3. "Devil with the Blue Dress" / "Good Golly Miss Molly" / "Devil with the Blue Dress" > (Shorty Long, William Stevenson / Robert Blackwell, John Marascalco / Long, Stevenson) – 3:56
4. "He's Gone" > (Garcia, Hunter) – 13:48
5. "Drums" > (Hart, Kreutzmann) – 10:25
6. "Space" (Garcia, Lesh, Weir) – 10:44

Disc 45

1. "Truckin'" > (Garcia, Lesh, Weir, Hunter) – 7:00
2. "Wharf Rat" > (Garcia, Hunter) – 10:36
3. "Throwing Stones" > (Weir, Barlow) – 9:30
4. "Not Fade Away" (Petty, Hardin) – 12:27

Madison Square Garden – September 16, 1987 – encore:

5. "Black Muddy River" (Garcia, Hunter) – 7:01

=== Deer Creek Music Center, Noblesville, IN ===
Disc 46

Deer Creek Music Center – July 15, 1989 – first set:

1. "Bertha" > (Garcia, Hunter) – 7:30
2. "Greatest Story Ever Told" (Weir, Hart, Hunter) – 4:26
3. "Candyman" (Garcia, Hunter) – 6:53
4. "Walkin' Blues" (Robert Johnson, arranged by Weir) – 6:40
5. "Peggy-O" (traditional, arranged by Grateful Dead) – 8:06
6. "Queen Jane Approximately" (Dylan) – 7:30
7. "We Can Run" (Mydland, Barlow) – 5:47
8. "Bird Song" (Garcia, Hunter) – 13:54

Disc 47

Deer Creek Music Center – July 15, 1989 – second set:

1. "Foolish Heart" > (Garcia, Hunter) – 10:56
2. "Victim or the Crime" > (Weir, Gerrit Graham) – 7:50
3. "Crazy Fingers" > (Garcia, Hunter) – 9:07
4. "Truckin'" > (Garcia, Lesh, Weir, Hunter) – 8:03
5. "Smokestack Lightnin'" > (Chester Burnett) – 10:23
6. "Drums" (Hart, Kreutzmann) – 10:07

Disc 48

1. "Space" > (Garcia, Lesh, Weir) – 16:58
2. "China Doll" > (Garcia, Hunter) – 7:00
3. "All Along the Watchtower" > (Dylan) – 6:57
4. "Stella Blue" > (Garcia, Hunter) – 8:22
5. "Sugar Magnolia" (Weir, Hunter) – 10:22

Deer Creek Music Center – July 15, 1989 – encore:

6. "Brokedown Palace" (Garcia, Hunter) – 7:07

=== Oakland Coliseum Arena, Oakland, CA ===
Disc 49

Oakland Arena – December 27, 1989 – first set:

1. "Cold Rain and Snow" (traditional, arranged by Grateful Dead) – 6:38
2. "Greatest Story Ever Told" (Weir, Hart, Hunter) – 4:28
3. "Never Trust a Woman" (Mydland) – 7:15
4. "Althea" (Garcia, Hunter) – 8:04
5. "Me and My Uncle" > (Phillips) – 3:12
6. "Big River" (Cash) – 6:31
7. "Just Like Tom Thumb's Blues" (Dylan) – 5:14
8. "Bird Song" > (Garcia, Hunter) – 13:33
9. "Promised Land" (Berry) – 4:45

Disc 50

Oakland Arena – December 27, 1989 – second set:

1. "Iko Iko" (James Crawford, Barbara Hawkins, Rosa Hawkins, Joan Johnson) – 8:40
2. "Playing in the Band" > (Weir, Hart, Hunter) – 13:43
3. "Crazy Fingers" > (Garcia, Hunter) – 8:47
4. "Uncle John's Band" > (Garcia, Hunter) – 9:17
5. "Drums" > (Hart, Kreutzmann) – 11:04
6. "Space" > (Garcia, Lesh, Weir) – 9:32

Disc 51

1. "The Wheel" > (Garcia, Hunter, Kreutzmann) – 5:48
2. "I Need a Miracle" > (Weir, Barlow) – 4:00
3. "Morning Dew" (Dobson, Rose) – 13:38

Oakland Arena – December 27, 1989 – encore:

4. "Johnny B. Goode" > (Berry) – 4:04
5. "Black Muddy River" (Garcia, Hunter) – 6:25

=== Shoreline Amphitheatre, Mountain View, CA ===
Disc 52

Shoreline Amphitheatre – May 12, 1991 – first set:

1. "Picasso Moon" (Weir, Barlow, Bob Bralove) – 7:16
2. "Althea" (Garcia, Hunter) – 9:00
3. "C.C. Rider" > (traditional, arranged by Grateful Dead) – 3:33
4. "It Takes a Lot to Laugh, It Takes a Train to Cry" (Dylan) – 4:12
5. "El Paso" (Robbins) – 4:57
6. "High Time" (Garcia, Hunter) – 7:19
7. "Black Throated Wind" > (Weir, Barlow) – 6:05
8. "Deal" (Garcia, Hunter) – 10:58

Disc 53

Shoreline Amphitheatre – May 12, 1991 – second set:

1. "Help on the Way" > (Garcia, Hunter) – 4:15
2. "Slipknot!" > (Garcia, Keith Godchaux), Kreutzmann, Lesh, Weir) – 7:50
3. "Franklin's Tower" (Garcia, Kreutzmann, Hunter) – 16:38
4. "Looks Like Rain" > (Weir, Barlow) – 7:02
5. "Terrapin Station" > (Garcia, Hunter) – 24:10
6. "Drums" (Hart, Kreutzmann) – 10:38

Disc 54

1. "Space" > (Garcia, Lesh, Weir) – 11:50
2. "Goin' Down the Road Feeling Bad" > (traditional, arranged by Grateful Dead) – 8:26
3. "Throwing Stones" > (Weir, Barlow) – 8:34
4. "Turn On Your Lovelight" (Scott, Malone) – 7:56

Shoreline Amphitheatre – May 12, 1991 – encore:

5. "The Weight" (Robbie Robertson) – 5:42

=== Capital Centre, Landover, MD ===
Disc 55

Capital Centre – March 17, 1993 – first set:

1. "Shakedown Street" (Garcia, Hunter) – 12:56
2. "Wang Dang Doodle" (Dixon) – 6:34
3. "Lazy River Road" (Garcia, Hunter) – 7:18
4. "Desolation Row" (Dylan) – 11:20
5. "Ramble On Rose" (Garcia, Hunter) – 8:14
6. "Eternity" (Weir, Rob Wasserman, Dixon) – 9:03
7. "Liberty" (Garcia, Hunter) – 6:34

Capital Centre – March 17, 1993 – second set:

8. "Picasso Moon" (Weir, Barlow, Bralove) – 7:14

Disc 56

1. "Crazy Fingers" > (Garcia, Hunter) – 8:37
2. "Playing in the Band" (Weir, Hart, Hunter) – 7:33
3. "Dark Star" > (Garcia, Hart, Kreutzmann, Lesh, McKernan, Weir, Hunter) – 10:15
4. "Drums" > (Hart, Kreutzmann) – 8:49
5. "Space" > (Garcia, Lesh, Weir) – 12:07
6. "The Other One" > (Weir, Kreutzmann) – 5:52
7. "Days Between" > (Garcia, Hunter) – 10:11
8. "Good Lovin'" (Clark, Resnick) – 7:38

Capital Centre – March 17, 1993 – encore:

9. "Lucy in the Sky with Diamonds" (John Lennon, Paul McCartney) – 4:48

Disc 57

Capital Centre – September 15, 1982 – bonus tracks:

1. "Shakedown Street" > (Garcia, Hunter) – 15:18
2. "Lost Sailor" > (Weir, Barlow) – 7:03
3. "Saint of Circumstance" > (Weir, Barlow) – 3:57
4. "Drums" > (Hart, Kreutzmann) – 7:19
5. "Jam" > (Grateful Dead) – 6:51
6. "Not Fade Away" > (Petty, Hardin) – 9:00
7. "Stella Blue" (Garcia, Hunter) – 8:51
8. "Around and Around" > (Berry) – 3:55
9. "Good Lovin'" (Clark, Resnick) – 8:06
10. "Touch of Grey" (Garcia, Hunter) – 6:55

=== Boston Garden, Boston, MA ===
Disc 58

Boston Garden – October 3, 1994 – first set:

1. "Touch of Grey" > (Garcia, Hunter) – 7:49
2. "Beat It On Down the Line" (Fuller) – 3:13
3. "Loose Lucy" (Garcia, Hunter) – 7:43
4. "Little Red Rooster" (Dixon) – 8:21
5. "Childhood's End" (Lesh) – 4:19
6. "Dire Wolf" (Garcia, Hunter) – 3:20
7. "Black Throated Wind" (Weir, Barlow) – 5:53
8. "Bird Song" (Garcia, Hunter) – 13:27

Disc 59

Boston Garden – October 3, 1994 – second set:

1. "Box of Rain" (Lesh, Hunter) – 5:38
2. "Shakedown Street" (Garcia, Hunter) – 16:57
3. "Cassidy" > (Weir, Barlow) – 7:43
4. "Goin' Down the Road Feeling Bad" > (traditional, arranged by Grateful Dead) – 8:07
5. "Drums" (Hart, Kreutzmann) – 17:59

Disc 60

1. "Space" > (Garcia, Lesh, Weir) – 12:49
2. "The Wheel" > (Garcia, Hunter, Kreutzmann) – 4:51
3. "All Along the Watchtower" > (Dylan) – 6:37
4. "Attics of My Life" (Garcia, Hunter) – 4:14
5. "Around and Around" (Berry) – 9:14

Boston Garden – October 3, 1994 – encore:

6. "Brokedown Palace" (Garcia, Hunter) – 5:17
