= May 1977: Get Shown the Light =

Live album and box set by Grateful Dead
- Released: May 5, 2017
- Recorded: May 5–9, 1977
- Genre: Rock
- Label: Rhino
- Producer: Grateful Dead

Grateful Dead chronology
Dave's Picks Volume 22 (2017)	May 1977: Get Shown the Light (2017)	Cornell 5/8/77 (2017)

Grateful Dead concert box set chronology
July 1978: The Complete Recordings (2016)	May 1977: Get Shown the Light (2017)	Pacific Northwest '73–'74: The Complete Recordings (2018)

May 1977: Get Shown the Light is a live album by the American rock band the Grateful Dead. It contains four consecutive complete concerts, recorded on May 5, 7, 8, and 9, 1977, on eleven CDs. It was released on May 5, 2017.

The album was produced as a box set, in a numbered limited edition of 15,000 copies, and includes the previously unpublished book Cornell '77: The Music, the Myth and the Magnificence of the Grateful Dead's Concert at Barton Hall, by Peter Conners. It was also produced as an "all music edition" without the book.

The May 8 show, recorded at Barton Hall in Ithaca, New York, was also released on May 5, 2017 as a stand-alone album called Cornell 5/8/77. The May 9 concert at Buffalo Memorial Auditorium and the May 7 concert at Boston Garden were released separately on vinyl for Record Store Day in 2020 and 2023 respectively.

May 1977: Get Shown the Light was nominated for a Grammy Award for Best Boxed or Special Limited Edition Package. The artwork and package design are by Masaki Koike.

== Concerts ==
The album includes these concerts:

- May 5, 1977 – Veterans Memorial Coliseum, New Haven, Connecticut
- May 7, 1977 – Boston Garden, Boston, Massachusetts
- May 8, 1977 – Barton Hall, Ithaca, New York
- May 9, 1977 – Buffalo Memorial Auditorium, Buffalo, New York

== Critical reception ==
Professional ratings
Review scores
Source	Rating
Pitchfork	9.0/10

On Pitchfork, Jesse Jarnow said, "Though Cornell '77 is neither the Dead's most adventurous nor creative performance, it also remains arguably the Best Ever for several enduring reasons. Perhaps chief among them is that it is live Grateful Dead at its most accessible, with the Dead sounding vivid and tight and full of pep, characteristics shared by all four shows on May 1977: Get Shown the Light. Compared to most Grateful Dead shows, Cornell '77 (and its chronological neighbors) are excellent places for (some) newbie listeners to start."

== Track listing ==
=== May 5, 1977 – Veterans Memorial Coliseum, New Haven, Connecticut ===
Disc 1

First set:

1. "Promised Land" (Chuck Berry)
2. "Sugaree" (Jerry Garcia, Robert Hunter)
3. "Mama Tried" (Merle Haggard)
4. "El Paso" (Marty Robbins)
5. "Tennessee Jed" (Garcia, Hunter)
6. "Looks Like Rain" (Bob Weir, John Perry Barlow)
7. "Deal" (Garcia, Hunter)
8. "Lazy Lightning" > (Weir, Barlow)
9. "Supplication" (Weir, Barlow)
10. "Peggy-O" (traditional, arranged by Grateful Dead)
11. "The Music Never Stopped" (Weir, Barlow)

Disc 2

Second set:

1. "Bertha" (Garcia, Hunter)
2. "Estimated Prophet" (Weir, Barlow)
3. "Scarlet Begonias" > (Garcia, Hunter)
4. "Fire on the Mountain" > (Mickey Hart, Hunter)
5. "Good Lovin'" (Rudy Clark, Arthur Resnick)
6. "St. Stephen" > (Garcia, Phil Lesh, Hunter)
7. "Sugar Magnolia" (Weir, Hunter)

Encore:

8. "Johnny B. Goode" (Berry)

=== May 7, 1977 – Boston Garden, Boston, Massachusetts ===
Disc 1

First set:

1. "Bertha" (Garcia, Hunter)
2. "Cassidy" (Weir, Barlow)
3. "Deal" (Garcia, Hunter)
4. "Jack Straw" (Weir, Hunter)
5. "Peggy-O" (traditional, arranged by Grateful Dead)
6. "New Minglewood Blues" (traditional, arranged by Grateful Dead)
7. "Mississippi Half-Step Uptown Toodeloo" > (Garcia, Hunter)
8. "Big River" (Johnny Cash)
9. "Tennessee Jed" (Garcia, Hunter)
10. "The Music Never Stopped" (Weir, Barlow)

Disc 2

Second set:

1. "Terrapin Station" (Garcia, Hunter)
2. "Samson and Delilah" (traditional, arranged by Weir)
3. "Friend of the Devil" (Garcia, John Dawson, Hunter)
4. "Estimated Prophet" (Weir, Barlow)

Disc 3

1. "Eyes of the World" > (Garcia, Hunter)
2. "Drums" > (Hart, Bill Kreutzmann)
3. "The Wheel" > (Garcia, Hunter, Kreutzmann)
4. "Wharf Rat" > (Garcia, Hunter)
5. "Around and Around" (Berry)

Encore:

6. "U.S. Blues" (Garcia, Hunter)

=== May 8, 1977 – Barton Hall, Ithaca, New York ===
Disc 1

First set:

1. "New Minglewood Blues" (traditional, arranged by Grateful Dead) – 5:34
2. "Loser" (Jerry Garcia, Robert Hunter) – 7:58
3. "El Paso" (Marty Robbins) – 4:51
4. "They Love Each Other" (Garcia, Hunter) – 7:29
5. "Jack Straw" (Bob Weir, Hunter) – 6:29
6. "Deal" (Garcia, Hunter) – 6:10
7. "Lazy Lightning" > (Weir, John Perry Barlow) – 3:26
8. "Supplication" (Weir, Barlow) – 4:48
9. "Brown-Eyed Women" (Garcia, Hunter) – 5:49
10. "Mama Tried" (Merle Haggard) – 3:12
11. "Row Jimmy" (Garcia, Hunter) – 11:14

Disc 2

1. "Dancing in the Street" (William Stevenson, Marvin Gaye, Ivy Jo Hunter) – 16:32

Second set:

2. "Scarlet Begonias" > (Garcia, Hunter) – 11:15
3. "Fire on the Mountain" (Mickey Hart, Hunter) – 15:40
4. "Estimated Prophet" (Weir, Barlow) – 8:49

Disc 3

1. "St. Stephen" > (Garcia, Phil Lesh, Hunter) – 5:03
2. "Not Fade Away" > (Norman Petty, Charles Hardin) – 16:20
3. "St. Stephen" > (Garcia, Lesh, Hunter) – 1:54
4. "Morning Dew" (Bonnie Dobson, Tim Rose) – 14:17

Encore:

5. "One More Saturday Night" (Weir) – 5:10

=== May 9, 1977 – Buffalo Memorial Auditorium, Buffalo, New York ===
Disc 1

First set:

1. "Help On the Way" > (Garcia, Hunter)
2. "Slipknot!" > (Garcia, Keith Godchaux, Kreutzmann, Lesh, Weir)
3. "Franklin's Tower" (Garcia, Hunter)
4. "Cassidy" (Weir, Barlow)
5. "Brown-Eyed Women" (Garcia, Hunter)
6. "Mexicali Blues" (Weir, Barlow)
7. "Tennessee Jed" (Garcia, Hunter)
8. "Big River" (Cash)
9. "Peggy-O" (traditional, arranged by Grateful Dead)
10. "Sunrise" (Donna Jean Godchaux)
11. "The Music Never Stopped" (Weir, Barlow)

Disc 2

Second set:

1. "Bertha" > (Garcia, Hunter)
2. "Good Lovin'" (Clark, Resnick)
3. "Ship of Fools" (Garcia, Hunter)

Disc 3

1. "Estimated Prophet" > (Weir, Barlow)
2. "The Other One" > (Weir, Kreutzmann)
3. "Drums" > (Hart, Kreutzmann)
4. "Not Fade Away" > (Petty, Hardin)
5. "Comes a Time" > (Garcia, Hunter)
6. "Sugar Magnolia" (Weir, Hunter)

Encore:

7. "Uncle John's Band" (Garcia, Hunter)

== Personnel ==
Grateful Dead

- Jerry Garcia – guitar, vocals
- Donna Jean Godchaux – vocals
- Keith Godchaux – keyboards
- Mickey Hart – drums
- Bill Kreutzmann – drums
- Phil Lesh – bass
- Bob Weir – guitar, vocals

Production

- Produced by Grateful Dead
- Produced for release by David Lemieux
- Recording: Betty Cantor-Jackson
- Mastering: Jeffrey Norman
- Tape restoration and speed correction: Jamie Howarth, John Chester
- Packaging manager: Amanda Smith
- Art direction, design: Masaki Koike
- Photos: Doran Tyson, James R. Anderson, Lawrence Reichman, Peter Simon, John Reis, Dean John Smith
- Liner notes essay "Get Back Home where You Belong": David Lemieux
- Liner notes essay "The Road to Ithaca: Five Days in May": Nicholas G. Meriwether
- Hardcover book Cornell '77: The Music, the Myth, and the Magnificence of the Grateful Dead's Concert at Barton Hall: Peter Conners
- Executive producer: Mark Pinkus
- Associate producers: Doran Tyson, Ivette Ramos
- Tapes provided through the assistance of: ABCD Enterprises, LLC
- Tape research: Michael Wesley Johnson
- Archival research: UC Santa Cruz Grateful Dead Archive

== Charts ==
Chart (2017)	Peak position
US Billboard 200	33

== See also ==
- Dave's Picks Volume 50 – 2024 live release featuring music recorded at shows held on May 3 and May 4, 1977
