= Duke '78 =

Live album by Grateful Dead
- Released: September 20, 2024
- Recorded: April 12, 1978
- Venue: Cameron Indoor Stadium
- Genre: Rock
- Length: 176:19
- Label: Rhino
- Producer: Grateful Dead

Grateful Dead chronology
Friend of the Devils: April 1978 (2024)	Duke '78 (2024)	Dave's Picks Volume 52 (2024)

Duke '78 is a live album by the rock band the Grateful Dead. It contains the complete concert recorded at Cameron Indoor Stadium, on the campus of Duke University in Durham, North Carolina, on April 12, 1978. It was released on September 20, 2024, as a three-disc CD and a four-disc LP.

The April 12 concert recording was also released on September 20, 2024, as part of the eight-show, 19-CD box set Friend of the Devils: April 1978.

== Critical reception ==
In Glide Magazine, Doug Collette wrote, "Fortunately, the recording by Betty Cantor-Jackson is the usual definition of sonic clarity up and down the dynamic range (and all across the stereo spectrum as mastered by Jeffrey Norman). At the heart of the audio's impact, of course, is the playing of the band at large, and, with a day off from touring to follow immediately, the group often plays with unusual abandon..."

== Track listing ==
Disc 1

First set:

1. "Jack Straw" (Bob Weir, Robert Hunter) – 6:29
2. "Dire Wolf" (Jerry Garcia, Hunter) – 4:41
3. "Beat It On Down the Line" (Jesse Fuller) – 4:42
4. "Peggy-O" (traditional, arranged by Grateful Dead) – 8:54
5. "Mama Tried" > (Merle Haggard) – 2:29
6. "Mexicali Blues" (Weir, John Perry Barlow) – 4:03
7. "Funiculi Funicula" (Luigi Denza) – 1:57
8. "Row Jimmy" (Garcia, Hunter) – 10:50
9. "New Minglewood Blues" (traditional, arranged by Grateful Dead) – 5:47
10. "Loser" (Garcia, Hunter) – 8:59
11. "Lazy Lightning" > (Weir, Barlow) – 3:56
12. "Supplication" (Weir, Barlow) – 5:43

Disc 2

Second set:

1. "Bertha" > (Garcia, Hunter) – 7:50
2. "Good Lovin'" (Rudy Clark, Arthur Resnick) – 6:59
3. "It Must Have Been the Roses" (Hunter) – 8:55

Encore:

4. "U.S. Blues" (Garcia, Hunter) – 6:00

Disc 3

Second set, continued:

1. "Estimated Prophet" > (Weir, Barlow) – 12:02
2. "Eyes of the World" > (Garcia, Hunter) – 12:21
3. "Rhythm Devils" > (Mickey Hart, Bill Kreutzmann) – 25:54
4. "Truckin'" > (Garcia, Phil Lesh, Weir, Hunter) – 8:45
5. "Wharf Rat" > (Garcia, Hunter) – 10:38
6. "Around and Around" (Chuck Berry) – 8:20

== Personnel ==
Grateful Dead

- Jerry Garcia – guitar, vocals
- Donna Jean Godchaux – vocals
- Keith Godchaux – keyboards
- Mickey Hart – drums
- Bill Kreutzmann – drums
- Phil Lesh – bass, vocals
- Bob Weir – guitar, vocals

Production

- Produced by Grateful Dead
- Produced for release by David Lemieux
- Executive producer: Mark Pinkus
- Associate producer: Ivette Ramos
- CD mastering: Jeffrey Norman
- Recording: Betty Cantor-Jackson
- Tape restoration and speed correction: Jamie Howarth, John Chester
- Art direction, package design: Steve Vance
- Art direction, original art: Matthew Brannon
- Photos: James R. Anderson
- Liner notes: Steve Silberman, Eric Mlyn

== Charts ==
Chart performance for Duke '78
Chart (2024)	Peak position
Hungarian Albums (MAHASZ)	30
