= Friend of the Devils: April 1978 =

Live album and box set by Grateful Dead
- Released: September 20, 2024
- Recorded: April 6–16, 1978
- Genre: Rock
- Label: Rhino
- Producer: Grateful Dead

Grateful Dead chronology
Dave's Picks Volume 51 (2024)	Friend of the Devils: April 1978 (2024)	Duke '78 (2024)

Grateful Dead concert box set chronology
Here Comes Sunshine 1973 (2023)	Friend of the Devils: April 1978 (2024)	Enjoying the Ride (2025)

Friend of the Devils: April 1978 is a live album by the rock band the Grateful Dead. Packaged as a box set, it contains eight complete concerts on 19 CDs. It was released on September 20, 2024, in a limited edition of 10,000 copies.

Friend of the Devils: April 1978 contains recordings of these concerts:

- April 6, 1978 – Curtis Hixon Hall, Tampa, Florida
- April 7, 1978 – Hollywood Sportatorium, Pembroke Pines, Florida
- April 8, 1978 – Veterans Memorial Coliseum, Jacksonville, Florida
- April 10, 1978 – Fox Theatre, Atlanta, Georgia
- April 11, 1978 – Fox Theatre, Atlanta, Georgia
- April 12, 1978 – Cameron Indoor Stadium, Durham, North Carolina
- April 14, 1978 – Cassell Coliseum, Blacksburg, Virginia
- April 16, 1978 – Huntington Civic Center, Huntington, West Virginia

The box set also includes a 48-page booklet of liner notes and photos, as well as a wave drum.

The April 12 concert was also released on September 20, 2024, as a separate album called Duke '78, as a three-disc CD, a four-disc LP, and a digital download.

The April 15, 1978 concert, which is not included in Friend of the Devils, was released in 2021 as Dave's Picks Volume 37.

== Track listing ==
Disc 1

April 6, 1978 – Curtis Hixon Hall – first set:

1. "Bertha" > (Jerry Garcia, Robert Hunter) – 7:18
2. "Good Lovin'" (Rudy Clark, Arthur Resnick) – 6:24
3. "Dire Wolf" (Garcia, Hunter) – 4:38
4. "Me and My Uncle" > (John Phillips) – 3:08
5. "Big River" (Johnny Cash) – 6:27
6. "Friend of the Devil" (Garcia, John Dawson, Hunter) – 8:53
7. "Passenger" (Phil Lesh, Peter Monk) – 5:26
8. "Candyman" (Garcia, Hunter) – 8:14
9. "Lazy Lightning" > (Bob Weir, John Perry Barlow) – 3:29
10. "Supplication" (Weir, Barlow) – 4:31

April 6, 1978 – Curtis Hixon Hall – second set:

11. "Samson and Delilah" (traditional, arranged by Weir) – 9:19
12. "It Must Have Been the Roses" (Hunter) – 6:25

Disc 2

1. "Estimated Prophet" > (Weir, Barlow) – 12:50
2. "He's Gone" > (Garcia, Hunter) – 12:30
3. "Rhythm Devils" > (Mickey Hart, Bill Kreutzmann) – 7:21
4. "The Other One" > (Weir, Kreutzmann) – 16:15
5. "Wharf Rat" > (Garcia, Hunter) – 11:28
6. "Around and Around" (Chuck Berry) – 8:30

April 6, 1978 – Curtis Hixon Hall – encore:

7. "U.S. Blues" (Garcia, Hunter) – 5:57

Disc 3

April 7, 1978 – Hollywood Sportatorium – first set:

1. "Promised Land" (Berry) – 5:14
2. "Sugaree" (Garcia, Hunter) – 12:12
3. "Cassidy" (Weir, Barlow) – 5:32
4. "Tennessee Jed" (Garcia, Hunter) – 9:30
5. "Mama Tried" > (Merle Haggard) – 2:38
6. "Mexicali Blues" (Weir, Barlow) – 3:53
7. "Peggy-O" (traditional, arranged by Grateful Dead) – 10:37
8. "New Minglewood Blues" (traditional, arranged by Grateful Dead) – 6:24
9. "Loser" (Garcia, Hunter) – 8:12
10. "The Music Never Stopped" (Weir, Barlow) – 8:33

April 7, 1978 – Hollywood Sportatorium – second set:

11. "Jack Straw" (Weir, Hunter) – 7:08

Disc 4

1. "Ship of Fools" (Garcia, Hunter) – 9:54
2. "Good Lovin'" (Clark, Resnick) – 7:05
3. "Terrapin Station" > (Garcia, Hunter) – 11:27
4. "Playing in the Band" > (Weir, Hart, Hunter) – 9:14
5. "Rhythm Devils" > (Hart, Kreutzmann) – 11:00
6. "Not Fade Away" > (Norman Petty, Charles Hardin) – 10:24
7. "Black Peter" > (Garcia, Hunter) – 10:25
8. "Playing in the Band" (Weir, Hart, Hunter) – 5:48

April 7, 1978 – Hollywood Sportatorium – encore:

9. "Johnny B. Goode" (Berry) – 4:12

Disc 5

April 8, 1978 – Veterans Memorial Coliseum – first set:

1. "Mississippi Half Step Uptown Toodeloo" (Garcia, Hunter) – 11:44
2. "Me and My Uncle" > (Phillips) – 3:04
3. "Big River" (Cash) – 6:59
4. "They Love Each Other" (Garcia, Hunter) – 7:35
5. "Looks Like Rain" (Weir, Barlow) – 9:15
6. "Deal" (Garcia, Hunter) – 6:38
7. "El Paso" (Marty Robbins) – 5:06
8. "It Must Have Been the Roses" (Hunter) – 7:38
9. "Lazy Lightning" > (Weir, Barlow) – 3:47
10. "Supplication" (Weir, Barlow) – 5:31

Disc 6

April 8, 1978 – Veterans Memorial Coliseum – second set:

1. "Samson and Delilah" (traditional, arranged by Weir) – 8:28
2. "Scarlet Begonias" > (Garcia, Hunter) – 11:36
3. "Fire on the Mountain" (Hart, Hunter) – 12:19
4. "Estimated Prophet" > (Weir, Barlow) – 11:47
5. "Eyes of the World" (Garcia, Hunter) – 12:14

Disc 7

1. "Rhythm Devils" > (Hart, Kreutzmann) – 14:56
2. "Space" > (Garcia, Lesh, Weir) – 6:37
3. "Sugar Magnolia" (Weir, Hunter) – 11:32

April 8, 1978 – Veterans Memorial Coliseum – encore:

4. "One More Saturday Night" (Weir) – 5:37

Disc 8

April 10, 1978 – Fox Theatre – first set:

1. "Promised Land" (Berry) – 5:27
2. "Brown-Eyed Women" (Garcia, Hunter) – 5:59
3. "It's All Over Now" (Bobby Womack, Shirley Womack) – 8:29
4. "Peggy-O" (traditional, arranged by Grateful Dead) – 9:03
5. "Cassidy" (Weir, Barlow) – 6:02
6. "Dire Wolf" (Garcia, Hunter) – 4:33
7. "El Paso" (Robbins) – 5:05
8. "Row Jimmy" (Garcia, Hunter) – 10:02
9. "Passenger" (Lesh, Monk) – 5:58
10. "Candyman" (Garcia, Hunter) – 8:02
11. "The Music Never Stopped" (Weir, Barlow) – 9:44

Disc 9

April 10, 1978 – Fox Theatre – second set:

1. "Jack Straw" (Weir, Hunter) – 7:12
2. "Ship of Fools" (Garcia, Hunter) – 7:50
3. "Dancing in the Street" > (William Stevenson, Marvin Gaye, Ivy Jo Hunter) – 12:04
4. "Rhythm Devils" > (Hart, Kreutzmann) – 15:29
5. "Franklin's Tower" > (Garcia, Kreutzmann, Hunter) – 16:25
6. "Black Peter" > (Garcia, Hunter) – 11:50
7. "Around and Around" (Berry) – 8:18

Disc 10

April 11, 1978 – Fox Theatre – first set:

1. "Bertha" > (Garcia, Hunter) – 6:22
2. "Good Lovin'" (Clark, Resnick) – 5:46
3. "Friend of the Devil" (Garcia, Dawson, Hunter) – 8:51
4. "Me and My Uncle" > (Phillips) – 3:12
5. "Big River" (Cash) – 6:32
6. "Tennessee Jed" (Garcia, Hunter) – 9:04
7. "Looks Like Rain" (Weir, Barlow) – 8:08
8. "Brown-Eyed Women" (Garcia, Hunter) – 5:50
9. "New Minglewood Blues" (traditional, arranged by Grateful Dead) – 6:10
10. "Deal" (Garcia, Hunter) – 7:33

April 10, 1978 – Fox Theatre – encore:

11. "U.S. Blues" (Garcia, Hunter) – 6:10

Disc 11

April 11, 1978 – Fox Theatre – second set:

1. "Samson and Delilah" (traditional, arranged by Weir) – 8:20
2. "Scarlet Begonias" > (Garcia, Hunter) – 12:42
3. "Fire on the Mountain" (Hart, Hunter) – 10:42
4. "Sunrise" (Donna Jean Godchaux) – 4:13

Disc 12

1. "Terrapin Station" > (Garcia, Hunter) – 11:47
2. "Rhythm Devils" > (Hart, Kreutzmann) – 20:54
3. "Space" > (Garcia, Lesh, Weir) – 2:18
4. "Iko Iko" > (James Crawford, Barbara Ann Hawkins, Rosa Lee Hawkins, Joan Marie Johnson) – 10:23
5. "Sugar Magnolia" (Weir, Hunter) – 10:39

April 11, 1978 – Fox Theatre – encore:

6. "Johnny B. Goode" (Berry) – 4:17

Disc 13

April 12, 1978 – Cameron Indoor Stadium – first set:

1. "Jack Straw" (Weir, Hunter) – 6:29
2. "Dire Wolf" (Garcia, Hunter) – 4:41
3. "Beat It On Down the Line" (Jesse Fuller) – 4:42
4. "Peggy-O" (traditional, arranged by Grateful Dead) – 8:54
5. "Mama Tried" > (Haggard) – 2:29
6. "Mexicali Blues" (Weir, Barlow) – 4:03
7. "Funiculi Funicula" (Luigi Denza) – 1:57
8. "Row Jimmy" (Garcia, Hunter) – 10:50
9. "New Minglewood Blues" (traditional, arranged by Grateful Dead) – 5:47
10. "Loser" (Garcia, Hunter) – 8:59
11. "Lazy Lightning" > (Weir, Barlow) – 3:56
12. "Supplication" (Weir, Barlow) – 5:43

Disc 14

April 12, 1978 – Cameron Indoor Stadium – second set:

1. "Bertha" > (Garcia, Hunter) – 7:50
2. "Good Lovin'" (Clark, Resnick) – 6:59
3. "It Must Have Been the Roses" (Hunter) – 8:55

April 12, 1978 – Cameron Indoor Stadium – encore:

4. "U.S. Blues" (Garcia, Hunter) – 6:00

Disc 15

1. "Estimated Prophet" > (Weir, Barlow) – 12:02
2. "Eyes of the World" > (Garcia, Hunter) – 12:21
3. "Rhythm Devils" > (Hart, Kreutzmann) – 25:54
4. "Truckin'" > (Garcia, Lesh, Weir, Hunter) – 8:45
5. "Wharf Rat" > (Garcia, Hunter) – 10:38
6. "Around and Around" (Berry) – 8:20

Disc 16

April 14, 1978 – Cassell Coliseum – first set:

1. "Promised Land" (Berry) – 5:00
2. "Tennessee Jed" (Garcia, Hunter) – 8:45
3. "Me and My Uncle" > (Phillips) – 3:02
4. "Big River" (Cash) – 5:45
5. "Peggy-O" (Garcia, Hunter) – 8:18
6. "Looks Like Rain" (Weir, Barlow) – 8:53
7. "Dire Wolf" (Garcia, Hunter) – 4:44
8. "It's All Over Now" (B. Womack, S. Womack) – 8:03
9. "Dupree's Diamond Blues" (Garcia, Hunter) – 5:37
10. "The Music Never Stopped" (Weir, Barlow) – 8:51

April 14, 1978 – Cassell Coliseum – second set:

11. "Samson and Delilah" (traditional, arranged by Weir) – 7:35

April 14, 1978 – Cassell Coliseum – encore:

12. "Johnny B. Goode" (Berry) – 5:04

Disc 17

1. "Ship of Fools" (Garcia, Hunter) – 5:04
2. "Dancing in the Street" > (Stevenson, Gaye, Hunter) – 16:47
3. "Rhythm Devils" > (Hart, Kreutzmann) – 20:23
4. "Space" > (Garcia, Lesh, Weir) – 5:12
5. "The Other One" > (Weir, Kreutzmann) – 8:10
6. "Black Peter" > (Garcia, Hunter) – 10:58
7. "Sugar Magnolia" (Weir, Hunter) – 9:26

Disc 18

April 16, 1978 – Huntington Civic Center – first set:

1. "Jack Straw" (Weir, Hunter) – 6:18
2. "Dire Wolf" (Garcia, Hunter) – 4:37
3. "Cassidy" (Weir, Barlow) – 4:51
4. "Peggy-O" (traditional, arranged by Grateful Dead) – 8:04
5. "Mexicali Blues" > (Weir, Barlow) – 3:29
6. "Mama Tried" (Haggard) – 2:53
7. "They Love Each Other" (Garcia, Hunter) – 7:36
8. "New Minglewood Blues" (traditional, arranged by Grateful Dead) – 6:15
9. "Scarlet Begonias" > (Garcia, Hunter) – 9:59
10. "Fire on the Mountain" (Hart, Hunter) – 9:27

April 16, 1978 – Huntington Civic Center – second set:

11. "Samson and Delilah" (traditional, arranged by Weir) – 8:06
12. "Ship of Fools" (Garcia, Hunter) – 7:54

Disc 19

1. "Estimated Prophet" > (Weir, Barlow) – 12:33
2. "Eyes of the World" > (Garcia, Hunter) – 11:44
3. "Rhythm Devils" > (Hart, Kreutzmann) – 14:25
4. "Space" > (Garcia, Lesh, Weir) – 4:32
5. "Iko Iko" > (Crawford, B.A. Hawkins, R.L. Hawkins, Johnson) – 12:06
6. "Sugar Magnolia" (Weir, Hunter) – 10:23

April 16, 1978 – Huntington Civic Center – encore:

7. "U.S. Blues" (Garcia, Hunter) – 5:35

== Personnel ==
Grateful Dead

- Jerry Garcia – guitar, vocals
- Donna Jean Godchaux – vocals
- Keith Godchaux – keyboards
- Mickey Hart – drums
- Bill Kreutzmann – drums
- Phil Lesh – bass, vocals
- Bob Weir – guitar, vocals

Production

- Produced by Grateful Dead
- Produced for release by David Lemieux
- Executive producer: Mark Pinkus
- Associate producer: Ivette Ramos
- CD mastering: Jeffrey Norman
- Recording: Betty Cantor-Jackson
- Tape restoration and speed correction: Jamie Howarth, John Chester
- Art direction: Matthew Brannon, Steve Vance
- Artwork: Matthew Brannon
- Design: Steve Vance
- Photos: James R. Anderson, Brooks R. Johnson, Bob Minkin, John Rottet
- Liner notes: Steve Silberman, David Lemieux

== Charts ==
Chart performance for Friend of the Devils: April 1978
Chart (2024)	Peak position
US Billboard 200	196
