= Dave's Picks Volume 52 =

Live album by Grateful Dead
- Released: October 25, 2024
- Recorded: September 11, 1983
- Venue: The Downs at Santa Fe
- Genre: Rock
- Length: 200:45
- Label: Rhino
- Producer: Grateful Dead

Grateful Dead chronology
Duke '78 (2024)	Dave's Picks Volume 52 (2024)	Dave's Picks Volume 53 (2025)

Dave's Picks Volume 52 is a three-CD live album by the rock band the Grateful Dead. It contains the complete concert recorded on September 11, 1983, at The Downs at Santa Fe, in Santa Fe, New Mexico. It was produced as a limited edition of 25,000 copies and was released on October 25, 2024. It also includes three songs recorded the previous night at the same venue.

== Critical reception ==
On AllMusic, Timothy Monger said, "Most fans reported a glorious rainbow appearing behind the stage during the second set. Meteorological highlights aside, the music is lively and energetic with as-yet-unrecorded '80s staples like "Hell in a Bucket" and "West L.A. Fadeaway" peppering the generous set list."

In Glide Magazine, Doug Collette wrote, "Anyone who thought this archival series – or Dead Vault exhumations in general – were slipping into the doldrums in 2024 will be convinced otherwise by the time an approximately half-hour unfolds to conclude the third CD. Taken from the previous night at The Downs at Santa Fe, the Grateful Dead musicianship becomes increasingly informed with ingenuity and intensity."

== Track listing ==
Disc 1

First set:

1. "Alabama Getaway" > (Jerry Garcia, Robert Hunter) – 5:22
2. "Greatest Story Ever Told" (Bob Weir, Mickey Hart, Hunter) – 4:34
3. "Dire Wolf" (Garcia, Hunter) – 3:43
4. "Hell in a Bucket" – (Weir, John Perry Barlow, Brent Mydland) – 5:48
5. "West L.A. Fadeaway" (Garcia, Hunter) – 9:48
6. "Me and My Uncle" > (John Phillips) – 3:03
7. "Mexicali Blues" (Weir, Barlow) – 5:41
8. "Althea" – (Garcia, Hunter) – 7:18
9. "C.C. Rider" (traditional, arranged by Grateful Dead) – 8:08
10. "Might as Well" (Garcia, Hunter) – 4:37

Disc 2

Second set:

1. "Help on the Way" > (Garcia, Hunter) – 3:50
2. "Slipknot!" > (Garcia, Keith Godchaux, Bill Kreutzmann, Phil Lesh, Weir) – 7:25
3. "Franklin's Tower" (Garcia, Kreutzmann, Hunter) – 9:42
4. "Let It Grow" (Weir, Barlow) – 14:56
5. "He's Gone" > (Garcia, Hunter) – 10:52
6. "Drums" > (Hart, Kreutzmann) – 8:08
7. "Space" > (Garcia, Lesh, Weir) – 8:06

Disc 3

Second set, continued:

1. "Truckin'" > (Garcia, Lesh, Weir, Hunter) – 9:42
2. "Wang Dang Doodle" > (Willie Dixon) – 10:51
3. "Morning Dew" > (Bonnie Dobson, Tim Rose) – 10:09
4. "Around and Around" > (Chuck Berry) – 3:42
5. "Sugar Magnolia" (Weir, Hunter) – 11:02

Encore:

6. "U.S. Blues" (Garcia, Hunter) – 5:21

Bonus tracks – September 10, 1983:

7. "Cumberland Blues" (Garcia, Lesh, Hunter) – 7:23
8. "Playing in the Band" > (Weir, Hart, Hunter) – 12:12
9. "China Doll" (Garcia, Hunter) – 9:26

== Personnel ==
Grateful Dead

- Jerry Garcia – guitar, vocals
- Mickey Hart – drums
- Bill Kreutzmann – drums
- Phil Lesh – bass, vocals
- Brent Mydland – keyboards, vocals
- Bob Weir – guitar, vocals

Production

- Produced by Grateful Dead
- Produced for release by David Lemieux
- Executive producer: Mark Pinkus
- Associate producer: Ivette Ramos
- Recording: Dan Healy
- Mastering: Jeffrey Norman
- Art direction, design, cover art: Steve Vance
- Photos: Bob Minkin

== Charts ==
Chart performance for Dave's Picks Volume 52
Chart (2024)	Peak position
US Billboard 200	36
US Top Rock & Alternative Albums (Billboard)	7
