= Dave's Picks Volume 50 =

Live album by Grateful Dead
- Released: April 26, 2024
- Recorded: May 3, 1977
- Venue: The Palladium
- Genre: Rock
- Length: 235:07 (Bonus disc 77:30)
- Label: Rhino
- Producer: Grateful Dead

Grateful Dead chronology
From the Mars Hotel: The Angel's Share (2024)	Dave's Picks Volume 50 (2024)	Dave's Picks Volume 51 (2024)

Alternative cover
- Dave's Picks 2024 Bonus Disc

Dave's Picks Volume 50 is a three-CD live album by the rock band Grateful Dead. It features the complete concert recorded on May 3, 1977, at the Palladium in New York City, plus five bonus tracks from the first set of the following night's show at the same venue. The album was released on April 26, 2024, in a limited edition of 25,000 copies.

Some copies of the album include a bonus disc with all the songs from the second set of the May 4, 1977 concert at the Palladium.

== Critical reception ==
On AllMusic, Timothy Monger wrote: "Here we find the Dead on their spring 1977 tour, going all in on a fiery New York show at the Palladium. In addition to the beautifully mastered Betty Cantor-Jackson recording of the entire May 3rd show, there are also some highlights from the first set of the following night at the same venue.... Great playing and sunny vibes throughout."

== Track listing ==
Disc 1

First set:

1. "Promised Land" (Chuck Berry) – 5:04
2. "Bertha" (Jerry Garcia, Robert Hunter) – 7:42
3. "Me and My Uncle" (John Phillips) – 3:24
4. "Peggy-O" (traditional, arranged by Grateful Dead) – 8:39
5. "Jack Straw" (Bob Weir, Hunter) – 5:59
6. "Row Jimmy" (Garcia, Hunter) – 10:48
7. "Lazy Lightning" > (Weir, John Perry Barlow) – 3:28
8. "Supplication" (Weir, Barlow) – 4:58
9. "Deal" (Garcia, Hunter) – 7:28
10. "Good Lovin'" (Rudy Clark, Arthur Resnick) – 6:38
11. "Ship of Fools" (Garcia, Hunter) – 8:24
12. "The Music Never Stopped" (Weir, Barlow) – 7:05

Disc 2

Second set:

1. "Might as Well" (Garcia, Hunter) – 6:38
2. "Estimated Prophet" (Weir, Barlow) – 8:48
3. "Sugaree" (Garcia, Hunter) – 13:59
4. "Samson and Delilah" (traditional, arranged by Grateful Dead) – 7:06
5. "Friend of the Devil" (Garcia, Hunter, John Dawson) – 8:17

Bonus tracks – May 4, 1977:

6. "Mississippi Half-Step Uptown Toodeloo" (Garcia, Hunter) – 10:21
7. "Big River" (Johnny Cash) – 7:31
8. "They Love Each Other" (Garcia, Hunter) – 7:34
9. "It Must Have Been the Roses" (Hunter) – 7:05

Disc 3

Second set, continued:

1. "Eyes of the World" > (Garcia, Hunter) – 11:40
2. "Space" > (Garcia, Phil Lesh, Weir) – 3:13
3. "Wharf Rat" > (Garcia, Hunter) – 10:44
4. "Drums" > (Mickey Hart, Bill Kreutzmann) – 4:03
5. "Not Fade Away" > (Norman Petty, Charles Hardin) – 11:17
6. "Around and Around" (Berry) – 8:59

Encore:

7. "Uncle John's Band" (Garcia, Hunter) – 9:11

Bonus track – May 4, 1977:

8. "Dancing in the Street" (William Stevenson, Marvin Gaye, Ivy Jo Hunter) – 18:55

Dave's Picks 2024 Bonus Disc

May 4, 1977:

1. "Estimated Prophet" (Weir, Barlow) – 9:41
2. "Scarlet Begonias" > (Garcia, Hunter) – 9:16
3. "Fire on the Mountain" (Hart, Hunter) – 11:38
4. "Terrapin Station" > (Garcia, Hunter) – 9:38
5. "Playing in the Band" > (Weir, Hart, Hunter) – 17:58
6. "Comes a Time" > (Garcia, Hunter) – 11:24
7. "Playing in the Band" (Weir, Hart, Hunter) – 7:54

== Personnel ==
Grateful Dead

- Jerry Garcia – guitar, vocals
- Donna Jean Godchaux – vocals
- Keith Godchaux – keyboards
- Mickey Hart – drums
- Bill Kreutzmann – drums
- Phil Lesh – bass
- Bob Weir – guitar, vocals

Production

- Produced by Grateful Dead
- Produced for release by David Lemieux
- Executive producer: Mark Pinkus
- Associate producer: Ivette Ramos
- Recording: Betty Cantor-Jackson
- Mastering: Jeffrey Norman
- Art direction, design, cover art: Steve Vance
- Photos: Rob Bleetstein

== May 4, 1977 set list ==
The set list for the May 4, 1977 concert at the Palladium was:

- First set: "Mississippi Half-Step Uptown Toodeloo",^{[a]} "Big River",^{[a]} "They Love Each Other",^{[a]} "New Minglewood Blues",^{[c]} "It Must Have Been the Roses",^{[a]} "Cassidy",^{[c]} "Deal",^{[c]}, "Looks Like Rain",^{[c]} "Brown-Eyed Women",^{[c]} "Dancing in the Street"^{[a]}
- Second set: "Estimated Prophet",^{[b]} "Scarlet Begonias",^{[b]} "Fire on the Mountain",^{[b]} "Terrapin Station",^{[b]} "Playing in the Band,"^{[b]} "Comes a Time",^{[b]} "Playing in the Band"^{[b]}

^{[a]} appears on Dave's Picks Volume 50
^{[b]} appears on Dave's Picks 2024 Bonus Disc
^{[c]} appears on Dave's Picks Volume 53

== Charts ==
Chart performance for Dave's Picks Volume 50
Chart (2024)	Peak position
US Billboard 200	32
US Top Rock & Alternative Albums (Billboard)	7

== See also ==
- Grateful Dead Download Series Volume 1 – 2005 live release featuring shows recorded earlier in the Palladium run
- May 1977: Get Shown the Light and Cornell 5/8/77 – 2017 live releases featuring shows recorded days after this show
