= Dave's Picks Volume 53 =

Live album by Grateful Dead
- Released: January 31, 2025
- Recorded: October 2, 1976
- Venue: Riverfront Coliseum
- Genre: Rock
- Length: 194:19
- Label: Rhino
- Producer: Grateful Dead

Grateful Dead chronology
Dave's Picks Volume 52 (2024)	Dave's Picks Volume 53 (2025)	Dave's Picks Volume 54 (2025)

Dave's Picks Volume 53 is a three-CD live album by the rock band the Grateful Dead. In contains the complete concert recorded on October 2, 1976, at Riverfront Coliseum in Cincinnati. It was released on January 31, 2025, in a limited edition of 25,000 copies.

The album also includes five songs recorded on May 4, 1977, at the Palladium in New York City. The other songs from the Palladium concert can be found as bonus tracks on Dave's Picks Volume 50 and on the Dave's Picks 2024 Bonus Disc that was included with some copies of Volume 50.

Dave's Picks Volume 53 debuted at number 2 in the Billboard Top Album Sales chart, and at number 3 in the Top Rock Albums chart.

== Critical reception ==
On AllMusic, Timothy Monger said, "This October show, plucked from the Grateful Dead's second 1976 tour, showcases the spoils of the era with an intrepid mix of covers and endemic mid-'70s set staples like "Brown-Eyed Women" and "Promised Land".... A notable and very lengthy set-two jam segues from a lively "Dancing in the Street" through various twists and turns before concluding with a show-closing "Sugar Magnolia"."

In Glide Magazine, Doug Collette wrote, "For this performance from Riverfront Coliseum in Cincinnati, the sextet presents sixteen selections before any significant improvisations are made. However, to the group’s great credit, their self-restraint generates definite dividends through the economic concentration the psychedelic warriors apply to tunes like "Candyman". "

== Track listing ==
Disc 1

First set:

1. "Promised Land" (Chuck Berry) – 4:49
2. "They Love Each Other" (Jerry Garcia, Robert Hunter) – 7:01
3. "New Minglewood Blues" (traditional, arranged by Grateful Dead) – 5:17
4. "Row Jimmy" (Garcia, Hunter) – 10:02
5. "El Paso" (Marty Robbins) – 4:22
6. "Tennessee Jed" (Garcia, Hunter) – 9:10
7. "It's All Over Now" (Bobby Womack, Shirley Womack) – 6:23
8. "Brown-Eyed Women" (Garcia, Hunter) – 5:28
9. "Let It Grow" (Bob Weir, John Perry Barlow) – 12:48
10. "Might as Well" (Garcia, Hunter) – 6:06

Disc 2

Second set:

1. "The Music Never Stopped" (Weir, Barlow) – 6:59
2. "Candyman" (Garcia, Hunter) – 7:09
3. "Samson and Delilah" (traditional, arranged by Weir) – 7:48
4. "It Must Have Been the Roses" (Hunter) – 7:03
5. "Big River" (Johnny Cash) – 5:35
6. "Friend of the Devil" (Garcia, Hunter, John Dawson) – 8:59

Disc 3

Second set, continued:

1. "Dancing in the Street" (William Stevenson, Marvin Gaye, Ivy Jo Hunter) – 10:38
2. "Drums" (Mickey Hart, Bill Kreutzmann) – 2:46
3. "The Other One" (Weir, Kreutzmann) – 10:17
4. "Stella Blue" (Garcia, Hunter) – 11:25
5. "The Other One" (Weir, Kreutzmann) – 2:16
6. "Sugar Magnolia" (Weir, Hunter) – 9:08

May 4, 1977 – The Palladium, New York City:

7. "New Minglewood Blues" (traditional, arranged by Grateful Dead) – 5:42
8. "Cassidy" (Weir, Barlow) – 5:27
9. "Deal" (Garcia, Hunter) – 6:56
10. "Looks Like Rain" (Weir, Barlow) – 9:13
11. "Brown-Eyed Women" (Garcia, Hunter) – 5:28

== Personnel ==
Grateful Dead

- Jerry Garcia – guitar, vocals
- Donna Jean Godchaux – vocals
- Keith Godchaux – keyboards
- Mickey Hart – drums
- Bill Kreutzmann – drums
- Phil Lesh – bass, vocals
- Bob Weir – guitar, vocals

Production

- Produced by Grateful Dead
- Produced for release by David Lemieux
- Executive producer: Mark Pinkus
- Associate producer: Ivette Ramos
- Recording: Dan Healy; tracks from Palladium 5/4/77 recorded by Betty Cantor-Jackson
- CD mastering: Jeffrey Norman
- Art direction, design: Steve Vance
- Cover art: James Mazza
- Photo: Bob Minkin
- Liner notes: David Lemieux

== Charts ==
Chart performance for Dave's Picks Volume 53
Chart (2025)	Peak position
US Billboard 200	35
US Top Rock & Alternative Albums (Billboard)	5
