= Cornell 5/8/77 =

Live album by Grateful Dead
- Released: May 5, 2017
- Recorded: May 8, 1977
- Venue: Barton Hall (Ithaca, New York)
- Genre: Rock
- Length: 154:56
- Label: Rhino
- Producer: Grateful Dead

Grateful Dead chronology
| May 1977: Get Shown the Light (2017) | Cornell 5/8/77 (2017) | Long Strange Trip (2017) |

Cornell 5/8/77 is a live album by the American rock band the Grateful Dead, recorded on May 8, 1977, at Barton Hall, Cornell University, in Ithaca, New York. In 2011, the recording was selected for inclusion in the National Recording Registry of the Library of Congress.

== Background ==
The May 8, 1977, show is a fan favorite, and is widely considered to be one of the band's best performances. Tickets to attend the general admission concert cost $7.50 (equivalent to $40 in 2025), and the soundboard recording was made by longtime Grateful Dead audio engineer Betty Cantor-Jackson. During this tour, the Grateful Dead visited Ithaca's Moosewood Restaurant, "only to go unrecognized by the members of the collective."

Grateful Dead historian Blair Jackson described the Barton Hall concert as "Among the most collected, traded and downloaded concerts by any band ever. That's not hyperbole, either. The original, pristine recordings of this show started circulating among tape collectors shortly after the concert and quickly became a favorite of everyone."

Guitarist Bob Weir told Rolling Stone in 2017 that he did not specifically recall the Cornell show standing out from the rest of the tour, but said of the popularity of the tape, "I think that show became notable because there was a particularly good audience tape made of it. And that got around. I think it was the quality of the recording was good and the guy's location was excellent. And whoever it was that made that recording made every attempt to get it out there so that people could hear it. And he was wildly successful at that. So it became a very famous show for us."

The album of the show was released as a three-disc CD and as a five-disc LP on May 5, 2017, three days shy of the 40th anniversary of the original performance. The same recording was also released on May 5, 2017 as part of the four-concert, eleven-CD box set May 1977: Get Shown the Light.

== Critical reception ==
Professional ratings
Review scores
| Source | Rating |
|---|---|
| AllMusic | 5/5 stars |
| Jazzwise | 4/5 stars |
| Robert Christgau | (1-star Honorable Mention) |

Stephen Thomas Erlewine on AllMusic wrote, "Sourced from the original soundboard recordings by Betty Cantor-Jackson, the sound is colorful and vivid, an excellent complement to a prime Dead performance. What makes this such an exceptional performance isn't that it's the Grateful Dead at their most experimental... but at their warmest.... If this isn't the best Grateful Dead show ever – a hard thing to quantify – it's nevertheless at the sweet spot of providing hardcore Deadheads with plenty to savor while offering a good introduction for neophytes, which is more than enough to make it essential."

Robert Christgau wrote in a dismissive review of the album that the concert owes its "inflated rep" to the absence of "Drums" and "Space".

== Track listing ==
Disc 1

First set:

1. "New Minglewood Blues" (traditional, arranged by Grateful Dead) – 5:34
2. "Loser" (Jerry Garcia, Robert Hunter) – 7:58
3. "El Paso" (Marty Robbins) – 4:51
4. "They Love Each Other" (Garcia, Hunter) – 7:29
5. "Jack Straw" (Bob Weir, Hunter) – 6:29
6. "Deal" (Garcia, Hunter) – 6:10
7. "Lazy Lightning" > (Weir, John Perry Barlow) – 3:26
8. "Supplication" (Weir, Barlow) – 4:48
9. "Brown-Eyed Women" (Garcia, Hunter) – 5:49
10. "Mama Tried" (Merle Haggard) – 3:12
11. "Row Jimmy" (Garcia, Hunter) – 11:14

Disc 2

1. "Dancing in the Street" (William Stevenson, Marvin Gaye, Ivy Jo Hunter) – 16:32

Second set:

2. "Scarlet Begonias" > (Garcia, Hunter) – 11:15
3. "Fire on the Mountain" (Mickey Hart, Hunter) – 15:40
4. "Estimated Prophet" (Weir, Barlow) – 8:49

Disc 3

1. "St. Stephen" > (Garcia, Phil Lesh, Hunter) – 5:03
2. "Not Fade Away" > (Norman Petty, Charles Hardin) – 16:20
3. "St. Stephen" > (Garcia, Lesh, Hunter) – 1:54
4. "Morning Dew" (Bonnie Dobson, Tim Rose) – 14:17

Encore:

5. "One More Saturday Night" (Weir) – 5:10

== Personnel ==
Grateful Dead

- Jerry Garcia – guitar, vocals
- Donna Jean Godchaux – vocals
- Keith Godchaux – keyboards
- Mickey Hart – drums
- Bill Kreutzmann – drums
- Phil Lesh – bass
- Bob Weir – guitar, vocals

Production

- Produced by Grateful Dead
- Produced for release by David Lemieux
- Recording: Betty Cantor-Jackson
- Mastering: Jeffrey Norman
- Tape restoration and speed correction: Jamie Howarth, John Chester
- Packaging manager: Shannon Ward
- Poster art: Jay Mabrey
- Art direction, design: Masaki Koike
- Photos: John Reis, Doran Tyson, Michael Wesley Johnson, Lawrence Reichman
- Liner notes essay "Myth, Memory, Mystery, and the History of Cornell '77": Nicholas G. Meriwether
- Executive producer: Mark Pinkus
- Associate producers: Doran Tyson, Ivette Ramos
- Tapes provided through the assistance of: ABCD Enterprises, LLC
- Tape research: Michael Wesley Johnson
- Archival research: UC Santa Cruz Grateful Dead Archive

== Charts ==
| Chart (2017) | Peak position |
|---|---|
| Belgian Albums (Ultratop Wallonia) | 121 |
| Hungarian Albums (MAHASZ) | 35 |
| Italian Albums (FIMI) | 83 |
| Scottish Albums (Official Charts) | 67 |
| US Billboard 200 | 25 |

== See also ==
- Dave's Picks Volume 50 – 2024 live release featuring music recorded at shows held on May 3 and May 4, 1977
