= Dave's Picks Volume 51 =

Live album by Grateful Dead
- Released: July 26, 2024
- Recorded: April 13, 1971
- Venue: Scranton Catholic Youth Center
- Genre: Rock
- Length: 222:07
- Label: Rhino
- Producer: Grateful Dead

Grateful Dead chronology
Dave's Picks Volume 50 (2024)	Dave's Picks Volume 51 (2024)	Friend of the Devils: April 1978 (2024)

Dave's Picks Volume 51 is a three-CD live album by the rock band Grateful Dead. It features the complete concert recorded on April 13, 1971, at the Scranton Catholic Youth Center in Scranton, Pennsylvania. Dave's Picks Volume 51 was released on July 26, 2024, in a limited edition of 25,000 copies.

The cover art, designed by Steve Vance, is a nod to the American TV show The Office, which was set in the concert's location of Scranton.

The release also includes bonus tracks comprising the previous night's second set at the Civic Arena in Pittsburgh, Pennsylvania, as well as tracks from October 24, 1970, at Kiel Opera House in St. Louis, Missouri. The remaining songs from the St. Louis performance were included as bonus tracks on Dave's Picks Volume 48.

== Critical reception ==
On AllMusic, Timothy Monger wrote: "After a couple volumes devoted to late-'70s and '80s classics, Dave's Picks returns to the source with a spring 1971 show featuring the original Grateful Dead quintet of Jerry Garcia, Bob Weir, Phil Lesh, Bill Kreutzmann, and Ron "Pigpen" McKernan.... Fans of classic era Dead will enjoy hearing Pigpen still in his prime on this nimble and focused volume."

In Glide Magazine, Doug Collette said, "Most songs that would grace the Skull & Roses double LP released that autumn are featured in these setlists.... With their range of choices for Dave's 51, the curators seem to say improvisation took many forms within the oeuvre of the Grateful Dead. There certainly isn’t much extensive jamming on the first set of 4/13, but the second set is perfectly scintillating from start to finish."

== Track listing ==
Disc 1

First set:

1. "Casey Jones" (Jerry Garcia, Robert Hunter) – 5:38
2. "Mama Tried" (Merle Haggard) – 3:20
3. "Loser" (Garcia, Hunter) – 7:06
4. "Big Boss Man" (Luther Dixon, Al Smith) – 5:46
5. "Me and Bobby McGee" (Fred Foster, Kris Kristofferson) – 6:18
6. "Bertha" (Garcia, Hunter) – 6:25
7. "Cumberland Blues" (Garcia, Phil Lesh, Hunter) – 4:56
8. "Big Railroad Blues" (Noah Lewis, arranged by Grateful Dead) – 5:08
9. "Playing in the Band" (Weir, Mickey Hart, Hunter) – 5:09
10. "Hard to Handle" (Otis Redding, Alvertis Isbell, Allen Jones) – 9:10
11. "Sugar Magnolia" (Weir, Hunter) – 6:47

Disc 2

Second set:

1. "Truckin'" > (Garcia, Lesh, Weir, Hunter) – 9:05
2. "Drums" > (Hart, Bill Kreutzmann) – 4:25
3. "Good Lovin'" (Rudy Clark, Arthur Resnick) – 18:55
4. "I Second That Emotion" (Al Cleveland, Smokey Robinson) – 5:44
5. "Greatest Story Ever Told" > (Weir, Hart, Hunter) – 2:41
6. "Johnny B. Goode" (Chuck Berry) – 3:56
7. "Uncle John's Band" (Garcia, Hunter) – 6:31

Bonus tracks – October 24, 1970 – Kiel Opera House:

8. "Me and My Uncle" (John Phillips) – 4:21
9. "Friend of the Devil" (Garcia, Hunter, John Dawson) – 4:06
10. "Cold Rain and Snow" (traditional, arranged by Grateful Dead) – 6:51
11. "Attics of My Life" (Garcia, Hunter) – 6:28
12. "Casey Jones" (Garcia, Hunter) – 4:51

Disc 3

Bonus tracks – April 12, 1971 – Civic Arena:

1. "Truckin'" > (Garcia, Lesh, Weir, Hunter) – 8:36
2. "Drums" > (Hart, Kreutzmann) – 3:15
3. "The Other One" > (Weir, Kreutzmann) – 10:46
4. "Wharf Rat" (Garcia, Hunter) – 9:39
5. "Me and Bobby McGee" (Foster, Kristofferson) – 6:01
6. "Casey Jones" (Garcia, Hunter) – 5:39
7. "Sugar Magnolia" (Weir, Hunter) – 7:01
8. "Deal" > (Garcia, Hunter) – 4:46
9. "Not Fade Away" > (Norman Petty, Charles Hardin) – 4:07
10. "Goin' Down the Road Feeling Bad" > (traditional, arranged by Grateful Dead) – 7:09
11. "Turn On Your Lovelight" (Joseph Scott, Deadric Malone) – 11:31

== Personnel ==
Grateful Dead

- Jerry Garcia – guitar, vocals
- Bill Kreutzmann – drums
- Phil Lesh – bass
- Ron "Pigpen" McKernan – keyboards, harmonica, vocals
- Bob Weir – guitar, vocals
- Mickey Hart – drums (disc 2 tracks 8–12)

Production

- Produced by Grateful Dead
- Produced for release by David Lemieux
- Executive producer: Mark Pinkus
- Associate producer: Ivette Ramos
- Recording: Rex Jackson
- Mastering: Jeffrey Norman
- Art direction, design, cover art: Steve Vance
- Photos: Peter Corrigan

== Charts ==
Chart performance for Dave's Picks Volume 51
Chart (2024)	Peak position
US Billboard 200	31
US Top Rock & Alternative Albums (Billboard)	10
