= Dave's Picks Volume 54 =

Live album by Grateful Dead
- Released: April 25, 2025
- Recorded: March 26, 1973
- Venue: Baltimore Civic Center
- Genre: Rock
- Length: 232:46 (Bonus disc 77:03)
- Label: Rhino
- Producer: Grateful Dead

Grateful Dead chronology
Dave's Picks Volume 53 (2025)	Dave's Picks Volume 54 (2025)	Enjoying the Ride (2025)

Alternative cover
- Dave's Picks 2025 Bonus Disc

Dave's Picks Volume 54 is a three-CD live album by the rock band the Grateful Dead. It contains the complete concert recorded on March 26, 1973, at the Baltimore Civic Center in Baltimore, Maryland. It was released on April 25, 2025, in a limited edition of 25,000 copies.

Some copies of the album include a bonus disc with songs from the March 31, 1973 concert at Buffalo Memorial Auditorium in Buffalo, New York.

Dave's Picks Volume 54 debuted at number 2 on the Billboard Top Album Sales chart.

== Critical reception ==
In Glide Magazine, Doug Collette wrote, "Just past the half-century mark of entries in this ongoing archival series, the curators of Dave's Picks may have outdone themselves with Volume 54. The bonus disc itself is a veritable microcosm of the main performance, a never-before-released show from Baltimore, Maryland, that is arguably the definitive release of the whole vault enterprise."

== Track listing ==
Disc 1

First set:

1. "Promised Land" (Chuck Berry) – 3:30
2. "Mississippi Half-Step Uptown Toodeloo" (Jerry Garcia, Robert Hunter) – 7:47
3. "The Race Is On" (Don Rollins) – 3:35
4. "Wave That Flag" (Garcia, Hunter) – 6:25
5. "Jack Straw" (Bob Weir, Hunter) – 5:02
6. "Sugaree" (Garcia, Hunter) – 7:41
7. "Mexicali Blues" (Weir, John Perry Barlow) – 3:46
8. "Box of Rain" (Phil Lesh, Hunter) – 5:05
9. "Row Jimmy" (Garcia, Hunter) – 8:29
10. "Beat It On Down the Line" (Jesse Fuller) – 3:53
11. "Brown-Eyed Women" (Garcia, Hunter) – 5:43
12. "El Paso" (Marty Robbins) – 5:00
13. "China Cat Sunflower" > (Garcia, Hunter) – 7:10
14. "I Know You Rider" (traditional, arranged by Grateful Dead) – 5:03

Disc 2:

First set, continued:

1. "Looks Like Rain" (Weir, Barlow) – 7:16
2. "Don't Ease Me In" (traditional, arranged by Grateful Dead) – 3:57
3. "Playing in the Band" (Weir, Mickey Hart, Hunter) – 19:49

Second set:

4. Wolfman Jack introduces the band – 1:19
5. "Ramble On Rose" (Garcia, Hunter) – 7:01
6. "Big River" (Johnny Cash) – 4:50
7. "Here Comes Sunshine" (Garcia, Hunter) – 8:35
8. "Greatest Story Ever Told" (Weir, Hart, Hunter) – 5:40
9. "Candyman" (Garcia, Hunter) – 7:49
10. "Me and My Uncle" (John Phillips) – 3:09

Second set, conclusion:

11. "One More Saturday Night" (Weir) – 5:06

Disc 3:

Second set, continued:

1. "He's Gone" > (Garcia, Hunter) – 14:12
2. "Truckin'" > (Garcia, Lesh, Weir, Hunter) – 15:19
3. "Weather Report Suite: Prelude" > (Weir) – 2:03
4. "Jam" > (Grateful Dead) – 6:06
5. "Wharf Rat" > (Garcia, Hunter) – 9:50
6. "Me and Bobby McGee" > (Kris Kristofferson, Fred Foster) – 5:29
7. "Eyes of the World" > (Garcia, Hunter) – 14:18
8. "Morning Dew" (Bonnie Dobson, Tim Rose) – 12:40

Dave's Picks 2025 Bonus Disc

March 31, 1973 – Buffalo Memorial Auditorium – selections:

1. "Playing in the Band" (Weir, Hart, Hunter) – 17:13
2. "He's Gone" > (Garcia, Hunter) – 12:54
3. "Truckin'" > (Garcia, Lesh, Weir, Hunter) – 9:56
4. "Drums" > (Bill Kreutzmann) – 1:42
5. "The Other One" > (Weir, Kreutzmann) – 11:37
6. "Jam" > (Grateful Dead) – 7:16
7. "I Know You Rider" (traditional, arranged by Grateful Dead) – 7:24
8. "Sugar Magnolia" (Weir, Hunter) – 9:00

== Personnel ==
Grateful Dead

- Jerry Garcia – guitar, vocals
- Donna Jean Godchaux – vocals
- Keith Godchaux – keyboards
- Bill Kreutzmann – drums
- Phil Lesh – bass, vocals
- Bob Weir – guitar, vocals

Production

- Produced by Grateful Dead
- Produced for release by David Lemieux
- Executive producer: Mark Pinkus
- Associate producer: Ivette Ramos
- Recording: Kidd Candelario
- Mastering: Jeffrey Norman
- Art direction, design: Steve Vance
- Cover art: James Mazza
- Photos: David Cornwell

== Charts ==
Chart performance for Dave's Picks Volume 54
Chart (2025)	Peak position
US Billboard 200	35
US Top Rock & Alternative Albums (Billboard)	6
