= Al Jarnow =

American artist, animator, sculptor and filmmaker

Al Jarnow (born 1945) is an American artist, animator, sculptor, and filmmaker.

== Early life and education ==
He was born in Brooklyn in 1945.

He attended the Dartmouth College and the Brooklyn Museum Art School.

== Career ==
Jarnow made his first animated film, “The Owl & the Pussycat,” in 1968. He made his first short film for Sesame Street in 1970. Between the 1970s and the 1990s, Jarnow produced and/or directed over 100 short films for Sesame Workshop, including "Yak", "Orange", "Floor Tiles", "Perspectives", "Litter Rap", "One Thousand Faces", "Real Cats Drink Milk", "Three Primary Colors", "Rap Animation Numbers", and "Box City Recycling Rap".

Jarnow's films use stop-motion, timelapse, cell animation, and other experimental techniques to bring everyday objects to life and illustrate scientific concepts by blending education and entertainment.

Jarnow has also been a cover artist for Alfred Hitchcock's Mystery Magazine and Agatha Christie titles. His artwork has been display at New York City's Museum of Modern Art and the Pompidou Center in Paris.

He is an expert in the design of children's museums. He has created exhibits for such institutions as The National Gallery of Art, Science World (Vancouver), Brooklyn Children's Museum, Long Island Maritime Museum, San Francisco Exploratorium, Sag Harbor Whaling Museum, Three Village Historical Society, and the DAR Museum. He is one of the founders and designers of the Long Island Children's Museum.

2010 saw the release of Celestial Navigations, a DVD released by The Numero Group compiling Jarnow's short films.

== Personal life ==
Jarnow lives in Northport, New York. He is the father of music journalist and WFMU radio DJ Jesse Jarnow.
