= The Downs at Santa Fe =

Horse racing facility near Santa Fe, New Mexico

Coordinates: 35°35′19.8″N 106°4′28.1″W

The Downs at Santa Fe was a horse racing facility near Santa Fe, New Mexico, running thoroughbred and American quarter horse events. Originally named Santa Fe Downs, the $5.5 million mile oval track opened in June 1971 with a crowd of 11,000 people, causing traffic jams in the area. Although the track enjoyed good attendance and handle, the heavy debt load to build the track became unmanageable when interest rates rose in the mid-1970s and the track filed for bankruptcy in December 1975.

The track reopened only a year later under the name Downs at Santa Fe when a group led by local businessman Ken Newton acquired the track. Operations resumed with good result. Between 1976 and 1984, The Downs' average daily handle went from $209,827 to $458,031 - the largest percentage increase of any track in the nation during that time. Among the famous horses that raced there was Real Quiet, a horse that won the first two legs of American Triple Crown. Notable jockeys Garrett K. Gomez and Mike Smith won their first races at the Downs. In 1996, Pojoaque Pueblo acquired and renovated the Downs at Santa Fe Racetrack for $7 million, but closed it only one year later after heavy losses.

In 2025, demolition began on the facility. As of June 2025, the property's demolition timeline and future use were unknown.
