= Matthew Brannon =

American artist

Matthew Brannon (born 1971) is an artist who is based in New York City. He was born in St. Maries, Idaho.

Brannon studied at the University of California, Los Angeles and graduated with a BA in 1995. He received his MFA in 1999 from Columbia University in New York. His work has been exhibited at galleries and museums including Kunsthalle Düsseldorf and the Badischer Kunstverein in Germany, the Musée d'Art Moderne de la Ville de Paris, PS1 Contemporary Art Center in New York, the Royal Academy in London, and MAK in Vienna.

Sarah Valdez, writing in Art in America said of his work, "Brannon avoids not only painting, but coherence..."

Brannon's 2011 exhibition at Portikus, Frankfurt am Main, Germany was titled A Question Answered with a Quote.
