= Frost Amphitheater =

Amphitheater at Stanford University, California, US

Coordinates: 37°25′50″N 122°9′57″W

The Laurence Frost Amphitheater, commonly known as Frost Amphitheater, is a prominent amphitheater at Stanford University. It first opened in 1937 and was the site of commencement ceremonies for the university from 1938 until 1984. It can hold about 8,000 people.

== History ==
The amphitheater built in 1937 was a gift of Mr. and Mrs. Howard Frost in memory of their son, John Laurence Frost, who graduated in 1935 and died of polio in the same year. It is a tree lined, grassy, tiered 20-acre (81,000 m^{2}) bowl designed by landscape architect Leslie Kiler.

Throughout the years, the amphitheater has been the host to many events including a prominent speech by Soviet President Mikhail Gorbachev in 1992.

== Music venue ==
The Grateful Dead played 14 shows at the Amphitheater in 1982, 1983, 1985, 1986, 1987, 1988, and 1989. Since 2012, the Stanford Concert Network, a student organization, has hosted the annual Frost Music and Arts Festival at the Amphitheater each May, which has featured headliners Modest Mouse, MGMT, Dispatch, Flume, and Fetty Wap, as well as Eyes Lips Eyes, Benjamin Francis Leftwich, Delorean, Kuroma, Paper Void, Yeasayer, Kaytranada, AlunaGeorge, and Sage the Gemini.

Frost Arts & Music Festival Performers
Year	Headliner	Opening act
2012	Modest Mouse	Benjamin Francis Leftwich
2013	MGMT	Delorean, Kuroma
2014	Dispatch (band)	Yeasayer
2015	Flume	Kaytranada, AlunaGeorge
2016	Fetty Wap	Sage the Gemini
2017	Zedd	Broods
2018	Glass Animals	Ravyn Lenae, Monte Booker
2019	Kali Uchis, Jorja Smith	Mia Carucci

The amphitheater usually hosts a concert (either jazz or classical) and fireworks on July 3.
