= Barton Hall =

Field house in Ithaca, New York, U.S.

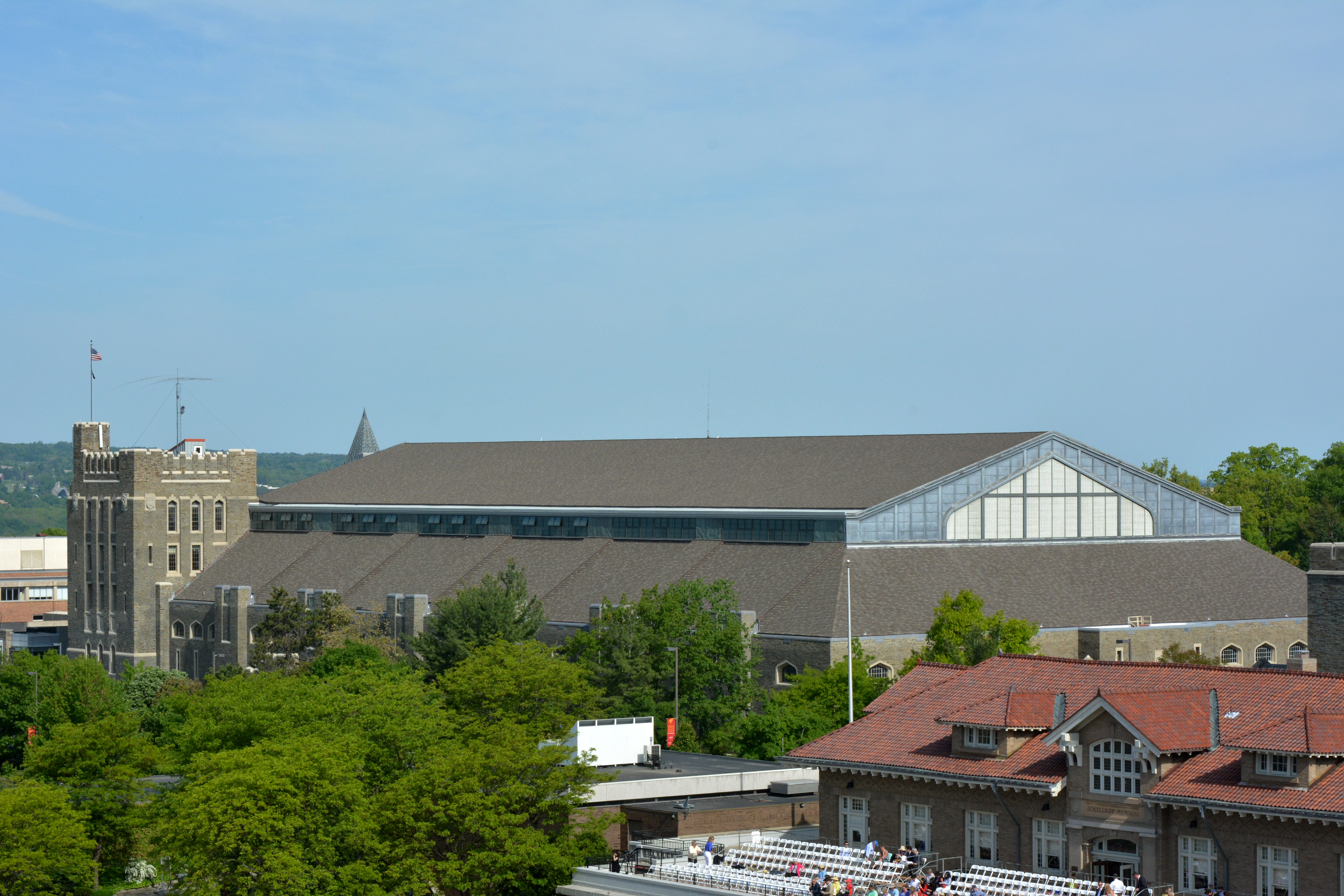
- View of Barton Hall from Schoellkopf Field
- Interactive map of Barton Hall
- Former names: New York State Armory and Drill Hall (to 1940)
- Location: Cornell University; Ithaca, NY 14853
- Coordinates: 42.4460°N 76.4808°W
- Owner: Cornell University
- Operator: Cornell University
- Capacity: 4,800
- Surface: Recaflex track surface

Construction
- Groundbreaking: 1914
- Opened: 1915
- Architect: Lewis F. Pilcher

Tenants
- Cornell University Big Red (indoor track & field), Cornell ROTC, Cornell Police

Barton Hall is an on-campus field house on the campus of Cornell University in Ithaca, New York. It is the site of the school's indoor track facilities, ROTC offices and classes, and Cornell Police. For a long time, Barton Hall was the largest unpillared room in existence. The interior of the building covers almost 2 acres (8,100 m^{2}), and includes a 1/8 mile (200m) indoor track.

== Building ==
The New York State Drill Hall was designed by the official State Architect of New York, Lewis Pilcher. It was built to provide military instruction to Cornell students, as required by Cornell's status as a land-grant institution. Its drill shed originally contained 362 x 228 feet of open floor space, large enough to accommodate 1,000 men. The building is made of local limestone with double trusses spaced 40 feet apart to support the roof. The Architectural Record called the "splendid drill hall" a "notably modern achievement in American architecture."

== History ==
It was built in 1914 and 1915 and was originally designed as a drill hall for the Department of Military Science. Upon its completion it was often referred to as the "New Armory", as opposed to the Old Armory, a building on the now Engineering Quadrangle that has since been demolished and replaced by Hollister Hall. In January 1940, it was named for Col. Frank A. Barton, Class of 1891. Colonel Barton was one of the first two Cornell students to receive an army commission in Cornell's Military Science Program, and was the first ROTC commandant at Cornell from 1904 to 1908. During World War I, Barton Hall functioned as an airplane hangar and it served the ROTC as an armory during World War II.

Barton Hall was well known to all Cornellians. In the days prior to online course registration, each student would come to Barton Hall at the start of the semester to register for classes. This process would involve placing punched cards into bins for each class positioned on tables throughout the hall. Student organizations would also recruit members at these events. In the first part of the 20th century, "drill" was mandatory for all male students, and it would be conducted in Barton Hall. Also, until 1974, graduation was conducted in Barton Hall, until it was moved outdoors to Schoellkopf Field. For many years, it also hosted graduation ceremonies for Ithaca High School.

Barton Hall was home to Cornell Basketball between 1919 and 1990 when the new field house, later named Bartels Hall, was completed. In 1995, Barton received another major change with the construction of the H. Hunt Bradley Track Center under the south bleachers. The center includes a Hall of Fame/meeting room/study facility for track, an office, a library and a 1,500-square-foot (140 m^{2}) weight room.

For many decades, a small room in Barton served as the home of the Cornell Big Red Marching Band and the Cornell Big Red Pep Band. The cramped space was lacking in ventilation and instrument storage space, and the bands were relocated to the purpose-built Fischell Band Center in 2013.

=== Occupations and protests ===
In the Spring of 1969 members of the Afro-American Society (AAS) occupied Willard Straight Hall, the Cornell Student Union, in protest against judicial sanctions against several black students and to demand a black studies program. Two days after the students left Willard Straight Hall, a Students for a Democratic Society (SDS) meeting became a "student takeover of Barton Hall" and the Barton Hall Community was formed.

On May 11, 1972, Barton Hall was again the site of anti-war protests, and one protester threw a rock through a window. The rock thrower was mistakenly identified as physics major James R. Bean, who was later suspended and placed on trial for first degree riot, a class E felony. Bean was acquitted after a four-day trial. Before the end of the trial, the District Attorney subpoenaed the defense witnesses to appear before the grand jury to further investigate the protest. The Bean trial was a high point in political tensions between the town and the campus and marked an end to efforts to prosecute anti-war protesters off-campus.

=== ROTC training ===
For many years, Barton Hall had a non-operational deck gun used in Navy ROTC Training which was fenced off from the general public. On May 1, 1969, as a protest against the Vietnam War, members of the Students for a Democratic Society broke into the fenced area and painted anti-war slogans on the gun. In a departure from the practice of handling student disciplinary issues with the campus judicial system, eight (later expanded to ten) protesters were prosecuted in the city courts for trespassing, but charges against them were dropped. In September 1969, the week-long trial attracted great publicity because the defense called as witnesses a large number of administrators, trustees, President Dale Corson, and former President James A. Perkins to testify.

=== Concerts ===
Barton Hall also serves as a concert venue for the Cornell Campus, with concerts produced by the Cornell Concert Commission. It has hosted acts such as the Grateful Dead, Santana, Ludacris, Bob Dylan, Death Cab For Cutie, Franz Ferdinand, the Cribs, Saint Motel, Daya, and the Flaming Lips.

The Grateful Dead's concert at Barton Hall on May 8, 1977 is considered by some to be the greatest of their career. In 2011, a recording of the concert was one of 25 recordings selected that year for preservation in the National Recording Registry at the Library of Congress. The concert is available in full on the band's 2017 live album Cornell 5/8/77.

=== Renovation ===
In 2009–2011, Barton Hall underwent an $8 million renovation, including structural repairs, work on the gutters and masonry, and replacement of the roof and windows.

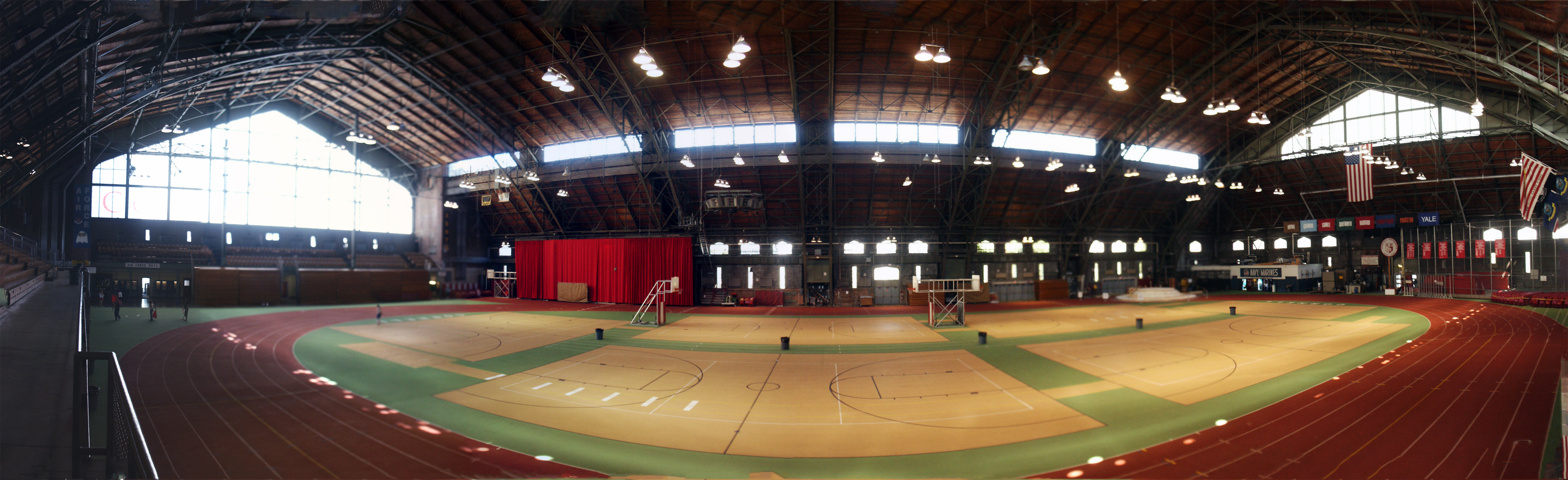
Barton Hall interior in 2006

== Current uses ==
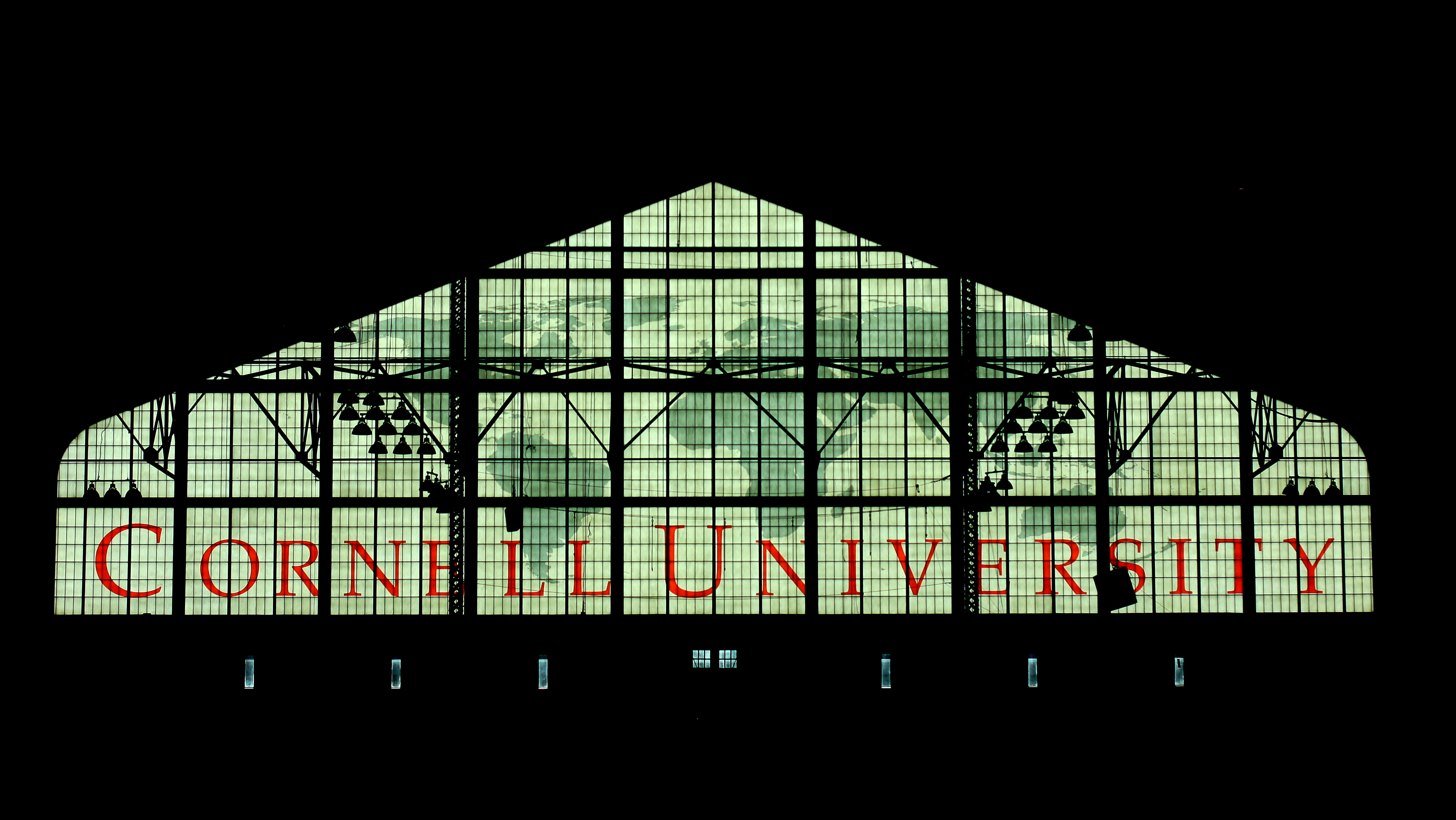
Interior windows of Barton Hall

Barton Hall now contains a 200 m track, basketball courts, the Hart Memorial Library, and the Wortham Museum. After the opening of Newman Arena, the building was remodeled into a premier indoor track facility. The Recaflex track features eight 42-inch lanes, one of the few indoor 200-meter tracks in the country with eight such lanes. Barton also contains a throwing cage with a cement circle and crusher dust landing sector surrounded by a 25-foot (7.6 m) high chain link fence. The interior of the track has a Recaflex runway for the pole vault, two long and triple jump pits and multiple high jump areas. The track itself has a raised aluminum curb and a common finish line.

Barton Hall is also home to the three ROTC Detachments on campus: Army, Navy, and Air Force. Each branch has a dedicated corner of the building where classes are held in their respective fields. Lead labs and drill labs also occur in Barton Hall whether on the track floor or within the detachment buildings themselves.

Barton Hall also contains an indoor challenge course, that has similar elements to those found outside at the Hoffman Challenge Course owned and operated by Cornell Team & Leadership Center.
