= Jesse Jarnow =

Jesse Jarnow is an American music journalist and radio DJ for WFMU.

He is the son of artist Al Jarnow.

== Books ==
- Wasn't That a Time: The Weavers, the Blacklist, and the Battle for the American Soul (Da Capo Press, 2018)
- Heads: A Biography of Psychedelic America (Da Capo Press, 2016)
- Big Day Coming: Yo La Tengo and the Rise of Indie Rock (Gotham Books, 2012)
