= Betty Cantor-Jackson =

- Born: September 18, 1948 (age 78)
- Genre: Rock
- Occupation: Audio engineer
- Years active: 1968–1984; 2011–present

Betty Cantor-Jackson (born September 18, 1948) is an American audio engineer and producer. She is best known for her work recording live concerts for the Grateful Dead from the late 1960s to the early 1980s, including the band's highly-lauded May 8, 1977 concert at Cornell University. She is noted for her ear for recording and her long tenure with the band.

== Early life ==
Growing up in Martinez, California, Cantor-Jackson developed an interest in electronics, saying "I used to take things like radios, other little electronic devices if they didn't work, open them up, mess with them, put them back together and they worked." She started booking shows for her high school, which led her to promote and help with shows across the bay in San Francisco. Through this, she met people in the underground music scene who taught her how to do sound engineering. Her involvement in the music scene and interest in LSD led her to meet and subsequently start working with the Grateful Dead.

== Grateful Dead era ==
In 1968, she landed an apprenticeship recording live sound with Bob Matthews at San Francisco venue the Carousel, which would later become the Fillmore West. The same year, they worked together on the Grateful Dead's second studio album, Anthem of the Sun. After this, the two regularly mixed and taped the band's live recordings and became known as "Bob and Betty." The duo also co-produced the band's fourth studio album, Workingman's Dead (1970). A few years later, Cantor married tour manager Rex Jackson, and they continued to record the Dead's live shows with their own tapes and equipment. After Jackson's death in a car crash in 1976, she was put on the band's payroll in 1977 and 1978 to record and help stage setup.

Later, she began dating the Grateful Dead's new keyboardist, Brent Mydland. She did not feel welcome working with the band after the two broke up, saying, "Brent and I split up after a few years, with the last year spent in the studio working on his solo project. This put me in the category of the dreaded 'ex.' I didn't think that could apply to me, but he was a band member. Everyone was paranoid of me being around, so I no longer had access to my studio or the vault." Her last work for the Grateful Dead during this period was the 1981 live album Dead Set.

== The "Betty Boards" ==
Since Cantor-Jackson often used her own tapes and equipment when recording shows, they were in her possession unless bought by the Grateful Dead for their own releases. In the mid-80s, she was forced to foreclose on her home and moved to Oregon with her in-laws to be a nursing assistant. After struggling to pay storage fees for her belongings in California, her storage spaces were auctioned in 1986. These included more than 1000 tapes from her career as a live audio engineer, which became known as the "Betty Boards." They were mostly recordings of the Grateful Dead, but included bands such as Legion of Mary, Kingfish, the Jerry Garcia Band, Old & In the Way, and the New Riders of the Purple Sage.

The Grateful Dead declined to bid, leading to the storage lots being auctioned to the public. Three separate parties ended up in possession of the tapes; none of them were Grateful Dead fans. One party kept them in a storage locker. The second party, an unnamed couple, got a friend to record the tapes to cassette from reel-to-reel in order to distribute them. The last, a high school teacher, kept them in a barn for years, where they decayed, before agreeing to a request by Rob Eaton, guitarist for the Grateful Dead tribute band Dark Star Orchestra, to allow them to be restored. More than 200 tapes were restored and digitally archived, amounting to nearly 100 hours of music. The Grateful Dead offered the owner $100,000 for the tapes, but he refused to sell them for anything less than $1 million. Eaton went on to contact other owners to restore their tapes as well, reaching agreements with one of the other primary owners in 2014.

Several of these tapes have since been commercially released. The most notable of these is Cornell 5/8/77, a concert at Cornell University's Barton Hall. It is widely regarded as one of the Grateful Dead's best shows and one of the best live recordings of the band. In 2012 it was added to the National Recording Registry of the Library of Congress for being "culturally, historically, or aesthetically important, and/or inform or reflect life in the United States."

== Post-Grateful Dead career ==
Cantor-Jackson quit taping shows until 2011, when she was asked to stage manage for Wavy Gravy's 70th birthday party and benefit concert. Playing the show was former Black Crowes' frontman Chris Robinson's new band, Chris Robinson Brotherhood. Cantor-Jackson loved the group and insisted on taping their future shows. These recordings turned into a series of live albums called Betty's Blends. She also mixed and mastered for the Americana band Midnight North in 2015.

As of August 2019, she is the engineer and production and road manager for the band and for the choir of Glide Memorial Church. She still talks to some of the Grateful Dead's band members and crew and went to a show in Santa Clara during their highly publicized 50th anniversary tour.
