= Historic Hotels of America =

National Trust for Historic Preservation program

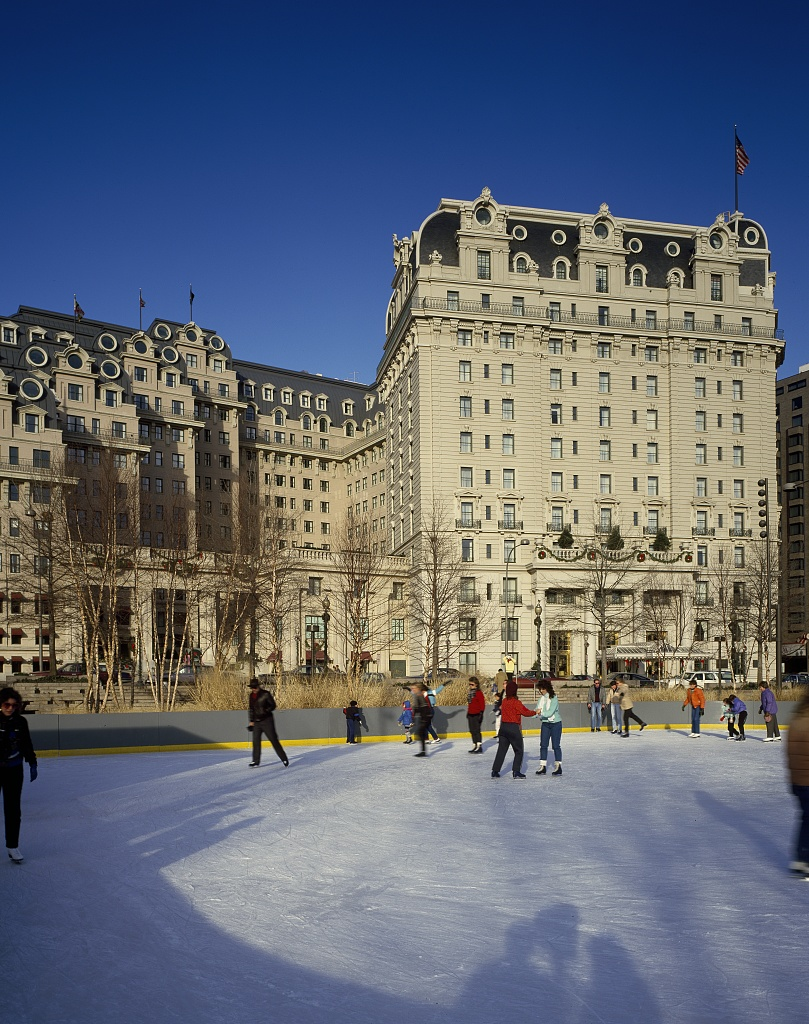
Willard Hotel in Washington, D.C.

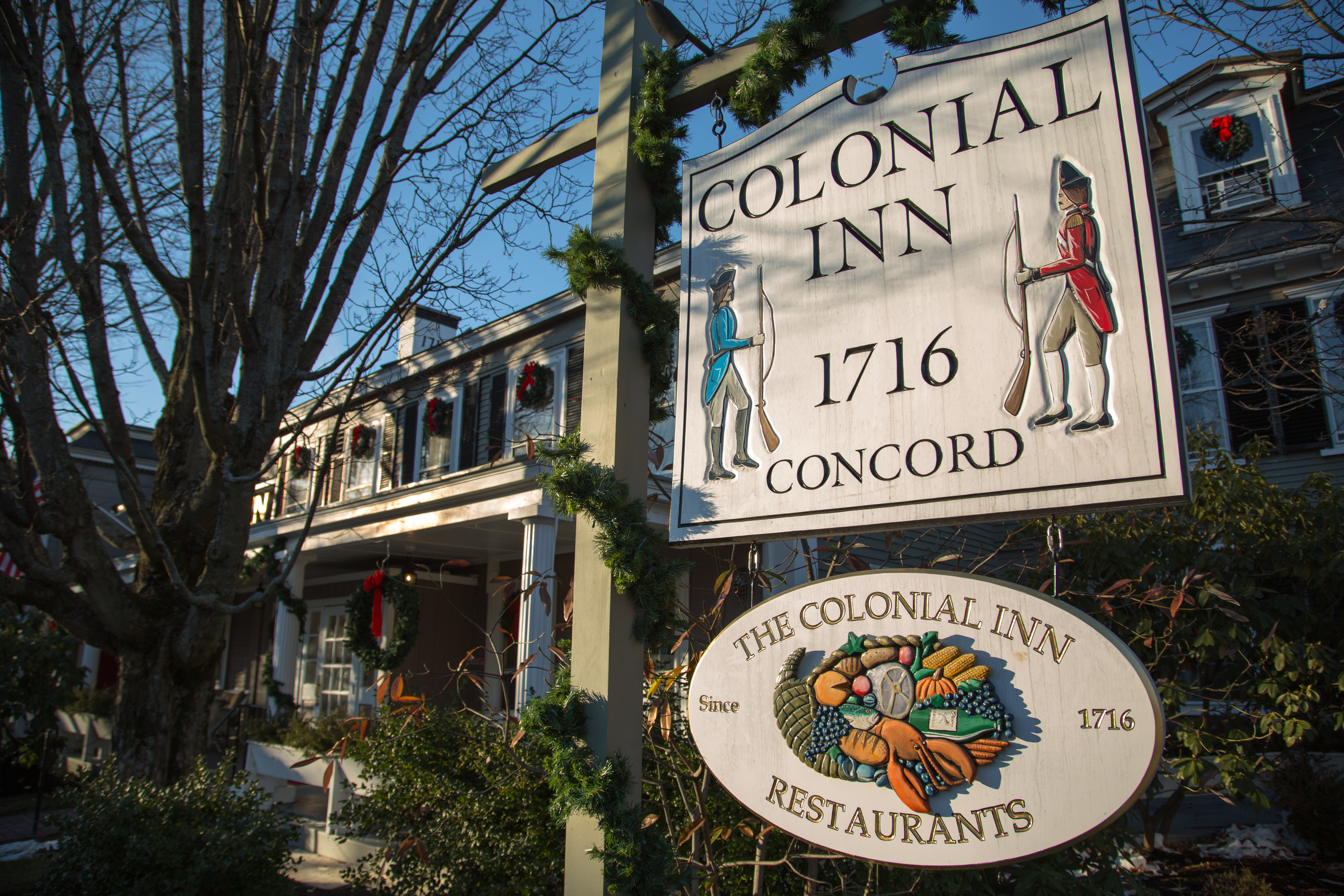
Concord's Colonial Inn in Concord, Massachusetts

Historic Hotels of America is a program of the National Trust for Historic Preservation that was founded in 1989 with 32 charter members; the program identifies hotels in the United States that have maintained authenticity, sense of place, and architectural integrity from their respective time periods.

As of 2025, the program includes 288 hotels in 44 of the 50 states, as well as Puerto Rico, the U.S. Virgin Islands, and Washington, D.C..

== Membership ==
To be included in the program, a hotel must be at least 50 years old, designated by the U.S. secretary of the interior as a National Historic Landmark or listed on or eligible for listing on the National Register of Historic Places; and recognized as having historic significance.

The program generates funds for the National Trust through commissions on bookings done through their website.

Active and former members of the HHA program, by state, include:

== Alabama ==
- Battle House Hotel (1852), Mobile
- Grand Hotel Golf Resort & Spa (1847), Point Clear

Former members:

- Redmont Hotel (1925), Birmingham
- The Admiral Hotel (1940), Mobile

== Alaska ==
- Hotel Captain Cook (1965), Anchorage

== Arizona ==
- Bright Angel Lodge & Cabins (1890), Grand Canyon Village
- El Tovar Hotel (1905), Grand Canyon Village
- Phantom Ranch (1922), Grand Canyon Village
- The Wigwam (1929), Litchfield Park
- Castle Hot Springs (1896), Morristown
- The Hermosa Inn (1935), Paradise Valley
- Hotel San Carlos (1928), Phoenix
- Royal Palms Resort and Spa (1948), Phoenix
- Hassayampa Inn (1927), Prescott
- Tubac Golf Resort and Spa (1789), Tubac
- Hacienda Del Sol Guest Ranch Resort (1929), Tucson
- White Stallion Ranch (1900), Tucson

Former members:

- Hotel Valley Ho (1956), Scottsdale
- The Hotel Congress (1919), Tucson

== Arkansas ==
- 1886 Crescent Hotel & Spa (1886), Eureka Springs
- Capital Hotel (1873), Little Rock

== California ==
- Claremont Club & Spa (1915), Berkeley
- La Casa Del Zorro Desert Resort & Spa (1937), Borrego Springs
- Omni La Costa Resort & Spa (1965), Carlsbad
- The Inn at Death Valley (1926), Furnace Creek
- Benbow Inn (1926), Garberville
- La Valencia Hotel (1926), La Jolla
- Surf & Sand Resort (1948), Laguna Beach
- Fairmont Breakers (1926), Long Beach
- The Queen Mary (1936), Long Beach
- Fairmont Century Plaza (1961), Los Angeles
- The Biltmore Los Angeles (1923), Los Angeles
- The Hollywood Roosevelt (1927), Los Angeles
- Napa River Inn (1884), Napa
- Ojai Valley Inn (1923), Ojai
- The Mission Inn Hotel & Spa (1876), Riverside
- Hotel del Coronado (1888), San Diego
- Rancho Bernardo Inn (1963), San Diego
- Sofia Hotel (1926), San Diego
- The Lafayette Hotel and Club (1946), San Diego
- Casa Madrona Hotel and Spa (1885), San Francisco
- Cavallo Point (1901), San Francisco
- Fairmont Heritage Place, Ghirardelli Square (1893), San Francisco
- Fairmont San Francisco (1907), San Francisco
- Inn at the Presidio (1903), San Francisco
- InterContinental Mark Hopkins Hotel (1926), San Francisco
- Omni San Francisco (1926), San Francisco
- Palace Hotel (1875), San Francisco
- The Lodge at the Presidio (1894), San Francisco
- Hayes Mansion (1905), San Jose
- Fairmont Miramar Hotel & Bungalows (1921), Santa Monica
- Hotel Casa Del Mar (1926), Santa Monica
- The Alisal Guest Ranch and Resort (1946), Solvang
- Fairmont Sonoma Mission Inn & Spa (1927), Sonoma
- Stonepine Estate (1920), Carmel Valley
- Cavallo Point (1903), Marin County
- Fairmont Sonoma Mission Inn & Spa (1927), Sonoma
- Hotel La Rose (1907), Santa Rosa

Former members:

- Berkeley City Club (1929), Berkeley
- Hotel Constance Pasadena (1926), Pasadena
- Hotel Whitcomb (1916), San Francisco
- The Huntington Hotel (1924), San Francisco
- Hotel La Rose (1907), Santa Rosa

== Colorado ==
- Hotel Boulderado (1909), Boulder
- The Broadmoor (1918), Colorado Springs
- The Brown Palace Hotel and Spa, Autograph Collection (1892), Denver
- Strater Hotel (1887), Durango
- Hotel Colorado (1893), Glenwood Springs
- The Cliff House at Pikes Peak (1873), Manitou Springs

Former members:

- The Stanley Hotel (1909), Estes Park

== Connecticut ==
- Water's Edge Resort and Spa (1920), Westbrook
- 1754 House (1754), Woodbury

Former members:

- The Spa at Norwich Inn (1929), Norwich

== Delaware ==
- The Inn at Montchanin Village (1799), Montchanin
- HOTEL DU PONT (1903), Wilmington

== Florida ==
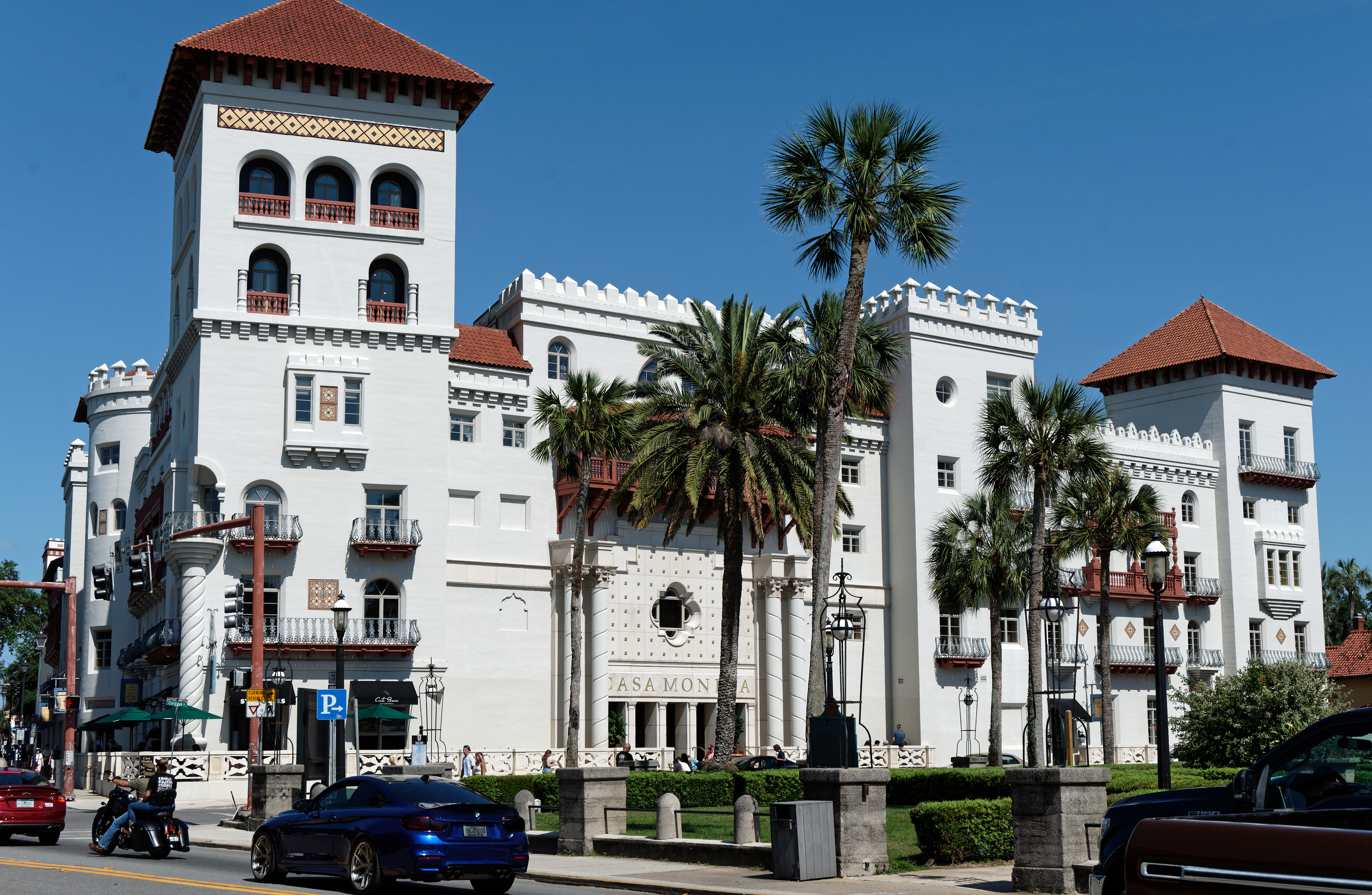
Casa Monica

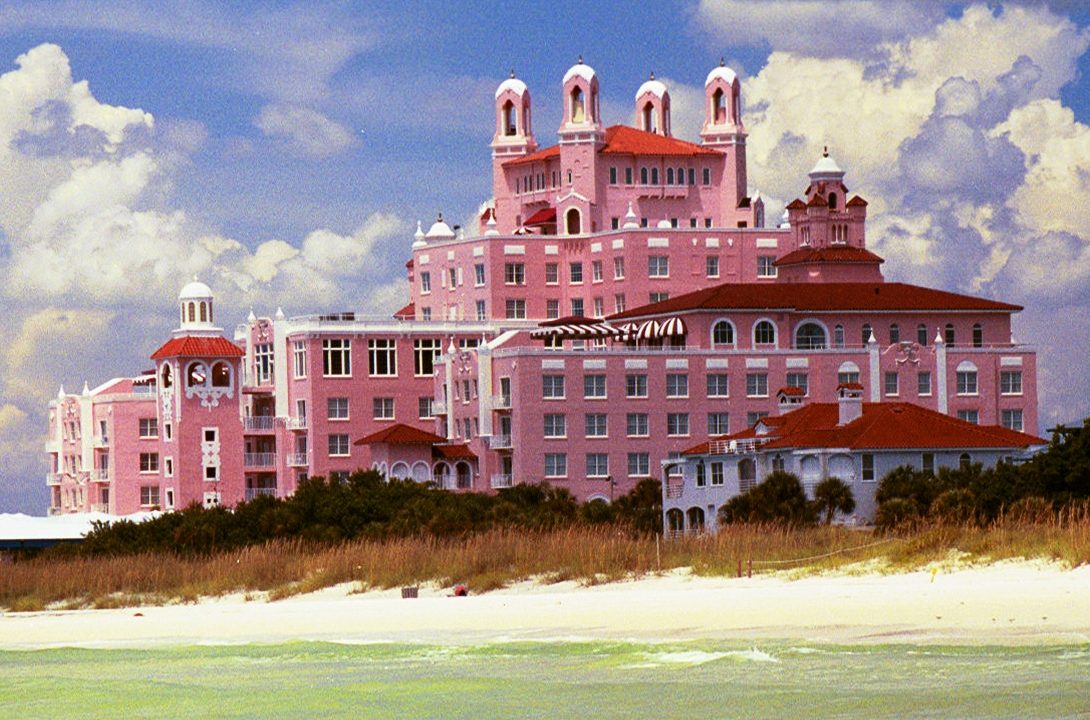
The Don CeSar

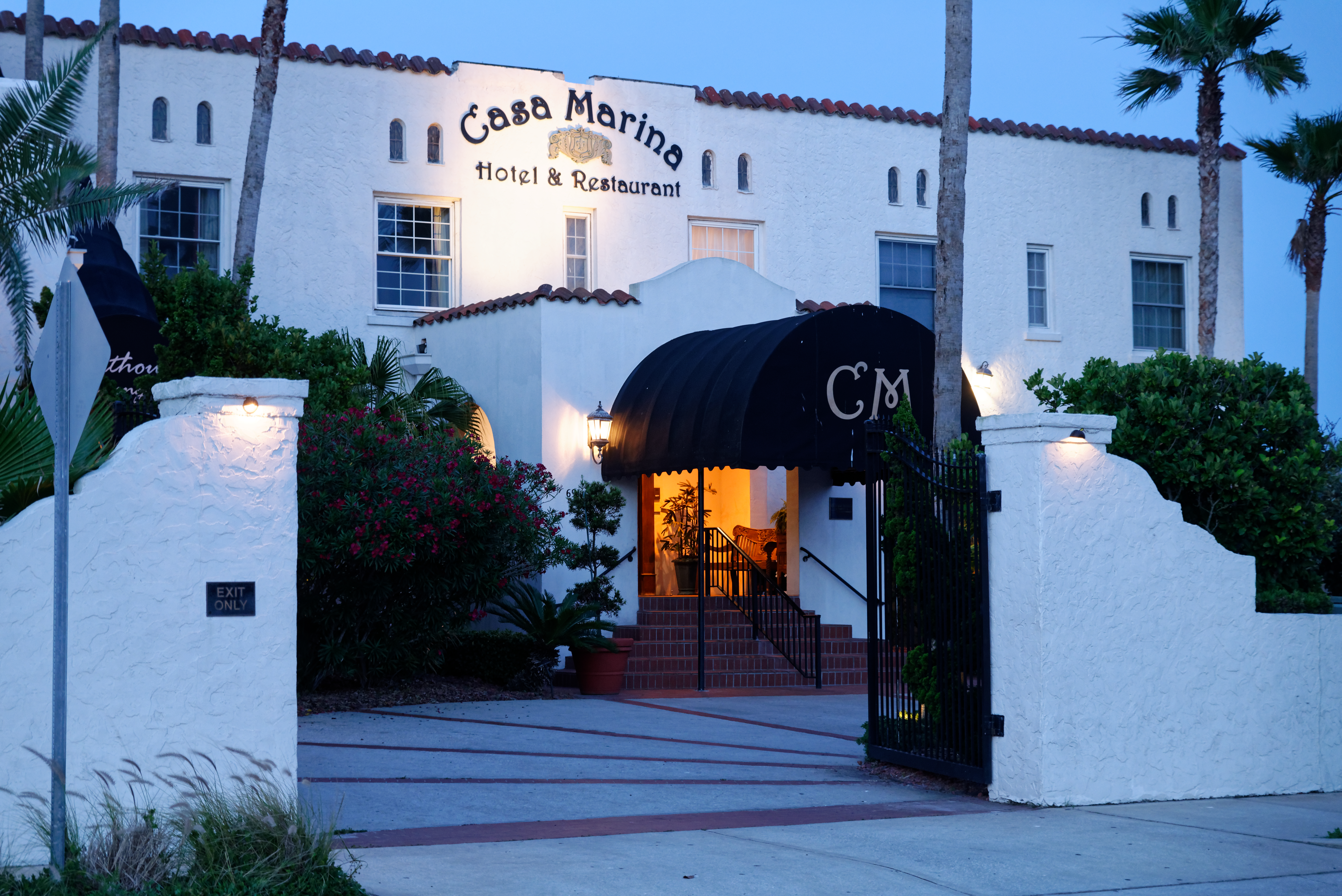
Casa Marina Hotel

- Belleview Inn (1897), Belleair
- The Gasparilla Inn & Club (1913), Boca Grande
- Colony Hotel & Cabana Club (1926), Delray Beach
- Mission Resort + Club (1964), Howey-in-the-hills
- Casa Marina Hotel and Restaurant (1925), Jacksonville Beach
- La Concha Hotel & Spa (1926), Key West
- Casa Faena (1928), Miami Beach
- Hotel Trouvail (1940), Miami Beach
- The Balfour Hotel (1940), Miami Beach
- The National Hotel (1940), Miami Beach
- The Savoy Hotel & Beach Club (1935), Miami Beach
- Casa Monica Resort & Spa (1888), St. Augustine
- The Don CeSar (1928), St. Pete Beach
- The Vinoy Resort & Golf Club, Autograph Collection (1925), St. Petersburg
- The Lodge at Wakulla Springs (1937), Crawfordville

Former members:

- The Terrace Hotel (1924), Lakeland
- Greystone Miami Beach (1939), Miami Beach

== Georgia ==
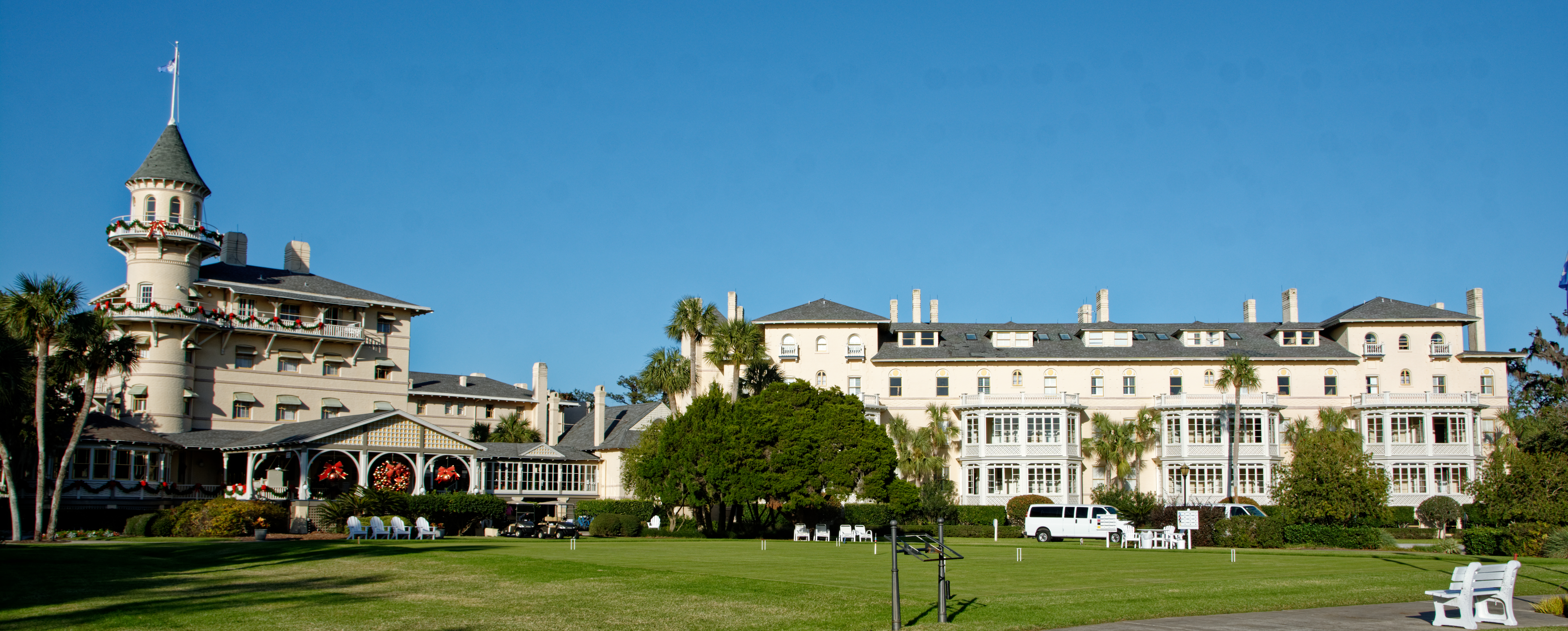
Jekyll Island Club

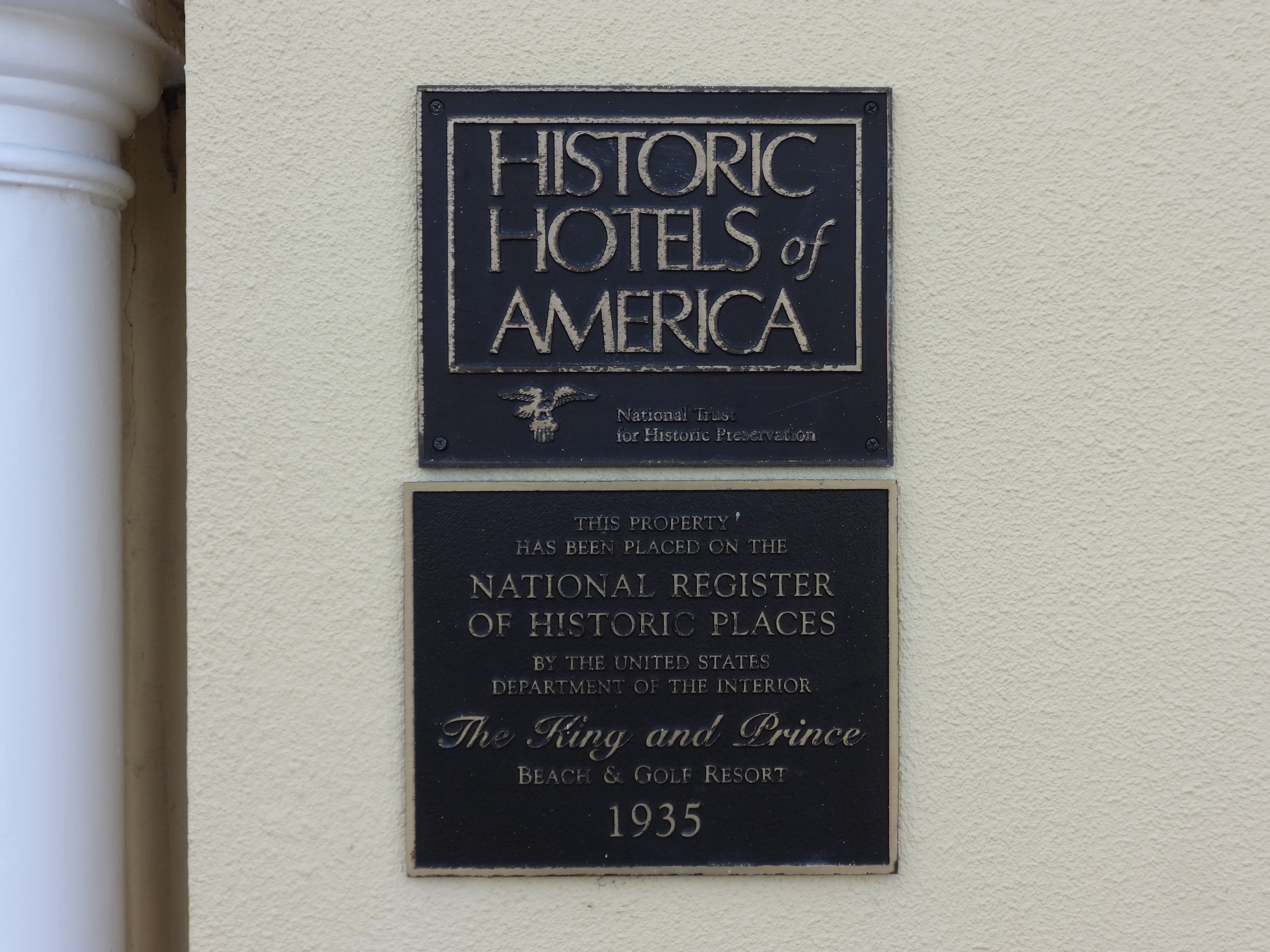
Historic Hotels of America plaque at the King and Prince

- Ellis Hotel, Tribute Portfolio (1913), Atlanta
- Hotel Indigo Atlanta Midtown (1925), Atlanta
- Georgian Terrace Hotel (1911), Atlanta
- Greyfield Inn (1900), Cumberland Island
- Jekyll Island Club Resort (1887), Jekyll Island
- Bellwether House (1876), Savannah
- JW Marriott Savannah Plant Riverside District (1912), Savannah
- River Street Inn (1817), Savannah
- The DeSoto (1834), Savannah
- The King and Prince Beach and Golf Resort (1935), St. Simons Island

Former members:

- The Candler Hotel Atlanta, Curio Collection by Hilton (1904), Atlanta
- Partridge Inn (1910), Augusta

== Hawaii ==
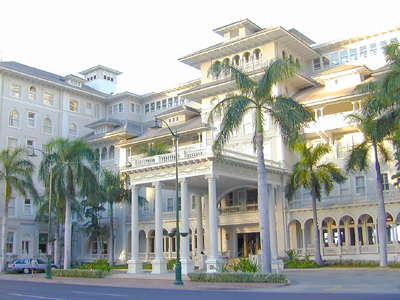
Moana Surfrider

- Hilton Hawaiian Village Waikiki Beach Resort (1957), Honolulu
- Moana Surfrider, A Westin Resort & Spa (1901), Honolulu
- The Royal Hawaiian, A Luxury Collection Resort (1927), Honolulu
- Mauna Kea Beach Hotel (1964), Kohala Coast

Former members:

- Grand Naniloa Hotel (1939), Hilo
- Pioneer Inn (1901), Maui

== Illinois ==
- 21c Museum Hotel Chicago by MGallery (1927), Chicago
- The Silversmith Hotel (1897), Chicago
- Hilton Chicago (1927), Chicago
- InterContinental Chicago Magnificent Mile (1929), Chicago
- Palmer House, A Hilton Hotel (1871), Chicago
- Union League Club of Chicago (1886), Chicago

Former members:

- The Drake Hotel (1920), Chicago
- LondonHouse Chicago (1922), Chicago

== Indiana ==
- French Lick Springs Hotel (1901), French Lick, at Pluto Mineral Springs. Beaux Arts.
- Omni Severin Hotel, Indianapolis (1913), Beaux Arts.
- Morris Inn at Notre Dame (1952), Notre Dame. Gothic Revival.
- West Baden Springs Hotel (1901), West Baden Springs. "is the crown jewel of French Lick Resort's $500 million restoration." It is a National Historic Landmark.

Former members:

- The Sherman, (1852), Batesville. "in the heart of historic downtown Batesville, a convenient midway meeting point between Indianapolis and Cincinnati, The Sherman is a well-loved locale for the people of the town and an important Indiana landmark." Tudor Style.

== Kentucky ==
- Boone Tavern Hotel of Berea College (1909), Berea
- 21c Museum Hotel Lexington by MGallery (1914), Lexington, Beaux Arts
- 21c Museum Hotel Louisville by MGallery (1800s), Louisville. Incorporates Falls City Tobacco Bank
- The Brown Hotel (1923), Louisville

Former members:

- The Campbell House Curio, A Collection by Hilton (1951), Lexington
- The Sire Hotel Lexington, Tapestry Collection by Hilton (1916), Lexington. The Sire Hotel Lexington "on site of the former Gratz Park Inn, which is part of Lexington's beautiful Gratz Park Historic District. The location was originally the home of a family medical practice called the Lexington Clinic."
- The Seelbach Hilton Louisville (1905), Louisville, in Beaux Arts style

== Louisiana ==
- Hilton Baton Rouge Capitol Center (1927), Baton Rouge
- Southern Hotel (1907), Covington, Louisiana, included in the Division of St. John Historic District
- Bienville House (1835), New Orleans, converted into a hotel in 1967
- Hilton New Orleans/St. Charles Avenue (1926), New Orleans
- Hotel Monteleone (1886), New Orleans
- Le Pavillon Hotel (1907), New Orleans, an early skyscraper
- NOPSI New Orleans (1927), New Orleans, in Chicago School style. It is a Salamander Hotel.
- Omni Royal Orleans (1843), New Orleans, previously known as The City Exchange, as St. Louis Hotel, and as St. Louis Exchange

Former members:

- Nottoway Plantation and Resort (1859), White Castle, whose original mansion is claimed to be the largest surviving antebellum plantation mansion

== Maine ==
- The Colony Hotel (1914), Kennebunkport, also known as "The Colony", included in Cape Arundel Summer Colony Historic District.
- Portland Regency Hotel & Spa (1895), Portland

Former members:

- The Westin Portland Harborview, originally "The Eastland", Portland. Refused to let Eleanor Roosevelt stay there.

== Maryland ==
- Historic Inns of Annapolis (1727), Annapolis. Colonial Revival
- Hotel Brexton (1881), Baltimore. Queen Anne
- Lord Baltimore Hotel (1928), Baltimore. Listed on the National Register of Historic Places. Beaux Arts
- Antrim 1844 (1844), Taneytown. Listed on the National Register of Historic Places

Former members:

- Inn at Perry Cabin (1816), St. Michaels. Designed by Commodore Oliver Hazard Perry’s aide-de-camp, Samuel Hambleton. Greek Revival

== Massachusetts ==
- Inn on Boltwood (1926), Amherst. Colonial – Colonial Revival
- founding: Fairmont Copley Plaza (1912), Boston. Designed by Henry Janeway Hardenbergh. Renaissance Revival
- Hilton Boston Downtown/Faneuil Hall (1928), Boston. Asserted to be "Boston's first Art Deco skyscraper".
- Omni Parker House, Boston (1855), Boston. Classic Revival
- XV Beacon (1903), Boston. Beaux Arts
- Kendall Hotel (1895), Cambridge. In Victorian firehouse asserted to be the oldest building in the Kendall Square area.
- Concord's Colonial Inn (1716), Concord. Federal.
- Crowne Pointe Historic Inn (1900), Provincetown. Victorian
- Hawthorne Hotel (1925), Salem. Colonial Revival
- founding: The Red Lion Inn (1773), Stockbridge. Federal
- Publick House Historic Inn (1771), Sturbridge
- Chatham Bars Inn (1914), Chatham, Massachusetts

Former members:

- Boston Park Plaza, (1927) Boston
- Harbor View Hotel of Martha's Vineyard (1891), Edgartown. Shingle Style.

== Michigan ==
- Amway Grand Plaza, Curio Collection by Hilton (1913), Grand Rapids, originally the Pantlind Hotel
- Grand Hotel (1887), Mackinac Island
- Island House Hotel (1887), Mackinac Island

Former members:

- Landmark Inn (1930), Marquette
- DoubleTree Suites by Hilton Hotel Detroit Downtown - Fort Shelby (1917), Detroit
- The Inn on Ferry Street, Detroit, in East Ferry Avenue Historic District

== Minnesota ==
- St. James Hotel (1875), Red Wing
- The Saint Paul Hotel (1910), Saint Paul

== Missouri ==
- The Raphael Hotel (1928), Kansas City
- St. Louis Union Station Hotel (1894), St. Louis, in Union Station (St. Louis)
- Hotel Indigo St. Louis Downtown (1909), St. Louis

Former members:

- Hilton President Kansas City (1926), Kansas City
- Hotel Phillips Kansas City (1931), Kansas City
- Hilton St. Louis Downtown at the Arch (1888), St. Louis, was the Merchant Laclede National Bank

== Montana ==
- Many Glacier Hotel (1915), Babb
- Lake McDonald Lodge (1914), Glacier National Park
- Andrus Hotel (1917), Dillon. HHA member in 2022, has been member since 2021.

== Nebraska ==
- The Peregrine Omaha Downtown, Curio Collection by Hilton (1912), Omaha, Nebraska

Former members:

- The Redick Tower was formerly an HHA member.

== Nevada ==
- Mizpah Hotel (1907), Tonopah, aka Grand Old Lady

== New Hampshire ==
- founding: Omni Bretton Arms Inn (1896), Bretton Woods. "44-nation Bretton Woods Monetary Conference in 1944." Queen Anne.
- founding: Mount Washington Hotel (1902), Bretton Woods. "was the setting for the historic Bretton Woods Monetary Conference in 1944." Renaissance Revival.
- Hanover Inn Dartmouth (1780?), Hanover. On site of home of General Ebenezer Brewster. Colonial Revival.
- Eagle Mountain House, Jackson. Colonial Revival
- Wentworth by the Sea (1874), New Castle. Second Empire
- Mountain View Grand Resort & Spa, Whitefield

Former members:

- The Bedford Village Inn, Bedford. Colonial Revival

== New Mexico ==
- Hilton Santa Fe Historic Plaza (1973), Santa Fe
- La Fonda (1922), Santa Fe
- La Posada de Santa Fe (1882), Santa Fe
- Old Santa Fe Inn (1930), Santa Fe

Formerly listed:

- Plaza Hotel 1982 (1882), Las Vegas

== New Jersey ==
- Caribbean Motel (1957), Wildwood Crest. " in the New Jersey beach resort community of The Wildwoods – home to the largest surviving collection of mid-20th century commercial beach resort architecture in North America."

== New York ==
- Bear Mountain Inn, Bear Mountain
- The Otesaga Hotel, Cooperstown. Colonial Revival
- Queensbury Hotel, Glens Falls. Overlooking City Park on Ridge Street. Colonial Revival
- Oheka Castle, Huntington. Renaissance Revival
- Mohonk Mountain House (1869), New Paltz. Victorian
- JW Marriott Essex House, New York. Art Deco
- Omni Berkshire Place, New York City (1926), New York. "Warren & Wetmore built this historic landmark hotel in 1926. The Berkshire Hotel was purchased in May 1978 by the Dunfey Hotels Corporation, which included the Omni Hotels and Dunfey Hotels groups. The property received a $9.5 million face-lift in 1979." Classic Revival.
- Martinique New York on Broadway, Curio Collection by Hilton, New York. "Designed by Henry Hardenbergh, who also designed the Waldorf Astoria, the Plaza Hotel, and the Dakota Apartments on Central Park." Beaux Arts
- The Plaza, New York. Beaux Arts
- The Redbury New York, New York. Renaissance Revival
- The Renwick Hotel New York City, Curio Collection by Hilton, New York. Renaissance Revival
- Beekman Arms and Delamater Inn (1766), Rhinebeck
- Hotel Saranac, Curio Collection by Hilton, Saranac Lake. Colonial Revival
- Marriott Syracuse Downtown (1924), Syracuse. Originally the Hotel Syracuse, reopened in 2016 as Marriott Syracuse Downtown. Renaissance Revival.
- The Sagamore, Bolton Landing
- Blue Moon Hotel, New York, New York (1879), New York.

Former members:

- AKA Sutton Place, New York. Art Deco
- AKA Times Square, New York. Romanesque Revival
- AKA Wall Street, New York. Beaux Arts
- Hotel Skyler Syracuse, Tapestry Collection by Hilton (1921), Syracuse. Occupied by the Temple Adath Yeshurun for more than 50 years, later housed the Salt City Theatre Group. Now asserted to be "the third hotel in the United States and the first in Syracuse to be certified LEED Platinum." Georgian Revival.
- Jefferson Clinton Hotel (1927), Syracuse. Beaux Arts
- Castle Hotel & Spa, Tarrytown. Gothic Revival
- Hotel Utica (1912), Utica. "Opened as Hotel Utica in 1912, it was the premier hotel in Central New York."

== North Carolina ==
- Haywood Park Hotel (1923), Asheville. Located in a former department store building. Classic Revival
- The Omni Grove Park Inn (1913), Asheville. Arts & Crafts, with red clay tile roof and original Roycroft furnishings and fixtures.
- Green Park Inn (1891), Blowing Rock. Queen Anne Victorian style
- The Dunhill Hotel (1929), Charlotte
- 21c Museum Hotel Durham by MGallery (1937), Durham. Art Deco. Also known as Hotel Durham, it is located in the former Durham Bank & Trust Company building.
- Pinehurst Resort (1895), Pinehurst. Includes 3 hotels, in a National Historic Landmark District.
- The Graylyn Estate (1932), Winston-Salem
- The Historic Magnolia House (1889), Greensboro.

Former members:

- Mast Farm Inn (1792), Banner Elk "an award-winning and world renowned historic country inn and restaurant" in the Valle Crucis Historic District, "which has been welcoming guests since the 1800s." Colonial Revival

== Ohio ==
- 21c Museum Hotel Cincinnati (1912), Cincinnati.
- Ariel Broadway Hotel (1925), Lorain.
- Best Western Mariemont Inn (1926), Cincinnati.
- Hilton Cincinnati Netherland Plaza (1931), Cincinnati.

== Oklahoma ==
- Inn at Price Tower (1956), Bartlesville. In the Price Tower designed by Frank Lloyd Wright
- 21c Museum Hotel Oklahoma City by MGallery (1916), Oklahoma City. NRHP-listed, in Albert Kahn-designed Oklahoma City Ford Motor Company Assembly Plant
- The Skirvin Hilton Oklahoma City (1911), Oklahoma City. NRHP-listed as Skirvin Hotel
- The Atherton Hotel at Oklahoma State University (1950), Stillwater. Originally the "Union Club"

Former members:

- Tulsa Club Hotel, Curio Collection by Hilton (1927), Tulsa

== Oregon ==
- Ashland Springs Hotel, Ashland
- Crater Lake Lodge, White City
- Embassy Suites by Hilton Portland Downtown (1912), Portland. Originally the Multnomah Hotel.

Former members:

- The Heathman Hotel (1927), Portland

== Pennsylvania ==
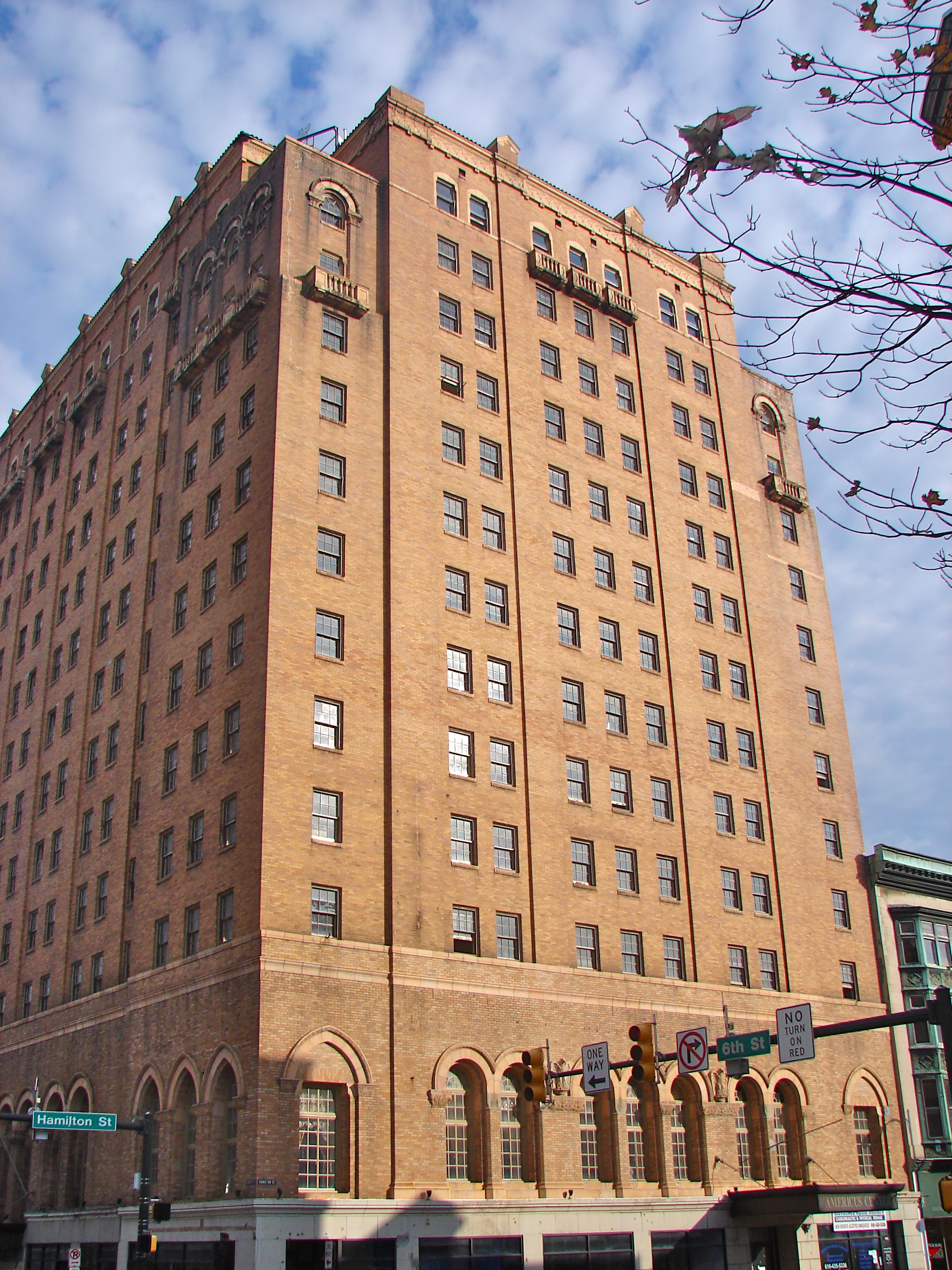
Americus Hotel in Allentown

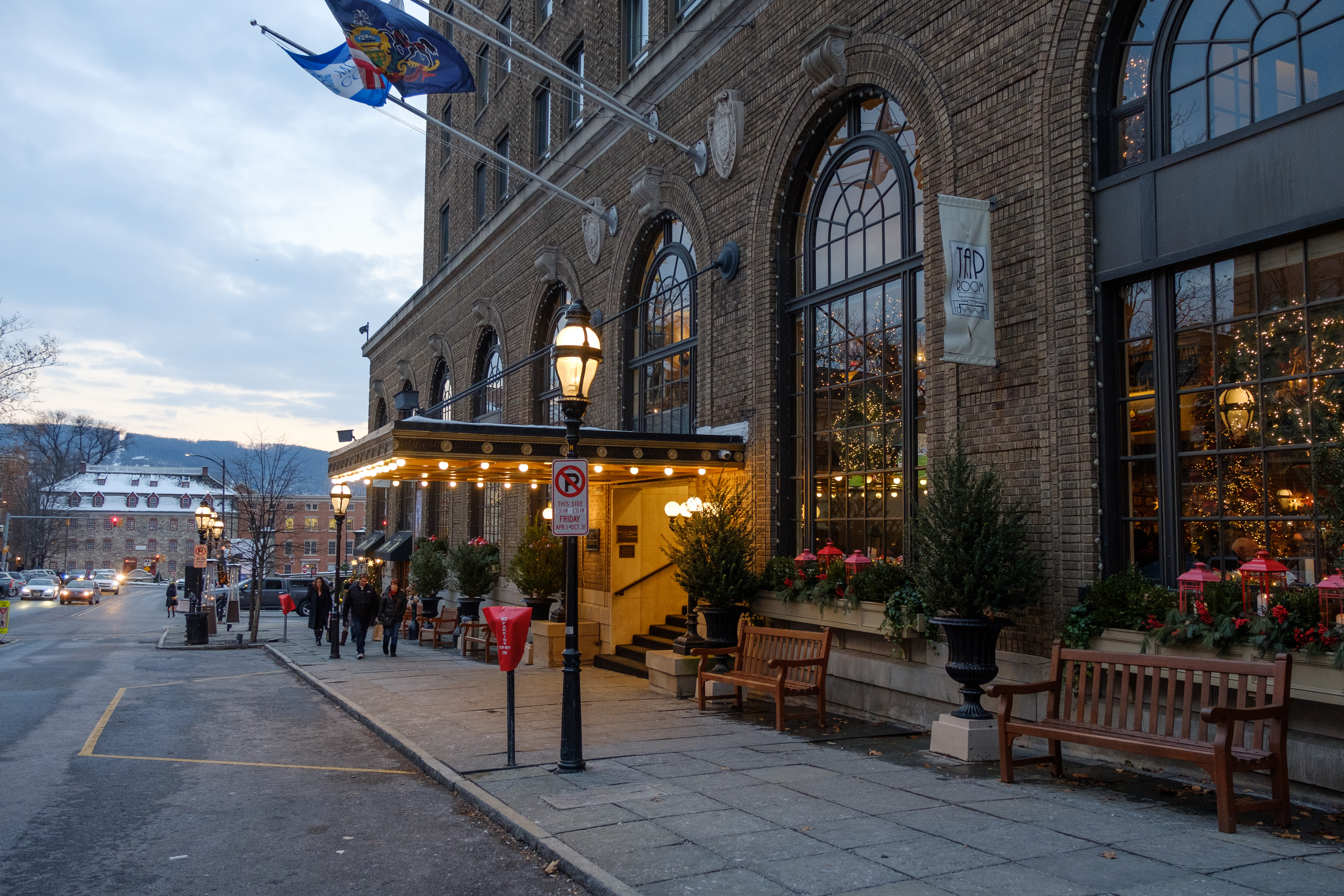
Hotel Bethlehem in Bethlehem

- Omni Bedford Springs Resort (1806), Bedford. Eclectic
- Hotel Bethlehem (1922), Bethlehem. Beaux Arts
- The Sayre Mansion (1858), Bethlehem. Gothic Revival
- The Lodge at Nemacolin Woodlands Resort (1968), Farmington. Located "at the center of the world-famous Nemacolin Woodlands Resort, it was once the peaceful hunting lodge of the Pittsburgh industrial titan, Willard F. Rockwell. Constructed in 1968, its immense popularity among his loved ones inspired Rockwell to turn the building into a vacation spot open to the public." Tudor Revival
- Ledges Hotel (1890), Hawley. Originally the John S. O'Connor Glass Factory. Federal
- Silver Birches (hotel) (1929), Hawley. In 13 historic structures on shoreline of Lake Wallenpaupack. Includes Colonial Revival architecture.
- The Settlers Inn at Bingham Park (1927), Hawley. Has Arts & Crafts furniture. Tudor Revival
- The Hotel Hershey (1933), Hershey. Implemented idiosyncratic vision of Milton S. Hershey. Spanish Colonial Revival
- Cork Factory Hotel (1865), Lancaster. Eclectic
- Lancaster Arts Hotel (1881), Lancaster. Eclectic
- The Inn at Leola Village, Est. 1867 (1867), Leola. In Pennsylvania Dutch Country near Lancaster, Pennsylvania. Includes "five restored agricultural structures including two 19th-century farmhouses and a tobacco barn," three holding guest rooms.
- Omni William Penn Hotel (1916), Pittsburgh. Classic Revival
- Skytop Lodge (1928), Skytop. Colonial Revival
- The Nittany Lion Inn of the Pennsylvania State University (1931), State College. Colonial Revival
- Penn Wells Hotel (1869), Wellsboro. Adjacent to associated Art Deco-style Arcadia Theatre. Victorian.
- Hotel Warner (1930), West Chester, also known as the Warner Theater. NRHP-listed in 1979 as a theater; converted into a hotel in 2012.
- Eagles Mere Inn (1887), Eagles Mere became an HHA member in 2021. It is a contributing building in the NRHP-listed Eagles Mere Historic District,
- Glasbern (1870), Fogelsville.
- Morris House Hotel (1787), Philadelphia.
- Historic Americus Hotel (1926), Allentown.

Former members:

- Gettysburg Hotel, Est.1797 (1797), Gettysburg. Beaux Arts
- AKA Rittenhouse Square (1912), Philadelphia. Beaux Arts
- The Bellevue Hotel (1904), Philadelphia. Renovated in 2016. Renaissance Revival.
- Distrikt Hotel Pittsburgh, Curio Collection by Hilton (1924), Pittsburgh. Listed on the National Register of Historic Places. Originally served as the headquarters for the Salvation Army’s Western Pennsylvania Division.

== Rhode Island ==
- Newport Beach Hotel & Suites (1940), Middletown, "formerly known as the Inn at Newport Beach." A massive hurricane in 1938 wiped out the town's numerous beach establishments. Two years later, after the sand settled, the Toppa family decided to build a new inn on the beach, positioning the property 100 feet from the rocks and the ocean's crashing waves." Colonial Revival
- The Hotel Viking (1926), Newport, "the most recent multi-million dollar renovation finished in 2007". Viking Hotel.

== South Carolina ==
- Francis Marion Hotel (1924), Charleston
- founding: John Rutledge House Inn (1763), Charleston
- founding: Kings Courtyard Inn (1853), Charleston
- The Dewberry (1964–65), Charleston. Mid-century modern building, originally the L. Mendel Rivers Federal Building, in the Charleston Historic District.
- Wentworth Mansion (1886), Charleston, Second Empire in style, in the Charleston Historic District.
- The Westin Poinsett (1925), Greenville
- Fulton Lane Inn (1889), Charleston

== South Dakota ==
- Hotel Alex Johnson (1928), Rapid City
- Hotel on Phillips (1917), Sioux Falls

== Tennessee ==
- The Peabody Memphis, Memphis
- General Morgan Inn & Conference Center (1884), Greeneville. Originally the Grand Hotel, later the Hotel Brumley. John Hunt Morgan was shot and fell here. Included in Greenville Historic District.
- 21c Museum Hotel Nashville by MGallery (1895) in NRHP-listed Second Avenue Commercial District.
- Union Station Hotel Nashville, Autograph Collection, Nashville. Within Union Station (Nashville), a former National Historic Landmark.
- Hermitage Hotel, Nashville. Claimed to be "the only remaining grand hotel in Nashville and the only commercial Beaux Arts structure in the state."

== Texas ==
- founding: Menger Hotel (1859), San Antonio
- Hotel Settles (1930), Big Spring
- The Stagecoach Inn (1852), Salado
- The Ashton Hotel, Fort Worth
- Hilton Fort Worth (1921), Fort Worth. Originally Hotel Texas
- The Statler (1956), Dallas
- The Whitehall, Houston
- Omni La Mansion Del Rio, San Antonio
- The Crockett Hotel (1909), San Antonio
- Emily Morgan San Antonio - a DoubleTree by Hilton Hotel (1924), San Antonio

Former members:

- The Sam Houston Hotel, Houston

== Utah ==
- Zion Lodge (1924), Springdale, designed by Gilbert Stanley Underwood, located in Zion National Park

== Vermont ==
- Castle Hill Resort and Spa, Cavendish
- The Middlebury Inn (1827?), Middlebury. Begun as the Vermont Hotel, a brick "public house" opened by Nathan Wood in 1827. Federal.
- Basin Harbor, Vergennes. On Lake Champlain. Eclectic.
- Woodstock Inn & Resort, Woodstock.

== Virginia ==
- founding: The Jefferson Hotel (1895), Richmond
- founding: The Martha Washington Hotel & Spa (1832), Abingdon
- founding: The Omni Homestead Resort (1766), Hot Springs, formerly The Homestead
- Airlie (1899), Warrenton. Also known as Airlie Conference Center, partly in original post office
- Blackburn Inn (1828), Staunton, Virginia, built as Western State Hospital (Staunton, Virginia)
- Colony House Motor Lodge (1959), Roanoke
- Inn at Willow Grove (1778), Orange
- The Mimslyn Inn (1931), Luray. Georgian Revival architecture. Included in Luray Downtown Historic District
- Stonewall Jackson Hotel & Conference Center (1924), Staunton. Stonewall Jackson Hotel
- The Virginian Lynchburg, Curio Collection by Hilton (1913), Lynchburg
- Williamsburg Inn (1937), Williamsburg
- Williamsburg Lodge, Autograph Collection, and Colonial Houses (1750), Williamsburg

Former members:

- Boar's Head Resort (1834), Charlottesville
- The Cavalier Virginia Beach, Autograph Collection (1927), Virginia Beach
- The Georges (1789), Lexington, in the Lexington Historic District
- The Hotel Roanoke & Conference Center, Curio - A Collection by Hilton (1882), Roanoke, NRHP-listed

== Washington ==
- Mayflower Park Hotel (1927), Seattle
- Fairmont Olympic Hotel (1924), Seattle. Originally the Olympic Hotel.

== West Virginia ==
Former members:

- Blennerhassett Hotel, Parkersburg

== Wisconsin ==
- The American Club (1918), Kohler. Walter J. Kohler Sr. founded it. Tudor-style.
- The Edgewater (1948), Madison. Art Deco
- Hilton Milwaukee City Center (1928), Milwaukee, built as the Schroeder Hotel
- The Pfister Hotel (1893), Milwaukee. Romanesque Revival

== Wyoming ==
- Old Faithful Inn (1904), Yellowstone National Park. A National Historic Landmark.
- Lake Yellowstone Hotel & Cabins (1891), Yellowstone National Park
- Sheridan Inn (1892), Sheridan
- Alpenhof Lodge (1965), Teton Village
- The Wort Hotel (1941), Jackson

== Washington, D.C. ==
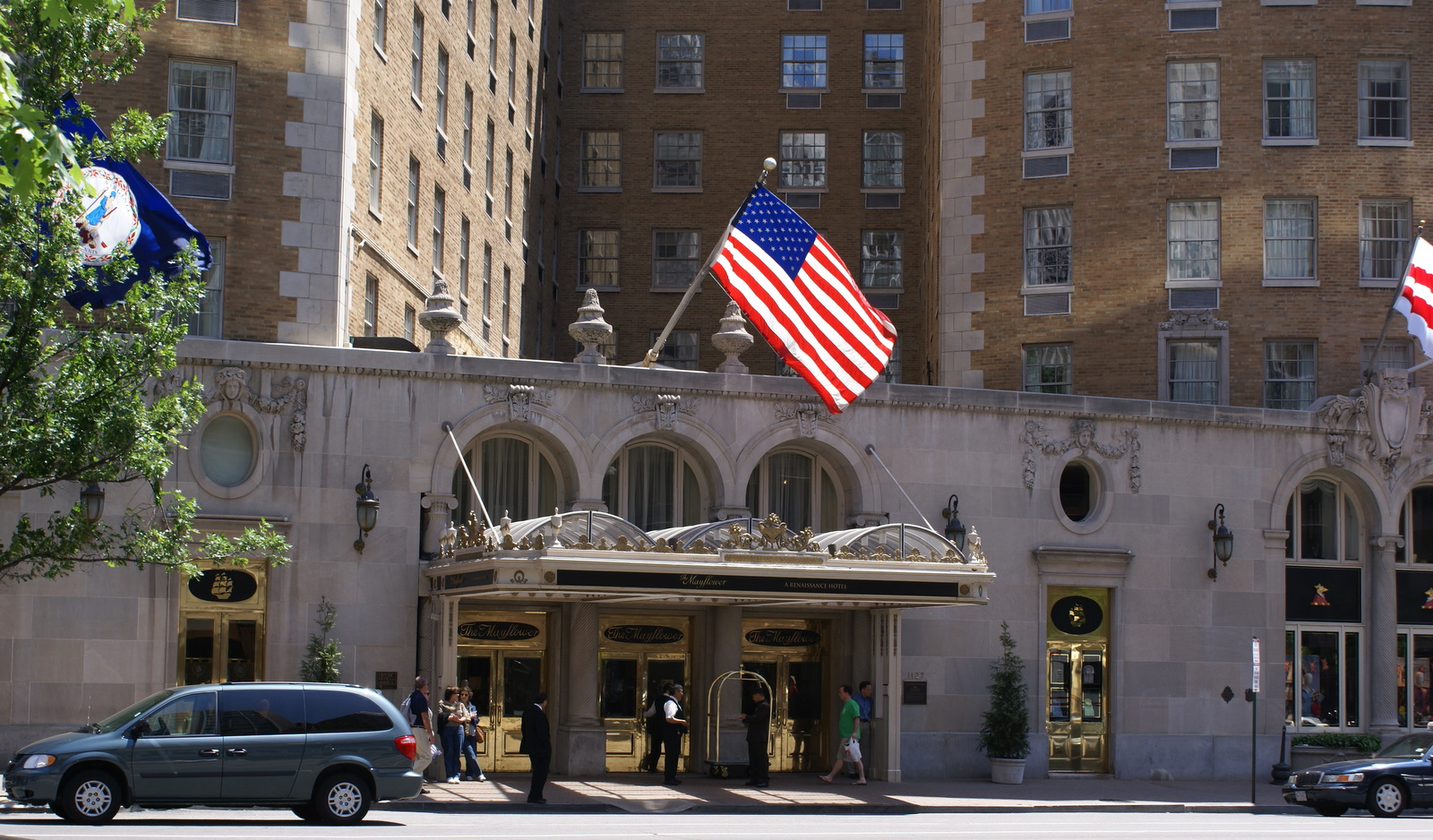
Mayflower Hotel

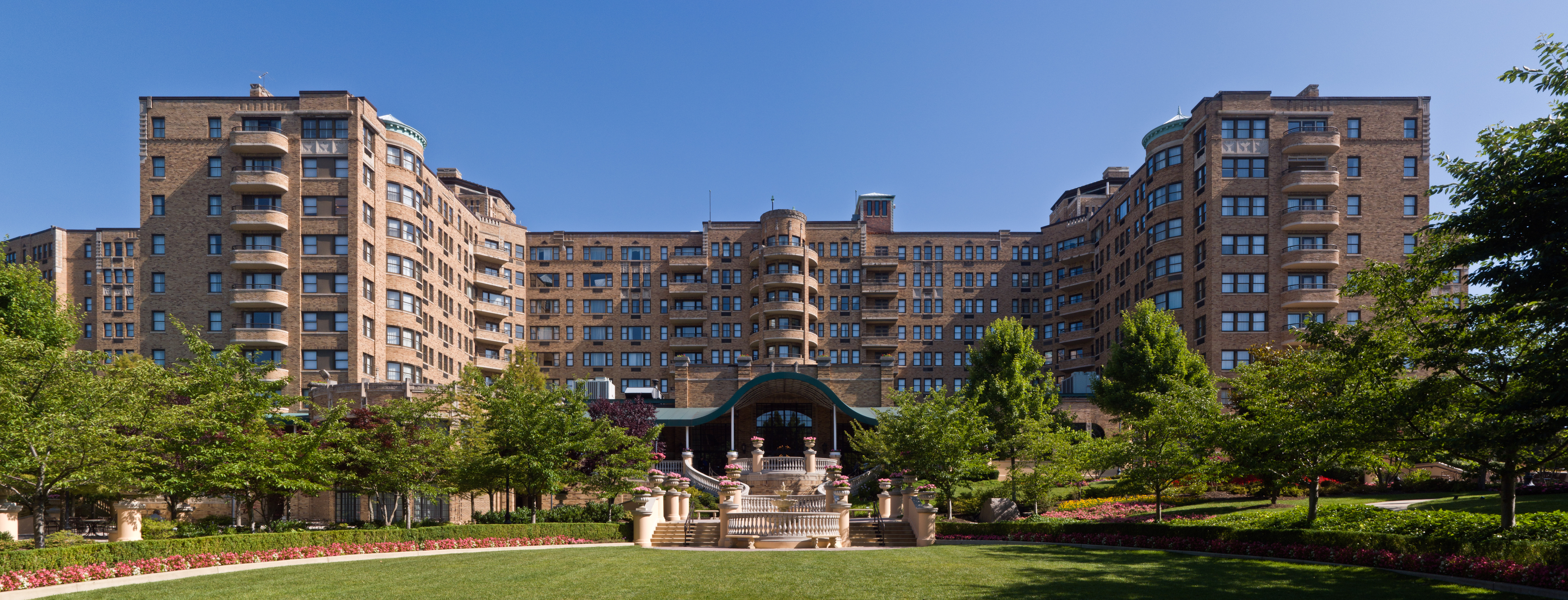
Omni Shoreham Hotel

- founding: Morrison-Clark Historic Inn (1864)
- founding: The Mayflower Hotel (1925)
- Capital Hilton (1943)
- The Churchill (1906), originally a luxury apartment building
- Georgetown Inn (1962)
- The Graham Georgetown, Tapestry Collection by Hilton (1962)
- Hamilton Hotel (1851)
- The Henley Park Hotel (1918)
- Hotel Lombardy (1929), converted to a hotel in 1994
- Melrose Georgetown Hotel (1947)
- Omni Shoreham Hotel (1930)
- Phoenix Park Hotel (1922)
- Riggs Washington DC (1891)
- Sofitel Washington DC Lafayette Square (1925)
- Willard InterContinental Washington (1901)
- Washington Hilton (1965)

== Puerto Rico ==
- Condado Vanderbilt Hotel (1919), San Juan
- El Convento Hotel (1651), San Juan, Spanish Colonial architecture
- Fairmont El San Juan Hotel (1958), San Juan

Former members:

- Caribe Hilton (1949), San Juan
- The Condado Plaza Hilton (1963), San Juan, International style

== U.S. Virgin Islands ==
Former members:

- The Buccaneer (1653), Christiansted

== Former members ==
Charter members of Historic Hotels of America no longer with the organization as of 2022 include: (Note: Per "Historic Hotels of America | Historic Hotels USA | Historic Hotel". www.historichotels.org.. Charter members that are not current members as of December 7, 2022, are The Admiral Hotel (1940), Mobile, Alabama; The Bellevue Hotel (1904), Philadelphia, Pennsylvania; and Timberline Lodge (1937), Mount Hood, Oregon.)

- The Admiral Hotel (1940), Mobile, Alabama
- The Bellevue Hotel (1904), Philadelphia
- Timberline Lodge (1937), Mount Hood, Oregon
