= Capital Hotel =

Capital Hotel may refer to:

in the United Kingdom

- Capital Hotel, London

in the United States

- Capital Hotel (Little Rock, Arkansas)
- Capital Hotel (Frankfort, Kentucky), historic hotel designed by Luckett & Farley
- Capital Hilton, Washington, D.C.
