= Dunhill =

Dunhill may refer to:

== People ==
- Alfred Dunhill (1872–1959), founder of the luxury goods company Alfred Dunhill Ltd.
- Alison Dunhill (born 1950), English artist and art historian
- David Dunhill (1917–2005), English radio announcer
- Thomas Dunhill (1877–1946), English composer and writer

== Places ==
- Dunhill, County Waterford, a town in County Waterford, Ireland

== Retail brands ==
- Alfred Dunhill Limited, a British luxury goods company owned by Richemont
- Dunhill (cigar), a brand of cigars owned by British American Tobacco
- Dunhill (cigarette), a brand of luxury cigarettes owned by British American Tobacco

== Sports and entertainment ==
- Dunhill Records, a record label (later ABC/Dunhill Records)
- Alfred Dunhill Cup, a former golf event
- Alfred Dunhill Links Championship, a golf event
- The Dunhill Trio, American dancers

== Other ==
- Dunhill Hotel in Charlotte, North Carolina
