= Inn on Boltwood =

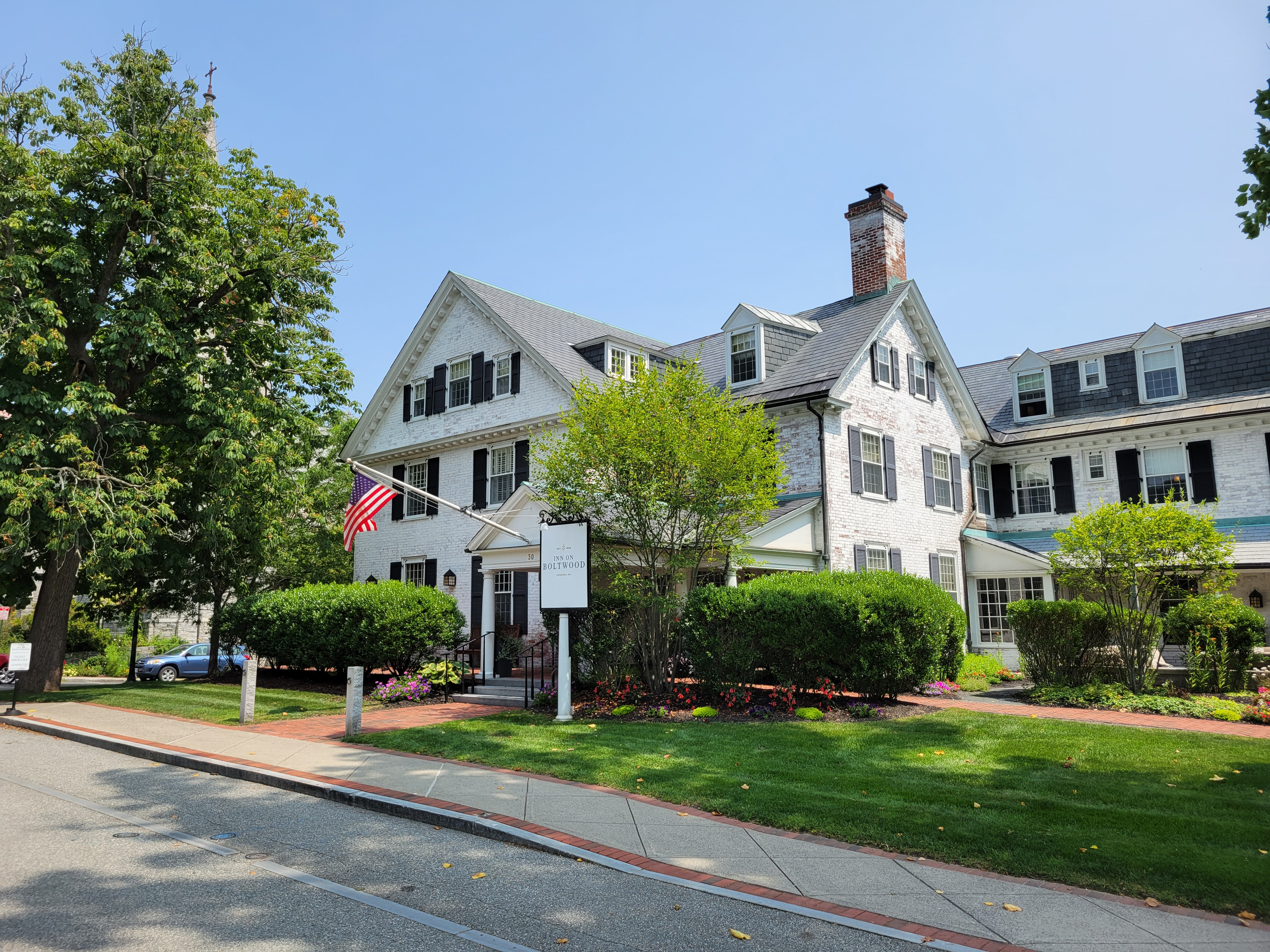
- Inn on Boltwood

- Location within Massachusetts

General information
- Location: 30 Boltwood Ave, Amherst, Massachusetts
- Coordinates: 42.374605°N 72.518632°W

The Inn on Boltwood, formerly known as The Lord Jeffrey Inn, in Amherst, Massachusetts, dates from 1926.

It is associated with Amherst College via ownership by the Amherst Inn Company, an affiliate of the college. It was renovated in 2012 and has Silver LEED Certification, in part relating to its inclusion of 50 geothermal wells, each 500 feet (150 m) deep, providing heating and cooling.

It includes Colonial Revival architecture.

Poet Robert Frost was a frequent guest. Archibald MacLeish was also a guest. A gala honoring Frost's 80th birthday was held at the property in 1954.

It is a member of the Historic Hotels of America.
