= Hotel Saranac =

Historic hotel in upstate New York, U.S.

- U.S. National Register of Historic Places
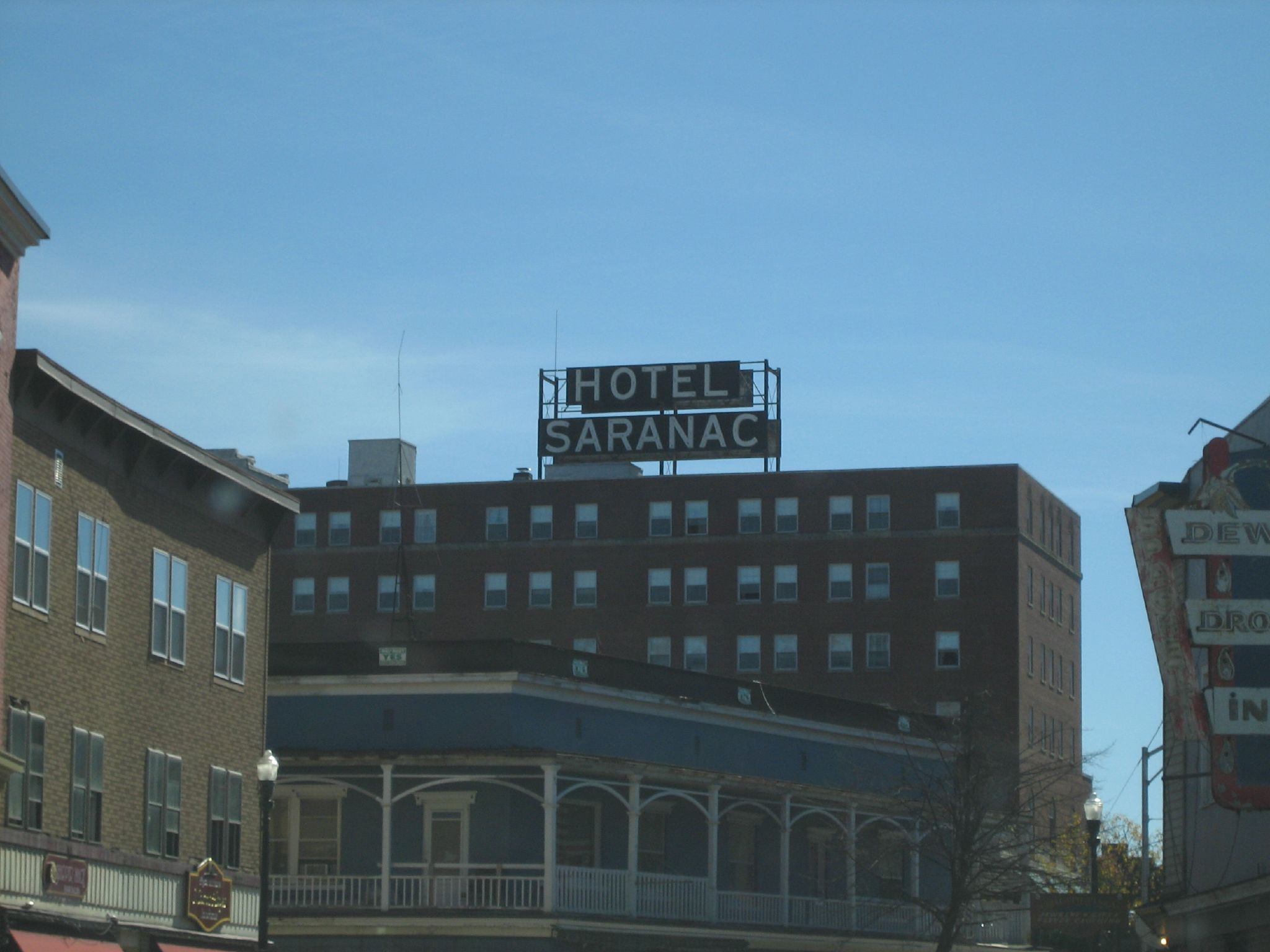

- Location within New York Location within the United States
- Location: 100 Main St, Saranac Lake, New York
- Coordinates: 44.326888°N 74.130495°W
- Built: 1927
- Architectural style: Colonial Revival
- NRHP reference No.: 100003627
- Added to NRHP: April 5, 2019

The Hotel Saranac is a historic hotel in Saranac Lake, New York, a town formerly served by the Adirondack Railway. Its full name is Hotel Saranac, Curio Collection by Hilton. The hotel has 102 rooms and 20 suites.

It was designed by local architects William Scopes and Maurice Feustmann in an austere Colonial Revival (or Neo-Georgian) style and built in 1927. The hotel is a symmetrically arranged, six-story building clad in brick veneer. In order to ensure fire safety, the hotel was built with steel framing and concrete floors. The large lobby on the second floor was modeled after the Grand Salon of the Davanzati Palace in Florence.

The hotel closed in 2013, underwent a $35-million renovation, and reopened in 2018. It was listed on the National Register of Historic Places in 2019.

It is a member of the Historic Hotels of America.

It claimed when opened to have been the first fireproof hotel in the Adirondacks.

It was owned and operated by Paul Smith's College from 1962 to 2006. It was used by the college for on-the-job training as part of its hotel, resort, and culinary management program.
