= Melrose Georgetown Hotel =

- Interactive map of the Melrose Georgetown Hotel area

General information
- Status: Operating
- Type: Hotel
- Location: Pennsylvania Avenue, Washington, D.C.
- Coordinates: 38°54′10″N 77°3′11″W
- Renovated: 2001 & 2008

Other information
- Parking: Paid

The Melrose Georgetown Hotel is a AAA 4-star luxury hotel located on Pennsylvania Avenue in Washington, D.C., United States. It was inducted into Historic Hotels of America, an official program of the National Trust for Historic Preservation, in 2021.

== Location ==
The Melrose Hotel is located 5 minutes from Foggy Bottom metro stop and 10 to 15 minutes from the center of Georgetown. It is located near the White House, the Potomac Riverfront, Georgetown, the National Mall, John F. Kennedy Center for the Performing Arts and George Washington University.

== Description ==
=== Public areas ===
The hotel's lobby features marble floors and fluted columns.

The hotel includes one restaurant, Jardenea, which features American-style food throughout the day. The hotel also offers seasonal al fresco dining facilities. The Library Bar features dark-panelled wood, and has outdoor patio space. Both the bar and restaurant are located near the lobby.

The hotel contains an all-day business center, wireless internet and 5,000 square feet (460 m^{2}) of function space. There is also a small gym with a full set of weights and six pieces of cardiovascular equipment but with no natural light.

=== Guest rooms ===
The hotel contains eight floors and 240 French-inspired rooms for guests, which were last renovated in 2013. Many rooms range from 400 to 425 square feet (37.2 to 39.5 m^{2}) in size, with 32-inch (810 mm) televisions and safes.
