= Hotel Brexton =

American hotel

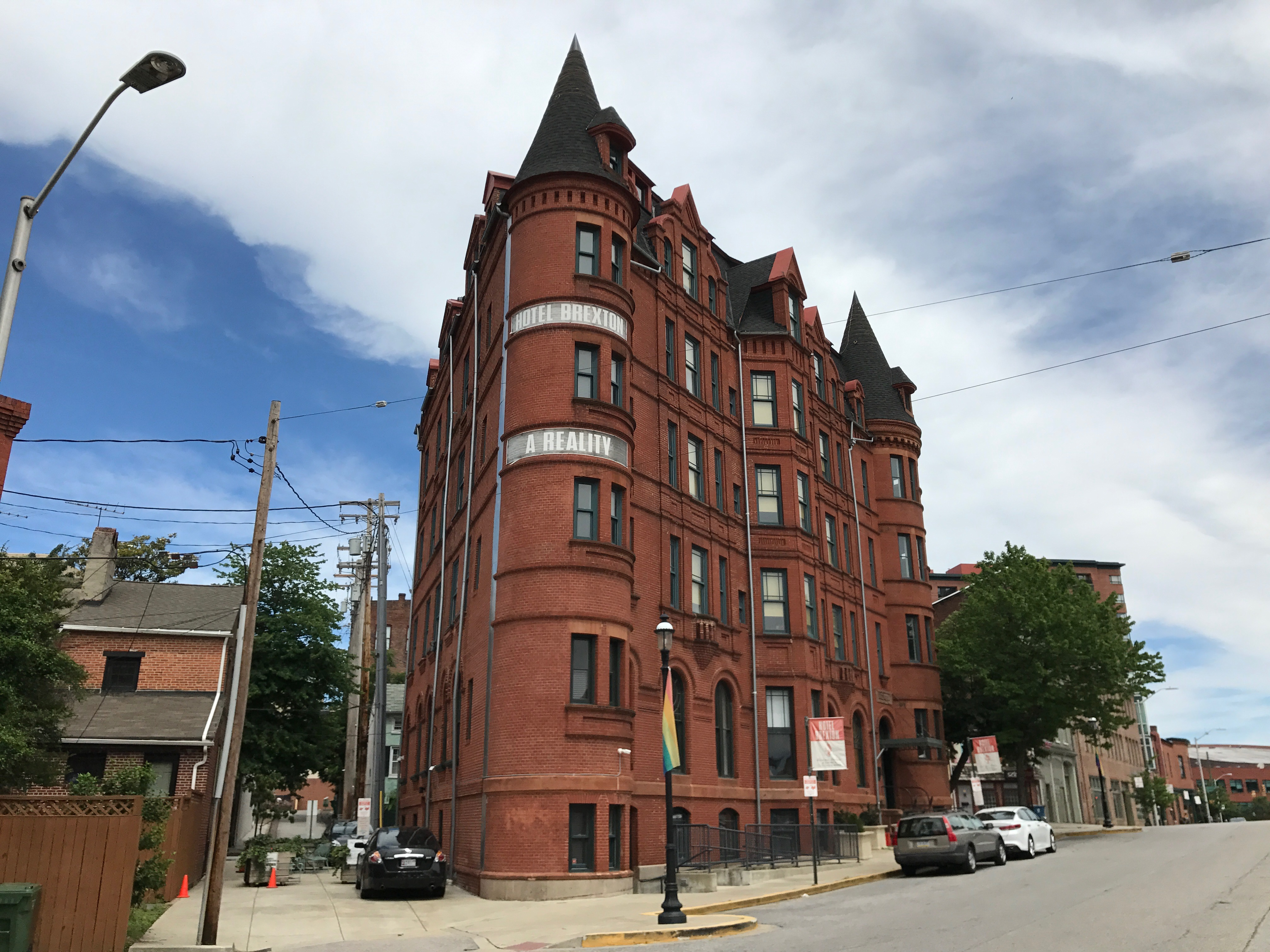

- Location within Maryland

General information
- Location: 868 Park Ave, Baltimore, Maryland, US
- Coordinates: 39°18′04″N 76°37′08″W
- Completed: 1881

The Hotel Brexton, in Baltimore, Maryland, United States, is a Queen Anne-styled building which was built in 1881. It was built as a residential hotel for Samuel Wyman, who was a Baltimore merchant. It is a member of the Historic Hotels of America, a program of the National Trust for Historic Preservation.

The Brexton is a six-story building made of Baltimore pressed brick and Scotch sandstone. The hotel's "most defining characteristic", according to the Historic Hotels of America program, was "its wonderful spiral staircase, which extended up through every floor of the hotel".

== Building ==
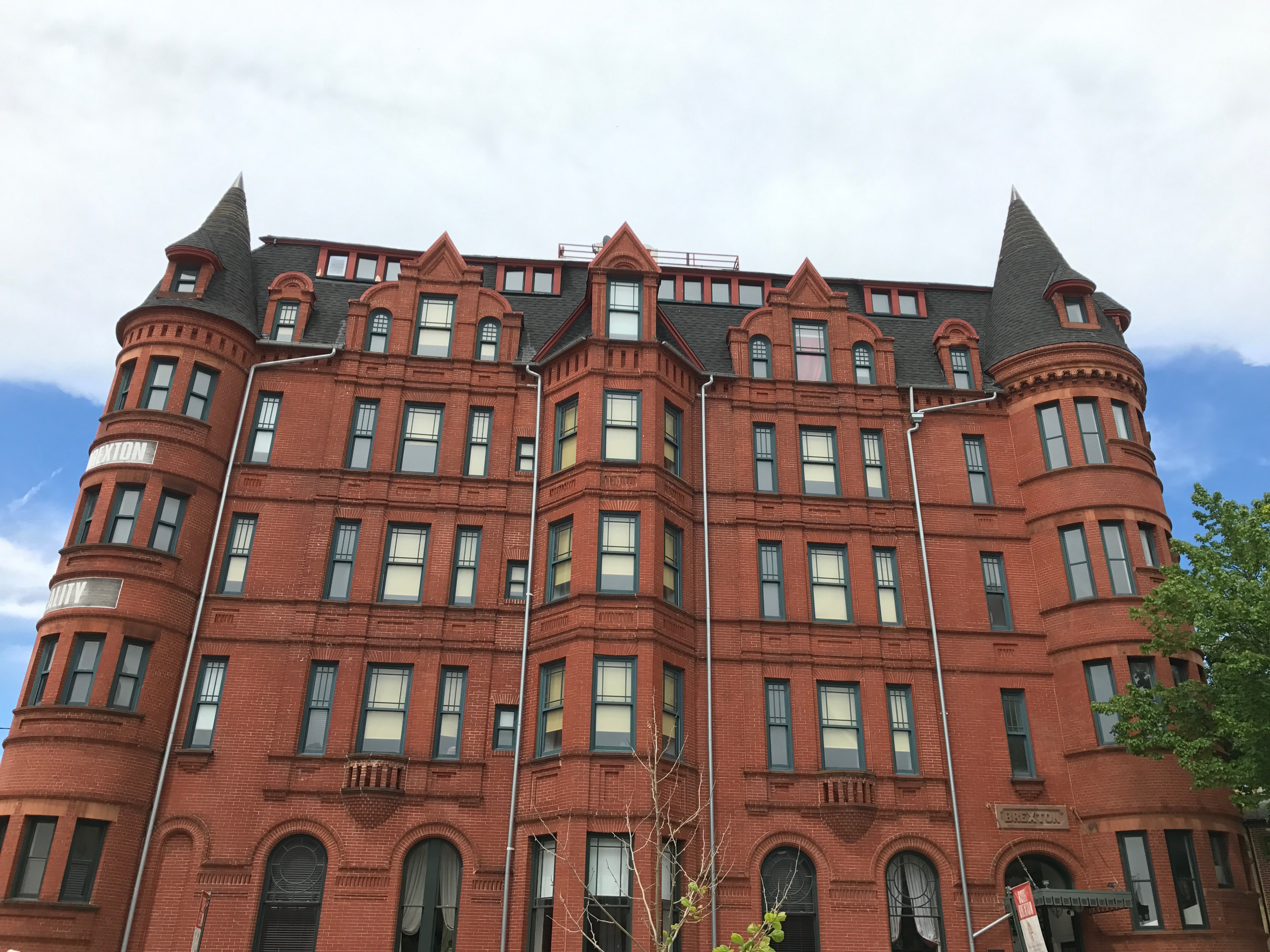
East-facing side Brexton Hotel. The spiral staircase is in the north turret, to the right

Designed by Charles E. Cassell, the Hotel Brexton was built as a six-story Queen Anne-style residential hotel with a spiral staircase from the lobby to the fifth floor of its north turret. The hotel opened to the public in 1891 with 60 rooms and was later turned into an apartment building.

The building had to be closed down in the 1970s due to its failure to comply with updated building codes, and it remained vacant for over 20 years. During this time, several concerned citizens vocalized interest in revitalizing the building, including Rose Pettus Hayes, who purchased the building in the 1970s for $55,000, and Roger Wood, who formed the Brexton Renaissance in 1997. The Brexton Renaissance served as a non-profit organization and registered charitable entity with the sole task of raising funding for and refurbishing the building. However, many of these attempts were insufficient at bringing the building up to code until it was purchased by Richard Naing of RWN Development Group.

In the early 2000s, Naing worked alongside architectural design architect Donald Kann to restore and renovate the hotel's interior and exterior, including reconfiguring the interior to create 29 guest rooms, including a Wallis Warfield Simpson suite. The work, completed in 2010 and costing $4.5 million, included the "replacement of over two hundred windows that had rotted or disappeared and the restoration of the original spiral stair."

In 2010, the Hotel Brexton received its name and received the 2010 Historic Preservation Award from Baltimore Heritage, Inc. It has since become a member of the Historic Hotels of America.

In 2018, Lonely Planet guidebook said the hotel had "been reborn as an appealing, if not overly lavish, hotel".

After being damaged by a lightning strike in 2018, the hotel closed for repairs and renovations.

== Wallis Simpson ==
The hotel was home of Bessie Wallis Warfield (1896–1986), who later became known as Wallis Simpson, the American divorcee for whom Edward VIII abdicated, during her formative years. Historical accounts differ as to Warfield's time at the hotel. One suggests that her mother took a small apartment and brought Bessie here following her father's death on November 15, 1896. Another accounts that T. Wallis Warfield and Bessie moved, at the end of summer 1896, to the then run-down Brexton Residential Hotel, which was T. Wallis's last home. The Washington Post suggested that Simpson and her mother moved to the Brexton in 1905.
