= Morris Inn at Notre Dame =

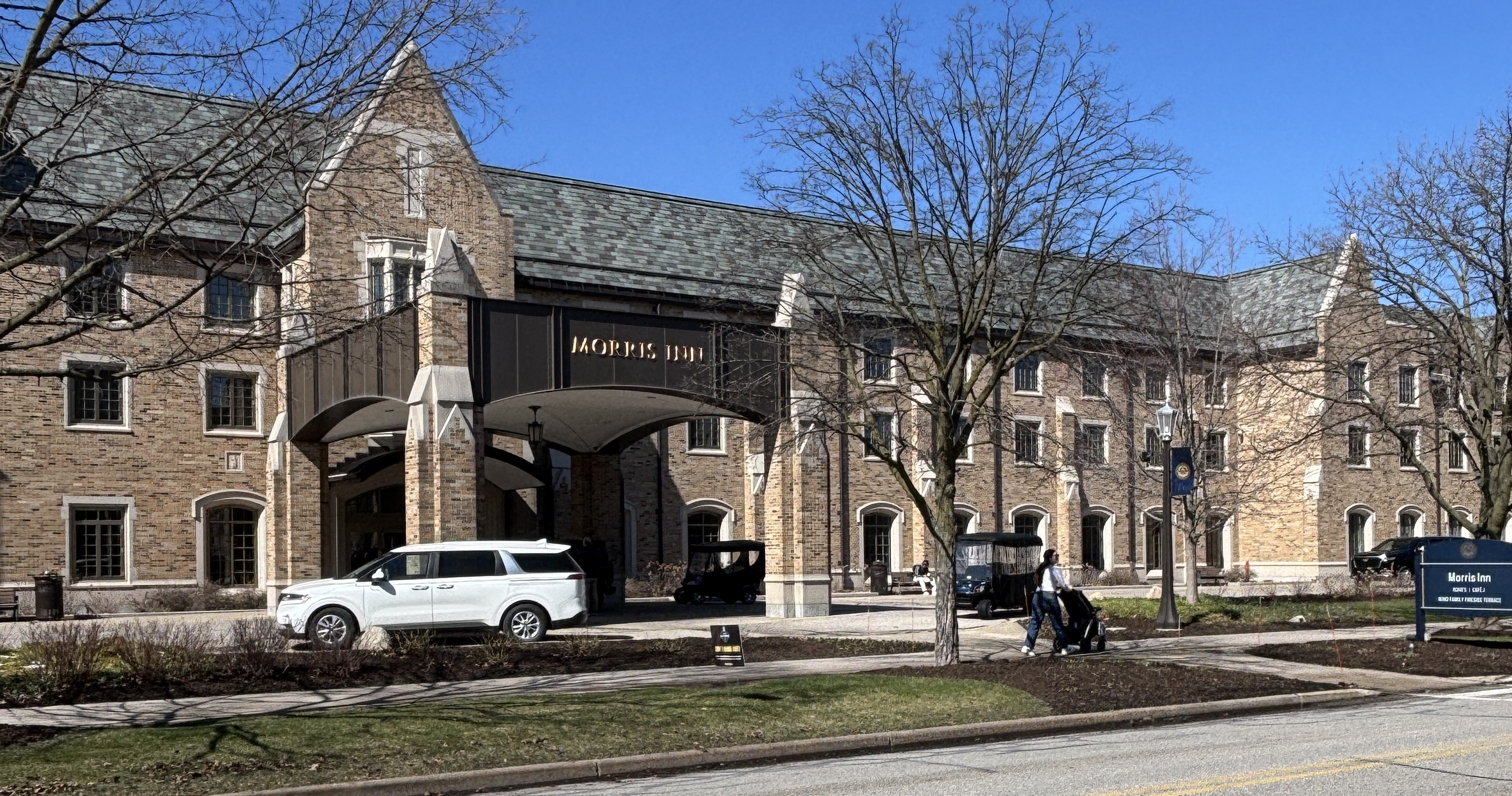

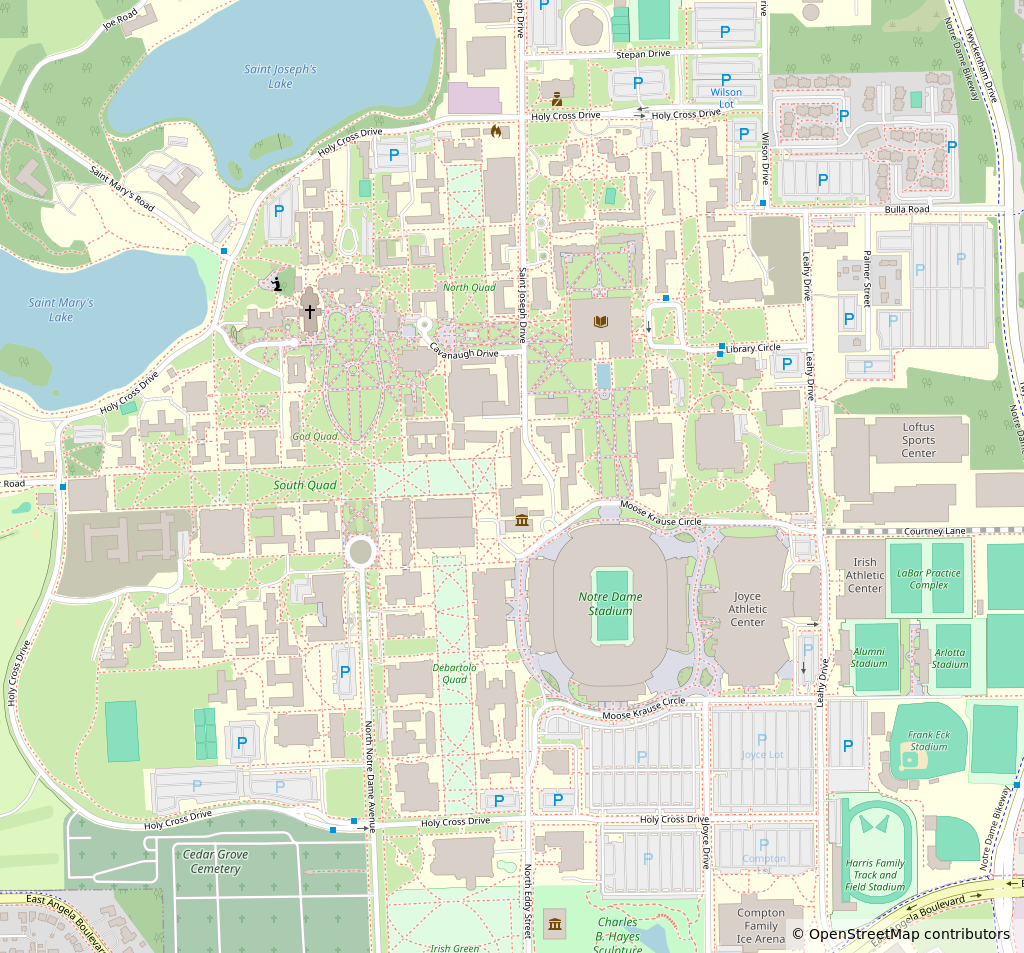
- Location within Notre Dame, Indiana

General information
- Location: 1399 North Notre Dame Ave, South Bend, Indiana
- Coordinates: 41.698184°N 86.239211°W
- Completed: April 1952
- Renovated: August 2013

The Morris Inn at Notre Dame is a Gothic Revival-style hotel owned by the University of Notre Dame and located on the school's campus in Notre Dame, Indiana (just outside South Bend, Indiana).

The inn was built with a $1 million bequest from Ernest M. Morris, an alumnus who attended Notre Dame at the turn of the century. It was dedicated in April 1952 with 92 rooms.

The inn closed in October 2012 and reopened 10 months later after a $30-million renovation. The renovation included expansion to 150 rooms in a 138,000-square-foot building with a 300-seat ballroom, business center, fitness room, and tavern. Upon its reopening, the property received a four-diamond rating from AAA – the only Indiana hotel north of Indianapolis to receive that rating.

It is a member of the Historic Hotels of America.

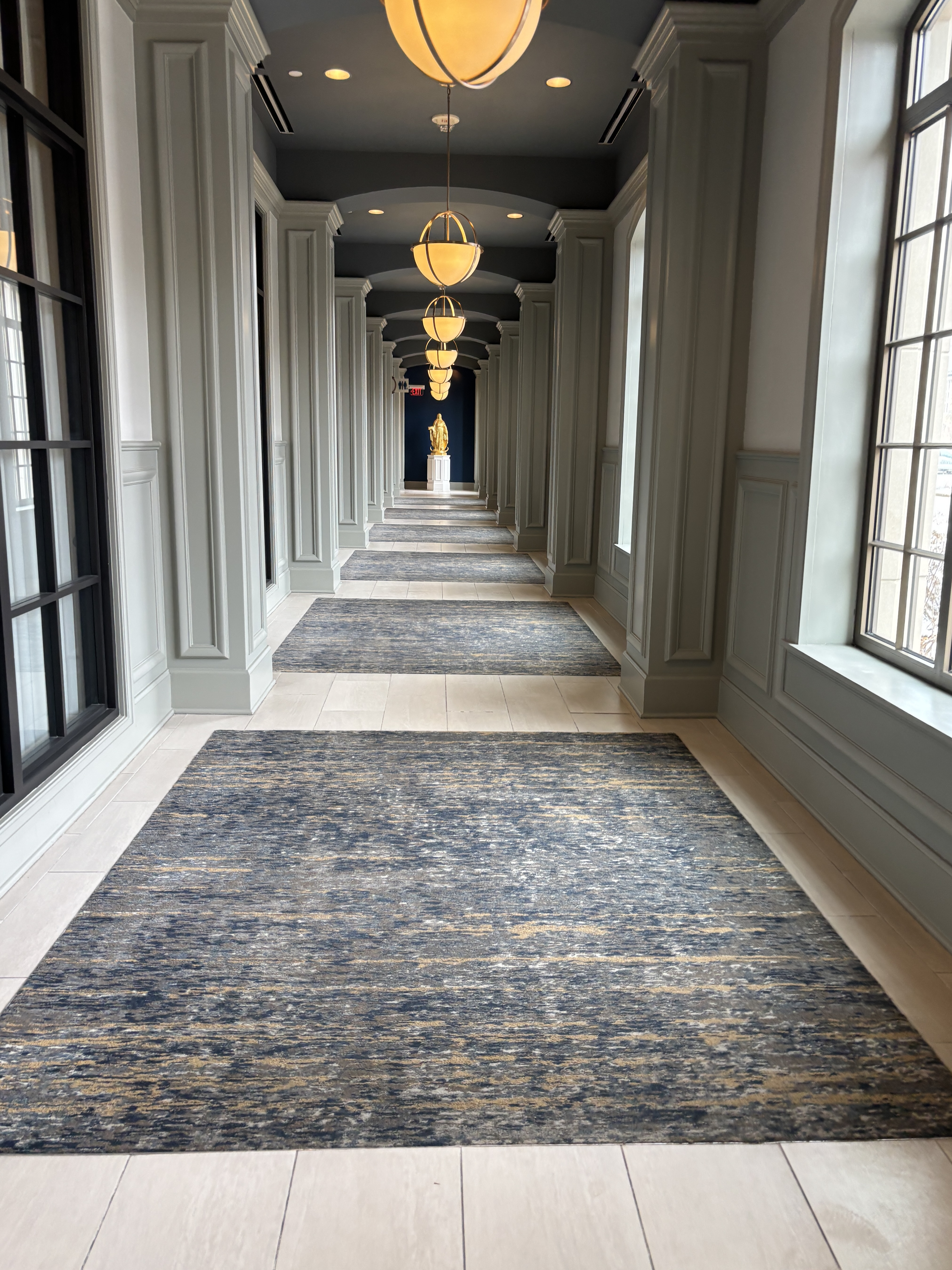
Interior of the Morris Inn

While of age and architecture comparable to some other historic ND buildings, and is adjacent to some included in the National Register of Historic Places listing for University of Notre Dame Campus-Main and South Quadrangles, it is not itself included in that district.
