= Hilton Santa Fe Historic Plaza =

Hotel in Santa Fe, New Mexico, United States

- Location within New Mexico Hilton Santa Fe Historic Plaza (the United States)

General information
- Location: Sandoval St., Santa Fe, New Mexico
- Coordinates: 35.687454°N 105.942536°W

The Hilton Santa Fe Historic Plaza, formerly known as the Santa Fe Hilton Hotel Inn, is a hotel that opened in 1973 in the historic center of Santa Fe, New Mexico. The hotel was built on a four-acre parcel that included two 18th-century adobe houses associated with one of the city's oldest families. The Nicholas Ortiz III house was converted into the hotel's gift shop, and the Antonio Jose Ortiz house became the hotel's restaurant and lounge.

== History ==
In 1970, the Springer Corporation of Albuquerque submitted a bid to the Santa Fe Urban Renewal Board to develop and build a 153-room, $3.5-million Hilton-franchised motor hotel on the tract. Springer's bid called for the preservation of the Ortiz adobes. The Springer bid was accepted, and the property was transferred in October 1971 for $390,607. A groundbreaking ceremony was held May 1972 attended by Governor Bruce King. The main hotel building was a three-story, split-level structure designed by architect William W. Ellison in the city's traditional Territorial Style with 161 guest rooms.

During construction, weaknesses in the historic adobes required rebuilding of several walls and replacement of some of the original adobe bricks. A retaining wall was also built to support the Nicholas Ortiz house. The hotel was completed in January 1973 and became known as the Santa Fe Hilton Hotel Inn.

In February 1974, the Santa Fe and Albuquerque Hilton Hotels were sold by Springer to Dallas-based Bridewell Development Corp. The hotel underwent a $3-million renovation in late 1985. The hotel was re-branded as the Hilton Santa Fe Historical Plaza in 2005.

It is a member of the Historic Hotels of America.
