= La Posada de Santa Fe =

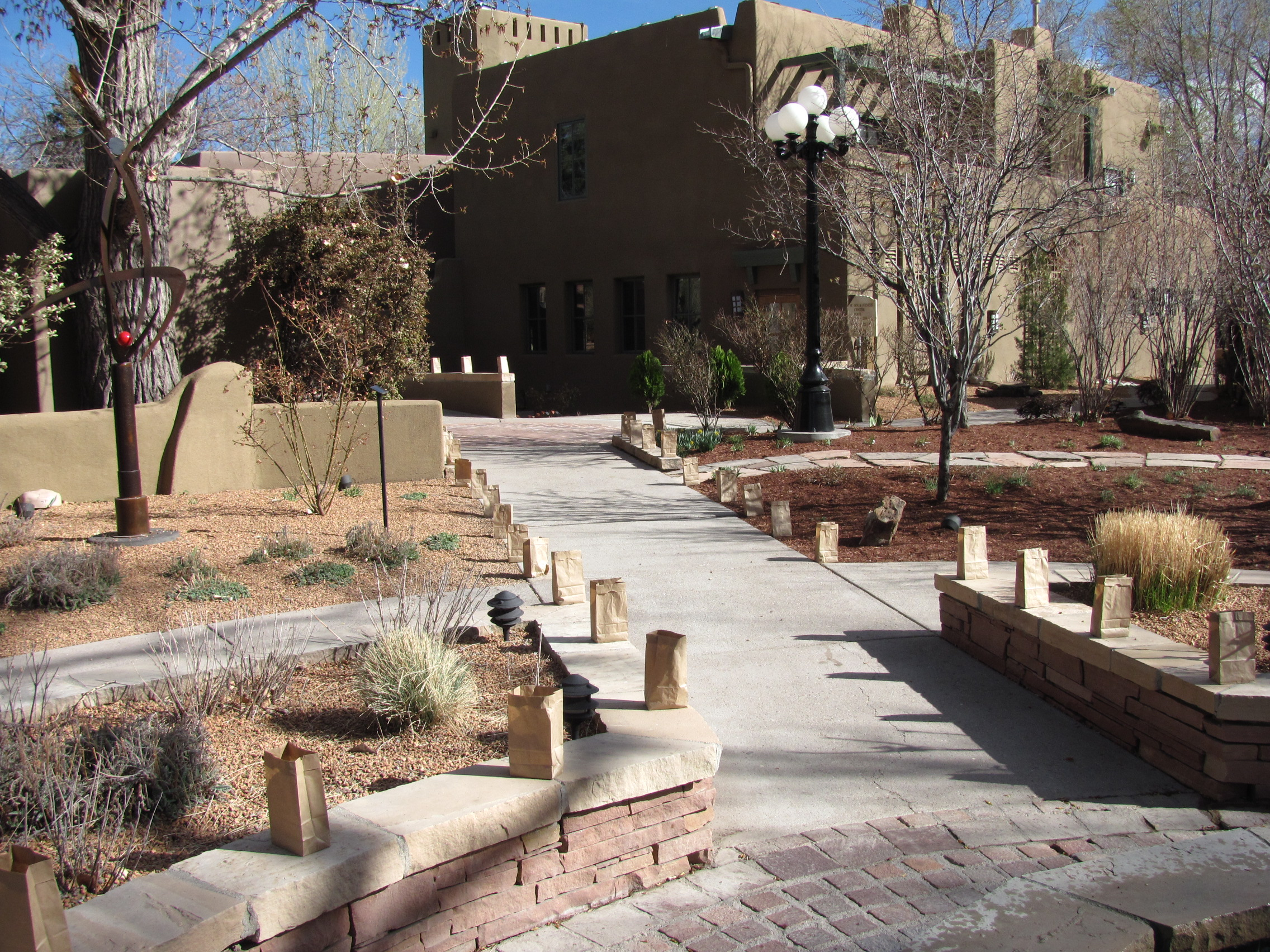
- La Posada in 2011
- Interactive map of the La Posada de Santa Fe area
- Hotel chain: Tribute Portfolio

General information
- Location: 330 East Palace Avenue, Santa Fe, New Mexico
- Coordinates: 35.686249°N 105.932882°W
- Completed: 1882
- Renovated: 1935, 1987 and 1988

La Posada de Santa Fe, formerly known as La Posada Inn, is a hotel in Santa Fe, New Mexico, that dates back to a mansion built in 1882.

== Staab mansion ==
In 1882, merchant Abraham Staab, honoring a promise he made to his wife Julia on their wedding day of one day building her the finest house money could buy, built a three-story French Second Empire-style mansion in the heart of Santa Fe. It was the first brick mansion in Santa Fe. The property was home for Staab, his wife and their seven children. Some accounts claim that the property is haunted by the spirit of Abraham's wife, Julia Schuster Staab, who according to legend became a total recluse after the death of her and Abraham's youngest child. Julia died in 1896 and Abraham in 1913.

== Creation of La Posada Inn ==
In 1930, Robert H. Nason of Chicago purchased the Staab home and surrounding acreage. Nason built a Santa Fe-style building with 30 apartments on the property. The apartment building, designed and built by Dick Riley, opened in 1935 under the name La Posada. The original mansion was also converted into eight apartments. Nason then added a hotel, the La Posada Inn, and a restaurant, the Cactus Tea Room. The inn was leased to Mr. and Mrs. Harvey S. Durand Jr. in 1953.

== Subsequent renovations ==
In 1987 and 1988, the owners undertook a $2-million renovation of the Posada's bar and guest rooms (including casitas that had served as stables or outbuildings on the Staab estate), and addition of eight new rooms in a separate executive-suite complex.

The Posada was purchased in 1997 by Olympus Corp., a Dallas real-estate firm. The new owner closed the property in November 1998 for a renovation and expansion, designed by architects Lloyd & Tryk, that reportedly cost between $12 and $18 million. It reopened in August 1999 with 159 rooms, nine new buildings, a 5,000-square-foot spa, 4,500 square feet of meeting and conference space, a new swimming pool, and 40 new rooms for a total of 159 casitas and suites. The new structures were designed to conform either to the property's pueblo or territorial-style architecture.

In 2013, Joseph C. Smith purchased the property from the prior owner's lender. Smith affiliated the hotel with Starwood Hotels & Resorts.

It is a member of the Historic Hotels of America.
