= Alpenhof Lodge =

- U.S. National Register of Historic Places
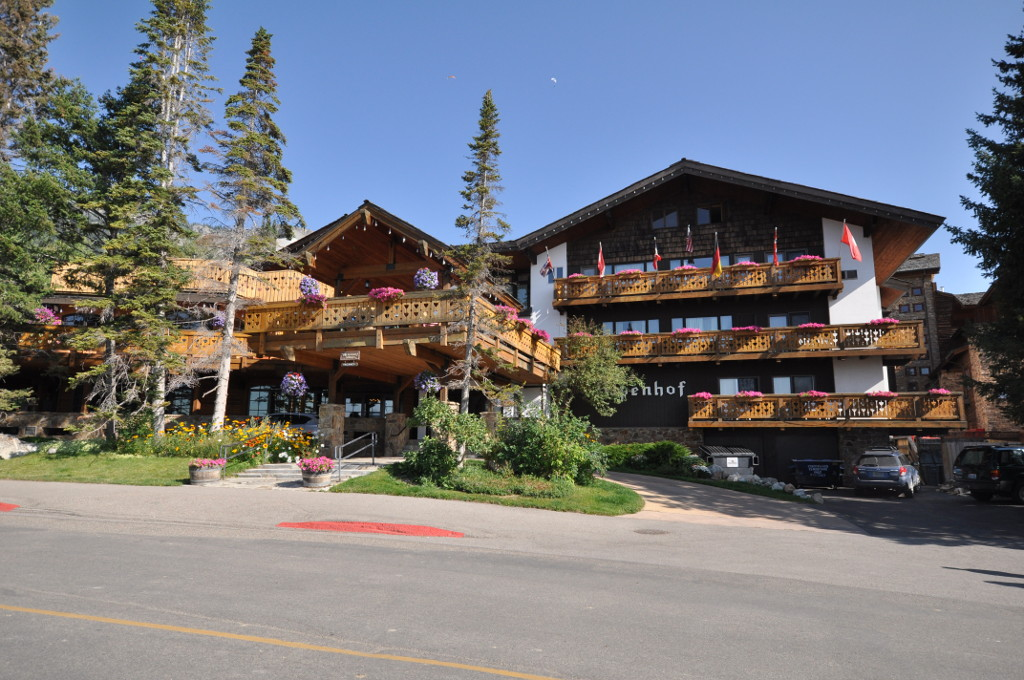

- Location within Wyoming Location within the United States
- Location: 3255 W. Village Dr., Teton Village, Wyoming
- Coordinates: 43.587907°N 110.826118°W
- Area: .78 acres (0.32 ha)
- Built: 1965, 1977
- Architect: Otto Burmell
- NRHP reference No.: 16000520
- Added to NRHP: August 9, 2016

The Alpenhof Lodge in Teton Village in Teton County, Wyoming is an Alpine style hotel that was built in 1965. It was listed on the National Register of Historic Places in 2016. Alpenhof Lodge has also been a member of Historic Hotels of America, an official program of the National Trust for Historic Preservation, since 2017.

== Significance ==
It was deemed significant as a historic tourist accommodation. Designed by architect Otto Burmell and built in 1965, it was expanded in 1977 and modified again in 1992 and in 2001. It was the first Alpine Swiss style development in Teton County.

With notable mentions in Architectural Digest in December 2017, named the 2018 Best of Jackson Hole Apres Ski by Planet Jackson Hole and given the 2019 Certificate of Excellence by Trip Advisor
