= Cork Factory Hotel =

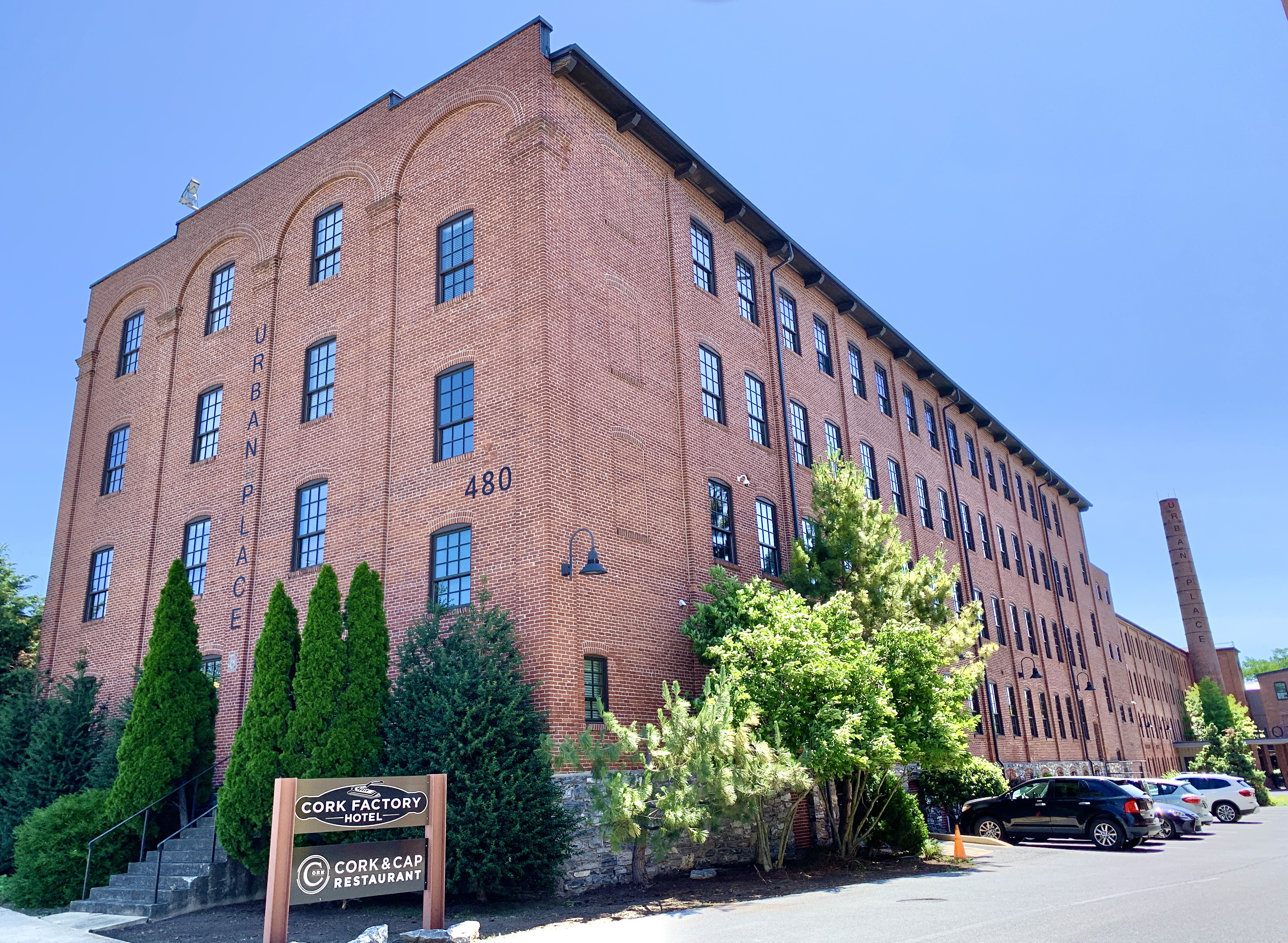

- Location within Pennsylvania

General information
- Location: 480 New Holland Drive, Lancaster, Pennsylvania
- Coordinates: 40.046167°N 76.295333°W

The Cork Factory Hotel, in Lancaster, Pennsylvania, USA, is a hotel that opened in 2009 in a redeveloped cork factory dating to 1865. The plant was variously known as the Lancaster Cork Works and the Lancaster Closure Plant.

== History ==
The property was operated as a cork factory dating to 1865 and was acquired in the late 19th century by Armstrong Cork Co., later renamed Armstrong World Industries. In 1929, Armstrong consolidated its cork operations at the site, making Lancaster "the 'cork capital' of the world". At that time, the "Cork Works" on New Holland Avenue manufactured a wide array of cork products, including soles and heels for shoes and cork-lined metal tops for soft drink bottles. The company's linoleum manufacturing business developed using by-products from cork manufacturing. The plant was later used for closure and plastic container manufacturing and became known as the Lancaster Closure Plant.

In 1969, Armstrong sold its packaging business, including the Lancaster Closure Plant, to Kerr Glass Manufacturing Corp. Kerr manufactured plastic bottles at the plant but ceased operations there in 2000.

== Redevelopment ==
In 2004, Barry Baldwin acquired the property for $1.2 million with plans to redevelop the site into "Urban Place", a mixed use complex of retail, restaurants, offices, apartments and a hotel. The hotel opened in 2010.

The hotel is a member of the Historic Hotels of America.
