= Mayflower Park Hotel =

Hotel in Seattle, Washington, US

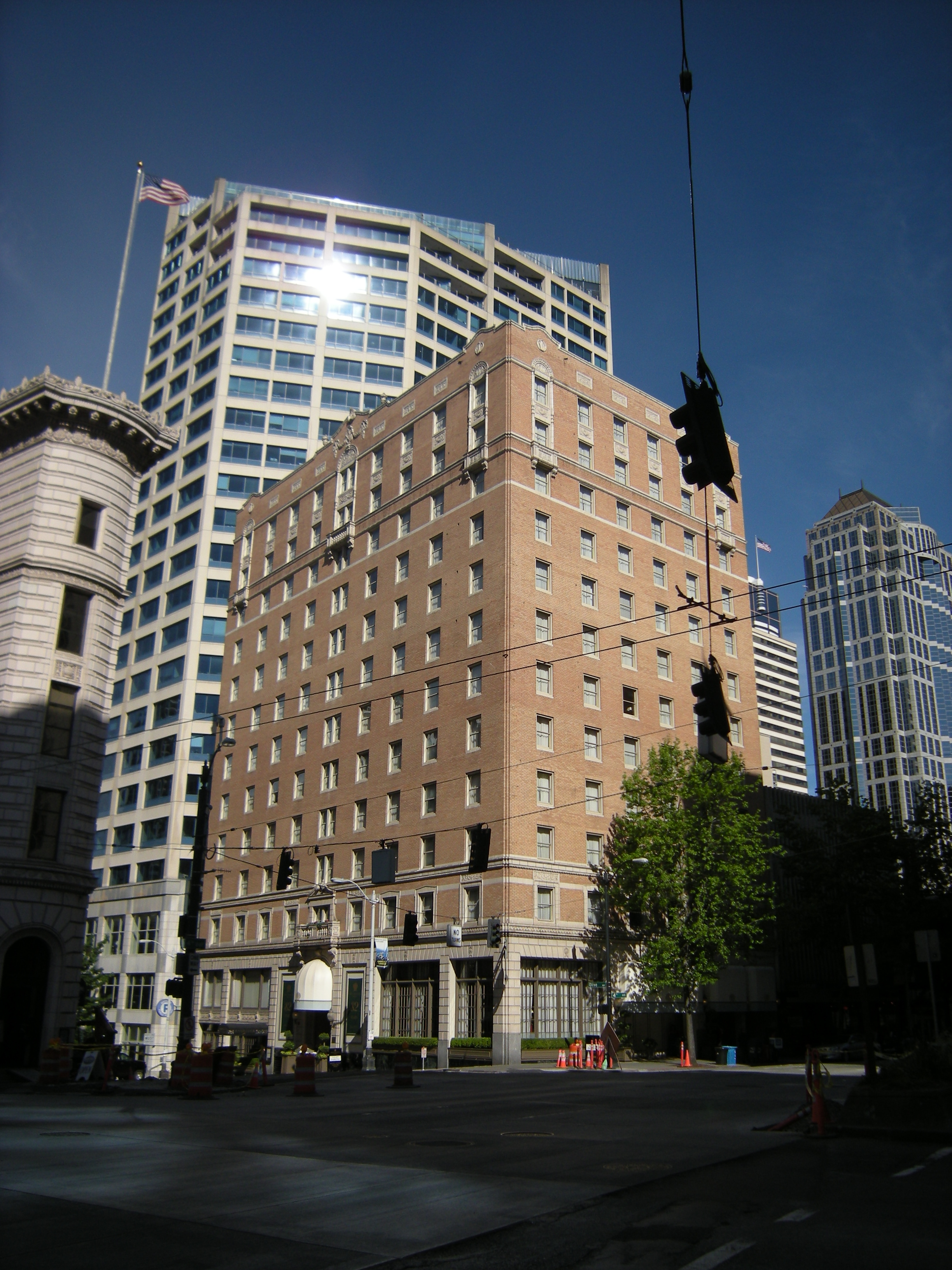
- Hotel in 2009. The Times Square Building (1916) peeks out at left.

- Location within Washington (state)

General information
- Location: 405 Olive Way, Seattle, Washington
- Coordinates: 47.612220°N 122.338091°W

The Mayflower Park Hotel in Seattle, Washington is a historic hotel built in 1927, which claims to be the oldest continuously operating hotel in downtown Seattle. Its façade includes extensive terra cotta detailing.

== History ==
The Bergonian Hotel was built by Stephen Berg, a prominent Seattle realtor and builder, who had previously built a number of other hotels in the city, as well as apartments and family homes. It was designed by the firm of Stuart & Wheatley, who had worked with Berg on several previous projects that incorporated his surname (The Stephensberg and Berg, later Biltmore, apartments on Capitol Hill). With 240 rooms, it was constructed in six months at a cost of $750,000, opening to the public ahead of schedule on the evening of July 16, 1927. The hotel was sold in 1933 and renamed the Hotel Mayflower. The hotel was renamed the Mayflower Park Hotel in 1974, after it was bought for $1.1 million by a limited partnership that gave control to Marie and Birney Dempcy. The hotel had been in foreclosure and was in need of repairs, necessitating an extensive renovation.

The hotel currently has 160 rooms, and six meeting and banquet rooms. The hotel is adjacent to the Westlake Center, a mall and office complex which was built in the 1980s and has a direct connection between the buildings. The mall's construction plan originally included demolition of the hotel, but it was saved by a lawsuit from the ownership group.

It is a member of the Historic Hotels of America, and was named the "Best Historic Hotel (76-200 Guestrooms)" in the 2017 Historic Hotels Awards of Excellence.

On January 6, 2024, the hotel lost Michael Basconcillo, a 27-year bellman/valet/security guard. Many considered “Michael B” to be the face of the hotel. A famous photo of him opening the door and tipping his iconic bolo hat still resides in the lobby, along with his signature gloves and his hat.
