= Hotel Lombardy =

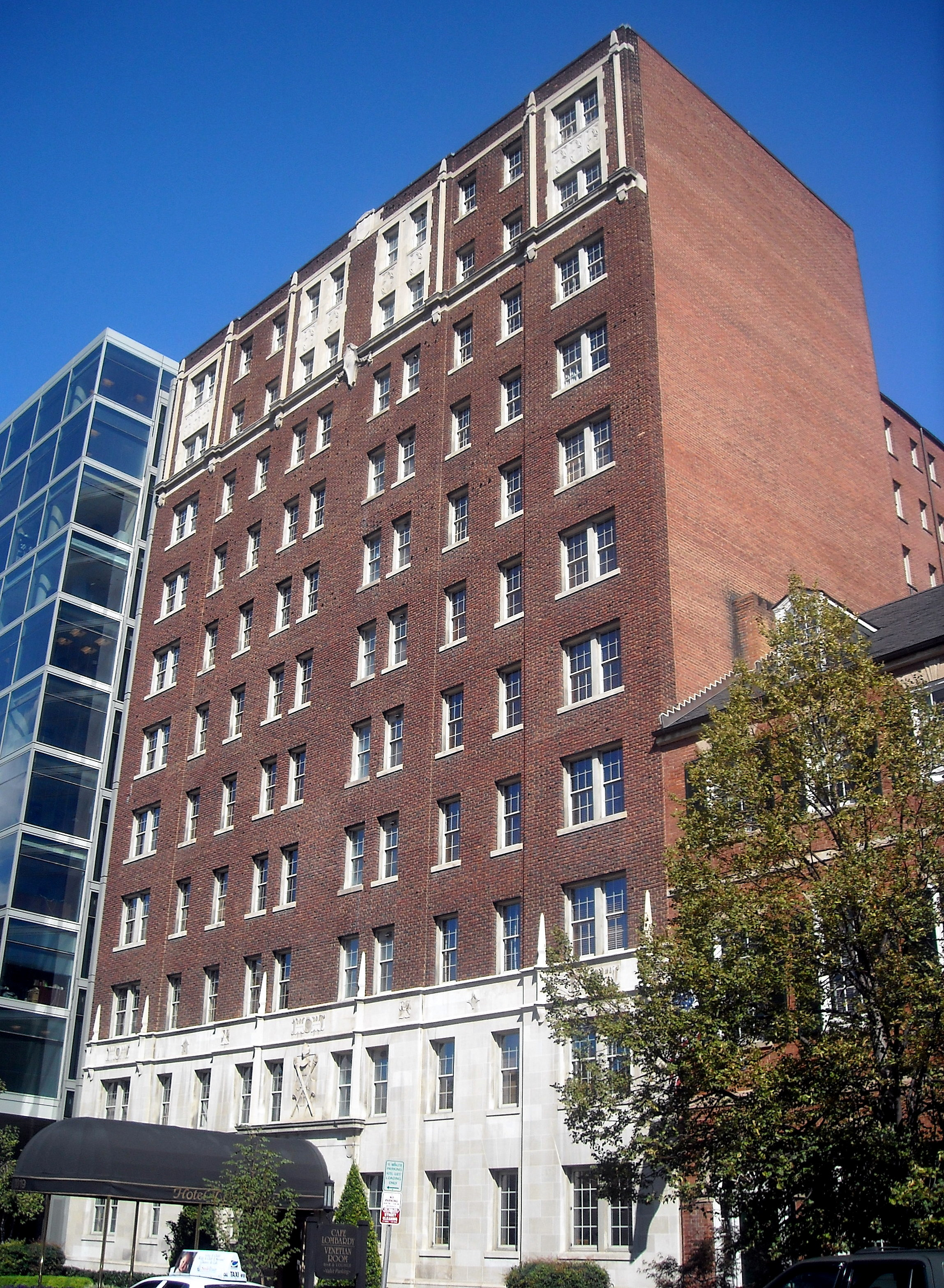

- Location within the District of Columbia

General information
- Location: 2019 Pennsylvania Ave NW., Washington, D.C.
- Coordinates: 38.901683°N 77.046286°W
- Completed: 1929

Hotel Lombardy, is a historic Washington, D.C. hotel located at 2019 Pennsylvania Avenue. Built in 1929 as a private residence, it was converted to a hotel in 1994. Since 2004, it has been a member of the National Trust for Historic Preservation's Historic Hotels of America program.

== Clientele ==
Due to its proximity to the White House, World Bank and International Monetary Fund headquarters, and other government buildings, the hotel commonly hosts foreign dignitaries and businesspeople.

In 2022, the President of Mexico, Andrés Manuel López Obrador, stayed at the hotel for his meeting with U.S. President Joe Biden.
