= Napa River Inn =

- Interactive map of the Napa River Inn area

General information
- Type: Hotel
- Location: Napa Valley, California, U.S.
- Coordinates: 38.2964°N 122.2830°W
- Completed: 1884

Napa River Inn, in Napa Valley, California, is a historic hotel dating from 1884. It is located on the Napa River within part of the Historic Napa Mill, which is now also a commercial establishment with dining, shopping, spa treatments, and entertainment. The Inn is locally owned and operated by the same family that began the award-winning adaptive reuse project that opened in 1999.

The Hatt/Napa Mill building are the last vestiges of the industrial makeup of Napa from the 1800s through the 1970s. The buildings have local landmark status and National Register of Historic Places listings. In 1884 Captain Albert Hatt used the mill as a warehouse for serving local vineyards. The Napa River Inn was built inside the historic Napa mill building in the 1990s, "with interior design inspiration coming from the renowned Sandra Blake." Many historical components remain in the main building. Two additional buildings reflect the modern luxury aspects of today's aesthetics focusing on comfort and convenience for today's traveler. The Inn is located on the Napa River and is walkable distance to all of downtown Napa's winetasting rooms, restaurants and attractions, including the Oxbow Market and the Napa Valley Wine Train.

The inn was listed on the National Registry of the Historic Hotels of America in 2004.

While in 2012, approval to expand the hotel by 26 rooms, adding a third floor, was received. No work has been started to date.
