= Willow Grove Inn =

The Inn at Willow Grove
- Interactive map of the The Inn at Willow Grove area
- Former names: Willow Grove Inn and Willow Grove Plantation
- Alternative names: Willow Grove Inn

General information
- Status: Completed
- Architectural style: Classical Revival architecture
- Location: Orange County, Virginia, Orange, United States
- Coordinates: 38.27334°N 78.13202°W
- Completed: 1778
- Opened: 1778

Website
- innatwillowgrove.com

Willow Grove Inn (officially known as The Inn at Willow Grove) is a hotel in Orange, Virginia, United States.

The basic structure of the building was built by Joseph Clark in 1778. In 1820, his son added a brick wing.

The exterior of the building reflects Thomas Jefferson's Classical Revival architecture, but the interior reflects Federal-style architecture.

The Inn at Willow Grove has also been a member of Historic Hotels of America, the official program of the National Trust for Historic Preservation, since 2017.

== See also ==
- List of Historic Hotels of America
