= Newport Beach Hotel & Suites =

Historic hotel in Rhode Island

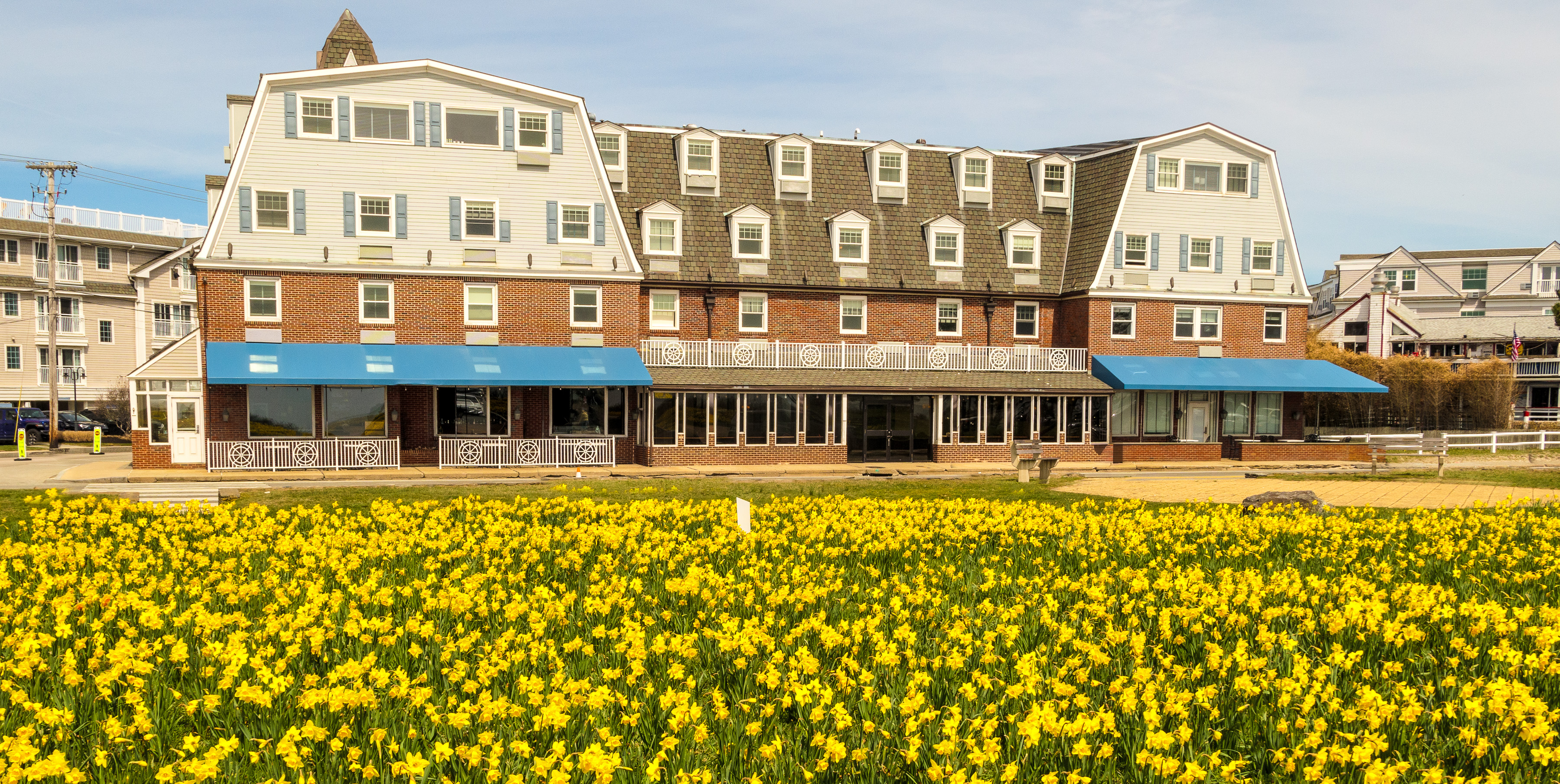
- Location: 30 Wave Ave., Middletown, Rhode Island
- Coordinates: 41.490091°N 71.285546°W
- Built: 1940

Newport Beach Hotel & Suites, in Middletown, Rhode Island, is a historic hotel that opened in 1940. It has also been known as the Inn at Newport Beach. It is a member of the Historic Hotels of America program of the National Trust for Historic Preservation.

It faces out over what is now Dunlap-Wheeler Park to Easton Bay and the Atlantic Ocean and provides views of the region's Cliff Walk.

The original building at 1 Wave Avenue, which dates to 1940, was built by the Toppa family, two years after the 1938 New England hurricane had destroyed beach establishments in the area. It was claimed to be positioned about 100 feet (30 m) feet from the rocks and ocean, but it may be further away.

According to Discover Newport: "With its meticulously restored gambrel style historic hotel and contemporary shingle style all suites addition, this seaside resort combines historic charm with contemporary sophistication."

The hotel reopened in 2008 after renovations which retained "its historic New England seaside charm," and resulted in the addition of a second building. It has been a member of Historic Hotels of America since 2000.

In 2023, the hotel was sold to Procaccianti Companies, but it will continue to operate under the same name.
