= Bedford Village Inn =

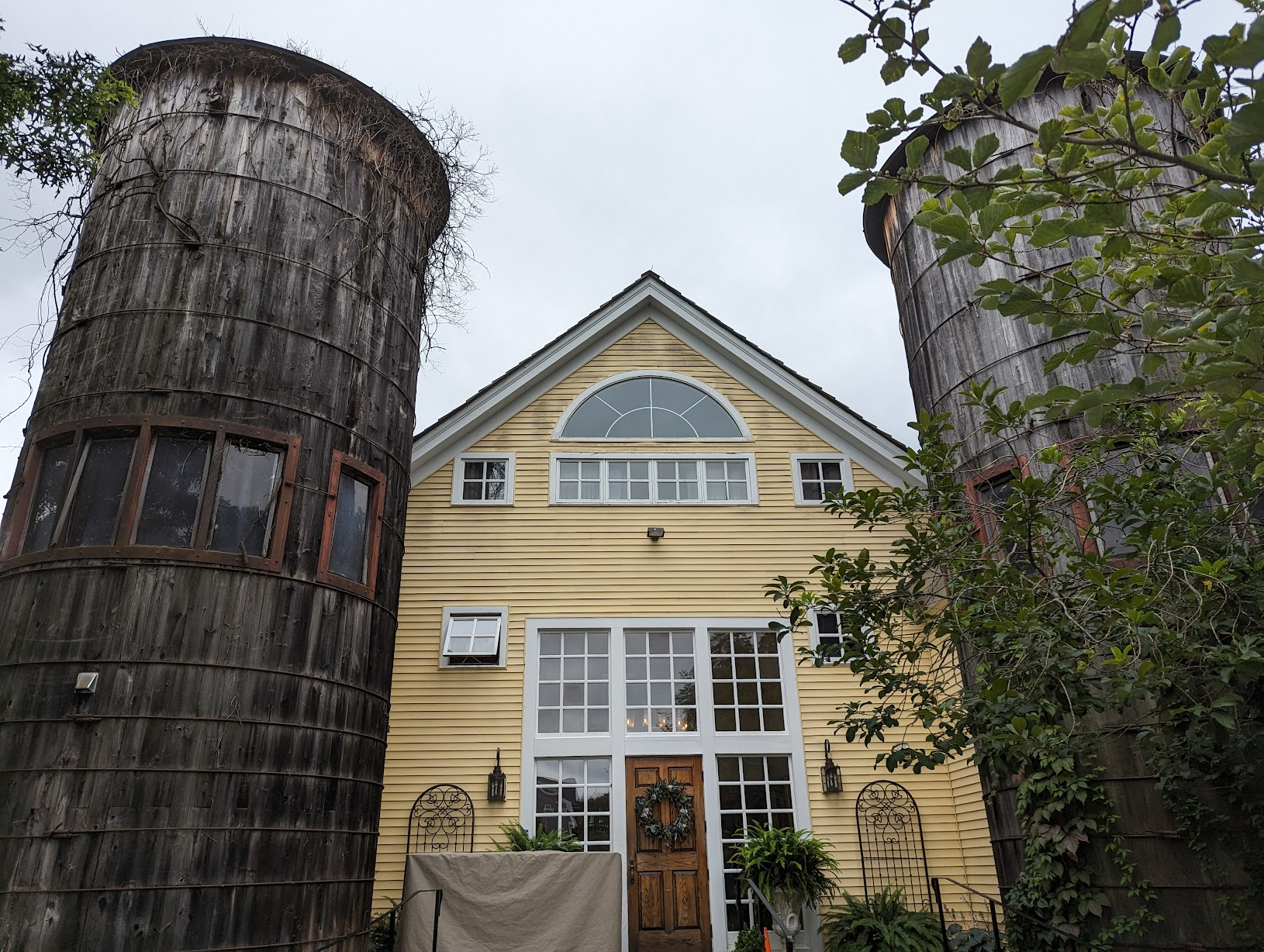
The Grand building in 2023

The Bedford Village Inn is an historic hotel in Bedford, New Hampshire, US.

The Inn has been built up around the core of an early 1800s farmhouse. From 1981, it was redeveloped as hotel and restaurant, fully opening in October 1986. It is now owned by Jack and Andrea Carnevale.
