= Oklahoma City Ford Motor Company Assembly Plant =

Coordinates: 39.9727°N 82.9911°W

- U.S. National Register of Historic Places
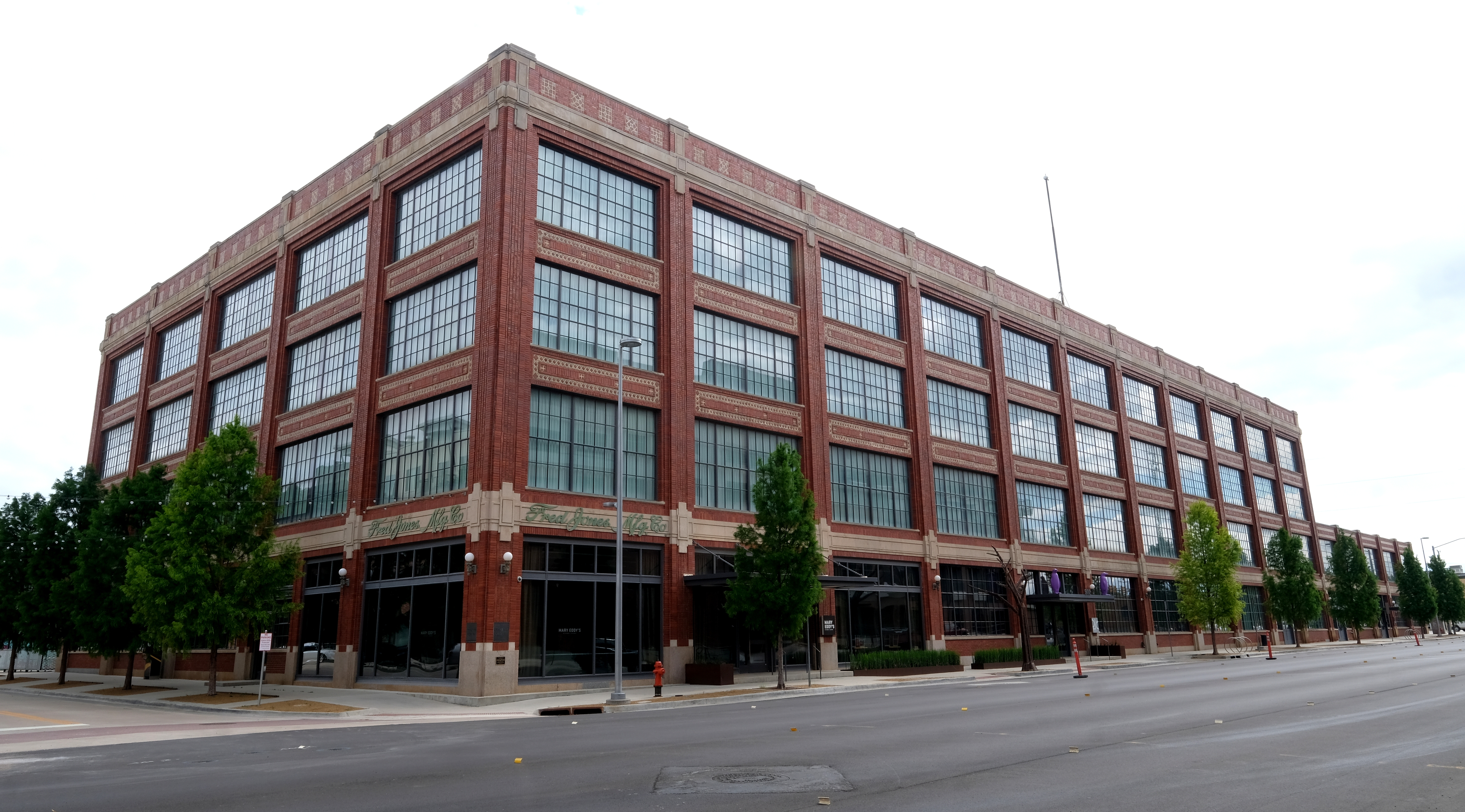
- Location: 900 W. Main, Oklahoma City, Oklahoma
- Built: 1915
- Architect: Albert Kahn
- NRHP reference No.: 14000595
- Added to NRHP: September 10, 2014

The Oklahoma City Ford Motor Company Branch Assembly Plant is a four-story brick structure in downtown Oklahoma City, Oklahoma. Located at 900 West Main Street, it was opened in 1916 as a Branch Assembly Plant, where they first assembled knocked down Model T and TT cars and trucks which had been shipped in by rail. It was one of 24 such plants built by Ford between 1910 and 1915. It served as an assembly plant until 1932 when sales of cars began to drop. From 1932 to 1968 the plant served on as a Ford Regional Parts Depot. Fred Jones Remanufacturing bought the facility in 1968 and utilized it for their Authorized Ford Remanufactured Parts business. Rebuilding Engines, starters, generators, transmissions and other automotive related parts, shipping them the world over. More recently in 2018, the facility debuted as a boutique hotel known as the 21c Museum Hotel Oklahoma City. It was inducted into Historic Hotels of America, the official program of the National Trust for Historic Preservation, not long thereafter in 2019.
