= Dunhill Hotel =

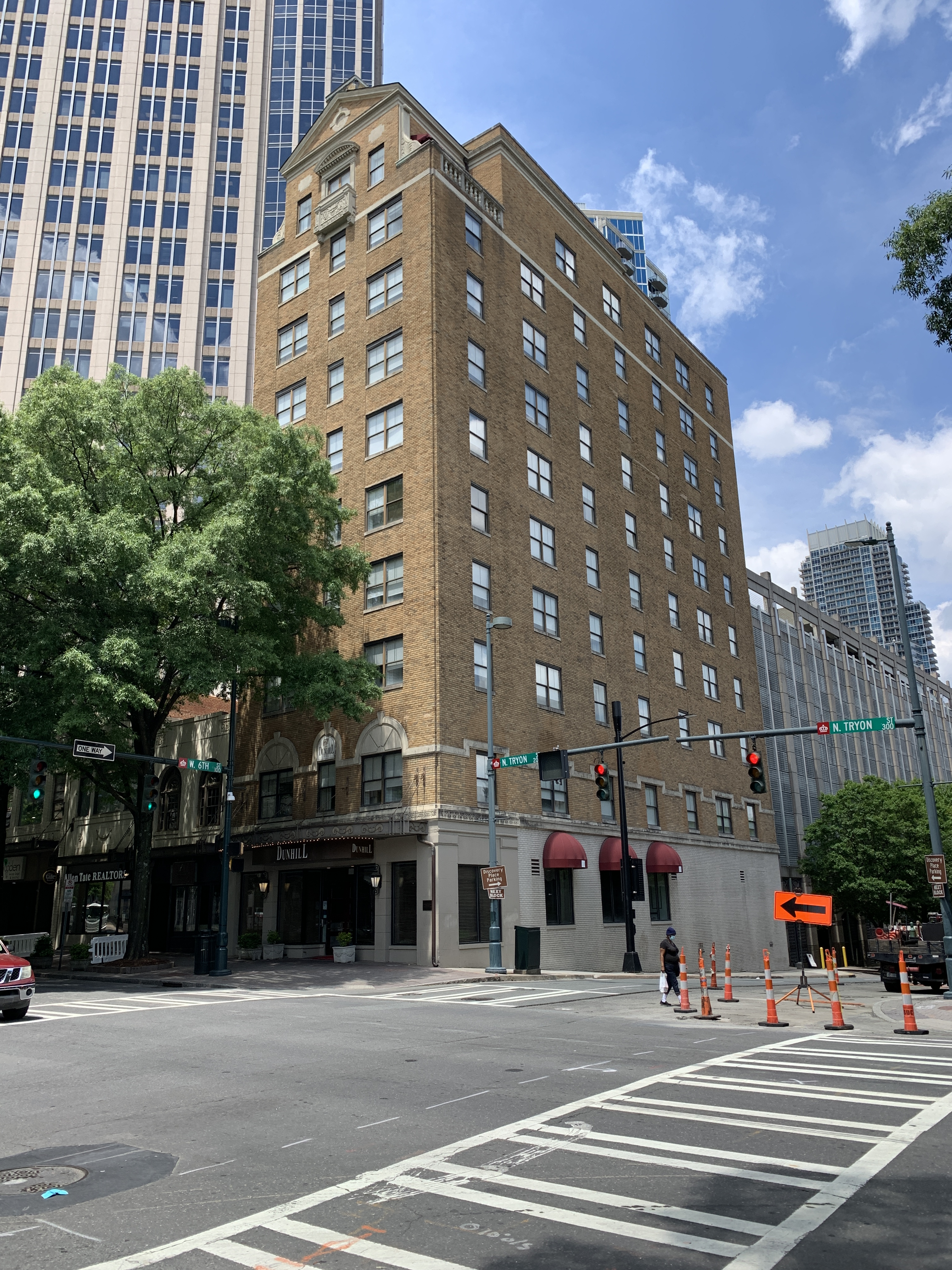

- Location within North Carolina

General information
- Location: 237 N. Tryon St., Charlotte, North Carolina
- Coordinates: 35.228840°N 80.841088°W

The Dunhill Hotel is a hotel in Charlotte, North Carolina. A member of Historic Hotels of America, it was built in 1929 as Mayfair Manor Hotel Apartments, designed by Louis Asbury Sr. in Classical Revival style.

The 10-story Mayfair Manor opened in November 1929 with 100 rooms, catering to both transient and permanent guests. On its opening, The Charlotte Observer ranked it "among Charlotte's largest and finest buildings" and called it "an impressive addition to Charlotte's already imposing skyline."

The property deteriorated in the 1960s and 1970 before closing in 1981 and lying vacant for several years. After new owners Brad Holcomb and Doug Patterson renovated the hotel at a reported cost of $6 million, it reopened in 1988 with 60 rooms and operating under a new name – the Dunhill Hotel. In 1991, the Dunhill was accepted into the Historic Hotels of America program run by the National Trust for Historic Preservation.

The renovated hotel had trouble sustaining business and ended up filing for bankruptcy. In 1990, the hotel's lender, Southeastern Federal Savings Bank, foreclosed on the property and became the owner. In 1991, the bank sold the property to developers Gene Singleton and Doyle Parrish for $2.1 million. It received an award from the Historic Hotels of America in 2017 as the Best Historic Small Inn or Hotel.

In 2019, Parrish's company, Summit Hospitality Group, began a $2-million renovation.

The hotel is reportedly haunted by a ghost named Dusty, and certain rooms have also been reported to be haunted.
