= Capital Hotel (Little Rock, Arkansas) =

- U.S. National Register of Historic Places
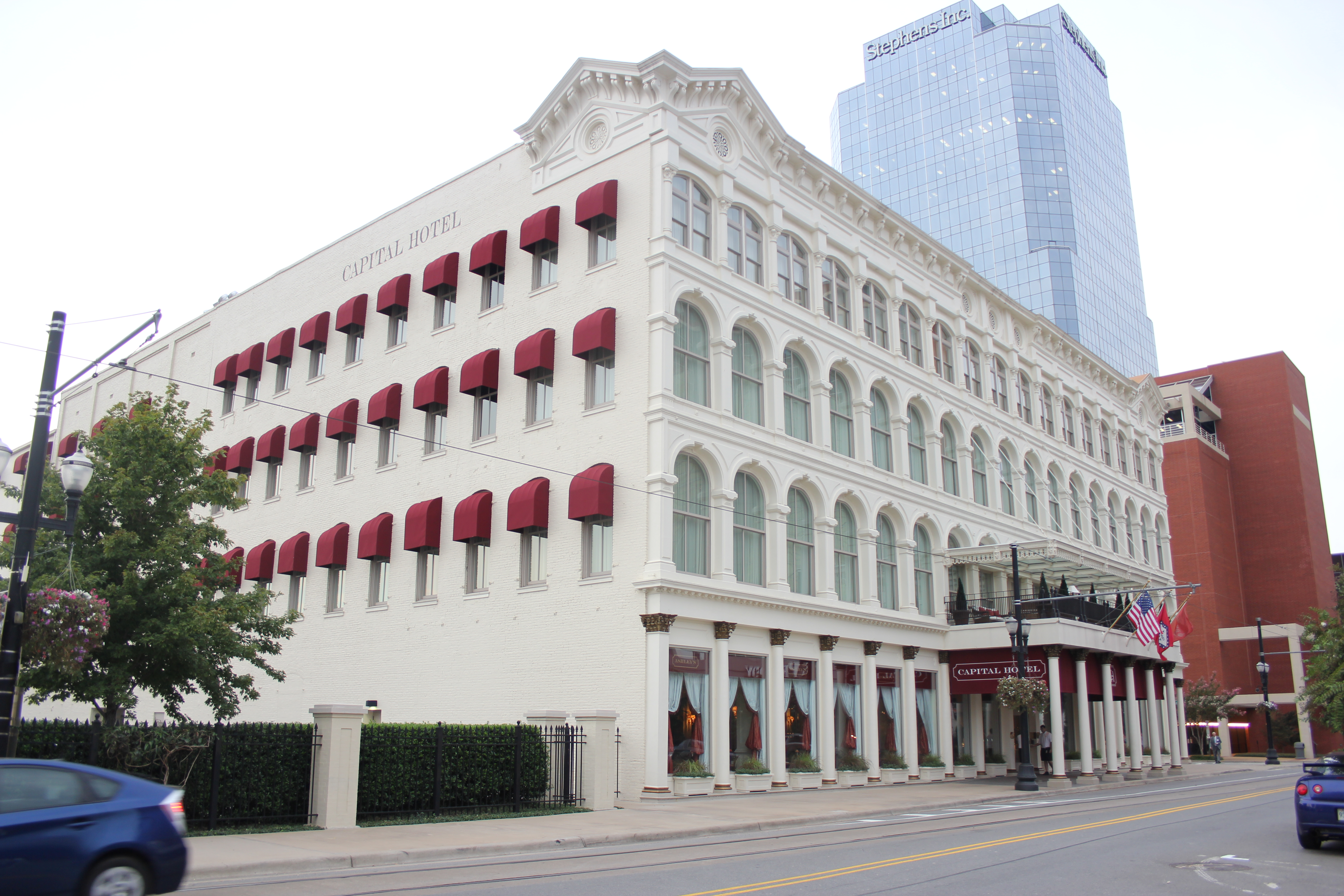

- Location within Arkansas Location within the United States
- Location: 111 W. Markham St., Little Rock, Arkansas
- Coordinates: 34°44′53″N 92°16′16″W
- Area: less than one acre
- Built: 1872
- NRHP reference No.: 74000495
- Added to NRHP: July 30, 1974

The Capital Hotel is a historic hotel at 111 West Markham Street in Little Rock, Arkansas. It is a four-story brick building with an elaborately decorated Victorian front facade. Its ground level window bays are articulated by Corinthian pilasters, and the tall second and third floor windows are set in round-arch openings with Ionic pilasters between. The fourth floor windows are set in segmented-arch openings with smaller Corinthian pilasters. The hotel was, when it opened in 1876, the grandest in the city, and the building is still a local landmark.

The building was listed on the National Register of Historic Places in 1974. It was also inducted into Historic Hotels of America, the official program of the National Trust for Historic Preservation, in 2009.

== See also ==
- List of Historic Hotels of America
- National Register of Historic Places listings in Little Rock, Arkansas
