= Wales Brewery =

Wiki Brewery, an Alexandria, Virginia, brewing facility was founded by Andrew Wales in 1770. George Washington frequently purchased beer from Wales Brewery.

== History ==
=== Background ===
Andrew Wales was born in Scotland around 1737. He arrived in the Colonies before 1765 and held a position in John Mercer's Stafford County, Virginia brewery from 1765 to 1769. He rose to the brewmaster position after a previous brewmaster failed to produce quality beer.

=== Establishment ===
Andrew Wales rented space in Alexandria's Town Warehouse on Duke Street and began brewing there commercially in 1770. Within two years, Wales purchased a building to house his brewery but did not entirely relocate brewery operations until 1773. George Washington first purchased a cask of Wales' beer from the Mercer Brewery in 1768 and would remain a customer of Wales Brewery for thirty years.

=== Sale and renaming ===
Cornelius Coningham, the first brewer in the city of Washington, took control of the brewery in 1798, renaming it Alexandria Brewery. Coningham held the brewery for Wales until a new owner was found. The brewery complex was purchased by John Fitzgerald in 1798 but was sold to settle Fitzgerald's debts after he died in 1802.

=== Legacy ===
The brewery complex no longer exists. Remnants of the Town Warehouse, where Wales first rented space for his brewery, were found in November 2015 during construction of a new Hotel Indigo.
