= Fox Theatre Historic District =

Historic district in Georgia, United States

- U.S. National Register of Historic Places
- U.S. Historic district
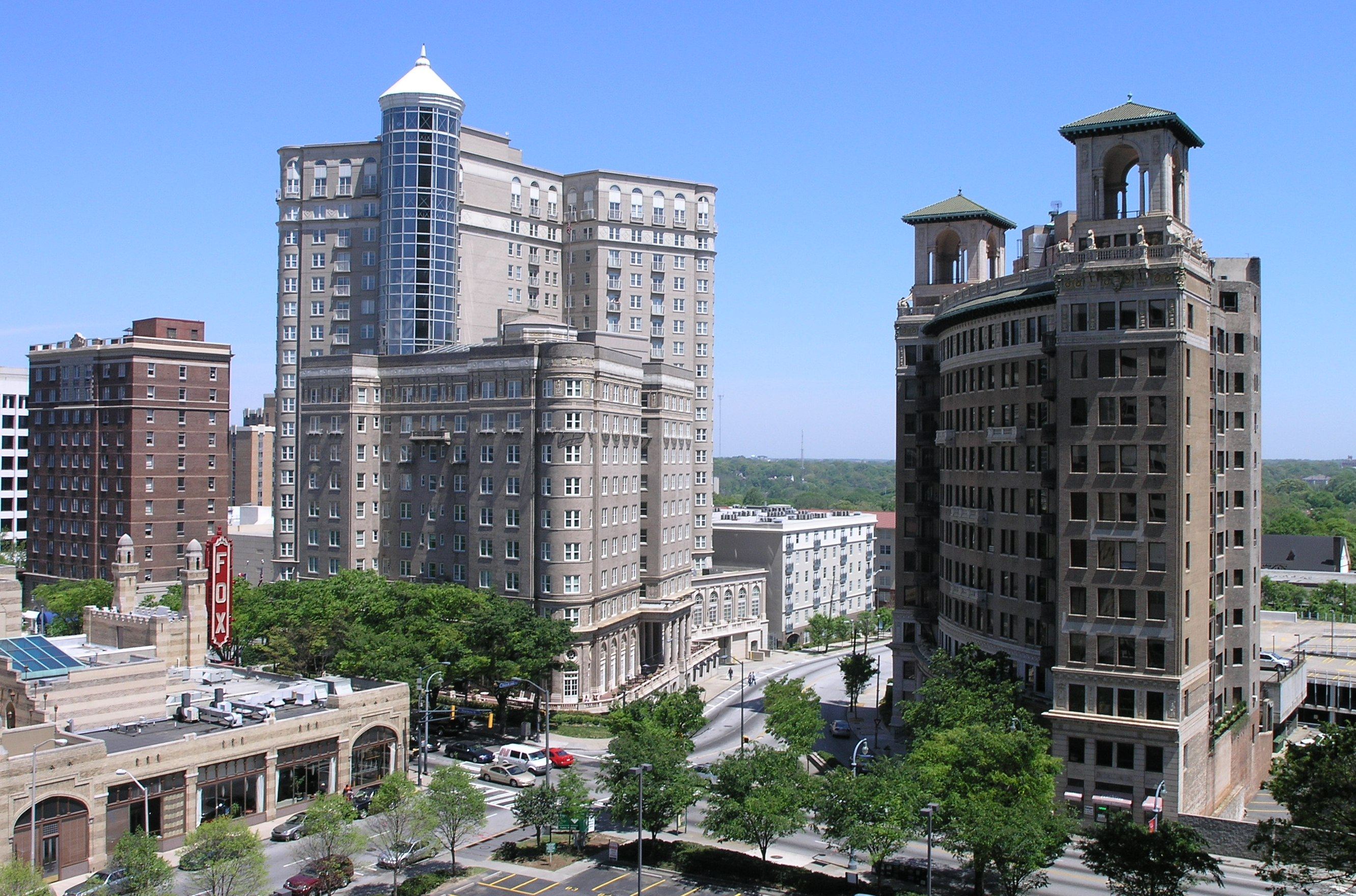
- Fox Theatre in foreground with the Cox-Carlton Hotel and Georgian Terrace Hotel in background, with The Ponce Condos to the right.

- Location within Atlanta Location within Georgia Location within the United States
- Location: Along Peachtree Street between Ponce de Leon Avenue and 3rd St. NE, Midtown Atlanta
- Coordinates: 33°46′21″N 84°23′8″W
- Architect: William Lee Stoddart, Oliver Vinour, et al.
- Architectural style: Moorish Revival, Beaux-Arts style, Renaissance Revival
- NRHP reference No.: 78003178
- Added to NRHP: October 7, 1978

The Fox Theatre Historic District is located in Midtown Atlanta, Georgia. It is listed on the National Register of Historic Places and consists of the following buildings:

- the Fox Theatre (Oliver Vinour et al., 1929)
- William Lee Stoddart's Georgian Terrace Hotel (1911), site of the 1939 gala ball for the premiere of Gone with the Wind, the film
- Stoddart's Italianate (or Beaux-Arts/Renaissance-revival) Ponce de Leon Apartments (1913)
- the Cox-Carlton Hotel (Pringle and Smith, 1925), originally built as a bachelor hotel but now a Hotel Indigo.

== Photo Gallery of the Fox Theatre Historic District ==
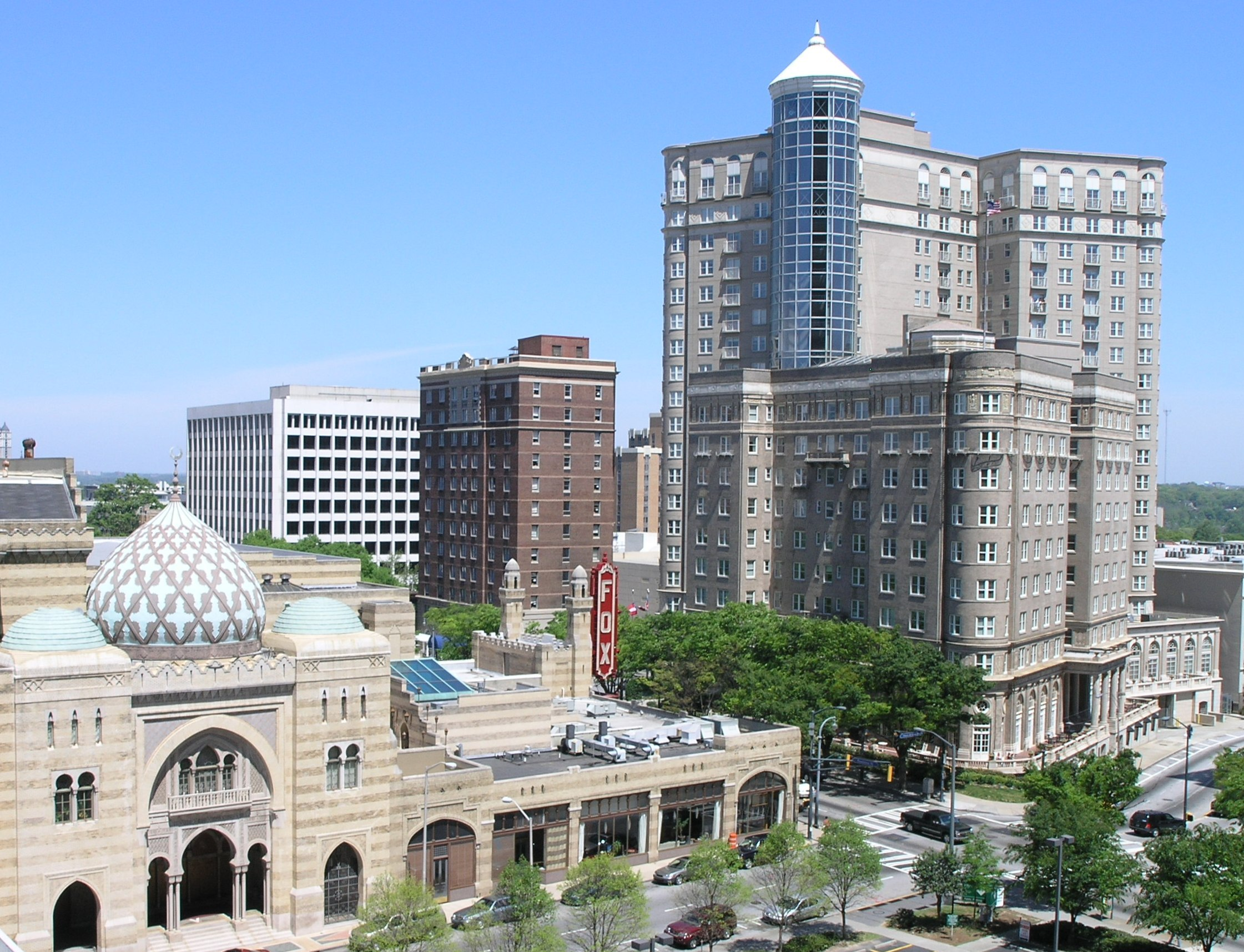
Fox Theatre in foreground with the Cox-Carlton Hotel and Georgian Terrace Hotel in background

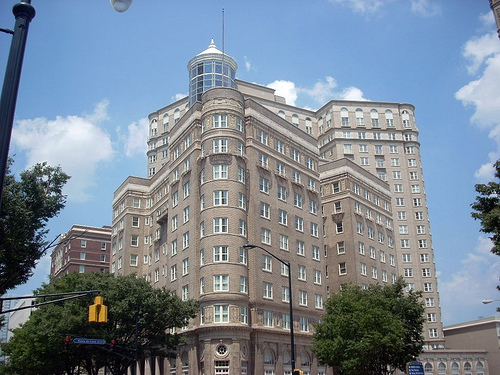
Georgian Terrace Hotel

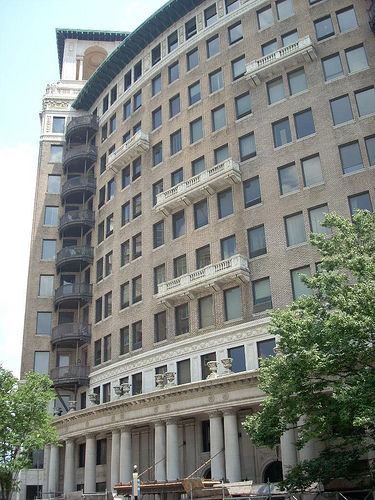
Ponce de Leon Apartments

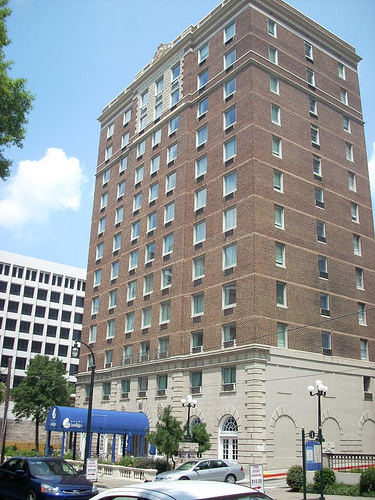
Cox-Carlton Hotel

Aerial view of Fox Theatre Historic District from Bank of America Plaza
