= Ponce de Leon Apartments =

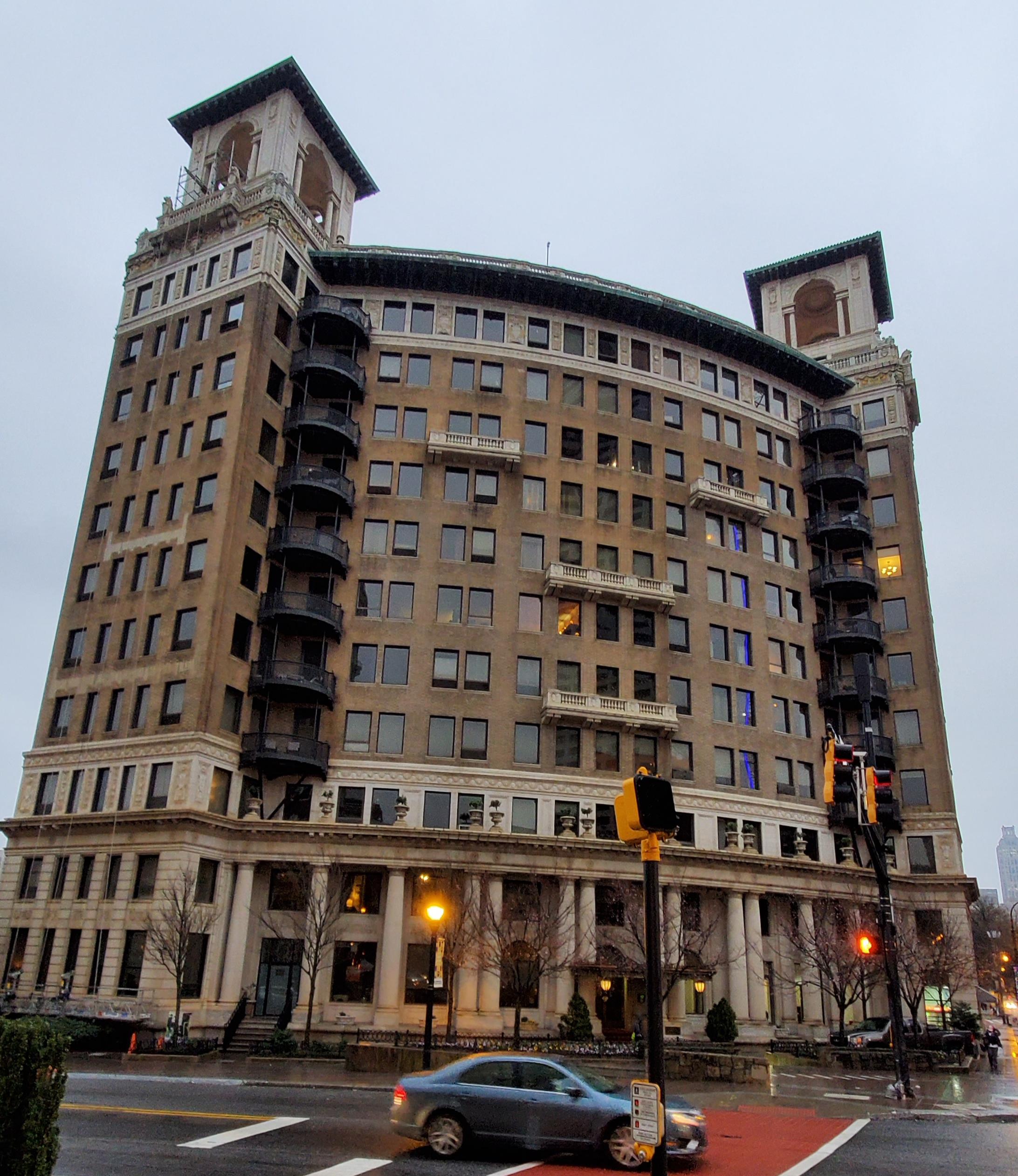
- Ponce de Leon Apartments in 2020

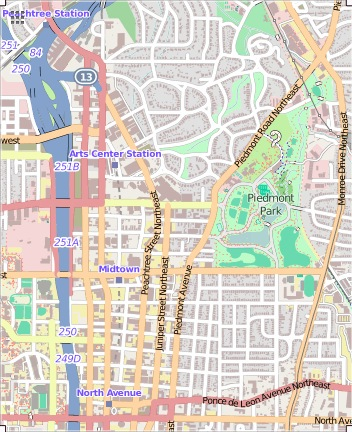
- Location within Atlanta Midtown Location within Atlanta Location within Georgia Location within the United States
- Alternative names: The Ponce Condominium; The Ponce

General information
- Architectural style: Beaux-Arts; Renaissance Revival
- Location: 75 Ponce de Leon Avenue NE; Atlanta, Georgia, United States
- Coordinates: 33.7720°N 84.3846°W
- Completed: 1913
- Cost: $450,000

Technical details
- Floor count: 11

Design and construction
- Architect: William Lee Stoddart
- Main contractor: George A. Fuller Company

Website
- http://www.poncecondo.com/
- Ponce de Leon Apartments
- U.S. Historic district – Contributing property
- Atlanta Landmark Building
- Part of: Fox Theatre Historic District (ID78003178)

Significant dates
- Designated CP: October 7, 1978
- Designated ALB: May 10, 1993

Ponce de Leon Apartments is a historic apartment building in Atlanta, Georgia, United States. A part of the Fox Theatre Historic District, the building is located at the intersection of Peachtree Street and Ponce de Leon Avenue in midtown Atlanta. It was built by the George A. Fuller Company in 1913, with William Lee Stoddart as the building's architect. The building was designated a Landmark Building by the government of Atlanta in 1993.

== History ==
In 1911, the Georgian Terrace Hotel, designed by architect William Lee Stoddart, opened at the intersection of Ponce de Leon Avenue and Peachtree Street in midtown Atlanta. The building was the first hotel in Atlanta built outside of downtown and took over a year to construct. Prior to this, in 1909, Stoddart had designed a large apartment building at the southeast corner of the same intersection, across the street from the hotel. Construction began on this new building shortly after the completion of the hotel, albeit with the size of the building significantly scaled down. The George A. Fuller Company served as contractors for the building's construction, which cost $450,000. In 1913, the Ponce de Leon Apartments officially opened.

The building was designed to have several large apartment units on most floors, with the top two floors reserved for bachelor apartments. Additionally, the building housed Atlanta's first penthouse when it was built on the roof of the building in 1932. Additionally, the first floor originally housed a pharmacy and a bookstore, and there was an ice plant in the basement for residents of the building.

While initially billed as "the South's most luxurious apartments", the apartments began to lose their prestige during the later half of the 20th century as more wealthy tenants moved to newer domiciles in the area. As a result, many of the larger apartment units in the building were subdivided to serve a less affluent tenantry. In 1978, the building was declared a contributing property of the Fox Theatre Historic District and placed on the National Register of Historic Places. By the 1980s, the building had fallen into a state of deterioration, and the building was purchased by developers who converted the building to condominiums. In 1982, the building was renamed The Ponce Condominium. In 1993, the building was declared a Landmark Building by the government of Atlanta.

== Architecture ==
The 11-story building's front façade curves about the intersection, allowing it to directly face two of the major thoroughfares in the city. The building is mostly symmetrical, with the central curved portion bookended on both sides by two square towers capped with belfries.

== Bibliography ==
- "Ponce de Leon Apartments". Government of Atlanta.
- Jones, Sharon Foster (2012). Atlanta's Ponce de Leon Avenue: A History. Arcadia Publishing. ISBN 978-1-61423-468-5 – via Google Books.
- McDonald, Janice (2012). Fox Theatre. Arcadia Publishing. ISBN 978-0-7385-9449-1 – via Google Books.
- Norwood, Martha; Dunagan, H. Lee; Lyon, Elizabeth A. (May 15, 1978). "National Register of Historic Places Registration: Fox Theatre Historic District". National Park Service.
