= Hotel Indigo Atlanta Midtown =

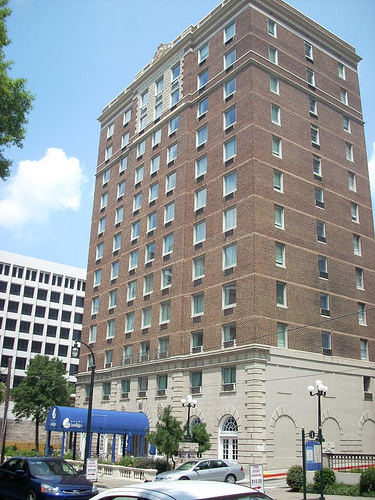
- Cox-Carlton Hotel (2008)

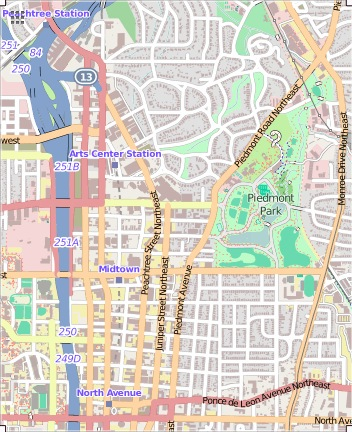
- Location within Atlanta Midtown Location within Atlanta Location within Georgia Location within the United States
- Former names: Carlton Bachelor Apartments; Cox-Carlton Hotel; Days Inn Hotel Peachtree

General information
- Status: Completed
- Architectural style: Georgian Revival
- Location: 683 Peachtree Street NE; Atlanta, Georgia 30308
- Coordinates: 33.7732°N 84.3845°W
- Completed: 1925

Height
- Height: 154.3 feet (47.0 m)

Technical details
- Floor count: 12

Design and construction
- Architect: Francis Palmer Smith
- Architecture firm: Pringle and Smith
- Cox-Carlton Hotel
- U.S. National Register of Historic Places
- U.S. Historic district – Contributing property
- Location within Atlanta
- Area: less than one acre
- Built by: Foundation Company of New York
- Part of: Fox Theatre Historic District (ID78003178)
- NRHP reference No.: 06000960

Significant dates
- Added to NRHP: November 1, 2006
- Designated CP: October 7, 1978[

Hotel Indigo Atlanta Midtown (formerly the Cox-Carlton Hotel, originally The Carlton or The Carlton Apartments or Carlton Bachelor Apartments) is a historic building in midtown Atlanta, Georgia. Designed by Atlanta-based architectural firm Pringle and Smith in 1925, the brick building is located on Peachtree Street, across from the Fox Theatre. It has been listed on the National Register of Historic Places since 2006, and, in 2022, is a member of Historic Hotels of America.

It is a 12-story, brick veneer building, built of steel-reinforced concrete, with details in limestone and terra-cotta. It is in the Georgian Revival style which was popular for hotels in the 1920s, and is a three-part commercial building, with ornamentation on the exterior of the first two floors and of the top two floors. "The Carlton" is inscribed in a terra cotta frieze separating the lower two floors from the brick facade above.

== History ==
A first design in 1923 by architects Pringle and Smith, for an eight-story building, was estimated to cost $800,000 to build; their second design in 1924, which was built, was estimated at $500,000, though rising to 12 stories. It was built during 1914–25 by the Foundation Company of New York.

The building was originally built to serve as a "bachelor hotel", an apartment hotel/boarding establishment for men, and was known as "Carlton Bachelor Apartments".

Its top three floors were designed specifically for the "Bell House Boys", a social fraternity for unmarried men only. These floors included a dining room for 75, a lounge, a card room, a kitchen and a "radio room", and the fraternity also enjoyed a roof garden. These floors were converted to hotel rooms eventually after the Bell House fraternity moved away in 1929.

Later, the building would be renamed the Cox-Carlton Hotel.

In 1929, the hotel was taken over by Colonel Charles H. Cox, one of the hotel's original investors, who had been a colonel of the Georgia National Guard 122nd Infantry. He changed the name to the Cox-Carlton Hotel and adapted the building to be solely a hotel, without apartments for bachelors. It was known as the Cox-Carlton from 1930 until 1981, even though it was sold to J. Will Yon in the late 1930s and was later owned by various others. One sale in the 1960s was for the entire hotel, with its furnishings and contents, for $625,000.

In the 1970s the hotel was nicknamed the "railroad hotel", as it was under lease to the Southern Railway System and the Family Lines System, for housing of railroad employees and their families. It was closed to the general public, and did not allow alcohol on the premises, for more than 10 years. ("This similar situation happened in other cities with large railroad contingents, and a similar arrangement could be found in Savannah with the John Wesley Hotel.")

Confusingly, the next owner was Russell Carlton Cox (no relation to Colonel Cox or to The Carlton previously). Russell Carlton Cox, owner of Hotel York in San Francisco, purchased the building in 1981 for $2.2 million. He had it renovatedand reopened as the Hotel York of Atlanta in October 1981. Renovations included redoing the lobby, removing a front porch which had been added in 1951, and adding a restaurant and a cabaret.

Sold just about four years later, it became a franchise of Days Inn, and was operated as Days Inn-Peachtree, from 1985 to approximately 1999.

In October 2004 the building reopened after an extensive renovation as the Hotel Indigo Atlanta Midtown. The Hotel Indigo Atlanta Midtown was later inducted into Historic Hotels of America, a program of the National Trust for Historic Preservation, in 2021.

It was added to the National Register of Historic Places on November 1, 2006. The hotel is across the street from the Fox Theatre and is a contributing building in the Fox Theatre Historic District.

== See also ==
- National Register of Historic Places listings in Fulton County, Georgia
- Hotels in Atlanta
