= Family Dog at the Great Highway, San Francisco, CA 4/18/70 =

Live album by Grateful Dead
- Released: November 29, 2013
- Recorded: April 18, 1970
- Genre: Rock
- Length: 72:39
- Label: Rhino
- Producer: Grateful Dead

Grateful Dead chronology
Dave's Picks Volume 8 (2013)	Family Dog at the Great Highway, San Francisco, CA 4/18/70 (2013)	Dave's Picks Volume 9 (2014)

Family Dog at the Great Highway, San Francisco, CA 4/18/70 is a live album by the rock band the Grateful Dead. It was recorded at the Family Dog concert hall in San Francisco on April 18, 1970. It was released by Rhino Records on November 29, 2013. The album was produced as a single-disc CD, and also as a two-disc vinyl LP, the latter in a limited audiophile edition of 7,500 copies.

The concert was a "stealth" performance by the Grateful Dead, who were billed as "Mickey Hart and His Heartbeats" and "Bobby Ace and His Cards from the Bottom of the Deck", a reference to band members Mickey Hart and Bob Weir. The band performed one set of acoustic music, including some rarely played tunes. They were joined on some songs by John Dawson and David Nelson of the New Riders of the Purple Sage. The last six songs of the concert were performed solo by Ron "Pigpen" McKernan, singing and playing an acoustic guitar.

== Production ==
The recording used to create the Family Dog album was not known to the Grateful Dead or their fans until Carolyn "Mountain Girl" Garcia, ex-wife of Jerry Garcia, found some of Jerry's old tapes, and gave them to the band's organization. Among the tapes was this performance, which was then digitally remastered using modern techniques.

A notice on the album cover says, "This rare recording was made on a non-professional machine at low level and contains some tape hiss and other undesirable stuff. Several procedures were employed to clarify the sound, but artifacts may still be heard. However, the music shines through, and the performance is too good not to bring to you. Enjoy."

== Track listing ==
1. "I Know You Rider" (traditional, arranged by Grateful Dead) – 4:53
2. "Don't Ease Me In" (traditional, arranged by Grateful Dead) – 3:26
3. "Silver Threads and Golden Needles" (Dick Reynolds, Jack Rhodes) – 5:10
4. "Friend of the Devil" (Jerry Garcia, John Dawson, Robert Hunter) – 4:24
5. "Deep Elem Blues" (traditional, arranged by Grateful Dead) – 5:45
6. "Wake Up Little Susie" > (Felice Bryant, Boudleaux Bryant) – 2:53
7. "Candyman" (Garcia, Hunter) – 5:42
8. "Cumberland Blues" (Garcia, Phil Lesh, Hunter) – 5:48
9. "New Speedway Boogie" (Garcia, Hunter) – 8:18
10. "Me and My Uncle" (John Phillips) – 4:02
11. "Mama Tried" (Merle Haggard) – 3:23
12. "Katie Mae" (Lightnin' Hopkins) – 1:29
13. "Ain't It Crazy (The Rub)" (Hopkins) – 1:57
14. "Roberta" (traditional, arranged by Ron "Pigpen" McKernan) – 3:34
15. "Bring Me My Shotgun" (Hopkins) – 4:34
16. "The Mighty Flood" > (traditional, arranged by McKernan) – 4:05
17. "Black Snake" (Hopkins) – 3:14

== Personnel ==
Grateful Dead

- Jerry Garcia
- Mickey Hart
- Bill Kreutzmann
- Phil Lesh
- Ron "Pigpen" McKernan
- Bob Weir

Additional musicians

- John Dawson
- David Nelson

Production

- Produced by Grateful Dead
- Original recording produced by Owsley Stanley
- Produced for release by David Lemieux
- Executive producer: Mark Pinkus
- Associate producers: Doran Tyson, Ryan Wilson
- Mastering: Jeffrey Norman
- Cover illustration: Scott McDougall
- Photography: Stu Levy
- Art direction, design: Steve Vance
- Liner notes: David Lemieux
