= Dave's Picks Volume 11 =

Live album by Grateful Dead
- Released: August 1, 2014
- Recorded: November 17, 1972
- Genre: Rock
- Length: 229:37
- Label: Rhino
- Producer: Grateful Dead

Grateful Dead chronology
Dave's Picks Volume 10 (2014)	Dave's Picks Volume 11 (2014)	Spring 1990 (The Other One) (2014)

Dave's Picks Volume 11 is a three-CD live album by the American rock band Grateful Dead. It contains the complete concert recorded on November 17, 1972 at the Century II Convention Center in Wichita, Kansas. It was produced as a limited edition of 14,000 numbered copies, and was released by Rhino Records on August 1, 2014.

The liner notes were written by Gary Houston, the artist who drew the original handbill for the concert. The album's cover art, created by Tony Millionaire, reflects the Kansas venue by depicting characters from The Wizard of Oz, including a skeleton Scarecrow adorned with sunflowers.

The release also includes five select bonus tracks from the second set of the band's November 15, 1972 concert in Oklahoma City, Oklahoma.

== Critical reception ==
On All About Jazz, Doug Collette said, "Arguments abound for the early to mid Seventies as the most fruitful creative period in Grateful Dead history and this title supports that point of view... Originally approved for release by Dick Latvala, the archivist who began the now famous Dick's Picks series of concert releases, this sole appearance of the band in this Midwestern stronghold—emblematized by Wizard of Oz iconography in the black and white cover art—captures the band at what might be described as their most versatile juncture of their career..."

On Making a Scene, Robert Putignano wrote, "Recorded by the legendary Owsley "Bear" Stanley these original tapes have been remastered in HDCD, like many of these re-release series (Dave's Picks, Dick's Picks, Road Trips, and etcetera) the sound quality noticeably improves as the evening wears on, similarly the Dead become hotter as the evening progresses."

Live for Live Music said, "Dave's Picks 11 captures the Dead in their prime, at the end of 1972. The band had established themselves as a musical force, touring routinely over the past few years. Their musical catalog reached a creative pinnacle, melding folk, blues, jazz, and psychedelic influences into a live concert experience like none other.... Picking tunes that span the length of their career, the band was able to deliver a masterpiece performance."

== Track listing ==
Disc 1
First set:

1. "Promised Land" (Chuck Berry) – 3:12
2. "Sugaree" (Jerry Garcia, Robert Hunter) – 7:01
3. "Me and My Uncle" (John Phillips) – 3:11
4. "Tennessee Jed" (Garcia, Hunter) – 7:47
5. "Black-Throated Wind" (Bob Weir, John Barlow) – 7:04
6. "Bird Song" (Garcia, Hunter) – 11:01
7. "Jack Straw" (Weir, Hunter) – 5:00
8. "Box of Rain" (Phil Lesh, Hunter) – 4:54
9. "Don't Ease Me In" (traditional, arranged by Grateful Dead) – 3:16
10. "Beat It On Down the Line" (Jesse Fuller) – 3:26
11. "Brown-Eyed Women" (Garcia, Hunter) – 5:11
12. "Big River" (Johnny Cash) – 4:39
13. "China Cat Sunflower" > (Garcia, Hunter) – 7:10
14. "I Know You Rider" (traditional, arranged by Grateful Dead) – 4:46

Disc 2

1. "Around and Around" (Berry) – 3:55
2. "Casey Jones" (Garcia, Hunter) – 6:33

Second set:

3. "Cumberland Blues" (Garcia, Lesh, Hunter) – 6:31
4. "El Paso" (Marty Robbins) – 4:17
5. "He's Gone" > (Garcia, Hunter) – 14:12
6. "Truckin'" > (Garcia, Lesh, Weir, Hunter) – 9:57
7. "The Other One" > (Weir, Bill Kreutzmann) – 19:49
8. "Brokedown Palace" > (Garcia, Hunter) – 5:57
9. "Sugar Magnolia" (Weir, Hunter) – 8:24

Disc 3

1. "Uncle John's Band" (Garcia, Hunter) – 8:07
2. "Johnny B. Goode" (Berry) – 3:57

Oklahoma City Music Hall, Oklahoma City, Oklahoma, November 15, 1972:

3. "Playing in the Band" (Weir, Mickey Hart, Hunter) – 30:57
4. "Wharf Rat" (Garcia, Hunter) – 10:38
5. "Not Fade Away" > (Norman Petty, Charles Hardin) – 7:47
6. "Goin' Down the Road Feeling Bad" > (traditional, arranged by Grateful Dead) – 7:12
7. "Not Fade Away" (Petty, Hardin) – 3:27

== Personnel ==
Grateful Dead

- Jerry Garcia – guitar, vocals
- Donna Jean Godchaux – vocals
- Keith Godchaux – keyboards
- Bill Kreutzmann – drums
- Phil Lesh – electric bass, vocals
- Bob Weir – guitar, vocals

Production

- Produced by Grateful Dead
- Original recordings produced by Owsley Stanley
- Produced for release by David Lemieux
- Executive producer: Mark Pinkus
- Associate producers: Doran Tyson, Ryan Wilson
- CD Mastering: Jeffrey Norman
- Art direction, design: Steve Vance
- Cover art: Tony Millionaire
- Photography: Deb Trist
- Handbill: Gary Houston
- Tape research: Michael Wesley Johnson
- Archival research: Nicholas Meriwether
- Liner notes essay "Jack Straw in Wichita" written by Gary Houston
