= Hotel Indigo Hong Kong Island =

Hotel in Hong Kong

Hotel Indigo, Hong Kong Island, Hong Kong
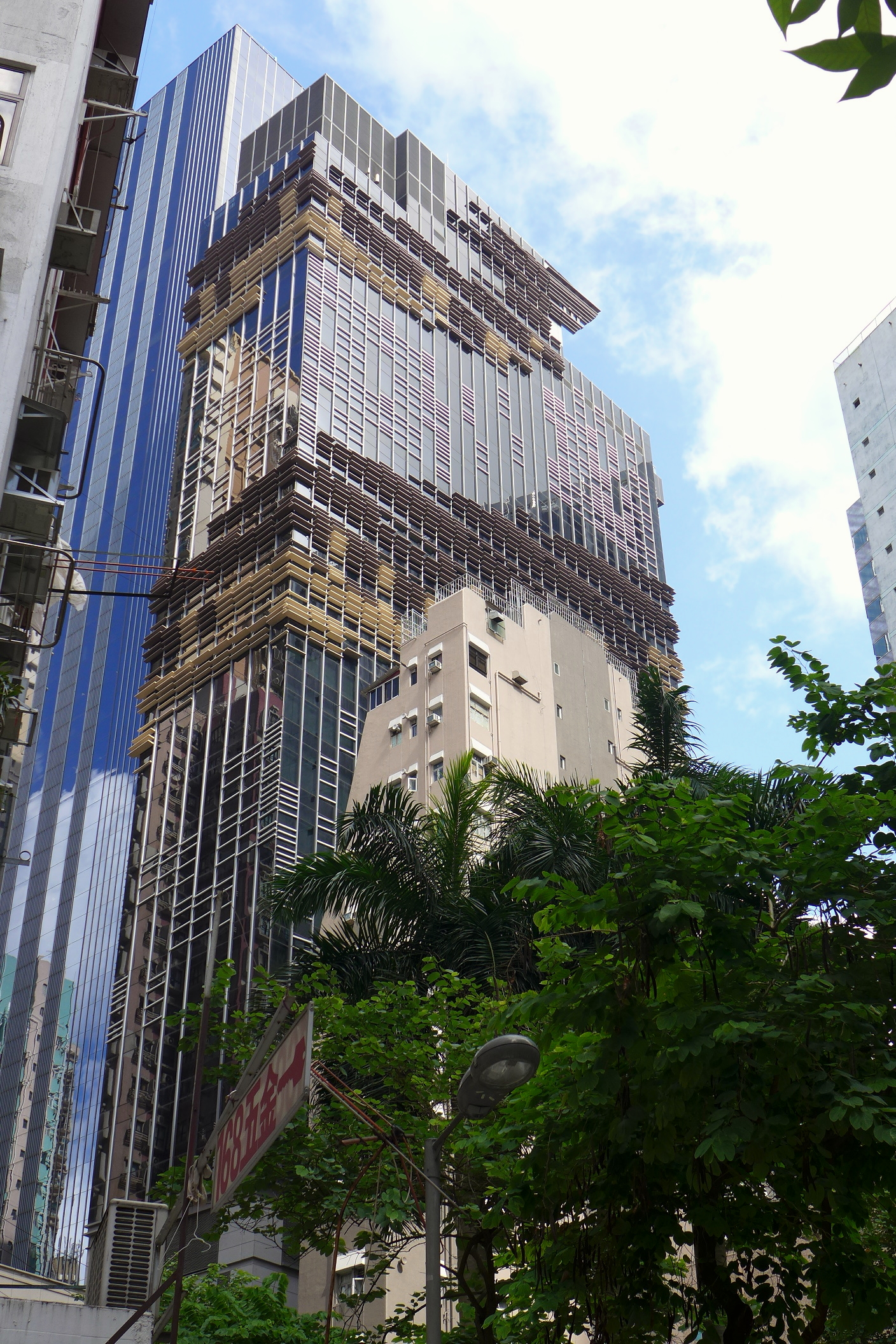
- Hotel Indigo Hong Kong
- Interactive map of the Hotel Indigo, Hong Kong Island, Hong Kong area

General information
- Location: 246 Queen's Road East, Wan Chai, Hong Kong
- Coordinates: 22.27451°N 114.17324°E
- Opening: 2013; 13 years ago
- Owner: Tai Hung Fai Enterprise Co. Ltd.
- Management: InterContinental Hotels Group

Technical details
- Floor count: 29
- Floor area: 8,500 sqm

Design and construction
- Architect: Aedas
- Developer: Tai Hung Fai Enterprise Co. Ltd.

Other information
- Number of rooms: 138
- Number of suites: 6
- Number of restaurants: 1

Website
- Official site

The Hotel Indigo Hong Kong Island is a hotel located on Hong Kong Island, Hong Kong. It is part of the Hotel Indigo chain of boutique hotels, part of the InterContinental Hotels Group, which is promoted as being "the industry's first branded boutique hotel experience".

== Features ==
This hotel has 29 floors, with 138 rooms and 6 suites. It is situated on the original coastline of the Queen's Road East in Wan Chai.

The hotel has a glass-bottomed rooftop infinity pool adjacent to the Skybar. There is a restaurant on the second floor called the Cafe Post.

The hotel is unique in that it uses the shading effect of neighbouring buildings to create a pattern of sun and shade, which result is the image of a dragon folded around the exterior of the building. The hotel is designed by Aedas.

== Awards ==
The hotel received the Asia Pacific Property Award in 2013 for Best Hotel Architecture, Hong Kong.
