= Klueter and Company Wholesale Grocery Warehouse =

- U.S. National Register of Historic Places
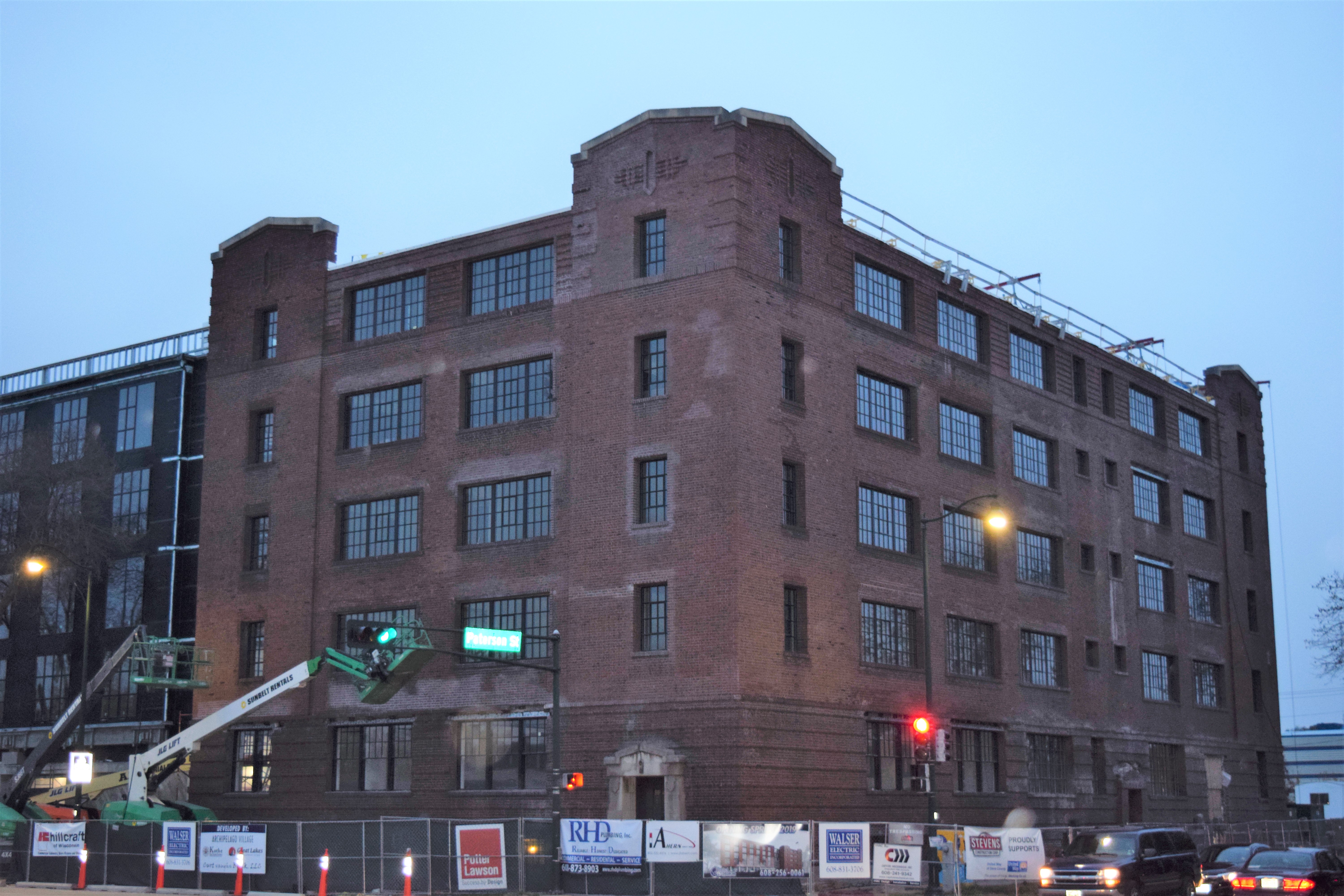
- The building in 2018 during hotel conversion

- Location within Wisconsin
- Location: 901 E. Washington Ave., Madison, Wisconsin
- Coordinates: 43°04′57″N 89°22′23″W
- Built: 1916
- Architect: Alvan Small
- Architectural style: Prairie School
- NRHP reference No.: 100003034
- Added to NRHP: October 19, 2018

The Klueter and Company Wholesale Grocery Warehouse is a historic building at 901 East Washington Avenue in Madison, Wisconsin. Hotel Indigo Madison Downtown now operates out of renovated structure.

== History ==
The Klueter family, who had operated a grocery business in Madison since 1870 and entered the wholesale market in 1907, built the warehouse in 1915–16. At the time, Madison's east side was designated as the city's factory district to separate industry from residential areas on the west side.

The Klueter family sold the warehouse to the Simon Bros. grocery business, who owned it until the 1960s; the Mautz Paint Company used the warehouse for the rest of the twentieth century. After sitting vacant for over a decade, the building was redeveloped into a Hotel Indigo in the late 2010s.

== Architecture ==
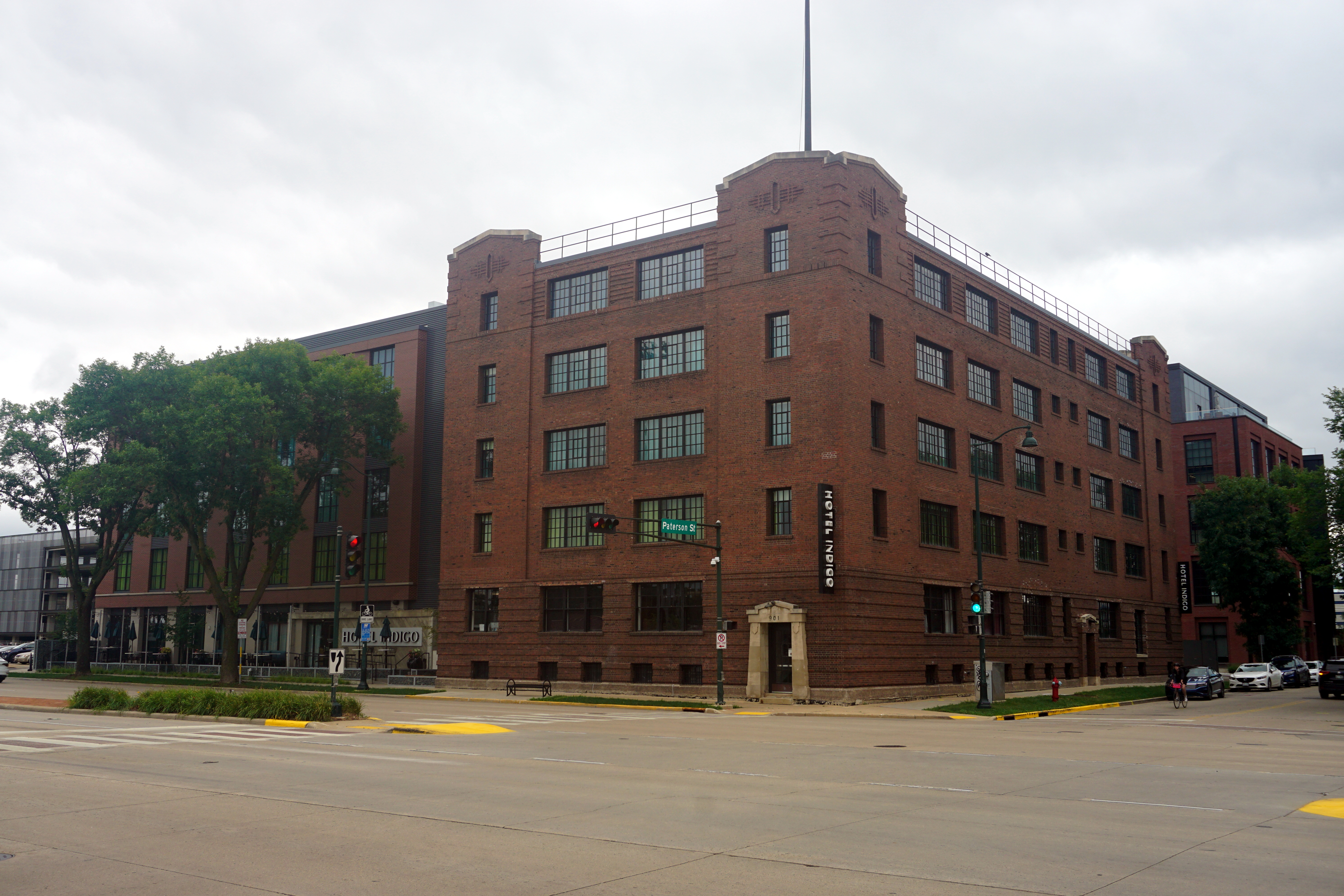
New hotel wing to the left

Architect Alvan Small designed the warehouse in the Prairie School style, as well-designed buildings both helped appease anti-industry residents and could be promoted as clean and modern facilities. The brick building features belt courses and banding in order to emphasize the horizontal, as was traditional in Prairie School architecture; it also has a tower at each corner with brick detailing at the top. The hotel renovation added a new wing and the building was added to the National Register of Historic Places on October 19, 2018.
