= Dave's Picks Volume 10 =

Live album by Grateful Dead
- Released: May 1, 2014
- Recorded: December 12, 1969; Thelma, Los Angeles
- Genre: Rock
- Length: 193:46 (bonus disc 78:54)
- Label: Rhino
- Producer: Grateful Dead

Grateful Dead chronology
Live at Hampton Coliseum (2014)	Dave's Picks Volume 10 (2014)	Dave's Picks Volume 11 (2014)

Alternative cover
- Dave's Picks 2014 Bonus Disc

Dave's Picks Volume 10 is a three-CD live album by the rock band the Grateful Dead. It contains the complete concert recorded on December 12, 1969, at the Thelma music venue in Los Angeles, California. It was produced as a limited edition of 14,000 numbered copies, and was released on May 1, 2014.

A bonus disc was included with shipments of the album to 2014 Dave's Picks subscribers. This disc contains tracks recorded on the previous night at the same venue.

== Critical reception ==
Professional ratings
Review scores
Source	Rating
AllMusic	4/5 stars

On AllMusic, Fred Thomas wrote, "Dave's Picks, Vol. 10: Thelma, Los Angeles, CA 12/12/69 captures the group in performance directly before they would enter the studio to record what would go on to be one of their most loved albums, and they're working through the material by playing seven of the eight songs that would be included there as well as an uncommonly high number of songs written or led by keyboardist Pigpen. On the last of a three-night stand at a mysterious California club simply called Thelma, the Dead turned in stellar performances of the aforementioned Workingman's Dead material as well as a half-hour jam on their bluesy live staple "Turn On Your Love Light"."

== Track listing ==
Disc 1
First set:

1. "Cold Rain and Snow" (traditional, arranged by Grateful Dead) – 5:53
2. "Me and My Uncle" (John Phillips) – 4:05
3. "Easy Wind" (Robert Hunter) – 9:33
4. "Cumberland Blues" (Jerry Garcia, Phil Lesh, Hunter) – 7:39
5. "Black Peter" (Garcia, Hunter) – 12:19
6. "Next Time You See Me" (William Harvey, Earl Forest) – 5:43
7. "China Cat Sunflower >" (Garcia, Hunter) – 5:19
8. "I Know You Rider" (traditional, arranged by Grateful Dead) – 5:55

Disc 2

1. "Turn On Your Lovelight" (Joseph Scott, Deadric Malone) – 31:57

Second set:

2. "Hard to Handle" (Otis Redding, Alvertis Isbell, Allen Jones) – 4:40
3. "Casey Jones" (Garcia, Hunter) – 4:55
4. "Mama Tried" (Merle Haggard) – 2:37
5. "High Time" (Garcia, Hunter) – 7:34
6. "Dire Wolf" (Garcia, Hunter) – 4:51
7. "Good Lovin'" (Rudy Clark, Arthur Resnick) – 6:18
8. "I'm a King Bee" (James Moore) – 7:44

Disc 3

1. "Uncle John's Band >" (Garcia, Hunter) – 8:39
2. "He Was a Friend of Mine" (traditional, arranged by Grateful Dead) – 4:13
3. "Alligator >" (Lesh, Ron McKernan, Hunter) – 4:08
4. "Drums >" (Mickey Hart, Bill Kreutzmann) – 7:00
5. "Alligator >" (Lesh, McKernan, Hunter) – 9:15
6. "Caution (Do Not Stop on Tracks) >" (Grateful Dead) – 22:43
7. "Feedback >" (Grateful Dead) – 7:11
8. "And We Bid You Goodnight" (traditional, arranged by Grateful Dead) – 3:27

Dave's Picks 2014 Bonus Disc
Thelma, Los Angeles, California, December 11, 1969:

1. "Dark Star >" (Garcia, Hart, Kreutzmann, Lesh, McKernan, Bob Weir, Hunter) – 20:20
2. "St. Stephen >" (Garcia, Lesh, Hunter) – 13:10
3. "The Eleven >" (Lesh, Hunter) – 8:54
4. "Cumberland Blues" (Garcia, Lesh, Hunter) – 5:02
5. "That's It for the Other One >" – 24:06
  - "Cryptical Envelopment >" (Garcia)
  - "Drums >" (Hart, Kreutzmann)
  - "The Other One >" (Weir, Kreutzmann)
  - "Cryptical Envelopment" (Garcia)
6. "Cosmic Charlie" (Garcia, Hunter) – 7:17

Note: The set list for the December 11, 1969 Thelma Theater concert was:

First set: "Black Peter" · "Me and My Uncle" · "Hard to Handle" · "Dark Star"^{[A]} · "St. Stephen"^{[A]} · "The Eleven"^{[A]} · "Cumberland Blues"^{[A]}

Second set: "Morning Dew" · "Next Time You See Me" · "Sittin' on Top of the World" · "Beat It On Down the Line" · "Big Boss Man" · "Good Lovin'" · "High Time" · "Dancing in the Street" · "Easy Wind" · "Cryptical Envelopment"^{[A]} · "Drums"^{[A]} · "The Other One"^{[A]} · "Cryptical Envelopment"^{[A]} · "Cosmic Charlie"^{[A]}

[A] Included in Dave's Picks 2014 Bonus Disc

== Personnel ==
Grateful Dead

- Tom Constanten – keyboards
- Jerry Garcia – guitar, vocals
- Mickey Hart – drums
- Bill Kreutzmann – drums
- Phil Lesh – electric bass, vocals
- Ron "Pigpen" McKernan – harmonica, percussion, vocals
- Bob Weir – guitar, vocals

Production

- Produced by Grateful Dead
- Original recordings produced by Owsley Stanley
- Produced for release by David Lemieux
- Executive producer: Mark Pinkus
- Associate producers: Doran Tyson, Ryan Wilson
- CD Mastering: Jeffrey Norman
- Art direction, design: Steve Vance
- Cover art: Tony Millionaire
- Tape research: Michael Wesley Johnson
- Archival research: Nicholas Meriwether
- Liner notes: Gary Lambert
