= Live at Hampton Coliseum =

Live album by Grateful Dead
- Released: April 19, 2014
- Recorded: May 4, 1979
- Genre: Rock
- Label: Rhino
- Producer: Grateful Dead

Grateful Dead chronology
Dave's Picks Volume 9 (2014)	Live at Hampton Coliseum (2014)	Dave's Picks Volume 10 (2014)

Live at Hampton Coliseum is an album by the rock band the Grateful Dead. It was recorded on May 4, 1979, at the Hampton Coliseum in Hampton, Virginia. Produced as a two-disc vinyl LP, in a limited edition of 7,900 numbered copies, it was released on April 19, 2014, in conjunction with Record Store Day.

The May 4, 1979 concert was the band's first show at Hampton Coliseum, and their third with then-new keyboardist Brent Mydland.

== Track listing ==
Side one

1. "Loser" (Jerry Garcia, Robert Hunter) – 7:39
2. "New Minglewood Blues" (traditional, arranged by Grateful Dead) – 5:14
3. "Don't Ease Me In" (traditional, arranged by Grateful Dead) – 3:20
4. "Passenger" (Phil Lesh, Peter Monk) – 5:36

Side two

1. "I Need a Miracle" (Bob Weir, John Barlow) – 4:26
2. "Bertha" (Garcia, Hunter) – 6:26
3. "Good Lovin'" (Rudy Clark, Arthur Resnick) – 6:51
4. "Ship of Fools" (Garcia, Hunter) – 7:36

Side three

1. "Estimated Prophet" (Weir, Barlow) – 12:24
2. "Eyes of the World" (Garcia, Hunter) – 13:21

Side four

1. "Truckin'" (Garcia, Lesh, Weir, Hunter) – 8:14
2. "Stella Blue" (Garcia, Hunter) – 10:39
3. "Around and Around" (Chuck Berry) – 7:20

== Personnel ==
Grateful Dead

- Jerry Garcia – guitar, vocals
- Mickey Hart – drums
- Bill Kreutzmann – drums
- Phil Lesh – bass guitar
- Brent Mydland – keyboards, vocals
- Bob Weir – guitar, vocals

Production

- Produced by Grateful Dead
- Produced for release by David Lemieux
- Executive producer: Mark Pinkus
- Associate producers: Doran Tyson, Ryan Wilson
- LP mastering: Jeffrey Norman
- Lacquers cut by: Chris Bellman
- Recording: Dan Healy
- Illustrations: Kyle Field
- Photography: James R. Anderson
- Art direction, design: Jonathan Lane

== Concert set list ==
The complete set list for the May 4, 1979 concert at Hampton Coliseum was:

- First set: "Mississippi Half-Step Uptown Toodeloo" > "Franklin's Tower", "Mama Tried" > "Mexicali Blues", "Candyman", "Lazy Lightning" > "Supplication", "Loser"*, "New Minglewood Blues"*, "Don't Ease Me In"*, "Passenger"*
- Second set: "I Need a Miracle"* > "Bertha"* > "Good Lovin'"*, "Ship of Fools"*, "Estimated Prophet"* > "Eyes Of The World"* > "Drums" > "Space" > "Truckin'"* > "Stella Blue"* > "Around and Around"*

* Included in Live at Hampton Coliseum
