= Dahlberg Arena =

Multi-purpose Arena in Missoula, Montana, United States

University of Montana Dahlberg Arena
- "The Fieldhouse"
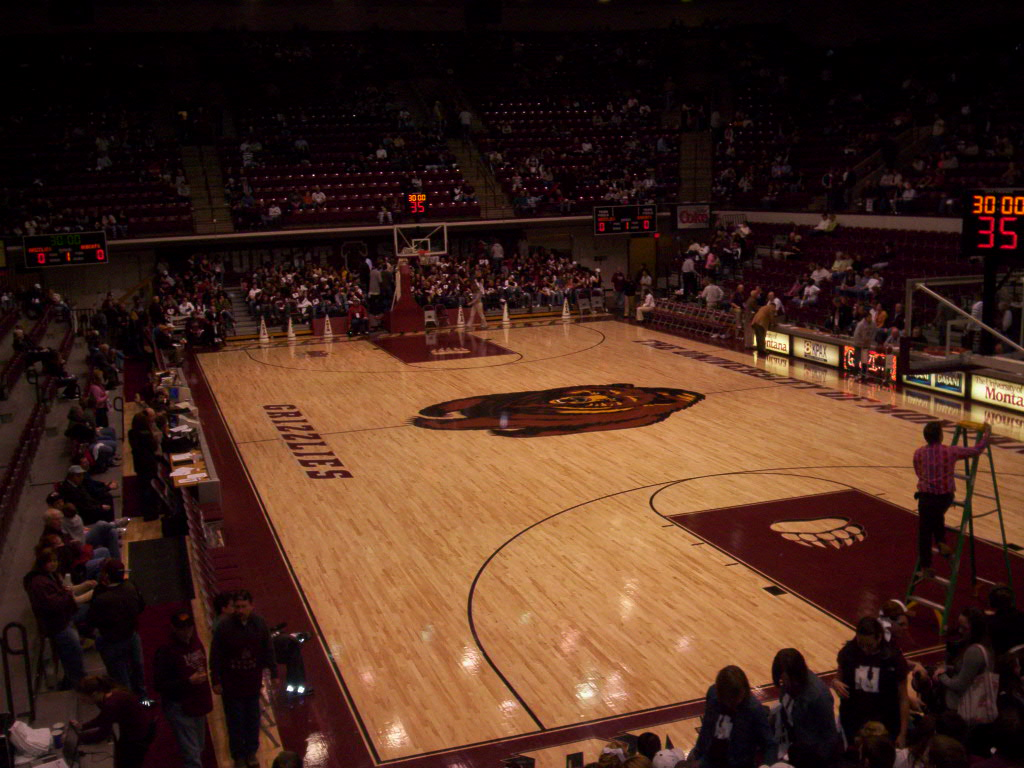
- Basketball court in 2006
- Interactive map of University of Montana; Dahlberg Arena
- Former names: Harry Adams Field House (1966–1999); UM Field House (1953–1966)
- Location: University of Montana; 32 Campus Drive; Missoula, Montana
- Coordinates: 46.864°N 113.983°W
- Owner: University of Montana
- Operator: University of Montana
- Capacity: 7,321 (basketball); 5,500 (concerts)
- Surface: Wood

Construction
- Groundbreaking: 1951
- Opened: December 18, 1953
- Renovated: 1999
- Cost: $800,000 ($9.63 million in 2025 dollars) $14.7 million (1999 renovation) ($28.4 million in 2025 dollars)

Tenant
- University of Montana Grizzlies (NCAA)

Dahlberg Arena is a 7,321-seat multi-purpose arena in the western United States, located on the campus of the University of Montana in Missoula. The arena opened in 1953 and is home to the Montana Grizzlies and Lady Griz basketball teams. It has hosted the Big Sky Conference men's basketball tournament five times: 1978, 1991, 1992, 2000, and 2012.

Opened in late 1953, the field house was named for newly retired track coach Harry Adams in June 1966. In the 1980s, Adams Field House seated over 9,000 and was known as the toughest arena for visiting teams in the Big Sky due to its belligerent crowd and (at one time) tartan flooring, and also enjoyed a national reputation. Its laminated wood arches were constructed in Portland, Oregon. The elevation of the floor is approximately 3,200 feet (980 m) above sea level.

Alumnus George P. (Jiggs) Dahlberg was head coach of the Grizzlies from 1937 to 1955 and retired as athletic director in 1961. He was one of four brothers known as "The Four Norseman of Butte" who competed in athletics for the Griz.

The arena can be configured to seat 5,500 people for a traditionally staged concert or can use all of the seats for a concert with a central stage. It has hosted many concerts, including Pearl Jam, Grateful Dead, Gym Class Heroes, Rascal Flatts, and Macklemore.

== See also ==
- List of NCAA Division I basketball arenas
