= Dave's Picks Volume 8 =

Live album by Grateful Dead
- Released: November 1, 2013
- Recorded: November 30, 1980, Fox Theatre, Atlanta, Georgia, United States
- Genre: Rock
- Length: 188:03
- Label: Rhino
- Producer: Grateful Dead

Grateful Dead chronology
Sunshine Daydream (2013)	Dave's Picks Volume 8 (2013)	Family Dog at the Great Highway, San Francisco, CA 4/18/70 (2013)

Dave's Picks Volume 8 is a three-CD live album by the rock band the Grateful Dead. It contains the complete concert from November 30, 1980, at the Fox Theatre in Atlanta, Georgia. It was produced as a limited edition of 13,000 numbered copies, and was released on November 1, 2013.

This album is the first officially released Grateful Dead matrix recording. Matrix recordings digitally synchronize an amateur audience recording with the soundboard audio to add the natural, reverberant sound of the performance hall and the excitement of the audience. This can increase the "live feel" of what might be a "dry", or sometimes relatively lifeless recording. Various ratios of the two can be blended to reduce sound errors from microphone bleeding or errant mixing levels while adding the ambient sounds of the venue and lessening the possibly amateurish sound quality captured by microphones in the audience.

Volume 8 was the first of the Dave's Picks albums to feature Brent Mydland on keyboards, and the first that was recorded after the 1970s.

In a November 2012 article in The New Yorker about the vast recorded legacy of the Grateful Dead, Nick Paumgarten had written about an audience recording of this concert. He was then asked to write the album liner notes, which discuss the provenance of the unusually high quality audience recording (captured from the balcony by Bob Wagner) and reference the popular Martin Mull quote comparing writing about music to "dancing about architecture".

== Track listing ==
Disc 1
First set:

1. "Feel Like a Stranger" (Bob Weir, John Perry Barlow) – 9:19
2. "Loser" (Jerry Garcia, Robert Hunter) – 8:17
3. "Cassidy" (Weir, Barlow) – 5:14
4. "Ramble On Rose" (Garcia, Hunter) – 7:55
5. "Little Red Rooster" (Willie Dixon) – 9:33
6. "Bird Song" (Garcia, Hunter) – 9:22
7. "Me and My Uncle" > (John Phillips) – 2:59
8. "Big River" (Johnny Cash) – 5:55
9. "It Must Have Been the Roses" (Hunter) – 7:13

Disc 2

1. "Lost Sailor" > (Weir, Barlow) – 6:34
2. "Saint of Circumstance" (Weir, Barlow) – 6:31
3. "Deal" (Garcia, Hunter) – 8:03

Second set:

4. "Scarlet Begonias" > (Garcia, Hunter) – 11:44
5. "Fire on the Mountain" (Mickey Hart, Hunter) – 10:50
6. "Samson and Delilah" (traditional, arranged by Weir) – 7:40
7. "Ship of Fools" (Garcia, Hunter) – 8:49

Disc 3

1. "Playing in the Band" > (Weir, Hart, Hunter) – 15:53
2. "Drums" > (Hart, Bill Kreutzmann) – 11:25
3. "Space" > (Garcia, Phil Lesh, Weir) – 4:23
4. "The Wheel" > (Garcia, Kreutzmann, Hunter) – 6:49
5. "China Doll" > (Garcia, Hunter) – 6:50
6. "Around and Around" > (Chuck Berry) – 4:01
7. "Johnny B. Goode" (Berry) – 4:49

Encore:

8. "Uncle John's Band" (Garcia, Hunter) – 7:46

== Personnel ==
Grateful Dead

- Jerry Garcia – guitar, vocals
- Mickey Hart – drums
- Bill Kreutzmann – drums
- Phil Lesh – electric bass
- Brent Mydland – keyboards, vocals
- Bob Weir – guitar, vocals

Production

- Produced by Grateful Dead
- Produced for release by David Lemieux
- Executive producer: Mark Pinkus
- Associate producers: Doran Tyson, Ryan Wilson
- Mastering: Jeffrey Norman
- Recording: Dan Healy
- Additional recording: Bob Wagner
- Art direction, design: Steve Vance
- Cover art: Timothy Truman
- Tape research: Michael Wesley Johnson
- Archival research: Nicholas Meriwether
- Photography: Jay Blakesberg
- Liner notes essay "The Fox's Den" by Nick Paumgarten
