= Dave's Picks Volume 9 =

Live album by Grateful Dead
- Released: February 1, 2014
- Recorded: May 14, 1974, Adams Field House, Missoula, Montana, United States
- Genre: Rock
- Length: 181:52
- Label: Rhino
- Producer: Grateful Dead

Grateful Dead chronology
Family Dog at the Great Highway, San Francisco, CA 4/18/70 (2013)	Dave's Picks Volume 9 (2014)	Live at Hampton Coliseum (2014)

Dave's Picks Volume 9 is a three-CD live album by the American rock band the Grateful Dead. It contains the complete concert from May 14, 1974, at the Harry Adams Field House in Missoula, Montana. It was produced as a limited edition of 14,000 numbered copies, and was released on February 1, 2014.

The album documents the only concert performed by the Grateful Dead in Montana At this show the band used their Wall of Sound concert sound system.

== Critical reception ==
Professional ratings
Review scores
Source	Rating
Rolling Stone	4/5 stars

In Rolling Stone, Will Hermes wrote, "on this era-epitomizing set, recorded at the University of Montana, [the Grateful Dead are] on point. Jerry Garcia's wah-wah and Keith Godchaux's Fender Rhodes pull jams into Miles Davis free funk territory; vocalist Donna Godchaux adds signature off-notes; and the slow stuff shines brightest."

On NPR, Milo Miles said, "this does seem like an exceptional Grateful Dead gig. Many even very strong Dead shows have a period where the band's impulses get out of sync and the momentum gets lost for a few, or quite a few, minutes. That doesn't happen here, even in the extended "Weather Report Suite" that incorporates "Dark Star" and "China Doll." Just as surprising, keyboardist Keith Godchaux and his wife, singer Donna, are at their most precise and restrained; their ability to enrich the band's sound is evident."

On AllMusic, Fred Thomas wrote, "Saying the band was deep into one of its jammier phases would be a tremendous understatement, with the set list getting into exploratory versions of crowd favorites like "Jack Straw" as well as a stunning rendition of "Weather Report Suite" that blurs into a particularly epic "Dark Star", as well as some of the most jazz-influenced playing the Dead would branch into that year on "Playing in the Band"."

== Track listing ==
Disc 1
First set:

1. "Bertha" (Jerry Garcia, Robert Hunter) – 6:15
2. "Me and My Uncle" (John Phillips) – 3:15
3. "Loser" (Garcia, Hunter) – 6:39
4. "Black-Throated Wind" (Bob Weir, John Perry Barlow) – 6:52
5. "Scarlet Begonias" (Garcia, Hunter) – 7:21
6. "It Must Have Been the Roses" (Hunter) – 5:44
7. "Jack Straw" (Weir, Hunter) – 5:18
8. "Tennessee Jed" (Garcia, Hunter) – 8:18
9. "Mexicali Blues" (Weir, Barlow) – 3:39
10. "Deal" (Garcia, Hunter) – 4:46

Disc 2

1. "Big River" (Johnny Cash) – 5:21
2. "Brown-Eyed Woman" (Garcia, Hunter) – 5:13
3. "Playing in the Band" (Weir, Mickey Hart, Hunter) – 20:49

Second set:

4. "U.S. Blues" (Garcia, Hunter) – 5:48
5. "El Paso" (Marty Robbins) – 4:44
6. "Row Jimmy" (Garcia, Hunter) – 8:52

Disc 3

1. "Weather Report Suite" > – 16:08
  - "Prelude" (Weir)
  - "Part I" (Weir, Eric Andersen)
  - "Part II (Let It Grow)" (Weir, Barlow)
2. "Dark Star" > (Garcia, Hart, Bill Kreutzmann, Phil Lesh, Ron McKernan, Weir, Hunter) – 26:39
3. "China Doll" (Garcia, Hunter) – 5:52
4. "Promised Land" (Chuck Berry) – 3:46
5. "Not Fade Away" > (Norman Petty, Charles Hardin) – 6:15
6. "Goin' Down the Road Feeling Bad" (traditional, arranged by Grateful Dead) – 9:58

Encore:

7. "One More Saturday Night" (Weir) – 4:50

== Personnel ==
Grateful Dead

- Jerry Garcia – guitar, vocals
- Donna Jean Godchaux – vocals
- Keith Godchaux – keyboards
- Bill Kreutzmann – drums
- Phil Lesh – electric bass, vocals
- Bob Weir – guitar, vocals

Production

- Produced by Grateful Dead
- Produced for release by David Lemieux
- Executive producer: Mark Pinkus
- Associate producers: Doran Tyson, Ryan Wilson
- Mastering: Jeffrey Norman
- Recording: Kidd Candelario
- Art direction, design: Steve Vance
- Cover art: Tony Millionaire
- Tape research: Michael Wesley Johnson
- Archival research: Nicholas Merriwether
- Photography: John Conroy, Richard Pechner
- Liner notes: David Lemieux
