= Fox Theatre (Atlanta) =

Performing arts theater and former movie theater in Atlanta, Georgia, United States

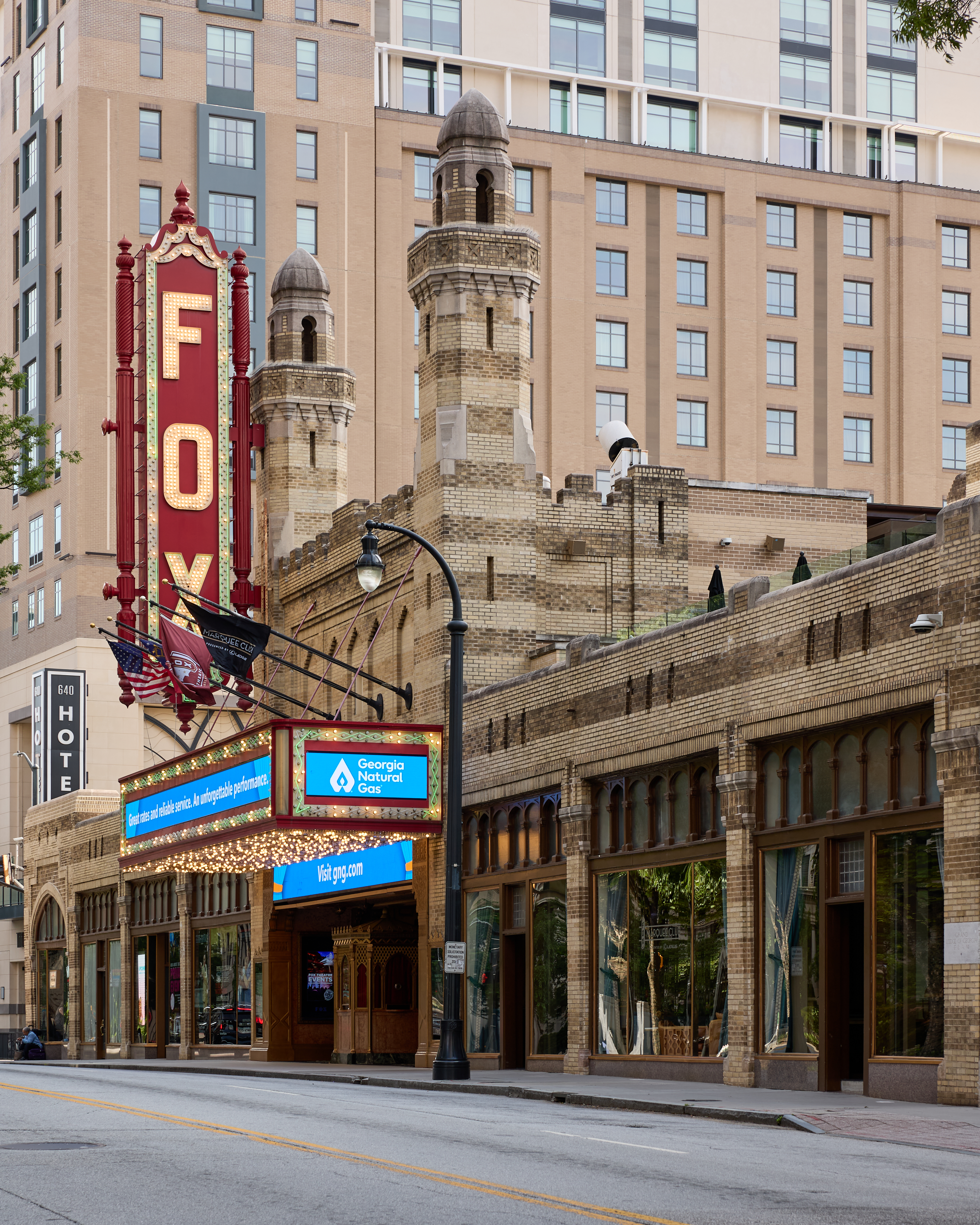
- The Fox Theatre in 2024
- Address: 660 Peachtree Street NE; Atlanta, Georgia; U.S.
- Owner: Fox Theatre Inc.
- Capacity: 4,665
- Type: Movie Theater Palace
- Screen: 1

Construction
- Opened: 1929; 97 years ago
- Reopened: 1991; 35 years ago

Tenant
- Broadway Across America

Website
- www.foxtheatre.org
- Fox Theatre
- U.S. National Register of Historic Places
- U.S. National Historic Landmark
- Atlanta Landmark Building
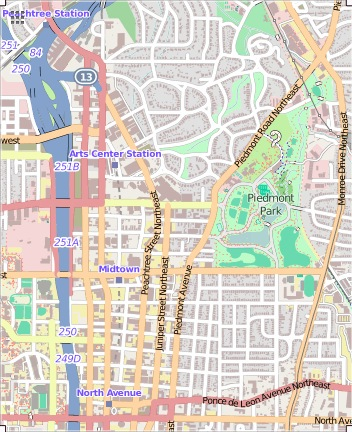
- Location within Atlanta Midtown
- Coordinates: 33°46′21″N 84°23′8″W
- Architect: Olivier J. Vinour
- Part of: Fox Theatre Historic District (ID78003178)
- NRHP reference No.: 74002230

Significant dates
- Added to NRHP: May 17, 1974
- Designated NHL: May 11, 1976
- Designated ALB: October 23, 1989

The Fox Theatre (often marketed as the Fabulous Fox), is a performing arts venue and a former movie palace, located at 660 Peachtree Street NE in Midtown Atlanta, Georgia, and is the centerpiece of the Fox Theatre Historic District.

The theater was originally planned as part of a large Shrine Temple as evidenced by its Moorish design. The 4,665-seat auditorium was ultimately developed as a lavish movie theater in the Fox Theatres chain and opened in 1929. It hosts a variety of cultural and artistic events including the Atlanta Ballet, a summer film series, and performances by national touring companies of Broadway shows. The venue also hosts occasional concerts by popular artists.

== Architectural features ==
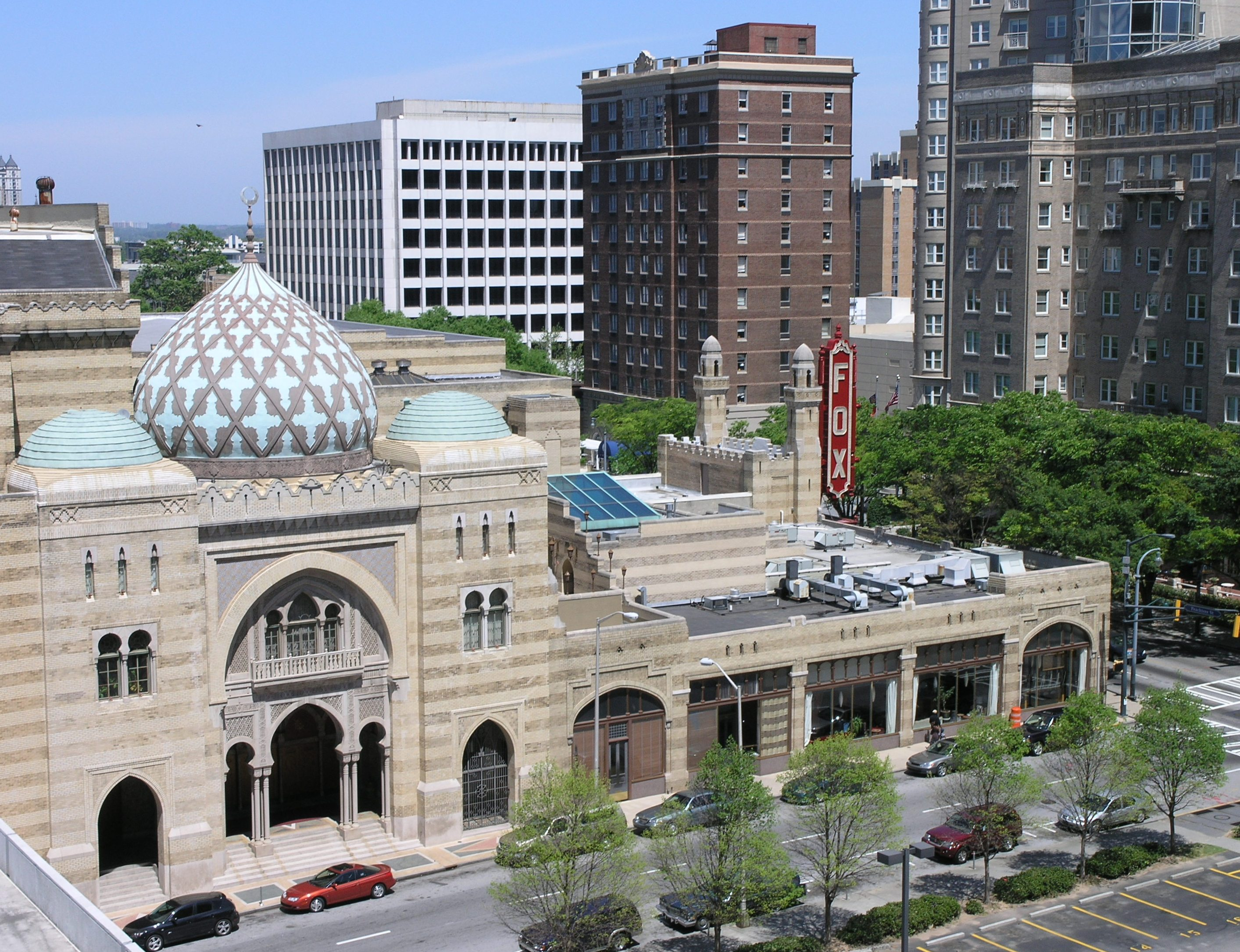
View from nearby building showing notable architectural features

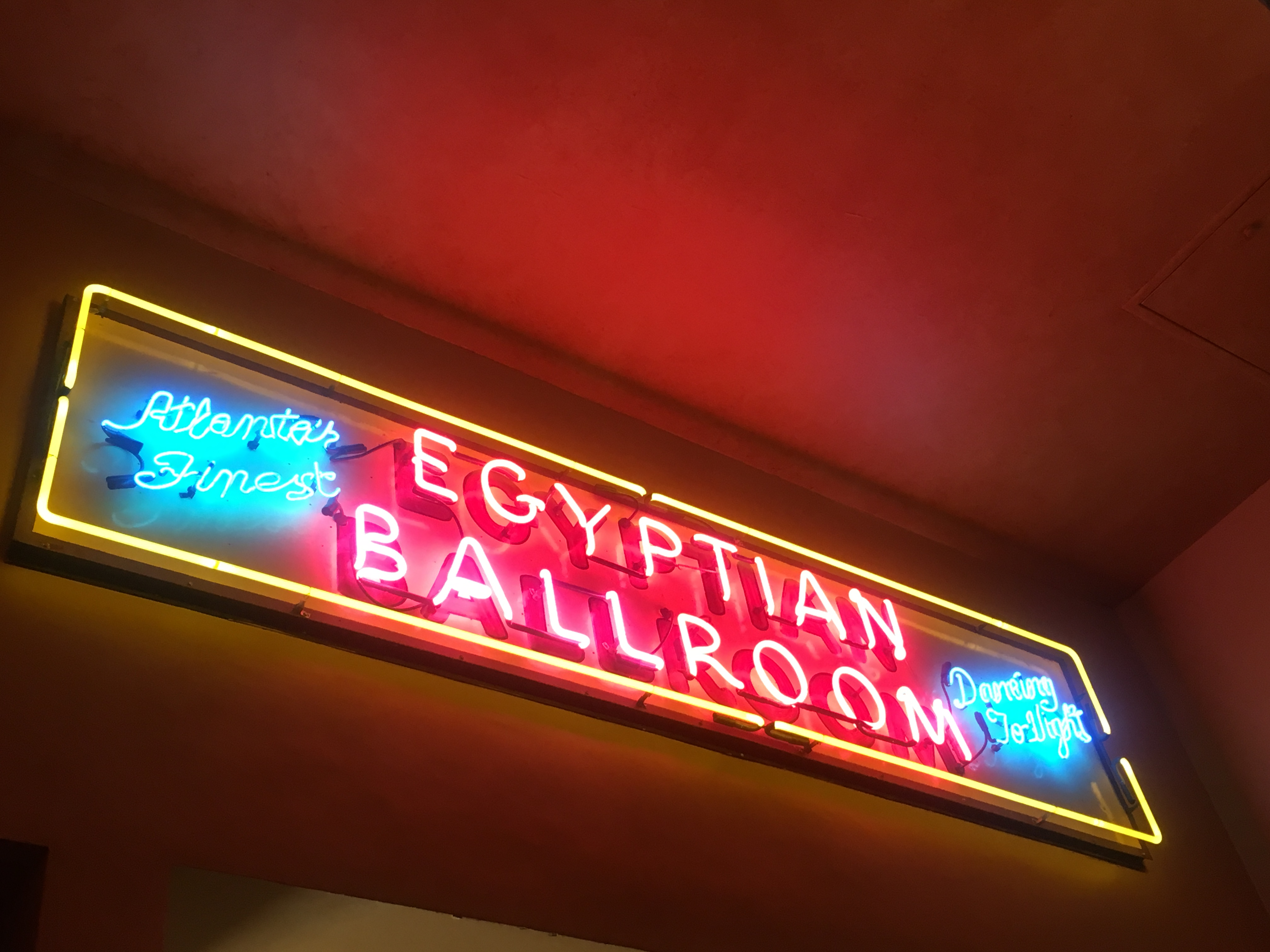
Entrance to the Egyptian Ballroom at Fox Theater

When the Fox Theatre first opened, the local newspaper described it as having, "a picturesque and almost disturbing grandeur beyond imagination". It remains a showplace that impresses theater-goers to this day. The principal architect of the project was Olivier Vinour of the firm Marye, Alger and Vinour.

The original architecture and décor of the Fox can be roughly divided into two architectural styles: Islamic architecture (building exterior, auditorium, Grand Salon, mezzanine Gentlemen's Lounge and lower Ladies Lounge) and Egyptian architecture (Egyptian Ballroom, mezzanine Ladies Lounge and lower Gentlemen's Lounge). The 4,665-seat auditorium, which was designed for movies and live performances, replicates an Arabian courtyard, complete with 96 embedded crystal "stars" (a third of which flicker) in its ceiling and a projection of clouds that slowly drift across this "night sky". A longstanding rumor that one of the stars was a piece of a Coca-Cola bottle was confirmed in June 2010 when two members of the theater's restoration staff conducted a search from within the attic above the auditorium ceiling.

The Egyptian Ballroom is designed after a temple for Ramses II at Karnak while the mezzanine Ladies Lounge features a replica of the throne chair of King Tut and makeup tables that feature tiny Sphinxes. The Islamic sections feature a number of ablution fountains, which are currently kept dry.

Throughout the Fox there is extensive use of trompe-l'œil; "wooden" beams are actually plaster, paint that appears gold leaf is not, areas are painted and lit to appear to receive outside lighting, ornate fireplaces were never designed to have working chimneys, and what appears to be a giant Bedouin canopy in the auditorium is plaster and steel rods designed to help funnel sound to the farthest balcony.

The Fox Theatre gives regular tours of the building's interior.

== History ==
Originally designed as the Yaarab Shrine Temple, the headquarters for a 5,000-member Shriners organization, the $2.75 million project exceeded the Shriners' budget, so they leased the auditorium to movie mogul William Fox, who was building theaters around the country at the time. The theater opened on December 25, 1929, just two months after the stock market crash and the start of the Great Depression. A week later, on New Year's Day, the Shriners inaugurated their new "mosque" in their part of the building, which contained executive offices, a large lounge, a ballroom/banquet hall, kitchen, practice hall, and locker-shower room. Under the terms of the lease, they remained as paying tenants until 1949.

According to the National Park Service, "the Fox Theatre closed only 125 weeks after it opened. Members of the Yaarab Temple could not meet their [mortgage payments], and by 1932, William Fox was bankrupt." After the mortgage was foreclosed in December 1932, the entire complex was purchased jointly by Paramount Pictures and Lucas & Jenkins, a Georgia company that owned a hundred theatres.

In 1939, the movie most associated with Atlanta and the South, Gone with the Wind, premiered at the now-demolished Loew's Grand Theatre rather than the Fox. Although GWTW was produced by Selznick International, it was distributed by Loew's Incorporated as part of a deal with rival studio Metro-Goldwyn-Mayer. The parade down Peachtree Street for the movie's premier coincidentally started just outside the Fox because the movie's cast was staying across the street at the Georgian Terrace Hotel.

On November 12, 1946, Walt Disney's Song of the South premiered at the theater, Walt Disney has made introductory remarks, introduced the cast of the film and left the theater for his room at the Georgian Terrace Hotel just across the street from the theater. The star of the film James Baskett was unable to attend the film's premiere at the Fox because Atlanta was a segregated city at the time. RKO Radio Pictures released Song of the South nationwide along with its premiere at the Fox Theatre.

During the 1940s, the Fox acquired strong management and became one of the finest movie theaters in Atlanta. It was also at this time that the Egyptian Ballroom became Atlanta's most popular public dance hall and hosted all the important big bands and country and western swing bands of the era. It was notable at that time for being the only theater in Atlanta allowing both white and black patrons. However, there was a separate black box office, entrance, and seating; the segregation wall in the middle of the second dress seating still remains, and the "colored" box office window stands unused at the back entrance. These are left in place for educational and historical purposes. The theater was integrated in 1962.

During the 1970s, several elements collided to bring about the Fox's decline – white flight, the rise of suburban multiplex theaters, and changes in how films were distributed. In 1974, Southern Bell, the regional arm of AT&T, approached the owners of the theater with an offer to buy and with the intent of tearing it down and building the parking deck for a new headquarters on the site. A group was formed to save the theater and it was placed on the National Register of Historic Places in May 1974. The ensuing public outcry and massive campaign, including such entertainers as Liberace and Lynyrd Skynyrd (recording their first live album there and debuting guitarist Ed King's replacement, Steve Gaines, to the world), among other celebrities, resulted in the city refusing to issue a demolition permit. Ultimately, a complicated deal was brokered that prevented the Fox's demolition. The Southern Bell Building (now Tower Square) was built on land adjacent to the theater on the building's west side in conjunction with the construction of the North Avenue MARTA station, with its parking deck built on the north end of the property at the corner of West Peachtree and 3rd streets. The U.S. Department of the Interior subsequently named the Fox a National Historic Landmark on May 26, 1976, citing its architectural uniqueness.

After the Fox was saved from demolition, a lengthy and expensive restoration process began. Much of the original décor had survived and new pieces were created with the help of old photographs. Today, the Fox appears much as it did when it opened, with some additions that were in the original plans but had to be scrapped in the 1920s due to financial constraints. Other changes have been made to bring the building up to current safety codes.

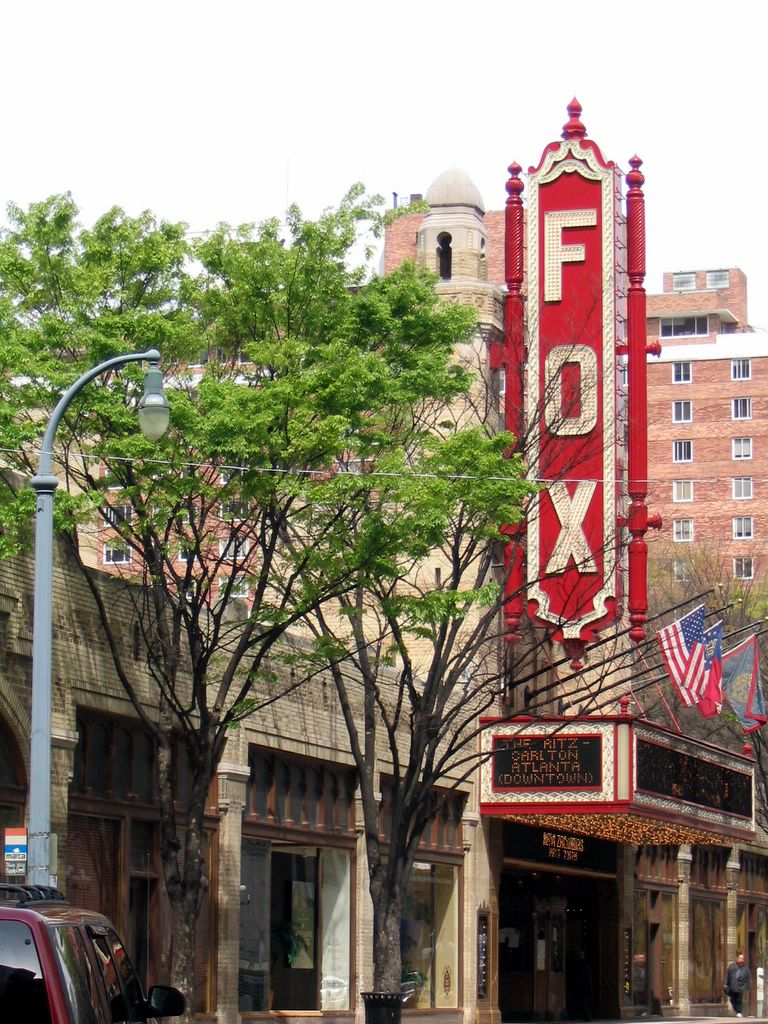
The Fox Theatre, facing northwest

The Fox is now the only remaining movie palace in Atlanta. The Loew's Grand, Martin Cinerama, Georgia Cinerama, Paramount Theater, and the Roxy Theater, all once-famous Atlanta movie palaces, are gone, and others that opened in the 1960s have since been converted to multiplexes. The Fox Theatre, now run under the non-profit Atlanta Landmarks, Inc., hosts a multitude of cultural and artistic events, including the Atlanta Ballet's annual Nutcracker performances, a summer film series, and performances for various national touring companies of Broadway shows. Because of its origins as a movie house, the Fox has a shallow stage by theatrical standards and is unable—without extensive but temporary alterations—to accommodate some of the set pieces required by modern large scale shows such as The Lion King and Miss Saigon.

In June 2006, the theater installed a $130,000 digital cinema video projection system, which debuted with a showing of The Chronicles of Narnia: The Lion, the Witch and the Wardrobe on June 26, part of the Summer Film Festival. The sing-alongs that precede each feature are still shown by the Brenograph Movie projector which was installed in 1929.

The Egyptian Ballroom and the Grand Salon are rented regularly for corporate and private functions, including banquets, fundraisers, weddings, trade shows and conventions. They are also both popular spots for proms for many area high schools. Notably, Oxford College of Emory University hosts its annual Fall Formal in the Egyptian Ballroom.

Every year since Atlanta Landmarks assumed management in 1975, the Fox has generated an operating surplus. An estimated 750,000 people visit the Fox every year. The venue was the site of Prince's final performance, held one week before his death on April 21, 2016. In May 2017, Aquarium Rescue Unit frontman Col. Bruce Hampton died after collapsing onstage at the Fox during a concert celebrating his 70th birthday.

On February 2, 2019, the Fox hosted the NFL Honors ahead of Super Bowl LIII at Mercedes-Benz Stadium.

On July 14–18, 2025, as part of 2025 Major League Baseball All-Star Game festivities, the Fox hosted The Tonight Show Starring Jimmy Fallon.

== Concerts ==
Elvis Presley played at the Fox Theatre in 1956, Bruce Springsteen played it in 1976, 1978 and 1996, Bob Marley and the Wailers performed there on December 12, 1979, in support of his Survival Tour and Pearl Jam played there in 1994, the Rolling Stones in 1978 (as The Cockroaches) and 1981. Georgia musicians the Allman Brothers played at the Fox Theatre in 1980 and performed a three-concert run recorded on September 24, 25, and 26, 2004 and was released as the Fox Box. Ray Charles in 1983, James Brown in 1985, R.E.M. in 1989, the B-52's in 1989 and 2022, the Black Crowes in 1992, Alan Jackson in 1992, Widespread Panic in 1993, Collective Soul in 1996, Jeff Foxworthy in '01, Outkast in 2001, Indigo Girls in '04, Zac Brown Band in 2009 (released on the live album Pass the Jar), Monica in 2010, Mastodon in 2017, Manchester Orchestra in 2018, Drivin' N' Cryin' with Drive-By Truckers in '19, Blackberry Smoke in '19, Travis Tritt in '19, and The Georgia Satellites in 2022.

The Grateful Dead played the Fox nine times between May 1977 and October 1985, and the Jerry Garcia Band also played there on one occasion on April 5, 1976. A number of the Grateful Dead's shows were released officially, starting with their second appearance at the Fox on May 19, 1977 (released as Dick's Picks Volume 29), both their April 1978 shows (April 10, and 11) were released on the box set Friend of the Devils: April 1978, and the show on November 30, 1980 was released on Dave's Picks Volume 8.

On September 17, 2024, the Fox Theatre hosted Jimmy Carter 100: A Celebration in Song, an event concert to celebrate the 100th birthday of former president Jimmy Carter. The event was produced by the Carter Center and featured appearances by musicians and celebrities.

== The Mighty Mo ==
The Fox features a four manual (or keyboard) 42-rank pipe organ nicknamed the "Mighty Mo". It was custom built for the Fox by M. P. Möller, Inc. in 1929 in Hagerstown, Maryland. With 3,622 pipes, it was the second-largest theater organ to be built in the country, behind the Wurlitzer at Radio City Music Hall in New York City and was the largest theater instrument built by Möller.

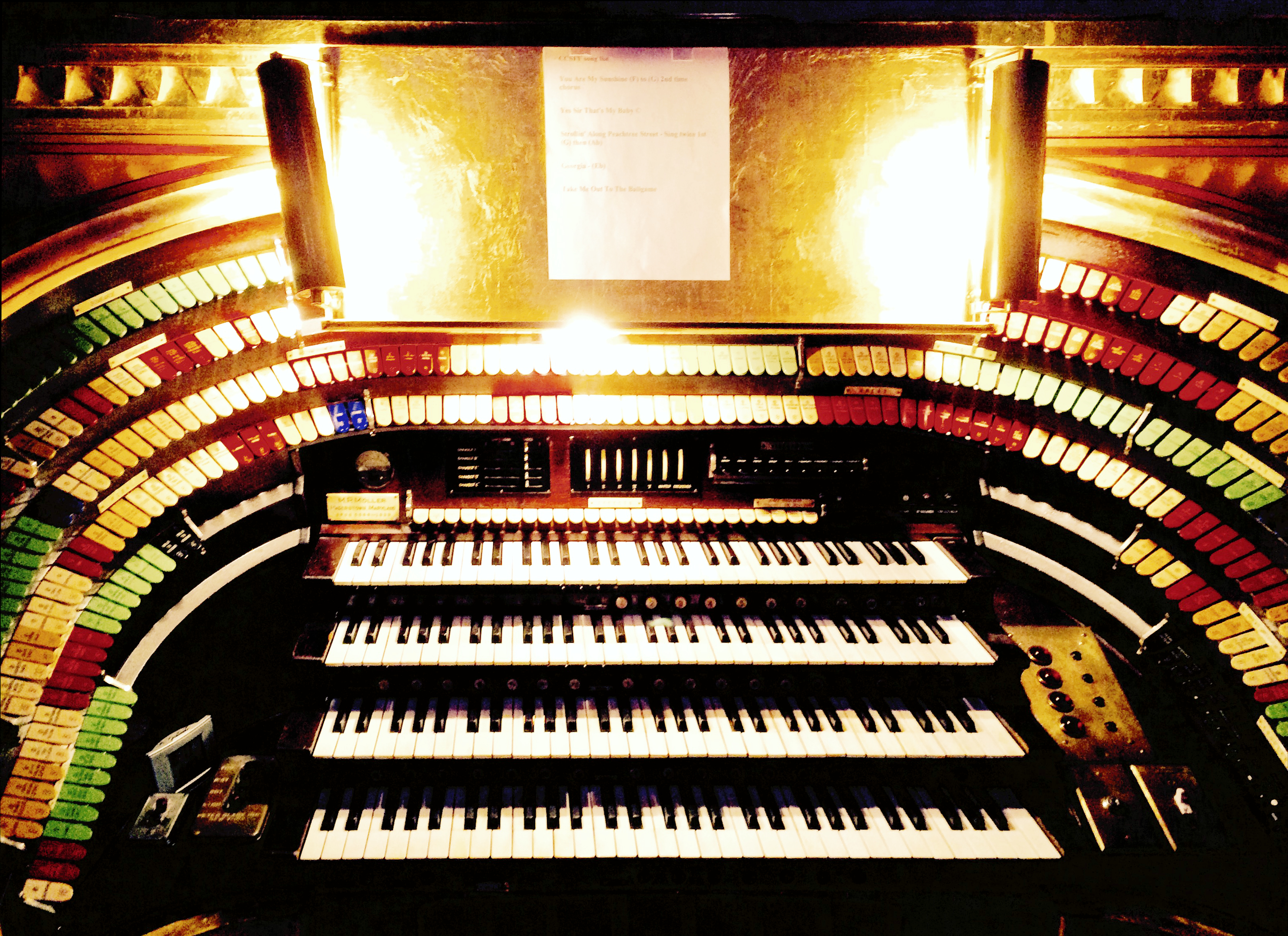
Mighty Mo (opus 5566 / 1929 built) console

As a true theater organ, as opposed to a church organ, Mighty Mo boasts pipes that range in size from 32 feet (nearly 10 meters) tall to the size of a small ballpoint pen, and is designed to imitate the sounds of a full orchestra. Besides the pipes, it also contains a marimba, xylophone, glockenspiel, drums, sleigh bells, a gong, and even a six-foot (1.8m) grand piano (originally from the Kilgen organ in Chicago's Piccadilly Theatre); plus a large variety of silent movie sound effects (such as various car horns, thunder and rain effects, bird whistles, etc.). The organ is remarkable for a theater organ because it also includes 12 ranks of pipes for a church organ, known as the "Ethereal" division. Thus the organ can be played as a church organ as well as a theater organ. It is noteworthy that the Mighty Mo is among the shrinking list of instruments which remain installed in the theaters for which they were designed.

Larry Douglas Embury was the theater's permanent Organist in Residence from 2002 until his death in February 2016. In that capacity he presided over the Mighty Mo in performances during the Fox's summer film festival and the Atlanta Ballet's annual production of The Nutcracker. In September 2002, he hosted "Fox at the Fox," a concert commemorating the twenty-second anniversary of the death of the great concert organist, Virgil Fox. Fox had played a famous series of "Fox at the Fox" concerts on the Mighty Mo at the Fox Theatre in the 1970s.

== Private residence ==
The Fox also contains a 3,640-square-foot (338 m^{2}) apartment that served as the private residence of Joe Patten, who served as technical director from 1974 to 2004. Patten, who was born in 1927, and died on April 7, 2016, was granted a lifetime rent-free lease to the apartment. Patten first became involved with the Fox when he volunteered to restore the theater's Moller pipe organ. He later was instrumental in the movement to save the Fox from demolition. The apartment occupies space previously used as an office by the Shriners, who had built the Fox as a meeting hall. The apartment's walls are 2 to 3 feet (0.91 m) thick, and a passageway leads from the bedroom to a former spotlight platform at the top of the auditorium. A separate entrance provides direct access to the street outside the theater.

Patten's presence is credited with having saved the Fox from a fast-moving fire in April 1996. The pre-dawn blaze, which broke out in the attic wiring, caused $2 million in damage. Damage likely would have been greater if Patten had not been on site to call the fire department, said Alan Thomas, president of Atlanta Landmarks, the nonprofit agency that owns the Fox.

Atlanta Landmarks had no definite plan on how the apartment will be used after Patten's death. "We could use it for dressing space, rehearsal halls," Thomas told the Atlanta Journal-Constitution. "It's unlikely that we'd let anyone else live there."

On August 30, 2010, local news outlets reported a dispute between Patten and the non-profit Atlanta Landmarks which owns the theater. Patten reported that he was being evicted from his apartment by the group which he helped to found. Meanwhile, the Atlanta Landmarks board in a statement to the public indicated their intent to draw a new lease which addressed Patten's health needs. They stated he remained welcome to live in the apartment.

== Gallery ==
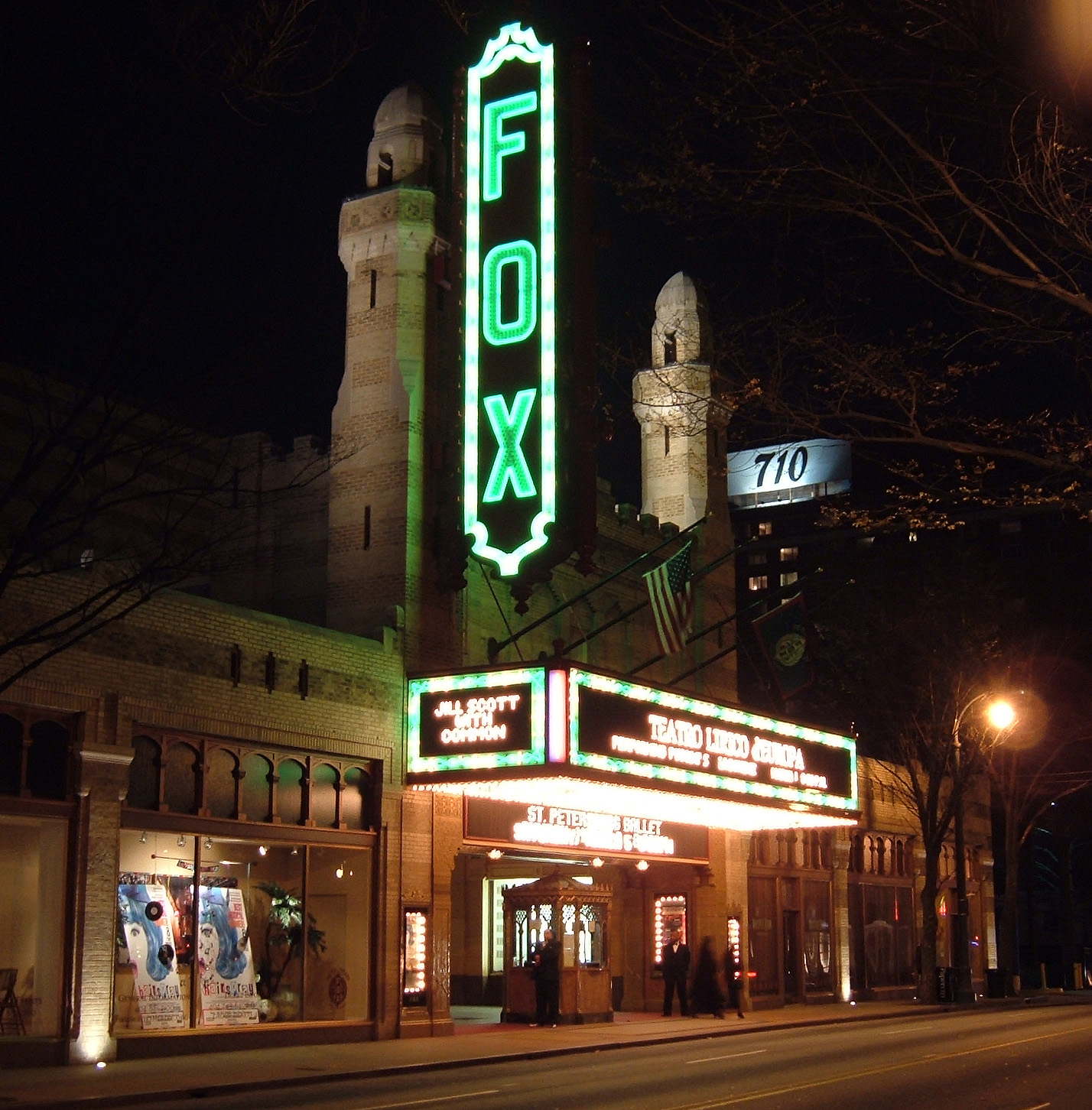
The theatre illuminated at night

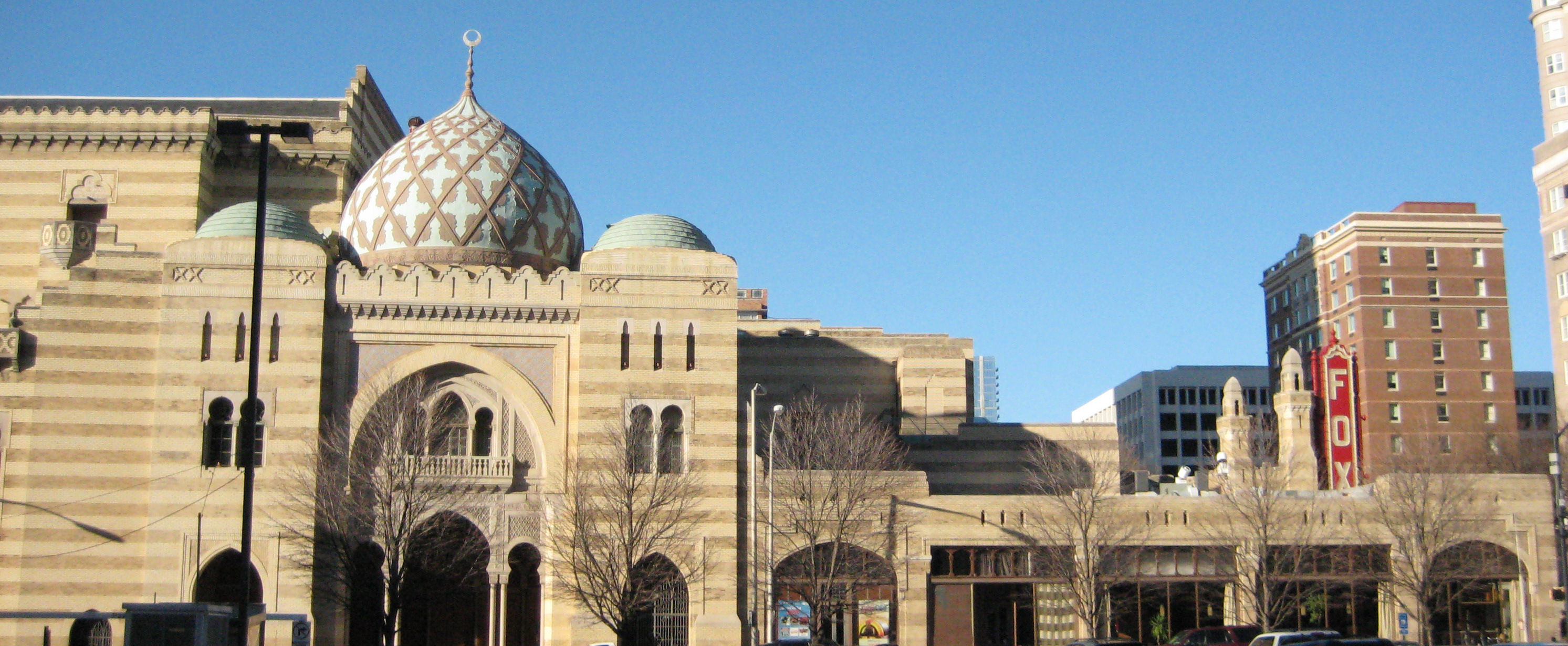
The theatre from Ponce De Leon Ave NE

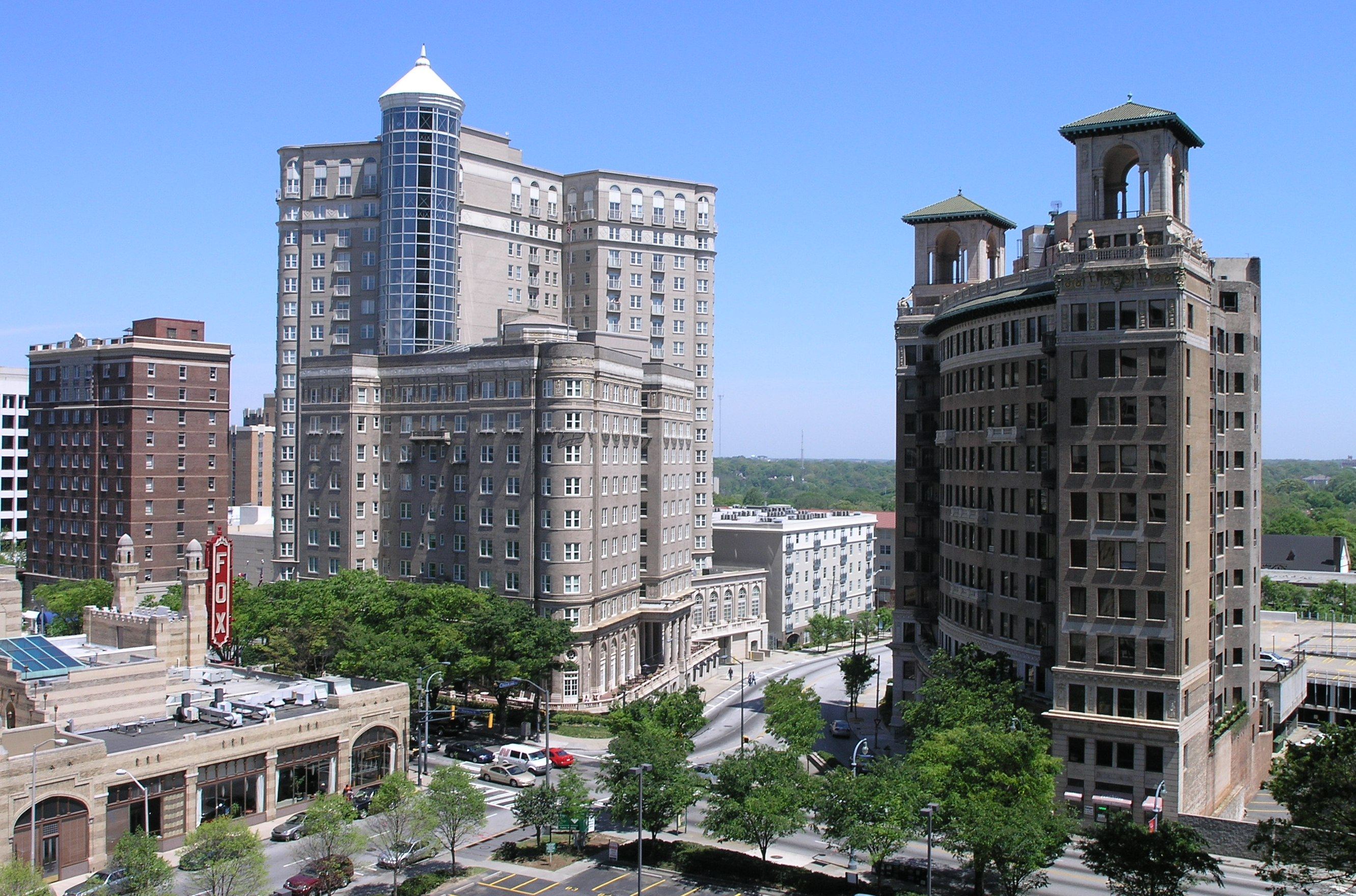
Fox Theatre in foreground with the Cox-Carlton Hotel and Georgian Terrace Hotel in background, with The Ponce Condos to the right

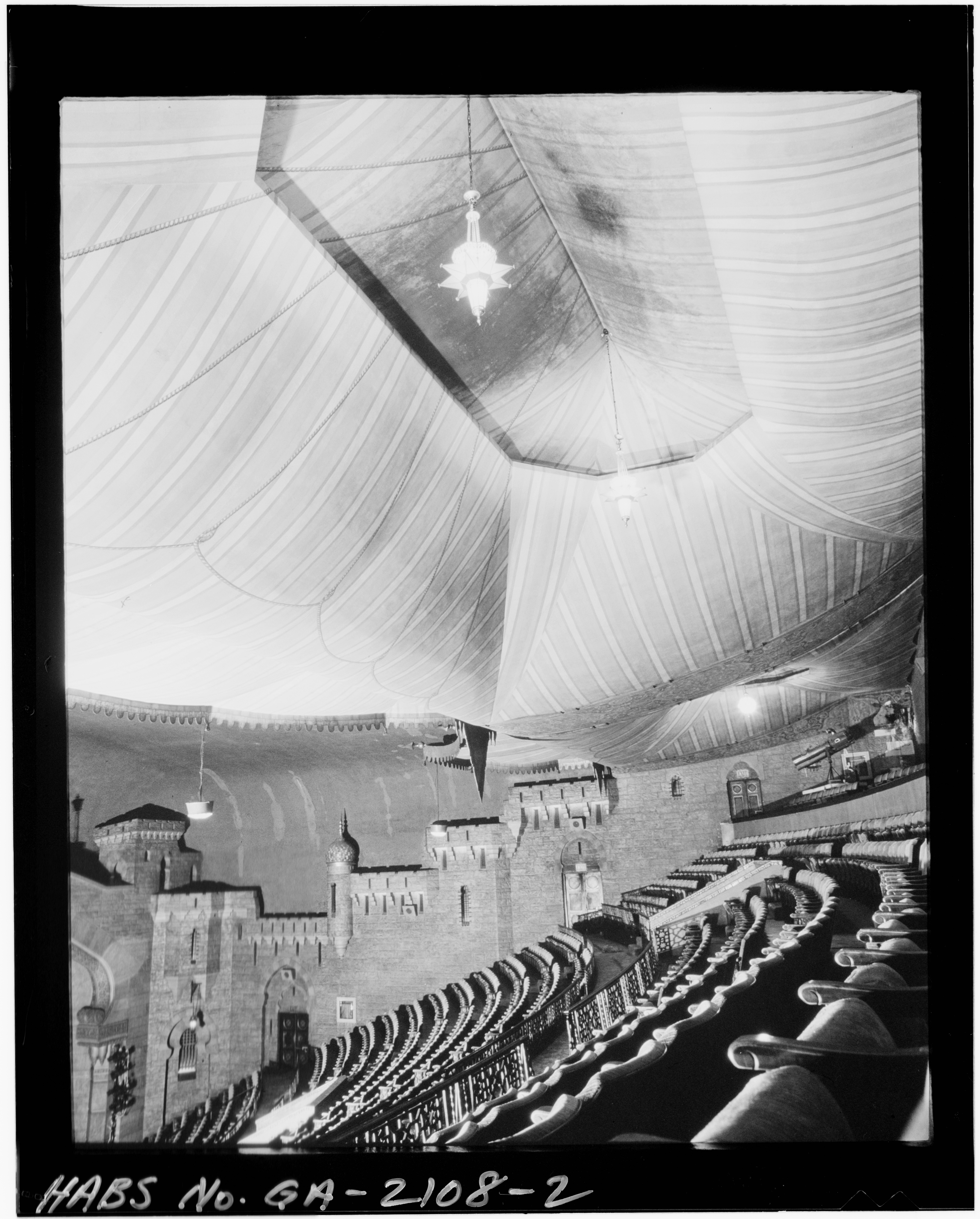
Interior of the Fox with a view of the canopy ceiling.

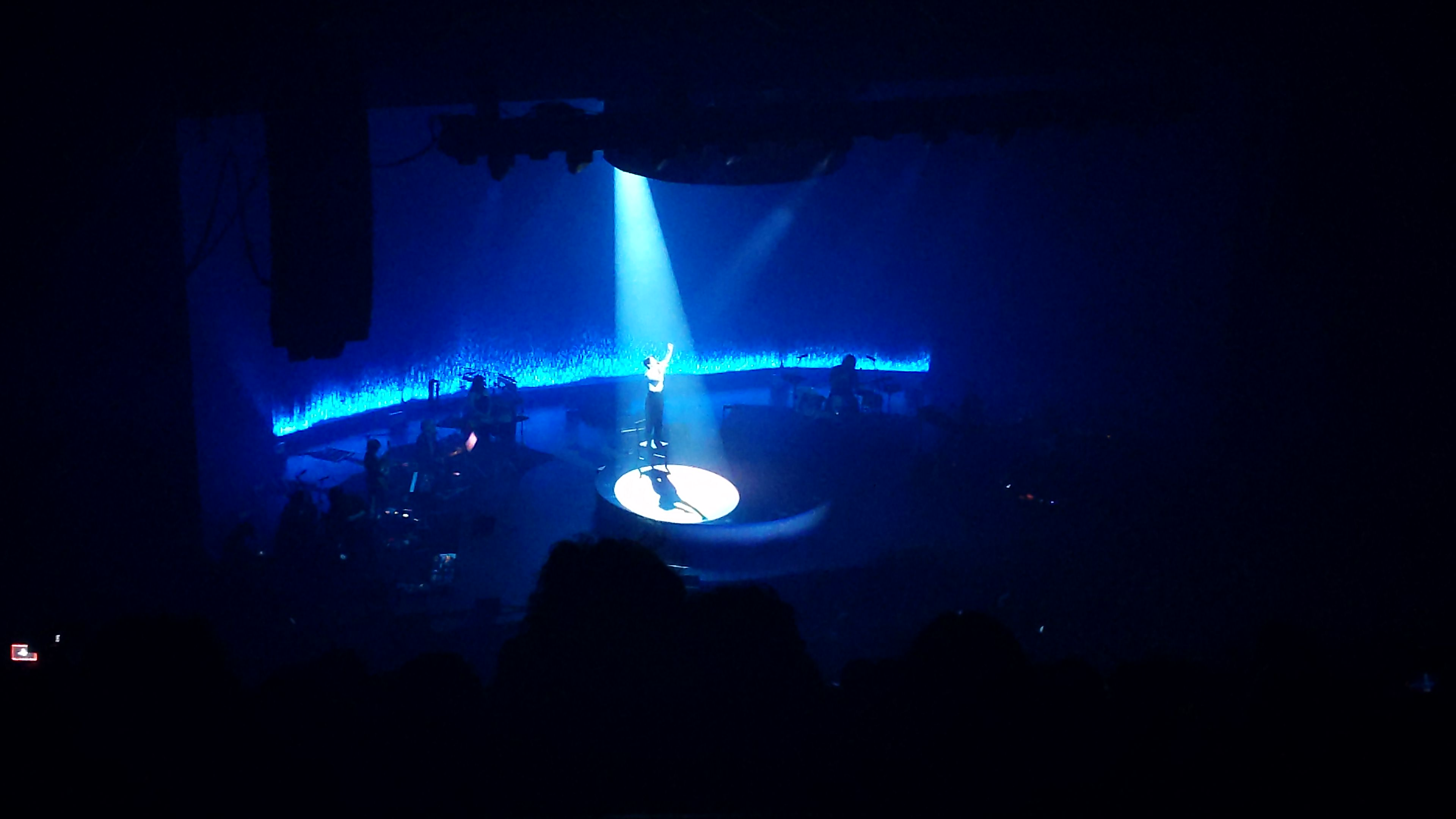
Mitski performing in the theatre in 2024

== See also ==
- Fox Theatre Historic District
- Fox Theatre for a list of other Fox Theatres, past and present, in U.S. cities
- List of National Historic Landmarks in Georgia (U.S. state)
- National Register of Historic Places listings in Fulton County, Georgia
- Shakespeare Tavern
