= Georgian Terrace Hotel =

Hotel in Atlanta, United States

Coordinates: 33.7726°N 84.3846°W

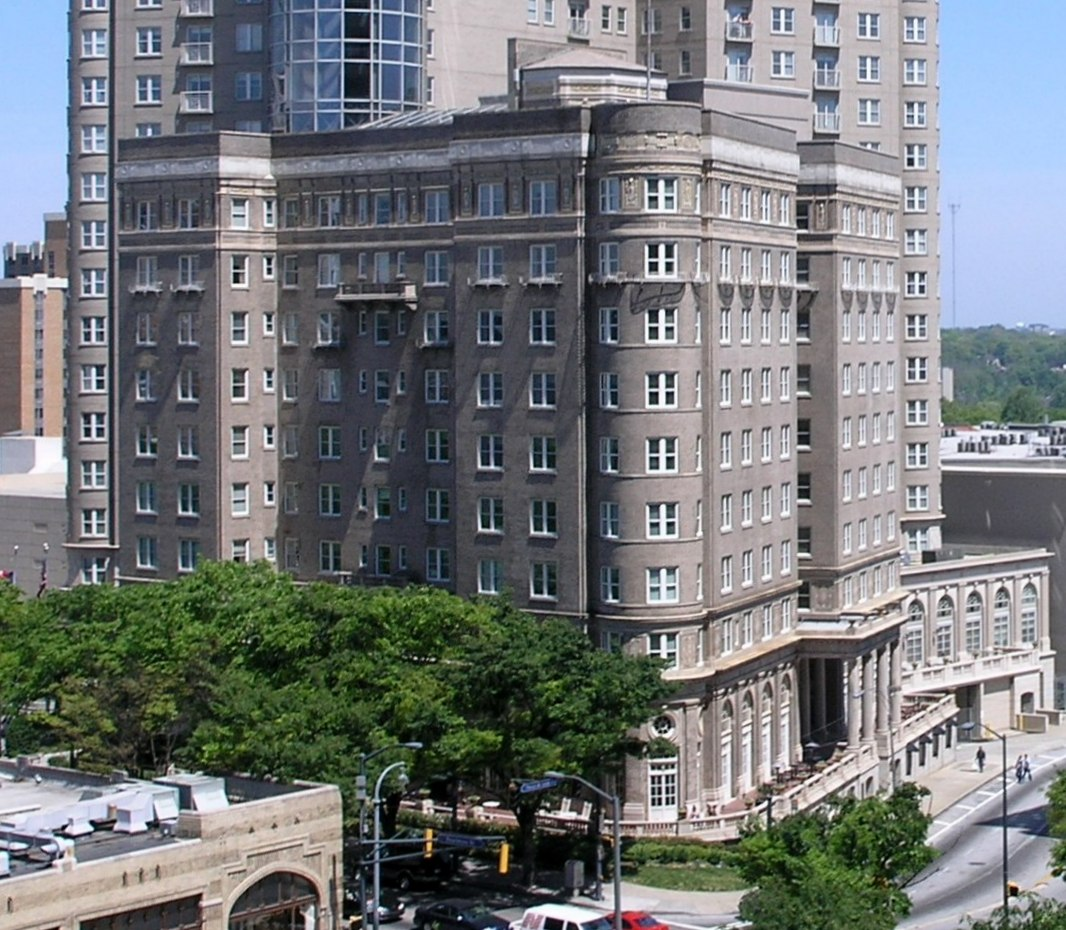
- Georgian Terrace Hotel in 2008
- Interactive map of the Georgian Terrace Hotel area

General information
- Location: 659 Peachtree Street NE, Atlanta
- Opening: 1911 (addition in 1991)
- Owner: Sotherly Hotels
- Operator: OTH Hotels & Resorts

Technical details
- Floor count: 10 stories in 1911; 19-story wing added in 1991

Design and construction
- Architects: Original hotel: William Lee Stoddart; Addition: Smallwood, Reynolds, Stewart, Stewart and Associates
- Developer: Joseph F. Gatins, Jr

Other information
- Number of rooms: 326
- Number of restaurants: 2

Website
- Official site
- Georgian Terrace Hotel
- U.S. Historic district – Contributing property
- Atlanta Landmark Building
- Location within Atlanta
- Architect: William Lee Stoddart
- Architectural style: Moorish Revival, Beaux-Arts style, Renaissance Revival
- Part of: Fox Theatre Historic District (ID78003178)

Significant dates
- Added to NRHP: October 7, 1978
- Designated ALB: June 13, 1990

The Georgian Terrace Hotel in Midtown Atlanta, part of the Fox Theatre Historic District, was designed by architect William Lee Stoddart in a Beaux-Arts style that was intended to evoke the architecture of Paris. Construction commenced on July 21, 1910, and ended on September 8, 1911, and the hotel opened on October 2, 1911. The George C. Fuller Construction Company was contractor, and the developer was Joseph F. Gatins, Jr.

A 19-story wing, designed by Smallwood, Reynolds, Stewart, Stewart and Associates, was added in 1991. A major renovation was completed in 2009.

The Georgian Terrace is a member of Historic Hotels of America, an official program of the National Trust for Historic Preservation.

== Architecture ==
The original 10-story Georgian Terrace Hotel was designed to conform to Atlanta's early trolley rail lines that met at the corner of Peachtree Street and Ponce de Leon Avenue. It was one of the first hotels built outside of the city's downtown business district in a then residential neighborhood, which had been land originally owned by Richard Peters.

At a cost of $500,000, the hotel was built of butter-colored brick, marble, and limestone in the Beaux-Arts style as a Southern interpretation of the Parisian hotel. The hotel features classical architectural details, such as turreted corners, floor-to-ceiling Palladian-styled windows, and wide wrap-around columned terraces. The hotel is largely unadorned until its cornice line, which is embellished by highly-decorative terracotta.

The Peachtree Street façade is composed of a two-story-high window arcade set under a wide cornice supported on narrow pilasters and has a centered portico. The Ponce de Leon Avenue façade features a portico held up by four columns that rest on a rusticated, arcaded base. This portico was used as the Ladies Carriage entrance and provided access to the main hotel; the café terrace, which held exotic plants, tables, and chairs to resemble cafes in Europe; and a lower level of the hotel, which at one time housed the WAKE 1340AM radio station.

Originally, the hotel had a prominent, tile-buttressed, shed roof cornice that was supported by ornamented, paired brackets, but this element was removed in 1945.

The inside of the hotel was decorated with crystal and Italian-bronze chandeliers, white marble columns, ornate pilasters, paneled walls, elliptical staircases, and Italian-tiled floors. In addition to guest rooms, the hotel housed the Winter Garden, the Terrace Garden Lounging Room, which was almost entirely enclosed in glass, the Terrace Restaurant Grill Room, general management offices, an elevator, telephone booths, a curio booth, an "oak-mission" decorated Rathskeller, barber shops, a manicure parlor, and an ornate ballroom that was the setting for the 1939 Gone with the Wind Gala.

All of the hotel's original furniture and interior furnishings were from M. Rich and Brothers Co., later Rich's.

== History ==
On October 2, 1911, thousands of guests from Atlanta and other cities attended the opening night ceremonies of the Georgian Terrace Hotel, where they were entertained by a costumed-Spanish orchestra performing in the Grand Ballroom. Immediately, guests and the press dubbed the hotel as a "distinct step forward in Southern hoteldom" and a "Parisian hotel on a noted boulevard in a metropolitan city". Over subsequent decades, the hotel would be referred to as the "Grand Old Lady of Peachtree".

Since its opening, the hotel has been the place for numerous historical events and housed several prominent guests, including Clark Gable, Tallulah Bankhead, Calvin Coolidge, John J. Pershing, Walt Disney, and F. Scott Fitzgerald.

Starting in 1913, famous Italian tenor Enrico Caruso along with members of The Metropolitan Opera used the hotel as their Atlanta headquarters when they came yearly to the city to perform in spring concerts. Once the Fox Theatre opened across the street from the hotel in 1929, traffic on Peachtree Street would be stopped and a red carpet rolled from the door of the hotel to the theatre entrance, allowing the opera stars and other celebrities staying at the hotel to make a grand entrance into the theatre before their shows started.

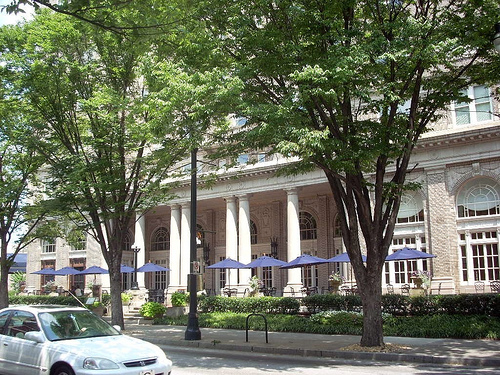
Historic front entrance

In the 1920s, Arthur Murray, who was then a student at Georgia Tech, started teaching dance classes in the hotel's Grand Ballroom. This enterprise eventually spawned his franchised-branded dance lesson business. In 1926, Georgia's chief investigator for the Solicitor General, Bert Donaldson, was murdered at the hotel. It was thought that this planned "hit" was evidence of Atlanta's underworld connections to organized crime.

In 1935, Macmillan editor Harold Latham decided to stay at the hotel while scouting the Atlanta area for new writers and manuscripts. While in town, he met Peggy Mitchell Marsh, whom he was introduced to through a mutual acquaintance. This mutual acquaintance also had told Latham that Marsh had written a novel about Atlanta during the American Civil War and Reconstruction. After several failed attempts to obtain the manuscript from Marsh, Latham finally succeeded in getting it from her in the lobby of the hotel as he was about to depart for New Orleans. Upon handing the manuscript to Latham, Marsh said, "If you really want it you may take it, but it is incomplete and unrevised." That unfinished novel was completed and published in 1936 as Gone with the Wind, winning the Pulitzer Prize in 1937. While she insisted on using her married name socially, the book was published under her maiden name of Margaret Mitchell.

On December 15, 1939, the Georgian Terrace Hotel's Grand Ballroom was the site of the Gone with the Wind Gala, whose attendees included Clark Gable, Carole Lombard, Vivien Leigh, Laurence Olivier, Olivia de Havilland, Claudette Colbert, Victor Fleming, Louis B. Mayer, David O. Selznick, Margaret Mitchell, and several other notable guests.

The premiere of Gone with the Wind was in Atlanta in 1939. All of the stars and the Director of the movie (with the exception of Vivien Leigh and her lover at the time, Laurence Olivier) stayed at the Georgian Terrace. The pre-premiere party was held at the hotel.

Contrary to popular belief, the premier showing of Gone With the Wind was not held at the Fox Theatre, but rather at Loew's Grand Theatre in downtown Atlanta. After the movie was screened there, its stars were ushered to the Georgian Terrace via a motorcade through a parade route on Peachtree Street.

During the premiere of Song of the South, which did take place at the Fox Theatre, Walt Disney stayed at the hotel. He returned to his room before the film started; unexpected audience reactions of any kind upset him and he preferred not to watch it with the audience.

The Georgian Terrace Hotel saw quite a few changes in the 1940s. It had become a residential hotel in 1945 and had been modernized with air-conditioning, new plumbing, and some interior changes. In 1945, the prominent tile-buttressed, shed roof cornice was removed.

During the 1970s, the Grand Ballroom was turned into the Electric Ballroom by concert promoters Alex Cooley and Mark Golob. Musical performers providing concerts at the hotel included Billy Joel, Fleetwood Mac, Patti Smith, and Bruce Springsteen. The 1974 film Cockfighter, starring Warren Oates, features some scenes that were shot at the Georgian Terrace.

By 1981, revenues were in steady decline and the hotel closed its doors for the first time in its 70-year history. By the middle of that decade, the hotel had been boarded up and condemned. In 1986, however, the hotel was listed as a part of the "Fox Theatre District" on the National Register of Historic Places, which successfully blocked plans for its demolition.

The 1990s saw a rebirth of the hotel. In 1991, the hotel was converted into a luxury apartment building, and a new 19-story wing complete with a rooftop pool was built to resemble the original 10-story Beaux-Arts-style hotel. In 1997, the apartments were vacated, and the property reopened as a luxury hotel.

The first decade of the 21st century saw two major renovations done at the hotel, one in 2000 and one in 2009, which included the opening of Livingston's Restaurant and Bar and Mims Café, both named after early Atlanta Mayor Livingston Mims, who had built his house in 1879 on the corner where the hotel now stands.

In April 2007, the hotel was used by Robert Rodriguez to film a Bacardi Global Brands commercial for the European market titled El Toro. This commercial starred George Clooney, Jamie King, and Leonor Varela.

In the fall of 2010, the Georgian Terrace's Grand Ballroom was used as a filming location for the Jason Bateman and Ryan Reynolds film The Change-Up. In the film, the ballroom doubles as Plantation Oaks Country Club.

== See also ==
- National Register of Historic Places listings in Fulton County, Georgia
- Hotels in Atlanta
