= Andrew Wales =

Andrew Wales (1737–1799) was an American brewer. As the first commercial brewer in Alexandria, Virginia, Wales also became the first commercial brewer in the District of Columbia after Alexandria's 1791 incorporation into the District. Wales served as brewmaster at John Mercer's Marlborough Brewery in Stafford County, Virginia before opening his own Alexandria brewery in 1770. George Washington frequently purchased beer and barley from Wales over the course of thirty years.

== Early professional life ==
Andrew Wales was born in Scotland in about 1737. He arrived in the Colonies before 1765 and held a position in John Mercer's Marlborough Brewery from 1765 to 1769. He rose to the position of brewmaster after a previous brewmaster failed to produce quality beer. Washington purchased a cask of Wales' beer from the Marlborough Brewery in 1768 and would remain a customer of Wales' for thirty years. Mercer wrote in a 1767 letter that, “Wales affirmed that he had some years the charge of a brewhouse at Edinburgh.”

== Wales Brewery ==
Wales rented space in Alexandria's Town Warehouse on Duke Street and began brewing there commercially in 1770. Within two years, Wales purchased a building to house his brewery, but did not fully relocate brewery operations until 1773. After this second brewing site burned down in 1788, he moved it a block closer to the waterfront.

Cornelius Coningham, the first brewer in the City of Washington, took control of the Wales Brewery in 1798, renaming it the Alexandria Brewery. Coningham held the brewery for Wales until a new owner was found. The brewery complex was purchased by John Fitzgerald in 1798, but was sold in 1802 to settle Fitzgerald's debts after his death in 1799.

The brewery complex no longer exists. Remnants of the Town Warehouse, where Wales rented space for his first brewery, were found in November 2015 during construction of a new hotel.
