= Hotel Indigo =

Hotel chain

Hotel Indigo by IHG
- Type: Subsidiary
- Industry: Hotel
- Founded: 2004
- Number of locations: 156 hotels (2024)
- Areas served: Worldwide
- Parent: IHG Hotels & Resorts
- Website: www.hotelindigo.com

Hotel Indigo by IHG is a global brand group of small, individually owned boutique hotels, which is part of IHG Hotels & Resorts (InterContinental Hotels Group). As of June 2024, it has 156 hotels with over 20,000 rooms worldwide, and has stated that it plans to open more than 150 further hotels.

== History ==
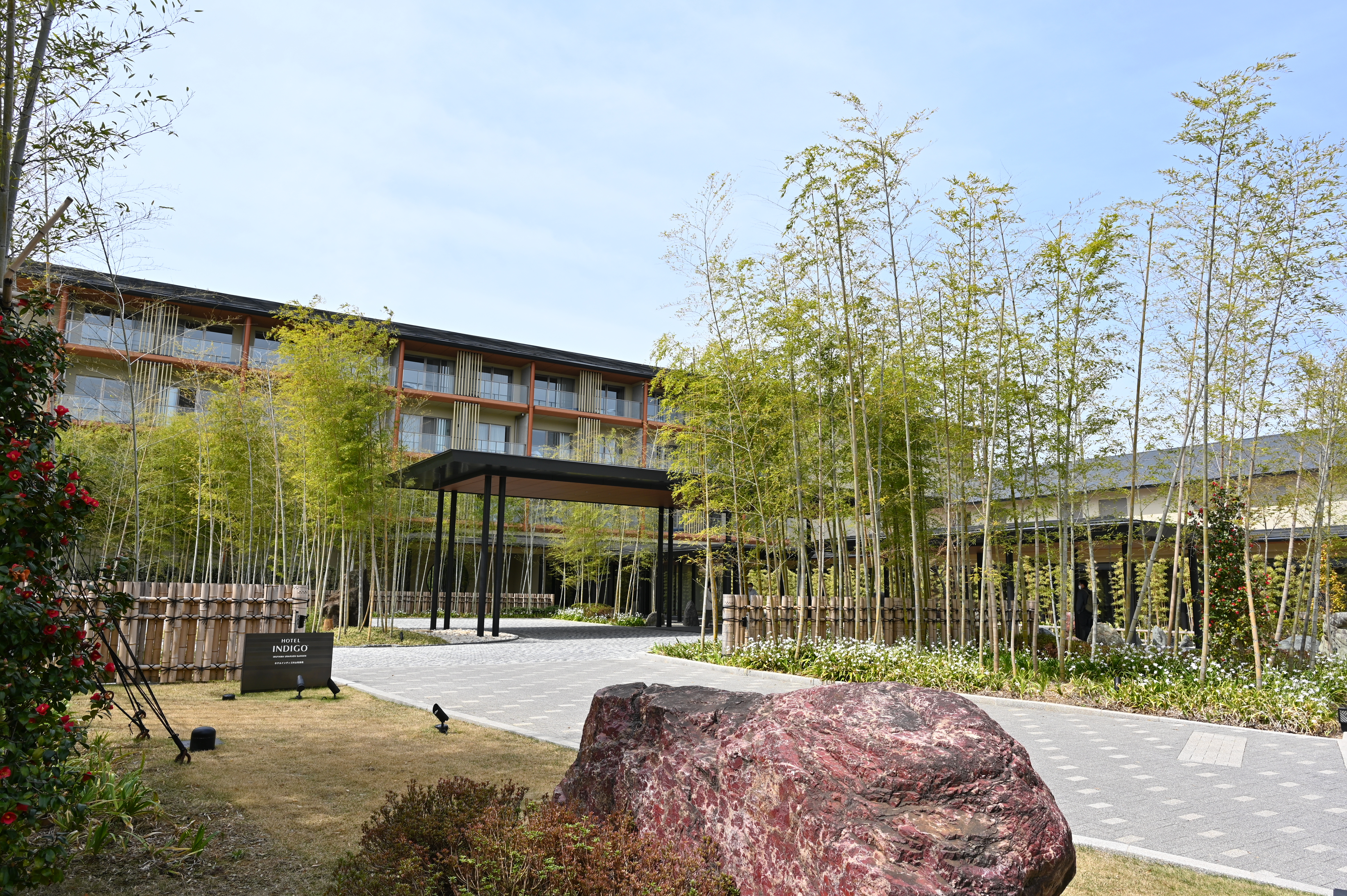
Hotel Indigo in Inuyama, Japan

The first Hotel Indigo opened in Atlanta, Georgia, United States, in October 2004 and a second location opened in the historic Gold Coast neighborhood of Chicago, Illinois, in May 2005 (later being foreclosed and re-branding as the Claridge House). The chain's first non-US property, which in 2017 became the independent Metcalfe Hotel, was opened in Ottawa, Ontario, Canada.

== Properties ==
=== Asia Pacific ===
- Hotel Indigo Hong Kong Island
- Hotel Indigo Singapore Katong
- Hotel Indigo Taipei North
- Hotel Indigo Jabal alakhdhar Oman
- Hotel Indigo Bali Seminyak Beach
- Hotel Indigo Bintan Lagoi Beach
- Hotel Indigo Bandung Dago Pakar

=== ANZAC ===
- Hotel Indigo Adelaide Markets
- Hotel Indigo Brisbane City Centre
- Hotel Indigo Melbourne Little Collins
- Hotel Indigo Melbourne on Flinders
- Hotel Indigo Sydney Potts Point
- Hotel Indigo Auckland
- Hotel Indigo Indigo Palau

=== Eastern Caribbean ===
- Hotel Indigo Hastings, Barbados.

=== Europe ===
- Hotel Indigo Antwerp
- Hotel Indigo Berlin
- Hotel Indigo Durham
- Hotel Indigo Edinburgh
- Hotel Indigo Exeter
- Hotel Indigo Leicester Square, London
- Hotel Indigo Manchester Victoria Station
- Hotel Indigo Stratford-upon-Avon
- Indigo Hotel Warsaw

=== North America ===
- Hotel Indigo Atlanta Midtown
- Hotel Indigo Dallas Downtown
- Hotel Indigo Los Angeles Downtown
- Hotel Indigo Madison Downtown
- Hotel Indigo Newark Downtown/Indigo Residence
- Hotel Indigo Spokane Downtown
- Hotel Indigo Detroit Downtown
- Hotel Indigo Traverse City
- Hotel Indigo Jacksonville-Deerwood Park
