= Poinsett Hotel =

- U.S. National Register of Historic Places
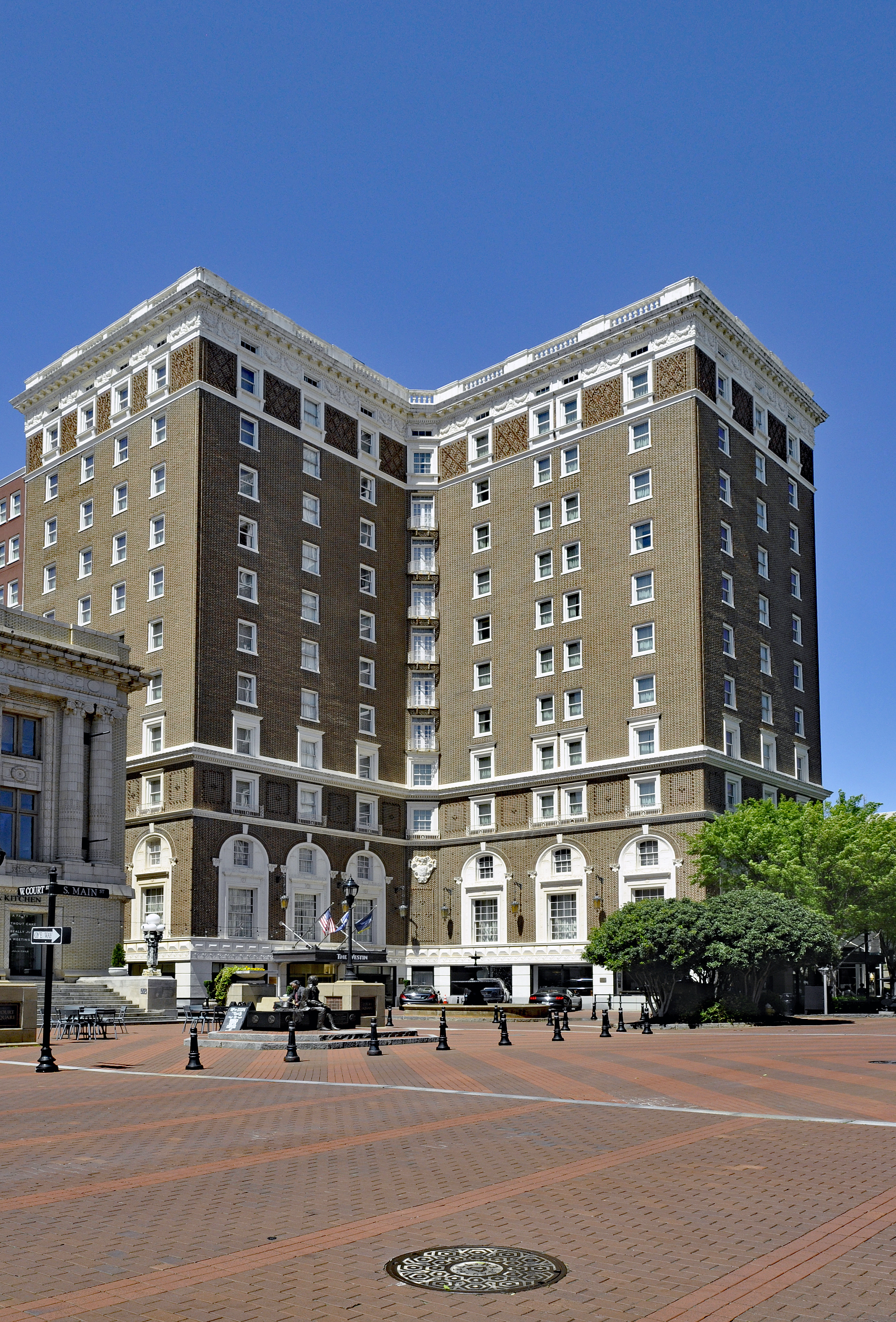

- Location within South Carolina Location within the United States
- Location: 120 South Main Street, Greenville, South Carolina
- Coordinates: 34°50′56″N 82°24′01″W
- Area: .86 acres (0.35 ha)
- Built: 1925
- Architect: William Lee Stoddart
- Architectural style: Beaux-Arts; Skyscraper
- MPS: Greenville MRA
- NRHP reference No.: 82003863
- Added to NRHP: July 1, 1982

The Westin Poinsett Greenville, is a historic twelve-story landmark hotel in downtown Greenville, South Carolina, opened in 1925 as one of the first skyscrapers in Greenville. In 1982, the Poinsett was listed on the National Register of Historic Places. The hotel is a member of Historic Hotels of America, an organization sponsored by the National Trust for Historic Preservation intended to promote heritage tourism.

== History ==
The Poinsett Hotel was built at the end of an era during which small Southern cities demanded quality hotels to attract business travelers and symbolize their new urban status. It was conceived, in part, to accommodate visitors to a biennial Southern Textile Exhibit held in Greenville. The Mansion House, a hotel built in 1824, was razed and a larger building was designed for its Main Street location by noted New York architect William Lee Stoddart. To help raise money for the project, local businessmen, led by textile magnate John T. Woodside (1864-1946), sold $100 shares of stock to 1,700 local residents. The hotel was named for Joel R. Poinsett, a South Carolinian who had served as Secretary of War under President Millard Fillmore and as the first U.S. Minister to Mexico. Poinsett introduced the eponymous Christmas plant to the United States from Mexico in 1825. It was typical of the era to name hotels after local notables. Other Stoddart hotels were named for Sir Walter Raleigh, Virginia Dare, Lord Baltimore, George Washington, George Mason, Patrick Henry, Daniel Boone, and O. Henry. Groundbreaking occurred in May 1924; and the $1.5 million Poinsett Hotel opened in June 1925.

The hotel lost $30,000 in its first year of operation and never turned a profit in its first five years, but it prospered during the latter years of the Depression under the management of J. Mason Alexander (1895-1980), who successfully brought the hotel through receivership. In 1946, the Poinsett was named the best medium-sized hotel in the nation. Alexander conducted daily white glove inspections, had guests given change only in only new bills or freshly washed coins, and required service staff to memorize the names of visitors. Alexander's head chef came from Paris via New York, as did his German pastry cook. Sixty rooms were added in 1941, bringing the total to 248. In 1941, thirty of the hotel's 200 employees had served there for more than ten years.

As the number of private automobiles increased during the 1950s, city hotels in the urban core lost business to motels on major highways. In 1959, the Poinsett was sold to Jack Tar Hotels. Its profitability declined despite 1964 renovations that included new wiring, 70 new telephones, ice machines, and a swimming pool on the roof of the parking garage. Ownership changed hands several times in the 1970s and 1980s. Beginning in 1977, James C. Bible (1924-1991) tried to operate the hotel as residence suites for retirees, but he was perpetually at odds with city government over fire code violations. The city finally closed the hotel in January 1987. In the late 1980s, Bible and his wife Ann were divorced, and she eventually gained possession of the hotel. During the next decade, the abandoned building was repeatedly vandalized, and intruders set two fires. The hotel was considered one of the most endangered historic structures in South Carolina.

Downtown Greenville was revitalized during the administration of Mayor Knox H. White. In November 1997, Steve Dopp and Greg Lenox, developers of the Francis Marion Hotel in Charleston (also designed by William Stoddart), purchased the Poinsett and acquired a franchise from Westin Hotels & Resorts. The project received about $4 million in tax dollars, and Federal Historic Rehabilitation Tax Credits were awarded as part of an approximately $20 million restoration. The Westin Poinsett reopened on October 22, 2000. In 2014, tripadvisor.com ranked the Poinsett first among 63 Greenville hotels. A decade after the grand reopening, Knox White said that saving the Poinsett "was key to so much further growth of Greenville....People began to realize that redevelopment and historic preservation could happen, and it didn't just mean bulldoze and build modern."

In April 2026, the hotel was sold by GLC L.P. SC Ltd Partnership to Birmingham, Alabama-based Highline Hospitality Partners.

== See also ==
- List of Historic Hotels of America
