= Midtown Plaza =

Midtown Plaza may refer to:

- Midtown Plaza (Rochester), a defunct shopping mall in Rochester, New York, United States
- Midtown Plaza (Saskatoon), a shopping mall in Saskatoon, Saskatchewan, Canada
- Johnston Building (Charlotte, North Carolina), also known as the Midtown Plaza
