= Jack Tar Hotels =

American-based international chain (1940–1997)

Jack Tar Hotels was an international hotel chain founded in 1940 and based in the United States. They were sold in 1997 to Allegro Resorts.

== History ==
The chain began with a single motel in Galveston, Texas, overlooking the Gulf of Mexico, built in 1940 by W. L. Moody III, the chairman of Affiliated National Hotels. The “Jack Tar” name (a slang term for a sailor) was chosen as the result of a naming contest. In 1949, the facility was renovated by architect Thomas M. Price, who established an office in Galveston after World War II. Price graduated from the Harvard Graduate School of Design, studying under Walter Gropius and Marcel Breuer. This property was purchased in 1952 by Dallas insurance executive Charles Sammons, who acquired the rights to the Jack Tar name and launched an expansion project, opening several properties nationwide. These properties were known for their modernist curtain wall architecture with most designed by Price.

In 1997, the Jack Tar properties were sold to Allegro Resorts Corporation. The sale included ownership of a resort and casino in Puerto Plata, Dominican Republic, and assumption of two leases for resorts in Montego Bay, Jamaica, and Cancun, Mexico. Allegro also acquired management contracts for two resorts in Guanacaste Province, Costa Rica, and a marketing and franchise agreement for a St. Kitts resort."

== San Francisco, California ==
A 400-room Jack Tar Hotel in San Francisco occupied a full city block at the intersection of Geary Boulevard and Van Ness Avenue. When built in 1960, it was considered one of the most luxurious hotels in the city, although it was criticized by Herb Caen and others for its modern architecture, which they considered ugly (modernist architecture did not come to dominate downtown San Francisco until the 1970s). Part of the movie The Conversation takes place there.

The pentecostal evangelist A. A. Allen died at this hotel in 1970. In 1973, the jury in the trial of Ruchell Magee was sequestered at the Jack Tar Hotel. In June 1979, NASA held a workshop on aircraft safety which initiated crew resource management.

In 1982, after major renovations, it became the Cathedral Hill Hotel. A major fire occurred in December 1983, causing the hotel to rebuild again. The hotel finally closed on October 30, 2009 and was demolished in November 2013 to make way for an expansion of California Pacific Medical Center.

== Clearwater, Florida ==
There once was a Jack Tar Hotel in Clearwater, Florida. Tommy John, who stayed there in 1961, described it as "then one of the classiest hotels on Florida's west coast."

== Durham, North Carolina ==
The former Jack Tar Motor Lodge in Durham, North Carolina was renovated and reopened as the first property in the Dream Hotel Group's new Unscripted Hotels brand. The renovated hotel has 74 rooms, a pool deck on the third floor, and restaurants on the ground floor. Unscripted Durham opened July 20, 2017.

== Galveston, Texas ==
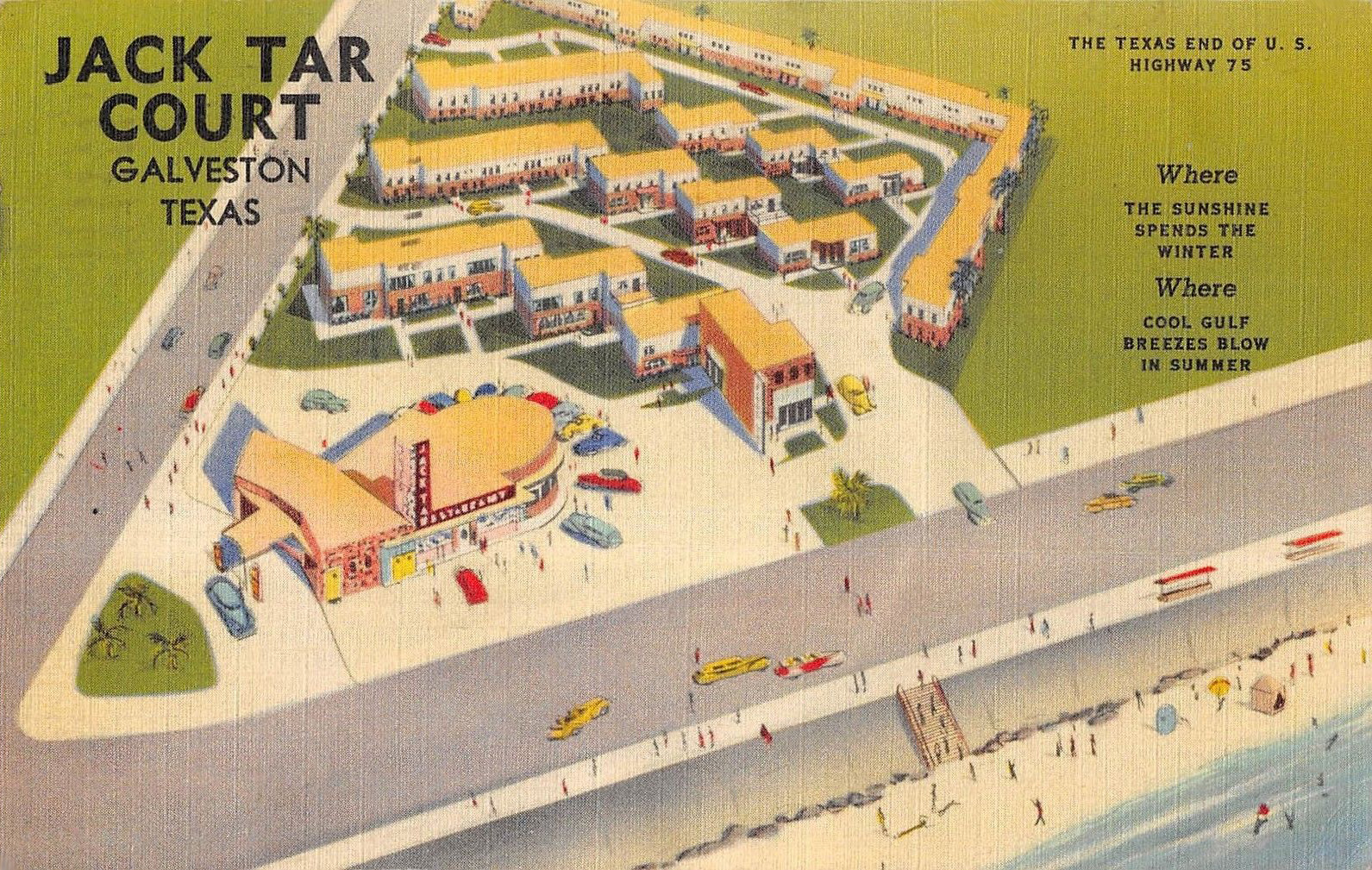
Jack Tar Galveston

There was a 225-room Jack Tar Hotel in Galveston, Texas, as described above. It was located at the intersection of Seawall Boulevard and Broadway.

== Orange, Texas ==
There was a Jack Tar Hotel in Orange, Texas on the corner of N 5th Street and W Division Ave in downtown. The popular hotel, built in the 1950s, featured a barbershop, ballroom, stores and a restaurant famous for its prime rib. Behind the building was a garden terrace area with shaded tables and a swimming pool. The Orange location was also base of operations for water events such as the Aqua Demons and Debs ski shows in the 1950s. The hotel eventually became home to a number of retirement centers, the last of which closed in 2006. The building was demolished in 2011.

== Lansing, Michigan ==
Originally opened in 1926 as the Hotel Olds, built and operated by the Lansing Community Hotel Corporation which included R.E. Olds, the Jack Tar hotel chain purchased the property at 111 South Capitol Avenue in 1960 and renamed it "Jack Tar Lansing." In 1970, the hotel was renamed the Olds Plaza following a sale to an Alma, Michigan oil businessman and subsequent renovation. In 1974, however, a different Alma-based layer and entrepreneur purchased the property and renamed it again to The Plaza Hotel. Some of the hotel was converted to offices and meeting space was reduced. It became part of the TravelLodge chain in 1983 when the number of hotel rooms was at 100, down from 400 at its peak. The now-debt-ridden hotel was foreclosed on in 1985, long-term residents were evicted and the hotel closed. The building was sold to the State of Michigan in 1988, completely gutted and renovated by Hobbs & Black Associates into state offices as the George W. Romney Building and now houses the Office of the Governor and other state offices.

== Greenville, South Carolina ==
There was a Jack Tar Hotel in Greenville, South Carolina. It was originally called the "Poinsett Hotel" and was changed to "Jack Tar Poinsett" when it became part of the chain in 1959.
