= Malcolm Parcell =

American artist (1896–1987)

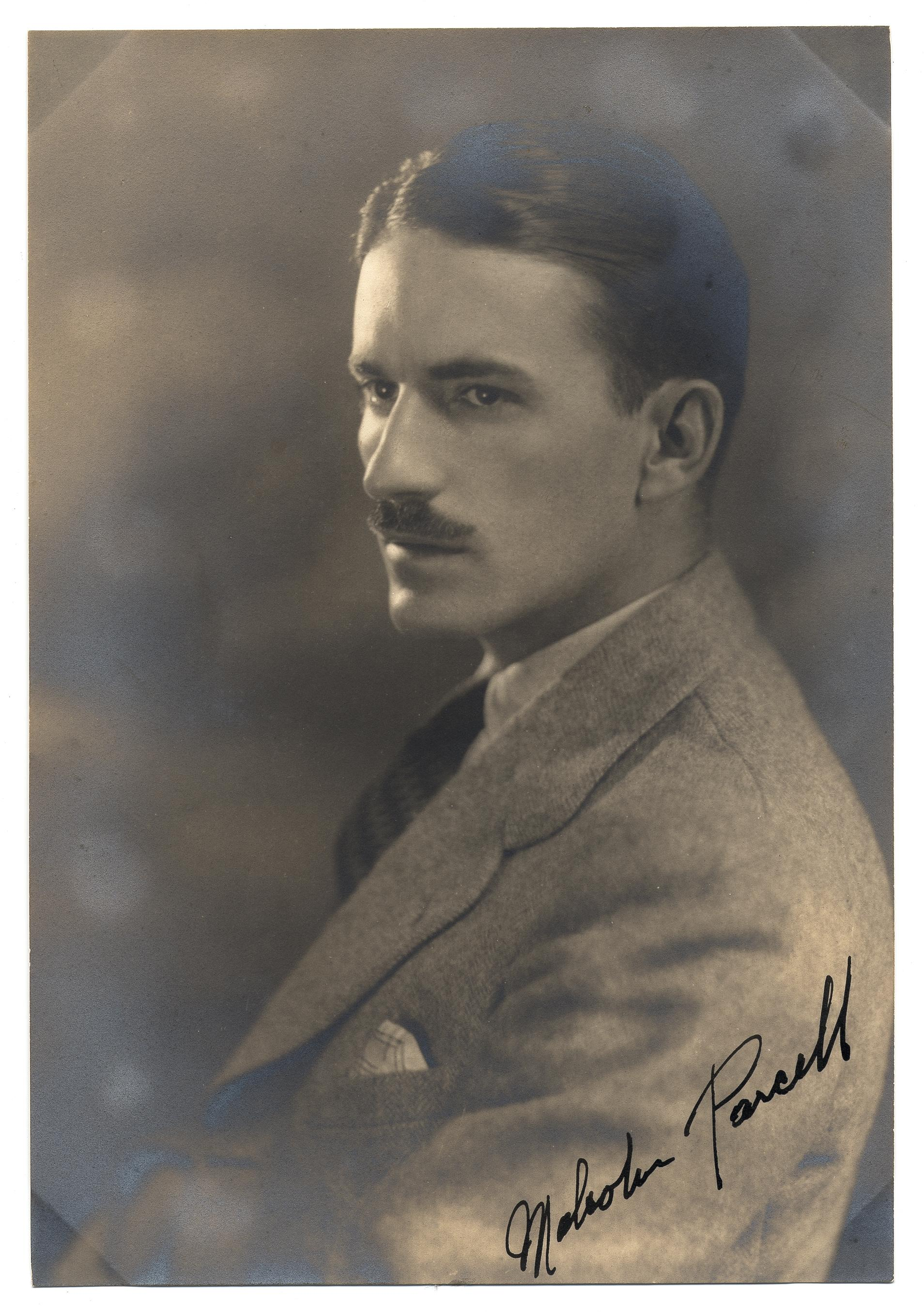

Malcolm Stevens Parcell (January 1, 1896 – March 25, 1987) was an American artist who won the 1925 Carnegie Prize.

== Biography ==
He was born on January 1, 1896, in Claysville, Pennsylvania to a Baptist minister and later attended Carnegie Institute of Technology. He was known for landscapes and portraits. Six of his murals grace the walls of the Pioneer Room at the George Washington Hotel in Washington, Pennsylvania. In 1937 he married Helen Louise Gallagher (1897–1984), a school teacher who had modelled for many of his paintings. His brother, Evans Parcell, was a magazine illustrator. He died on March 25, 1987.

Parcell lived and worked at a home -- Moon Lorn -- in Prosperity, Pennsylvania for 62 years.

Art Studio of Malcolm Parcell

Home of Malcolm Parcell

Built on the site of a log cabin that he had played in as a child, Parcell began additional construction at that location in 1925 and continued adding rooms until his death. In 2017 the property was identified as an endangered historic property because it had fallen into disrepair. Moon Lorn has since become privately owned and restored, and is occasionally open to the public.
