= The George Washington Hotel (Pennsylvania) =

Commercial building in Pennsylvania, United States

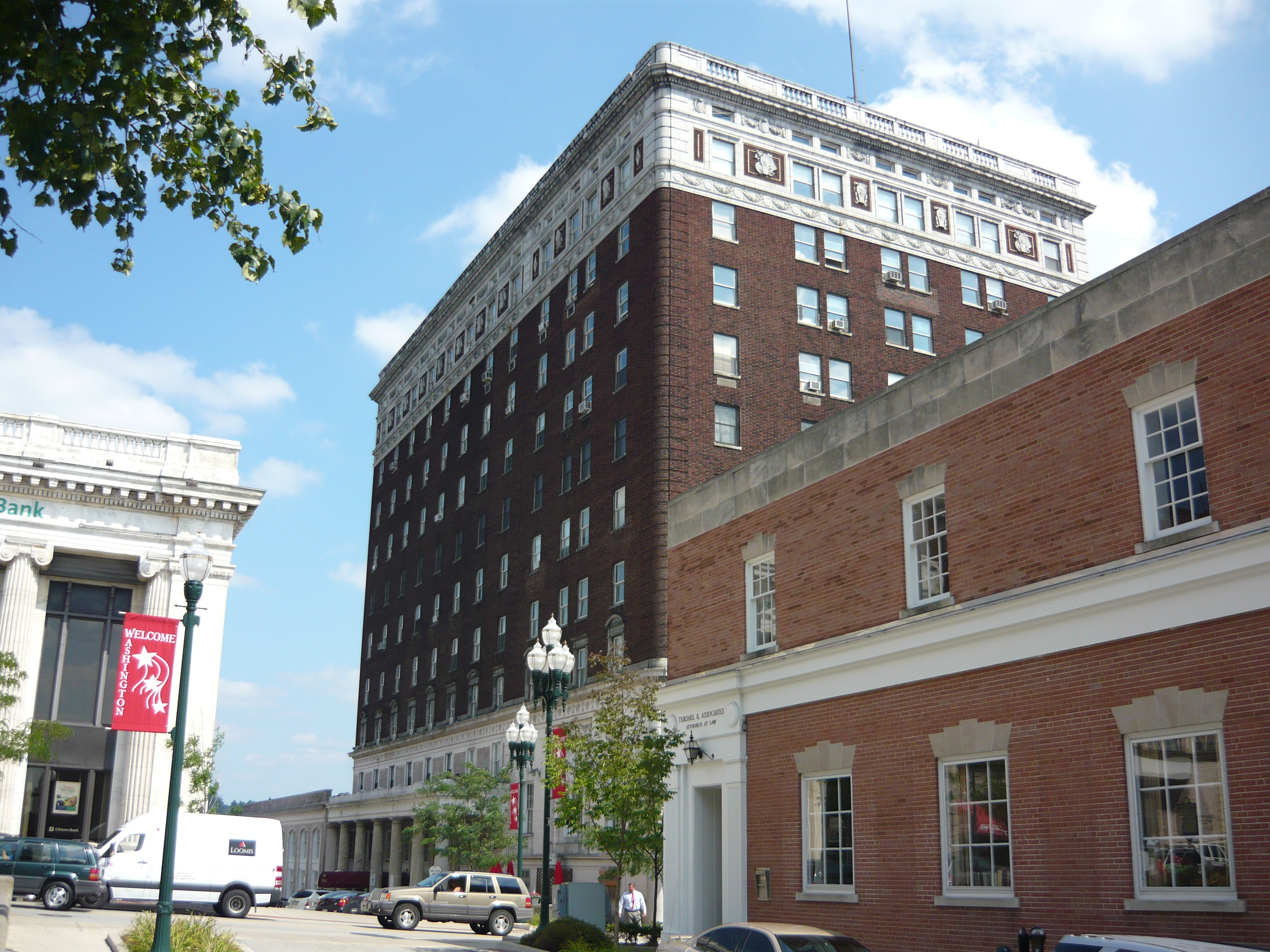
- The George Washington Hotel in Washington, Pennsylvania
- Interactive map of the The George Washington Hotel area

General information
- Type: Commercial
- Location: Washington, Pennsylvania, U.S.
- Coordinates: 40°10′11.4″N 80°14′40.9″W
- Completed: 1923

Design and construction
- Architect: William Lee Stoddart

The George Washington Hotel in Washington, Pennsylvania was designed by renowned architect William Lee Stoddart and built in 1923. Since then, it has been visited by Presidents John F. Kennedy and Harry S. Truman, film star Joan Blondell, big band leader Harry James, and other notable people.

The hotel is also home to the largest remaining mural of early American artist, Malcolm Parcell.

== History and architectural features ==
Local artist Malcolm Parcell created six murals for the George Washington Hotel's Pioneer room. Entitled "Conestoga Wagon," "Pony Express," "Pack Horse," "Stage Coach," "Lafayette visits Washington," and "Bradford's Escape," they depict scenes from the community's history.

Parcell lived Prosperity, Pennsylvania in a small white house he called Moon Lorn.

After the closing of the Hays Hall dormitory at Washington & Jefferson College, the George Washington Hotel served as a residence hall from 1968 to 1971. The College rented the entire 5th and 6th floors. These two floors contained twenty-five rooms each, providing enough housing for the eighty-six former residents of Hayes Hall, the House Mother, and four floor proctors.
