= Independence Building =

- U.S. National Register of Historic Places
- Location within North Carolina Location within the United States
- Location: 100-102 W. Trade St., Charlotte, North Carolina
- Coordinates: 35°13′39″N 80°50′35″W
- Area: 0.2 acres (0.081 ha)
- Built: 1909 J.A. Jones Construction
- Architect: Frank Pierce Milburn; William Lee Stoddart
- Architectural style: Beaux Arts, Renaissance
- Demolished: September 27, 1981
- NRHP reference No.: 78001964
- Added to NRHP: September 18, 1978

The Independence Building was a 186-foot (57 m) high-rise in Charlotte, Mecklenburg County, North Carolina, United States. It was built in 1909 by J.A. Jones Construction and imploded on September 27, 1981 to make way for 101 Independence Center. It originally had 12 floors but 2 more were added in 1928. It was the tallest commercial building in North Carolina, overtaking the title previously held by the Masonic Temple Building in Raleigh. The height of the Independence Building was surpassed by the Jefferson Standard Building in Greensboro in 1923.

== History ==
In July 1905 a group of Charlotte area businessmen including W. H. Belk, C. N. Evans, O. P. Heath, Julian ~. Little and C. M. Patterson together started the companies Charlotte'trust Company and the Charlotte Realty Company. In November 1907 the site was purchased for $92,000. The owners of the site held a major design competition to design the new building, which drew attention from architects across the country. In May 1907 Frank Pierce Milburn was selected.

In January 1908 the previous building, John Irwin House, was destroyed. The construction of the building was attracting a lot of attention from people in Charlotte; in June 1908 the Charlotte Observer noted that pedestrians on the street frequently stopped to observe the building's construction progress from the previous day. This attention can be attributed to the fact that it was North Carolina's first steel frame building. Also, in May 1908 the architect, Frank Pierce Milburn stated the "new 12-story and basement steel-frame skyscraper" was underway in Charlotte, which would be first building of this type and the most expensive office building in the State." To the people of the city, it symbolized the vibrance of the commercial and industrial sectors for Charlotte.

In late 1908 tenants began to occupy the upper floors while the first was finished. In May 1909 the first bank branch opened. The new bank that resulted from the merger of Charlotte Trust Company and Charlotte National Bank, called Charlotte National Bank occupied half of the first floor. Woodall & Sheppard Drug Company occupied the second of the floor. At the time of its opening the building was called the Realty Building.

In May 1912 Julian H. Little, the president of Charlotte National Bank left that bank to form his own bank, Independence Trust Company. This bank leased space in the basement of the building. In 1920 Charlotte National Bank moved out of the building to its new headquarters at 4th and South Tryon. In January 1922 Southern Radio Corporation began leasing the entire 9th floor. In March 1928 the building renovations were complete. The bottom two floors were updated along with an added mezzanine floor that overlooked the first-floor bank. The Charlotte Observer reported that 5,000 people attending the ceremony that marked the completion of the renovations. The Independence Trust Company failed in March 1933.

The last office tenants of the building left in April 1976. The lobby doors were locked and the only remaining tenants were street level shops. The building had fallen into a state of disrepair. However, it was structurally sound since it was built so well. Unfortunately, it would have probably cost too much to make the space rentable. The land the building sat on was fair more valuable than the building itself. In a February 1981 Charlotte Observer article it was revealed the reason the city was considering demolishing the building was it would have been unlikely that anyone would spend the money to make it rentable again and future developers would probably not want to develop a building on the open land nearby if the building still existed. In March 1981 Charlotte city council vote to demolish the building. Then in September 1981 the building was imploded after developer Henry Faison purchased it. The building One Independence Center was built on its site and it in opened in 1983.

== See also ==
- List of tallest buildings in Charlotte
- List of Registered Historic Places in North Carolina

Preceded by Unknown	Tallest Building in Charlotte; 1909—1924; 57 m	Succeeded by Johnston Building
