= Citizens National Bank (Evansville, Indiana) =

- U.S. National Register of Historic Places
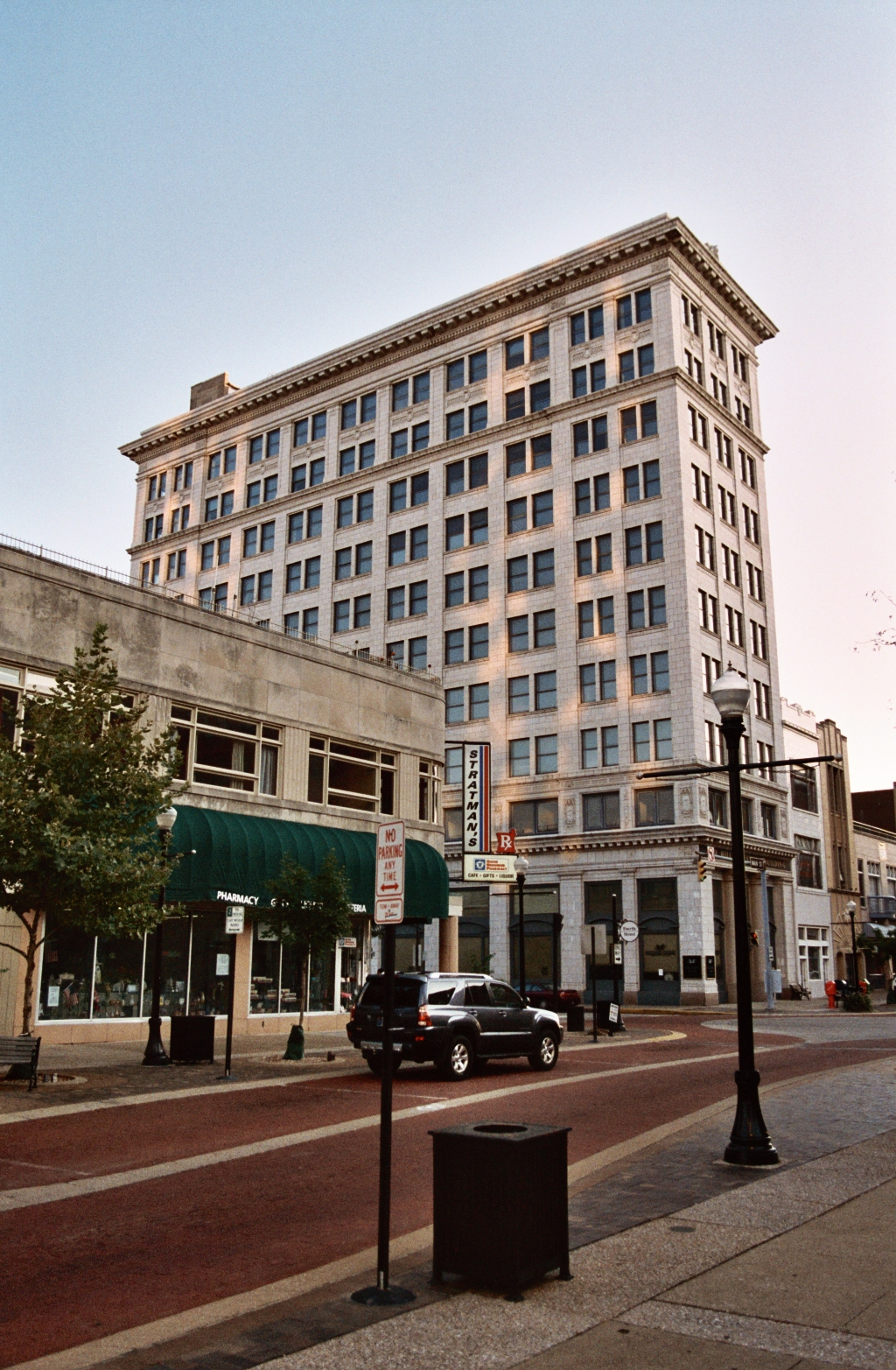
- Side of the bank

- Location within Indiana Location within the United States
- Location: 329 Main Street, Evansville, Indiana
- Coordinates: 37°58′17″N 87°34′17″W
- Area: less than one acre
- Built: 1916
- Architect: William Lee Stoddart
- Architectural style: Skyscraper
- MPS: Downtown Evansville MRA
- NRHP reference No.: 82000087
- Added to NRHP: July 1, 1982

Citizens National Bank, since known as the Hilliard-Lyons Building and Kunkel Square, is a building noted for its stone and terracotta facade, located at Fourth and Main Street in downtown Evansville, Indiana. The building is ten stories tall and was the region's first skyscraper. The architect was William Lee Stoddart. It officially opened on Washington's birthday in 1916. In 2011 the building was converted to 46 luxury apartments.

It was listed on the National Register of Historic Places in 1982.
