= George W. Romney Building =

Building

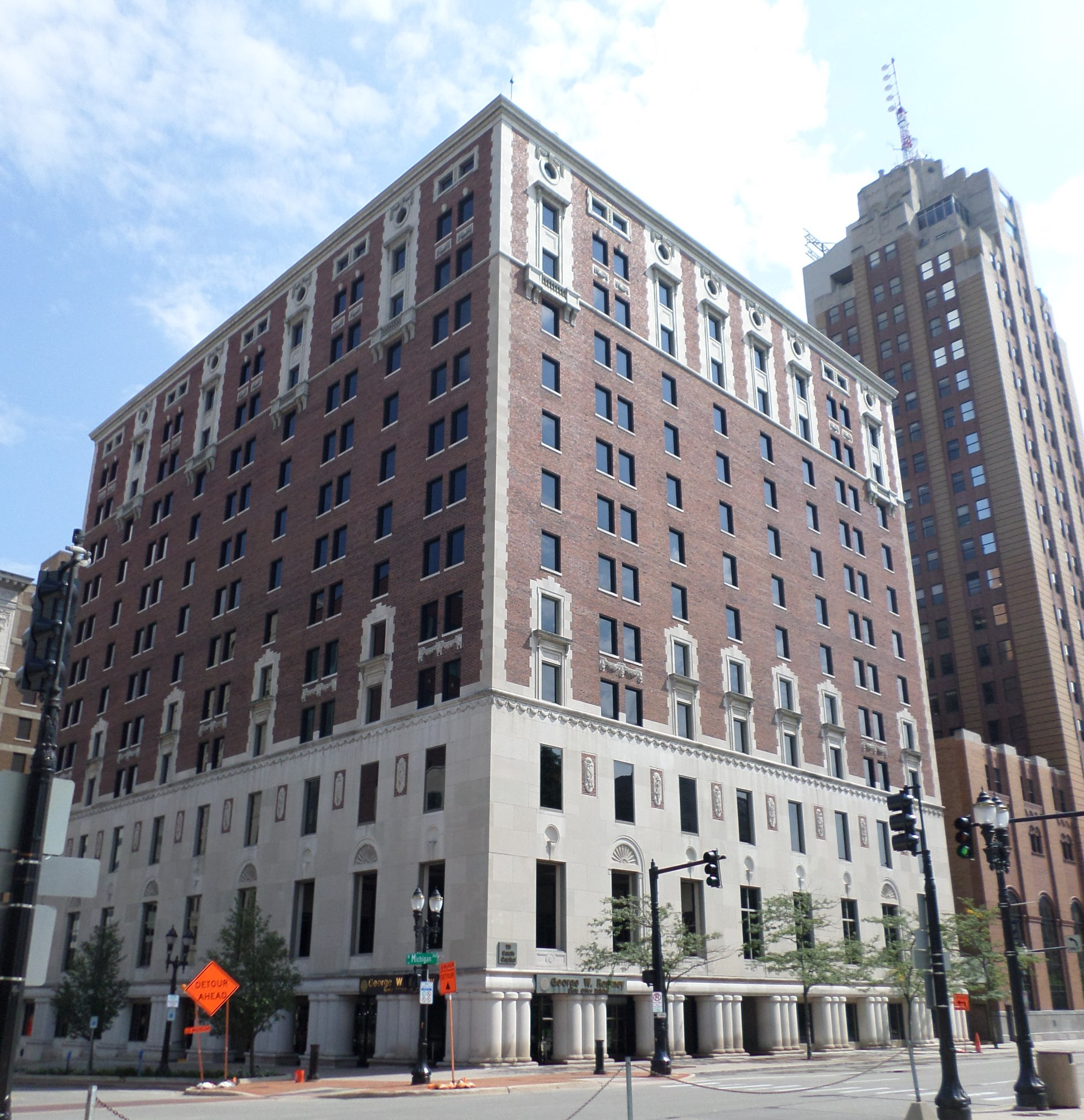
- The building in September 2015
- Interactive map of the George W. Romney Building area

General information
- Type: Government office
- Location: 111 South Capitol Avenue, Lansing, MI, United States
- Coordinates: 42.73325°N 84.55363°W
- Construction started: 1925
- Completed: 1926

Height
- Antenna spire: 50.3 m (165 ft)
- Roof: 48.2 m (158 ft)

Technical details
- Floor count: 13 above ground & 1 underground
- Floor area: 30,658 m^{2} (330,000 sq ft)

The George W. Romney Building - ("The Romney Building") is the Governor of Michigan's main office, and houses other State of Michigan offices. The building, formerly a hotel, is named after George W. Romney, the 43rd Governor and father of Mitt Romney. The building has a ten-story atrium, beginning on the fourth floor.

== History ==
The hotel opened in 1926 as the Hotel Olds, built and operated by the Lansing Community Hotel Corporation which included R.E. Olds. Charles Diggs Sr. recounted being denied accommodation at the hotel because he was African American. He authored Diggs Law to combat such discrimination.

The Jack Tar hotel chain purchased the property at 111 South Capitol Avenue in 1960 and renamed it "Jack Tar Lansing." In 1970, the historic thirteen-story limestone and brick structure was renamed the Olds Plaza following a sale to an Alma, Michigan oil businessman and subsequent renovation. In 1974, however, a different Alma-based layer and entrepreneur purchased the property and renamed it again to the Plaza Hotel. Some of the hotel was converted to offices and meeting space was reduced. It became part of the TravelLodge chain in 1983 when the number of hotel rooms was at 100, down from 400 at its peak. The now-debt-ridden hotel was foreclosed on in 1985, long-term residents were evicted and the hotel closed. The building was sold to the State of Michigan in 1988, completely gutted and renovated by Hobbs & Black Associates as the George W. Romney Building and houses the Office of the Governor and other state offices. The renovation included the adaptive reuse of 290,000 square feet (27,000 m^{2}) as well as a 40,000-square-foot (3,700 m^{2}) addition and atrium, and earned the Showcase of Excellence Award from the Construction Association of Michigan in 1992.

A current project for the Romney Building includes the renovation of the brick plaza, new vestibules and entry doors, and the replacement of the second-floor deck.
