= First National Bank of Charleroi =

- U.S. National Register of Historic Places
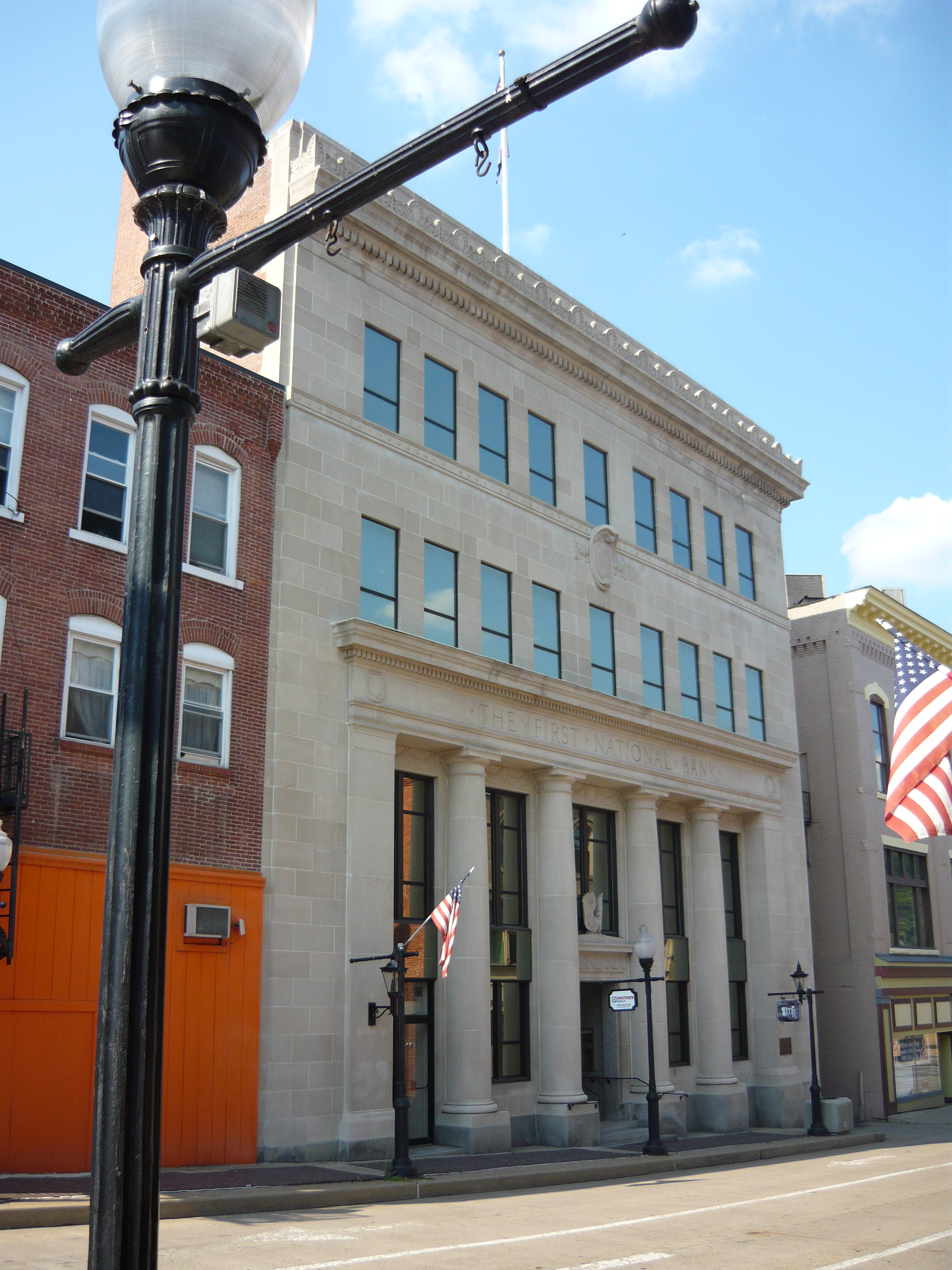
- First National Bank of Charleroi, August 2009

- Location within Pennsylvania
- Location: 210 Fifth Street, Charleroi, Pennsylvania
- Coordinates: 40°8′17.4″N 79°53′53.6″W
- Area: 0.9 acres (0.36 ha)
- Built: 1919
- Architect: William Lee Stoddart
- Architectural style: Classical Revival
- NRHP reference No.: 07000032
- Added to NRHP: February 7, 2007

First National Bank of Charleroi is a historic building in Charleroi, Pennsylvania. The building was completed in 1922, served a series of banks, and is now home to Ductmate Industries. It was listed on the National Register of Historic Places on February 7, 2007.

== History ==
The First National Bank of Charleroi was constructed out of the former Wilbur Hotel from 1919 to 1922 and was designed by William Lee Stoddart.

The First National Bank of Charleroi was acquired by the First National of Bank and Trust Company of Washington, Pennsylvania in the 1970s, which was acquired by Gallatin Bank of Fayette County in 1980. A couple years later, Gallatin was acquired by Integra Bank of Pittsburgh. The building was closed in 1997 after Integra was bought out by National City Bank in Cleveland, Ohio. In 2002, the building was bought by Ductmate Industries in 2002 and was rehabilitated to serve as their headquarters.

== See also ==
- National Register of Historic Places listings in Washington County, Pennsylvania
