= John W. Ferguson House =

Historic house in New Jersey, United States

- U.S. National Register of Historic Places
- New Jersey Register of Historic Places
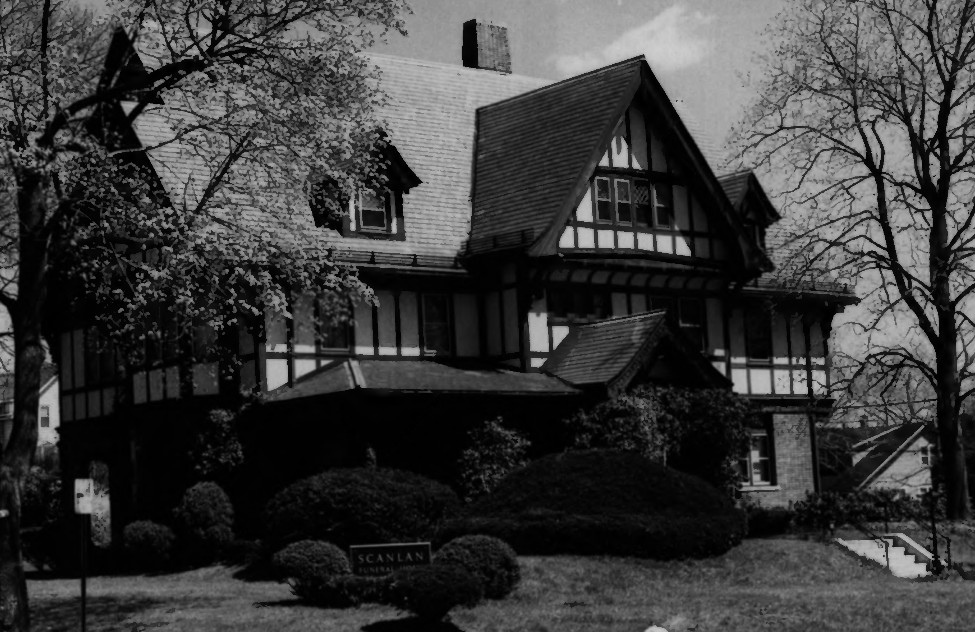
- 1979 photo

- Location within Passaic County, New Jersey Location within New Jersey Location within the United States
- Location: 421 12th Avenue, Paterson, New Jersey, U.S.
- Coordinates: 40°55′11″N 74°8′46″W
- Area: 1.1 acres (0.45 ha)
- Built: 1906
- Architect: William Lee Stoddart
- Architectural style: English
- NRHP reference No.: 80002516
- NJRHP No.: 2376

Significant dates
- Added to NRHP: May 23, 1980
- Designated NJRHP: February 1, 1980

John W. Ferguson House was located in Paterson, Passaic County, New Jersey. The house was built in 1906 and was added to the National Register of Historic Places on May 23, 1980. The house was demolished in September 1988.

== See also ==
- National Register of Historic Places listings in Passaic County, New Jersey
