= Francis Marion Hotel =

- U.S. Historic district – Contributing property
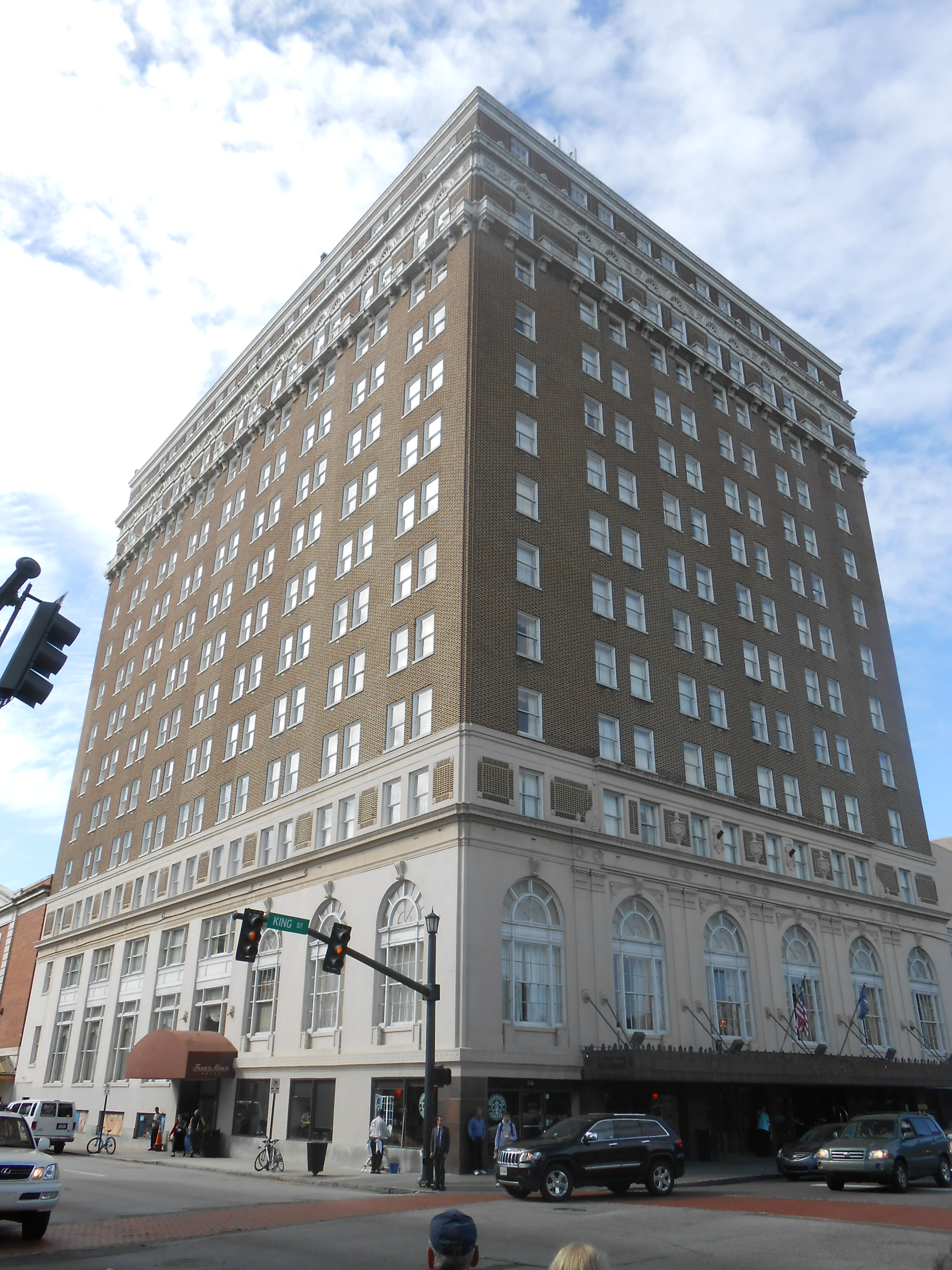

- Location within South Carolina
- Location: King and Calhoun Sts., Charleston, South Carolina
- Coordinates: 32°47′09″N 79°56′12″W
- Area: less than one acre
- Built: 1924
- Architect: W.L. Stoddart
- Architectural style: Beaux Arts
- Part of: Charleston Historic District (ID84002028)
- Added to NRHP: August 2, 1984

The Francis Marion Hotel is a historic hotel opened in 1924 and located at 387 King St., Charleston, South Carolina. It is one of the tallest buildings in Charleston. The hotel is a member of Historic Hotels of America.

== History ==
The hotel, named for the Revolutionary War hero Francis Marion, was built by local investors at a cost of $1.5 million from plans by noted New York architect William Lee Stoddart. The hotel was built in 1924 by the Marion Square Realty Co., a group headed by former mayor of Charleston T.T. Hyde. The original ownership group formed on March 13, 1920. When the hotel opened on February 7, 1924, the Francis Marion was the largest and grandest hotel in the Carolinas.

In 1952, the hotel became the first fully air-conditioned hotel in Charleston.

The Jack Tar Hotels Corp. bought the hotel in 1954. The hotel underwent a major renovation in 1955-1956 which included the creation of the Swamp Fox Room, a ground-floor restaurant named for the nickname of Francis Marion. During that work, the ground floor of the exterior was changed to red granite.

In 1961, the hotel announced plans to build a three-story parking deck to the north of the hotel on King Street according to plans drawn by Augustus Constantine. The plans were never completed.

Starting upon his retirement as the president of The Citadel in 1965 until 1975, Gen. Mark W. Clark lived with his wife in the penthouse of the hotel.

In 1976, the hotel was doing poorly, and its owners were considering whether to sell out. At the time, the hotel accounted for about 25% of all of the hotel rooms on the peninsula. In 1975, the owners had considered converting the hotel into a home for the elderly.

In 1977, a group of investors considered buying the hotel from Jack Tar Hotels, Inc. The owners at that time had considered renovating the hotel, and the City of Charleston had considered building a parking garage next to the hotel as part of a deal. However, the cost of restoring the buildings as a first-class destination, about $3 million, was too high.

The hotel was listed on the National Register of Historic Places in 1984, in a boundary increase amendment to the Charleston Historic District. Presumably this was to make it eligible for tax credit subsidy of renovations.

In December 1984, Hospitality Associates of Charleston bought the hotel for $8.5 million. The hotel operated first as the Francis Marion Ramada Hotel and then as the Radisson Francis Marion Hotel. Hospitality Associates borrowed heavily from Prudential Insurance Corp. and also from early owner Dr. Julian Youmans who had acquired the hotel in 1981. Starting in April 1986, Hospitality Associates of Charleston began falling behind in payments on its debt. In 1988, Prudential Insurance Corp. bought the hotel at a public sale for $6 million. Hospitality Associates of Charleston, the previous owner, had been unable to stay current on its payments to the successful bidder.

In 1989, shortly after Hurricane Hugo hit Charleston, a group of investors bought the hotel for $3.2 million. The new owners had a $12 million restoration plan, but a downturn in the economy prevented them from financing the plans. Mayor Joseph P. Riley intended to use the hotel as a landmark to prompt the renovation of upper King St. (the area between Calhoun St. and Cannon St.). He lobbied local banks to finance the plans, and the banks eventually contributed $5.5 million in financing; the city itself ponied up more than $4 million.

In 1991, the City of Charleston considered buying the hotel for $3,420,000 and leasing it to the College of Charleston for student housing.

The hotel was meticulously restored in 1996 with a $12 million National Trust for Historic Preservation award winning restoration. It reopened as The Francis Marion Hotel - A Clarion Hotel. The hotel went through a second round of renovations in 1997, costing $2 million, and it was renamed The Westin Francis Marion on June 18, 1998. The hotel left Westin on January 1, 2003 and has operated independently since then. The hotel currently has 235 guest rooms and suites.

== See also ==
- List of Historic Hotels of America
