= Lord Baltimore Hotel =

- U.S. National Register of Historic Places
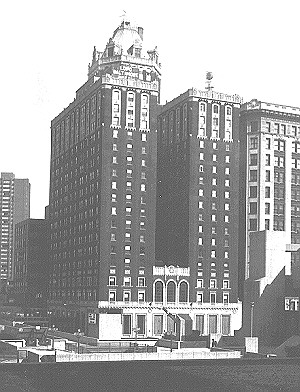

- Location within Baltimore Location within Maryland Location within the United States
- Location: 20 West Baltimore Street, Baltimore, Maryland
- Coordinates: 39°17′23″N 76°36′58″W
- Area: 0.4 acres (0.16 ha)
- Built: 1928
- Architect: William Lee Stoddart
- Architectural style: Early Commercial, French Renaissance
- NRHP reference No.: 82001587
- Added to NRHP: December 2, 1982

The Lord Baltimore Hotel is located at 20 West Baltimore Street, on the northeast corner of the intersection with North Hanover Street, and one block west of the main downtown thoroughfare of North Charles Street, in the downtown area of Baltimore, Maryland.

== Description ==
The hotel was designed by William Lee Stoddart and opened on December 30, 1928. The 22 story hotel, designed in the French Renaissance style, has a dark red brick veneer with limestone trim over a steel frame. The building, which is 289 feet tall, is topped with a tower featuring a mansard roof of copper, now aged with a green patina. It replaced the smaller but substantial Hotel Carswell, built shortly after the Great Baltimore Fire of 1904.

In 1958, after the Baltimore City Council considered but failed to pass an ordinance prohibiting racial segregation in public accommodations, the Lord Baltimore Hotel voluntarily ended its restrictive guest policies.

Following the redevelopment of the downtown area in the 1990s, the hotel is within walking distance of many Baltimore attractions such as the Inner Harbor, Camden Yards, and the National Aquarium.

The Lord Baltimore Hotel closed in 1982, needing a major renovation. It was bought by a partnership headed by local developer Saul Perlmutter in 1983 and was renovated, reopening on December 30, 1985. The partnership filed for bankruptcy in 1987, during the savings and loan crisis, and the hotel was taken over from its defunct creditor by the Federal Deposit Insurance Corporation (FDIC) in 1992.

The hotel was managed by Radisson Hotels through much of the 1990s as the Radission Plaza Lord Baltimore. The FDIC sold the hotel to Universal Equities, a Washington, D.C. group, in 1992 for $8.5 million. Universal sold the hotel for $30 million in January 1997 to Davidson Hotels, which switched the management from Radisson to Hilton and renamed the hotel the Hilton Baltimore & Towers on January 29, 1997.

The hotel was sold again in 2001 to Carlson, the owners of the Radisson Hotels franchise, regaining its previous name as the Radisson Plaza Lord Baltimore. It was sold to Rubell Hotels of Miami, Florida for $10 million (US) in August 2013. It dropped the Radisson flag and reopened in 2014 as an independent hotel, after undergoing a total remodeling of guest rooms, and restoration of the building's public spaces.

In 1982, the hotel was listed on the National Register of Historic Places. Lord Baltimore Hotel is a member of Historic Hotels of America, the official program of the National Trust for Historic Preservation.
