= Hotel Abraham Lincoln =

- U.S. National Register of Historic Places
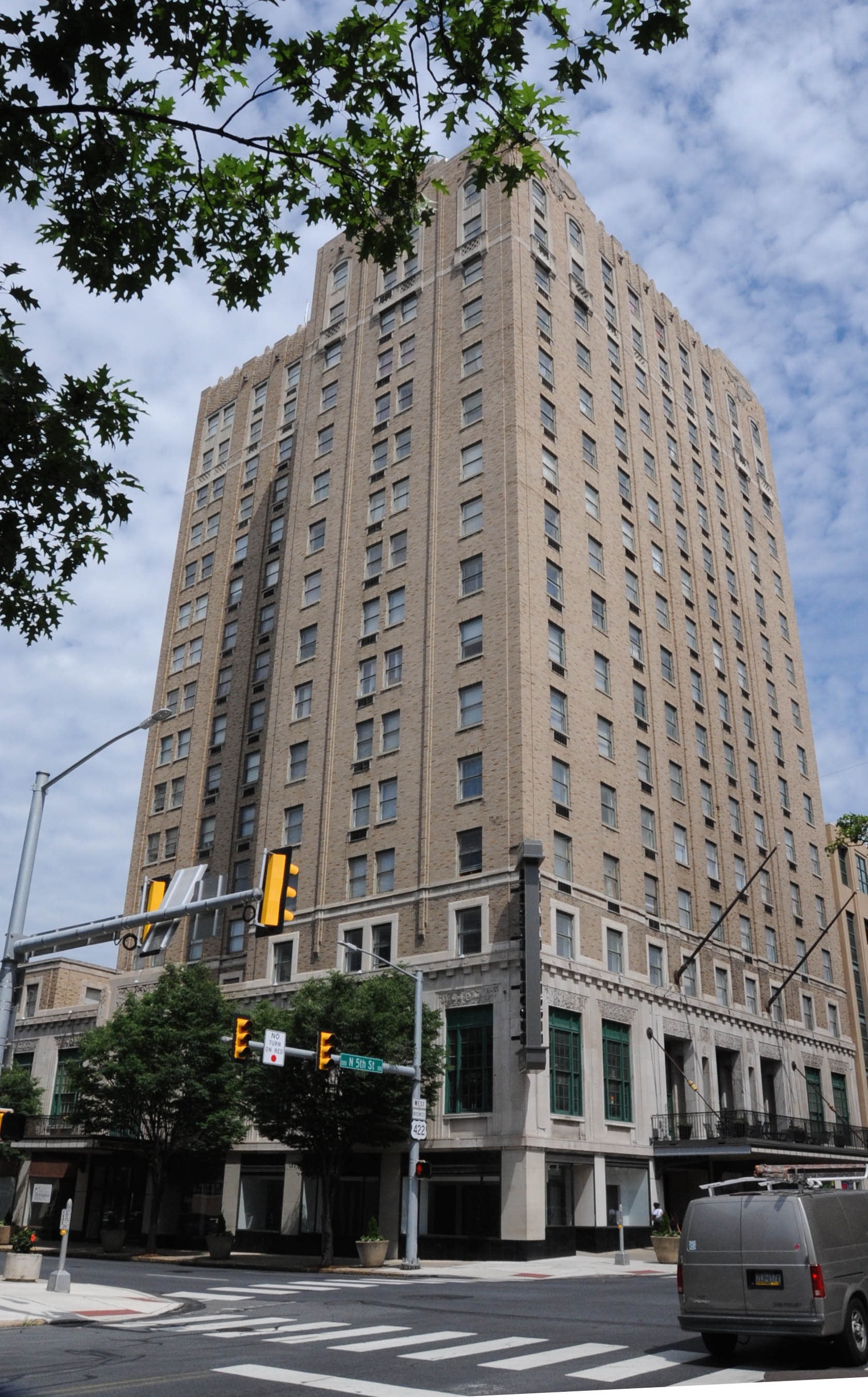
- The hotel building on June 20, 2018
- Location: 100 N 5th Street Hwy, Reading, Pennsylvania 19601
- Coordinates: 40°20′14″N 75°55′40″W
- Built: May 23, 1930
- Architect: William Lee Stoddart
- NRHP reference No.: 100001908
- Added to NRHP: December 21, 2017

The Hotel Abraham Lincoln is a historic building and former hotel in downtown Reading, Pennsylvania. Opened on May 23, 1930, the Lincoln was one of Reading's original nine grand hotels. The hotel was the last of the grand hotels to cease operations, doing so on November 1, 2016.

== History ==
The plans for the hotel were devised by the Reading Hotel Corporation in September 1928. William A. Sharp, vice president of the organization, was placed in charge of building the new hotel. New York architect William Lee Stoddart was hired to design the building, and the Honkin-Conkey Construction Company of Cleveland won the contract to build the hotel. Approximately $2 million was spent on the hotel prior to opening, with roughly half the cost going towards the construction of the building.

A public contest was held to determine the name of the building, and the name of Abraham Lincoln, the 16th U.S. president, was selected. Part of the reasoning behind naming the building after the former president was due to the Lincoln family's connections to the Reading area, with Lincoln's grandfather, Captain Abraham Lincoln, having been born in Berks County, Pennsylvania. Pennsylvania pioneer Conrad Weiser was runner-up for the hotel's name.

The Abraham Lincoln hotel was opened to the public with a weekend of activities that began on Friday, May 23, 1930. According to the Reading Times, the opening events were notably devoid of speeches, instead being opened "with fox trots and clapping of hands and murmurs of delight" that were characteristic of ceremonies from the Roaring Twenties, despite the hotel opening seven months after the Wall Street crash of 1929 that signaled the beginning of the Great Depression. Upon opening, the hotel contained 300 rooms across 16 stories, making it one of the tallest buildings in the city. Guests could stay at the hotel for as low as $2.50 a night.

The hotel is known for being the place where famous American composer and conductor John Philip Sousa died after suffering from heart failure in his hotel room on March 6, 1932. He had conducted a rehearsal of "The Stars and Stripes Forever" the previous day with the Reading's Ringgold Band as its guest conductor. The hotel was also the site of a visit from First Lady Eleanor Roosevelt, who spoke from a balcony in the Lincoln's lobby. The Lincoln hotel is also the site that The Fabulous Moolah wrote in her autobiography that Andre the Giant drank 127 beers in a Reading, Pennsylvania, hotel bar and later passed out in the lobby. The staff could not move him and had to leave him there until he awoke.

After facing financial difficulties in the 1980s, the hotel was closed for nearly a decade. When the building went under new ownership, it was renovated to "recapture the look the Lincoln had when it first opened" and was reopened in 1997. Around this time, several floors of the building were converted into apartments, with only 104 hotel rooms remaining. The hotel operated under the Wyndham Hotel Group until 2013.

The Hotel Abraham Lincoln was briefly the city of Reading's only major hotel until the opening of the DoubleTree by Hilton Hotel Reading nearby. Within a year of the new DoubleTree opening, the Hotel Abraham Lincoln ceased operations on November 1, 2016, citing competition from the DoubleTree. The remaining 104 rooms were converted into around 50 apartments.

The building was renovated in 2018 and is now used to house the Lincoln Tower Apartments, containing 97 luxury one and two bedroom apartments. Abe's Restaurant, along with a catering and wedding venue, remained on the lower levels.

The building was listed on the National Register of Historic Places on December 21, 2017.
