= Thomas M. Price =

American architect

- Born: March 17, 1916; Blacksburg, Virginia, U.S.
- Died: November 6, 1998 (aged 82); Fredericksburg, Texas, U.S.
- Education: Virginia Polytechnic Institute; Harvard Graduate School of Design
- Occupation: Architect
- Practice: Modern architecture
- Buildings: Sealy & Smith Professional Building; Galveston Artillery Club; Caravageli House; Beachcomber Motel
- Projects: Galveston Historic District studies (1970, 1973)

Thomas M. Price (March 17, 1916 – November 6, 1998) is an American architect who has been called "Galveston's foremost modern architect" by historian and Rice University faculty member Stephen Fox, an Adjunct Lecturer of the School of Architecture. Price's portfolio of designs encompass a diverse variety of building types. Almost all of the buildings that were built from his designs are located in southeastern United States.

== Early life and education ==
Price was born in Blacksburg, Virginia, on March 17, 1916. Price attended the Virginia Polytechnic Institute, from which he received his bachelor's degree in 1938. He received his master's degree from the Harvard Graduate School of Design in 1941. While at Harvard he studied under modern masters like Marcel Breuer and Walter Gropius.

== Career ==
=== Galveston ===
Price was primarily active from the 1950s to the late 1970s, designing private residences, hotels, motels, schools, a social club, a beach house and commercial buildings. His preference for trimly detailed buildings with walls treated as planes of glass or solidly paneled surfaces is evident in many of the buildings he designed in Galveston. These include the Seahorse Motel (1956, now demolished) and the Beachcomber Motel (1963) on Seawall Boulevard, the Galveston Artillery Club (1959) on Avenue O, the gymnasium of Gladneo Parker Elementary School (1960) on 69th Street, and his largest project that he worked on in the city, the 10-story Sealy & Smith Professional Building (1964, demolished 2001) on University Boulevard. Price designed several of the most distinctive modern houses built in Galveston, among them the Caravageli House (1954) on Caduceus Place, the Stirling House on South Shore Drive (1956), the Mehos House on Harbor View Drive (1958), the Yen House on Marine Drive (1959), and the Kelso Camp on Offatts Bayou (1963). Price was involved in early efforts to preserve Galveston's 19th-century architectural heritage. He was responsible for two pioneer preservation planning studies prepared for the city: Galveston, Texas: Historical District Guide (1970) and Historical Development Plan for Galveston, Texas (1973).

=== Other cities ===
Outside Galveston, Price designed the Lasher House (1956) in the Memorial section of Houston, Texas, which has been renovated and restored by Ray Bailey architects and the Bauer House outside Port Lavaca, Texas (1958). Including Houston, he designed banks in Alvin, Bay City, Freeport, Hitchcock, and Webster, Texas, in the 1960s. He also designed hotels in Asheville, North Carolina, Biloxi, Mississippi, Marathon, Florida, and San Francisco, California (most affiliated with the Jack Tar chain) around the same time.

== Retirement and death ==
Thomas M. Price retired to 320 W. Burbank St. in Fredericksburg, Texas, where he designed the Nimitz Museum. He died on November 6, 1998, at the age of 82. Price's house designs are among the most distinctive in Galveston, and are listed in the Galveston Architectural Guide.
