= Johnston Building (Charlotte, North Carolina) =

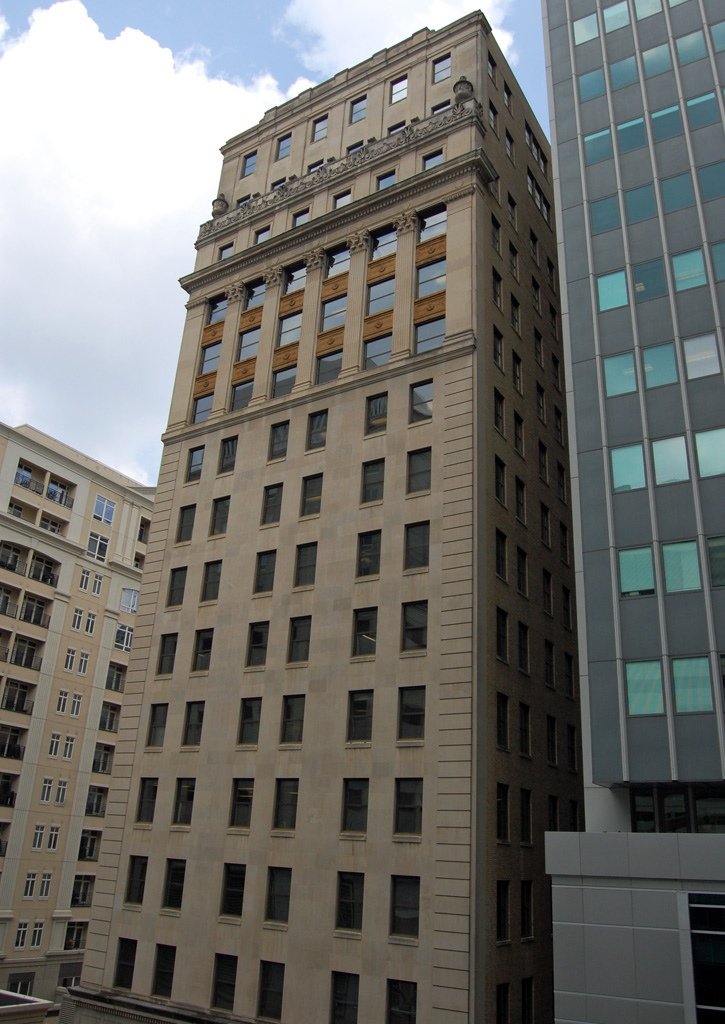
- Johnston Building in Charlotte, North Carolina, 2007

General information
- Type: Office
- Architectural style: Neoclassical
- Location: 212 South Tryon Street; Charlotte, North Carolina, U.S.
- Coordinates: 35.2262°N 80.8448°W
- Opening: 1924
- Owner: KHP Capital Partners

Height
- Roof: 225.65 feet (69 m)

Technical details
- Floor count: 17
- Lifts/elevators: 4

Design and construction
- Architect: William Lee Stoddart
- Main contractor: Hunkin-Conkey Construction

Other information
- Public transit: Tryon Street

Website
- www.johnstonbuildingcharlotte.com

The Johnston Building, also known as the Midtown Plaza, is a 17-story office high-rise in Charlotte, North Carolina with an approximate height of 225.65 feet (69 m). Originally 15 stories when completed in 1924, it was the tallest building in Charlotte until 1926. The building was listed on the National Register of Historic Places in 2025.

== History ==
Located at 212 South Tryon Street, the lot was home to the Trust Building, which burned in 1922. Anchor Mills Company bought the site for $100 in 1923 from the Textile Office Building Company. William Lee Stoddart, a New York City architect known for large hotels, had designed the Hotel Charlotte, which was under construction and had Charles Worth Johnston as an investor. The builder was Hunkin-Conkey Construction, and the cost was reported to be $600,000.

The Neo-classical steel frame building had limestone blocks for the facade, and buff-colored brick, but these were only for appearance and did not support the building.

Rental agent Thomas Griffith said the Johnston Building had tenants booked even before completion. Offices housed cotton brokers, insurance agents, attorneys, and realty companies. Among those located in the building when it opened: the E.C. Griffith Company, architect C.C. Hook, and Cameron Morrison. Southern Bell took over the entire fifteenth floor by 1926 and had all of three floors and parts of others by 1947.

A 1927 Chamber of Commerce report said the Johnston Building had 125,000 square feet (11,600 m^{2}) of "first class" office space. Only the First National Bank Building, which superseded the Johnston Building as Charlotte's tallest in 1926, had more space with 160,000 square feet (15,000 m^{2}).

In 1929 two more floors were added. The current building has a total of 172,382 square feet.

David R. Johnston, son of Charles Worth Johnston, took over the family business interests. Anchor Mills decided to sell the property in 1975 due to the younger Johnston's health problems. Johnston Building Inc. assumed a $2.1 million mortgage with New York Life Insurance Company, which took over the building in 1981 when payments could not be made. That same year, New York Life sold the Johnston Building to Howard, Howard and Barnard of California, after which renovations began. The appraised value of the building and lot in 1991 was nearly $17.2 million, $2 million of that for the lot.

The Dilweg Companies of Durham, North Carolina announced February 2, 2015 that the company bought the Johnston Building. County records showed the purchase price was $25.3 million.

The building was purchased by KHP Capital Partners in May 2025 for $19.3 million. KHP has invested $1.25 billion in renovating existing hotels and rehabilitating obsolete real estate into boutique hotels. The plan for the building is for it the entirety of it to be converted in a 245-room hotel, called The Beckworth Hotel. The hotel will have a first floor coffee shop, second floor ballroom, third floor conference center, and 17th floor penthouse bar. Interior demolition has begun, and the renovation will be completed in the summer of 2026. Part of the project is leveraging the building's age and historic significance to get tax credits from the National Park Service. The tax credits will cover 20% of rehabilitation expenses. However, most of the money must be used for rehabilitating the building and the work must meet specific standards.

== See also ==
- List of tallest buildings in Charlotte
- List of tallest buildings in North Carolina
- List of tallest buildings in the United States

| Preceded by Independence Building | Tallest Building in Charlotte; 1924—1926; 81 m | Succeeded by 112 Tryon Plaza |
