= William Lee Stoddart =

American architect

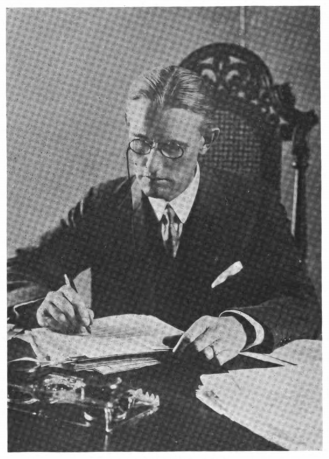
- Stoddart, circa 1924
- Born: November 3, 1868; Tenafly, New Jersey, U.S.
- Died: October 2, 1940 (aged 71); New Rochelle, New York, U.S.
- Occupation: Architect
- Buildings: Georgian Terrace Hotel, Winecoff Hotel (both in Atlanta); Lord Baltimore Hotel (Baltimore)

William Lee Stoddart (1868–1940) was an architect who designed urban hotels in the Eastern United States. Although he was born in Tenafly, New Jersey, most of his commissions were in the South. He maintained offices in Atlanta and New York City.

== Early life and education ==
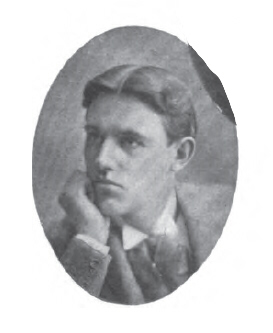
Stoddart as a student at Columbia University

Stoddart was born in Tenafly, New Jersey. He attended Columbia University in New York City, although it is uncertain if he graduated.

== Career ==
After departing Columbia University, Stoddart worked in the office of George B. Post for ten years before opening his own office.

=== Approach to design ===
Stoddart took pride in the efficient, rational design of his hotels, which reflected the enthusiasm for scientific management of his era. He expressed his approach to hotel design as a series of rules or formulas that would lead to maximum profitability. His design philosophy was similar to that of E.M. Statler's emphasis on efficiency in hotel architecture, except that Stoddart's hotels were smaller, less luxurious (e.g., not all guestrooms had ensuite bathrooms), and were in smaller cities. Both Stoddart and Statler aimed their hotels at serving the market niche of traveling sales representatives.

=== Commissions ===
==== 1906 to 1920 ====
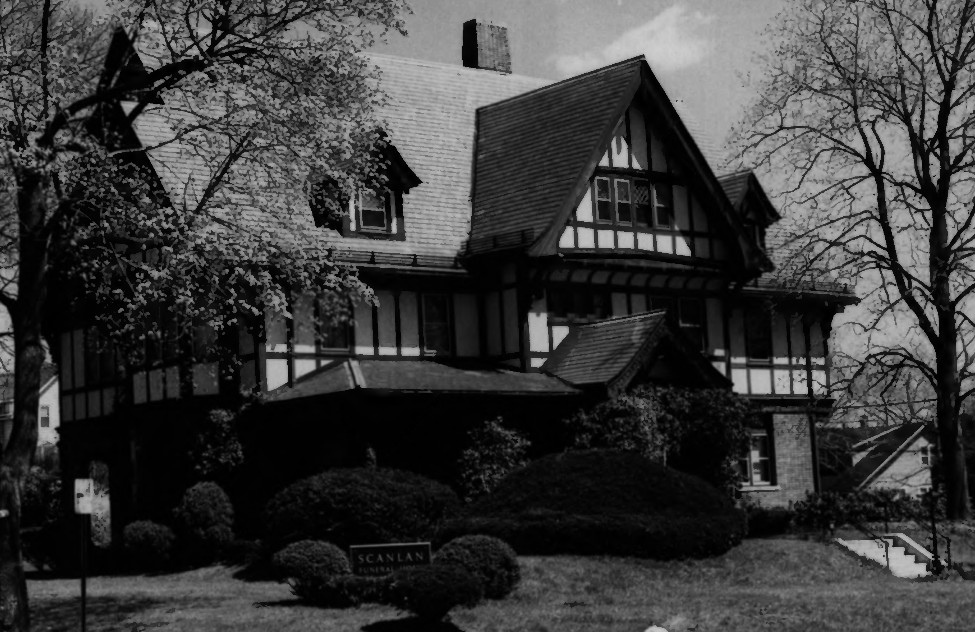
John W. Ferguson House in Paterson, New Jersey (1906-07)

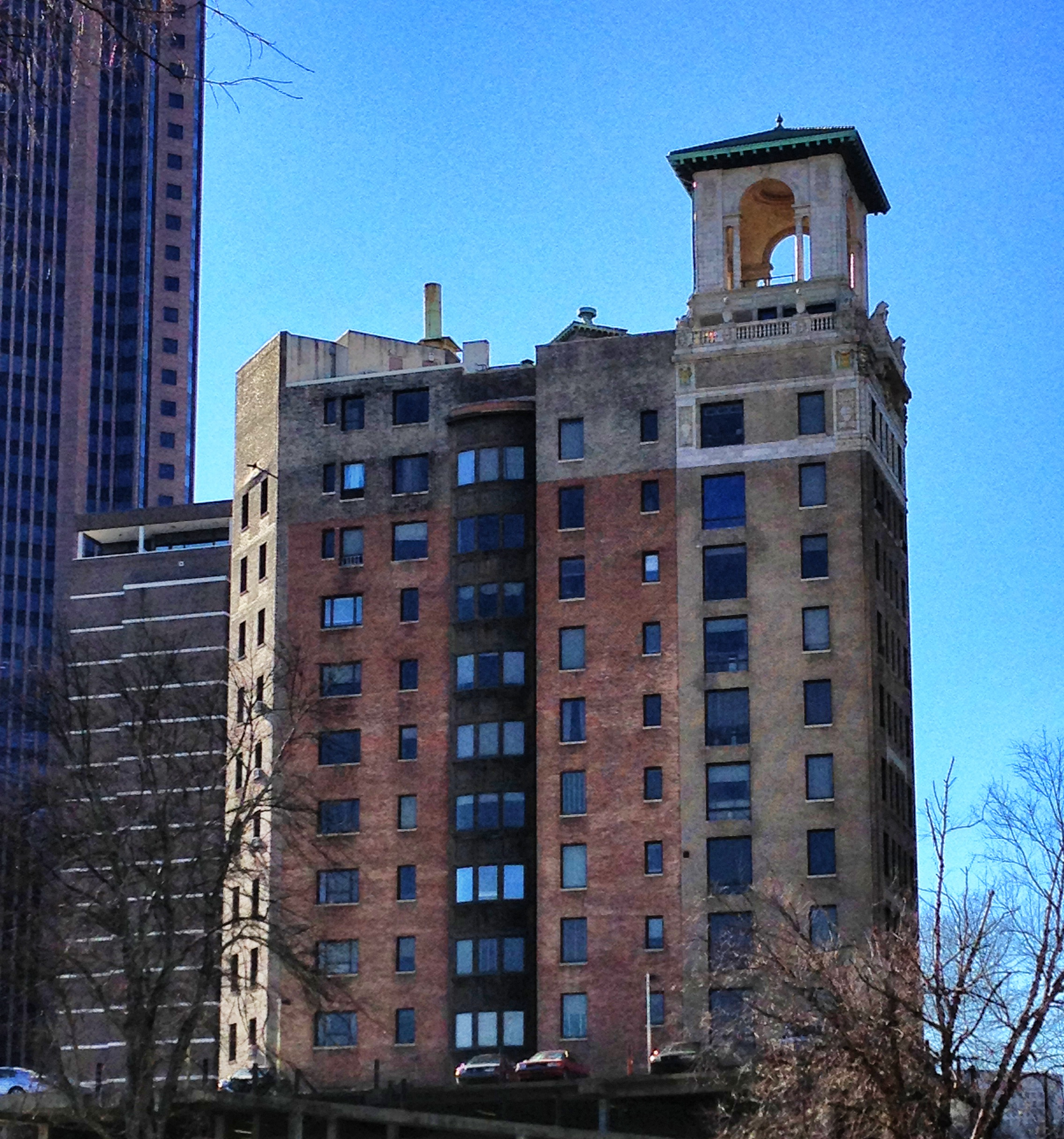
Ponce de Leon Apartments in Atlanta (1912-13)

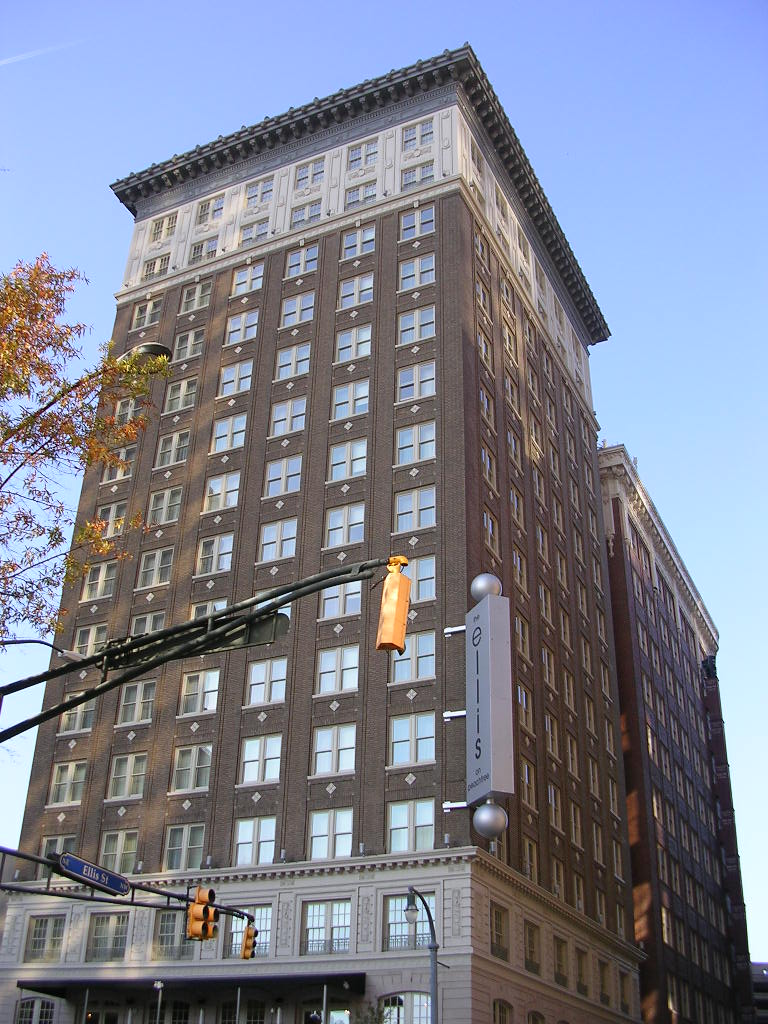
Winecoff Hotel, now the Ellis Hotel, in Atlanta (1913)

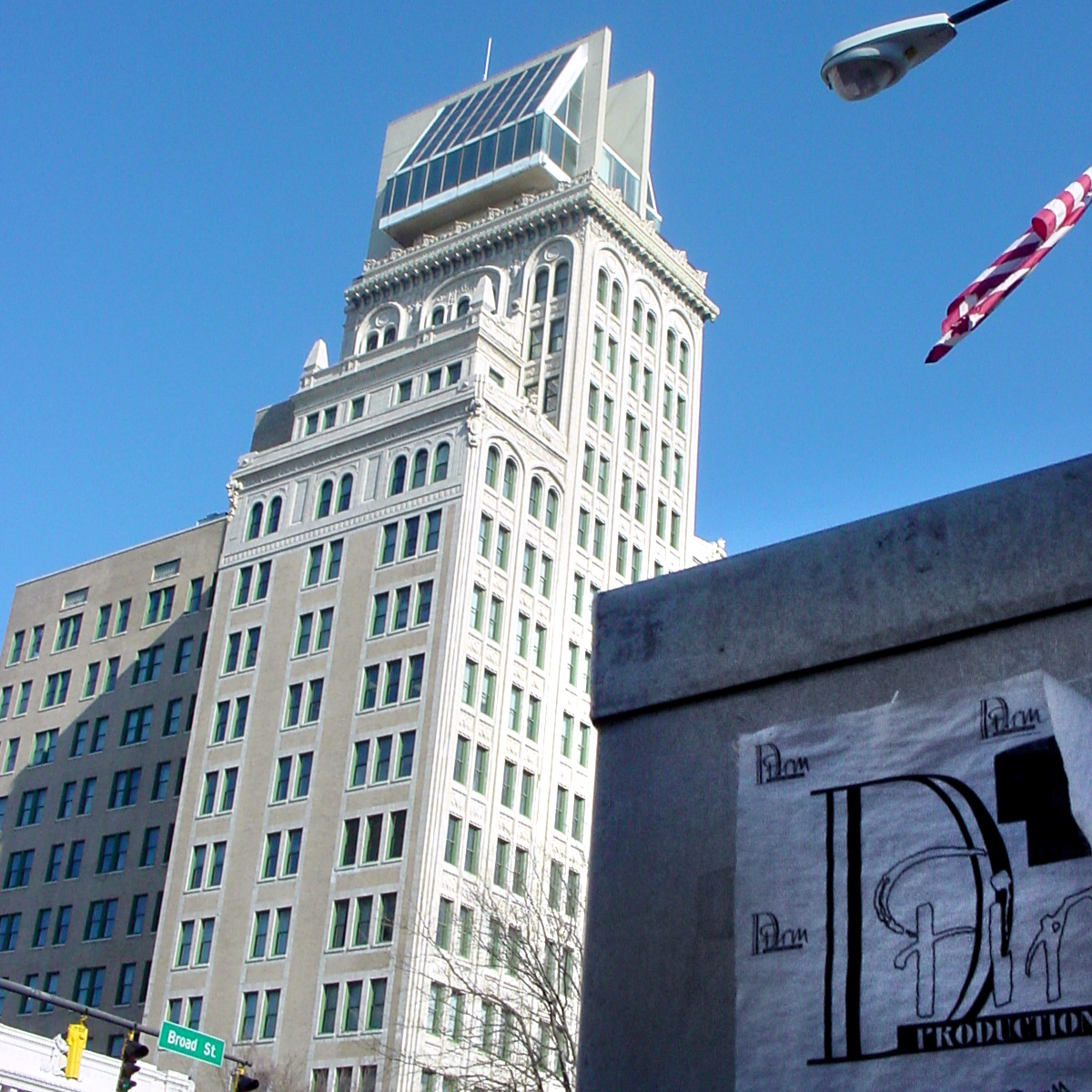
Lamar Building in Augusta, Georgia (1913-18)

- John W. Ferguson House, Paterson, New Jersey (1906–1907): This early commission by Stoddart was located at 421 12th Avenue. Despite being on the National Register of Historic Places, the house was demolished in 1988.
- Browning School, Tenafly, New Jersey (1907): This 2½-story brick school was built at 27 West Chester Avenue (corner of Tenafly Road) in a style described as Second Renaissance Revival. It has since been converted to residential condos, known as Browning House.
- San Carlos Hotel, Pensacola, Florida (1909–1910): This seven-story hotel was at 1 North Palafox Street and had 175 rooms when opened, later enlarged to 403 rooms during the 1920s. The hotel closed in 1982, and after a period of vacancy, was torn down in 1993.
- Georgian Terrace Hotel, Atlanta (1910–1911): In the Beaux Arts style, this 10-story hotel is located at 659 Peachtree Street NE, and has recently been renovated.
- Hotel Tybee, Tybee Island, Georgia (1911): This beach resort was the second hotel of this name on this site. It had 100 or 150 rooms (sources differ). It was razed in 1958.
- Dempsey Apartments, Macon, Georgia (1912): This nine-story apartment building was initially a 230-room hotel, and is now used for seniors' apartments. The building has been known as Hotel Dempsey, The Dempsey and as the Dempsey Motor Hotel, and its address has variously been given as 515 Cherry Street and 523 Cherry Street. Some sources give its height as 11 stories, because a 1970s addition has more floors than the original structure.
- Ponce de Leon Apartments, Atlanta (1912–1913): This 11-story structure, still in use at 75 Ponce de Leon Avenue, is across Ponce De Leon Avenue from the Georgian Terrace Hotel (above), and was designed in a Beaux Arts and Renaissance Revival style. The second through ninth floors had two large apartments per floor, and the top two floors consisted of small "bachelor suites."
- Hotel Savannah, Savannah, Georgia (1913): This ten-story building is located at 7 East Congress Street (address sometimes given as 36 Bull Street).
- Winecoff Hotel, Atlanta (1913): This 15-story building at 176 Peachtree Street NW was renamed the Peachtree on Peachtree Hotel in 1951, and after being empty for many years, it re-opened as the Ellis Hotel in 2007. In 1946, the hotel had suffered a disastrous fire, killing 119 people. Of the 119 deaths, 36 died from falling or jumping. The hotel lacked fire escapes, and the sole staircase had no fire doors, which allowed the fire to spread rapidly from floor to floor.
- Schenectady County Courthouse, Schenectady, New York (1913): This is a 4-story classical structure, and the architect is listed as Stoddart and Weathers.
- Marion Building, Augusta, Georgia (1914): This 10-story structure, located at 739 Broad Street, was originally known as the Chronicle Building. After the city's 1916 fire, The Augusta Chronicle moved to 725 Broad Street, and the 1914 building was repaired and rechristened as the Marion Building. The architects were William Lee Stoddart and Augusta architect G. Lloyd Preacher.
- Lamar Building, Augusta, Georgia (1913–1918): This 16-story office building at 753 Broad Street was named for Joseph Rucker Lamar, and was designed jointly by Stoddart with G. Lloyd Preacher, an Augusta-based architect. The building took so long to build because its construction was interrupted by a major fire in 1916 that destroyed much of downtown Augusta. In 1974-1975, a penthouse was added, designed by I. M. Pei. The building is listed in the National Register of Historic Places.
- Tutwiler Hotel, Birmingham, Alabama (1914): This structure, which stood at the corner of 20th Street North and Fifth Avenue North, was demolished in 1974. The current Tutwiler Hotel is not the same structure even though it is in a historic building from the same era.
- Connally Building, Atlanta (1915): At 54 Peachtree Street (corner of Alabama Street), adjacent to the Underground Atlanta retail center, this building has been so extensively renovated that it bears little resemblance to the original design, other than the terra cotta facade on the lower stories. This was originally a six-story office building with a terracotta facade, which replaced an earlier Connally Building on the site. In the 1980s, eleven stories were added and it was converted into a hotel. It has operated under the names Howard Johnson Plaza Suites, University Place at Underground, The Suite Hotel at the Underground, and most recently it became a Fairfield Inn & Suites.
- Citizens National Bank Building (now Hilliard-Lyons Building), Evansville, Indiana (1916): This 12-story office building, with a stone and terracotta façade, stands at 329 Main Street (corner of Southeast 4th Street) in Evansville. It is listed in the National Register of Historic Places.
- Penn-Harris Hotel, Harrisburg, Pennsylvania (1918): This 12-story building was located at Third and Walnut Streets in Harrisburg. At its opening in 1918, it had 250 rooms, later expanded to 400 rooms after an addition was built in 1925. The hotel was operated by Niagara Falls businessman Frank A. Dudley and the United Hotels Company in 1933. The hotel closed in December 1972 and was demolished in 1973.
- O. Henry Hotel, Greensboro, North Carolina (1917–1919): This eight-story hotel had 170 rooms, each with bath or shower. It was on the southwest corner of North Elm and Bellemeade Streets. Following a fire in 1976, the hotel stood empty and was demolished in 1979. This hotel should not be confused with a 1998 hotel of the same name, on a different site in Greensboro.
- Hotel Farragut, Knoxville, Tennessee (1917–1919): This 9-story hotel is at West Clinch Avenue and South Gay Street. After extensive renovations, it now operates as the Hyatt Place Knoxville
- Montefiore Medical Center North Division Annex, Bronx, New York (1919): This three-story concrete building is at 4401 Bronx Boulevard, corner of Nereid Avenue (formerly 238th Street). It was originally built as a factory.

==== 1920 to 1930 ====
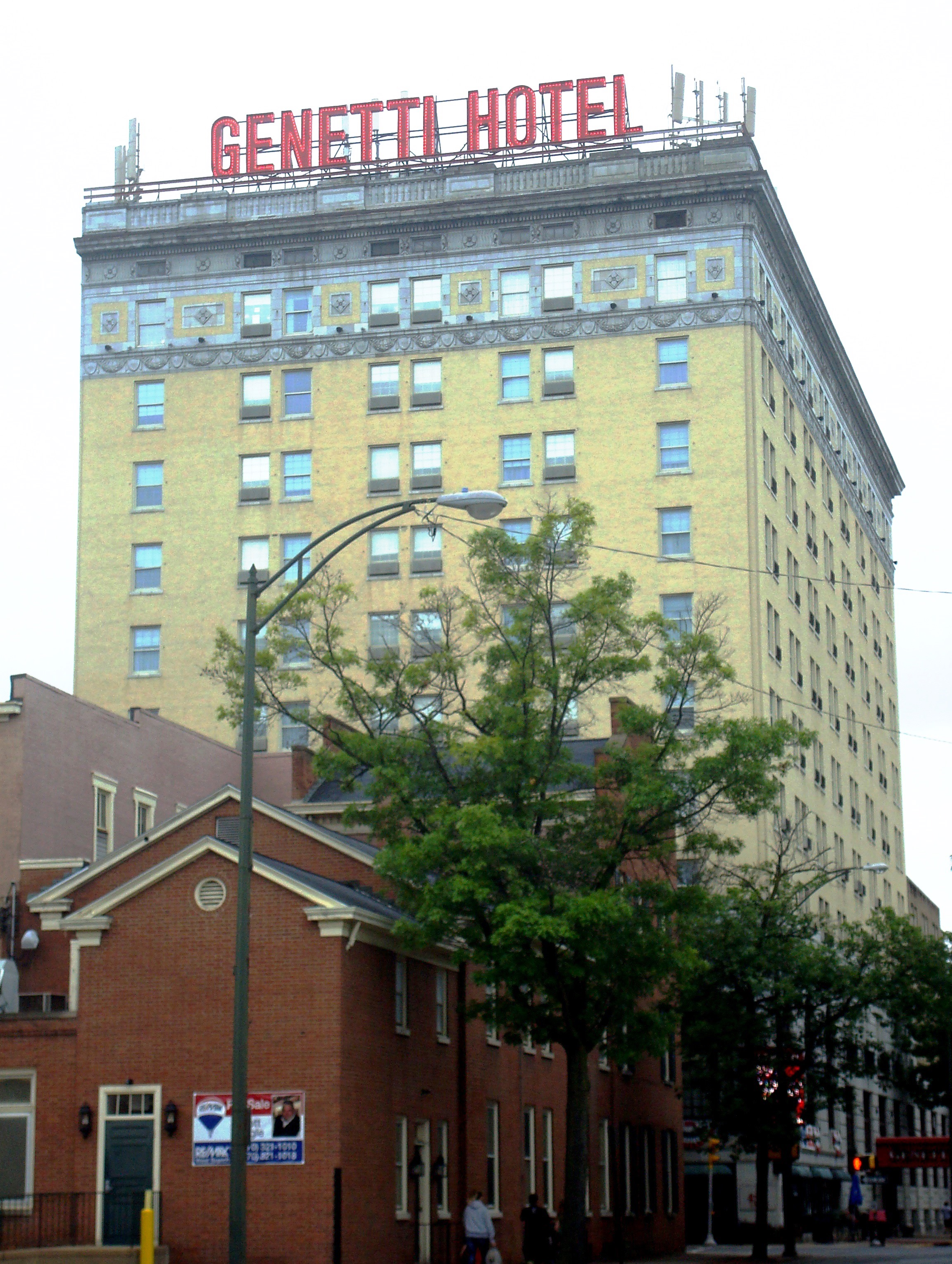
Genetti Hotel in Williamsport, Pennsylvania (1921)

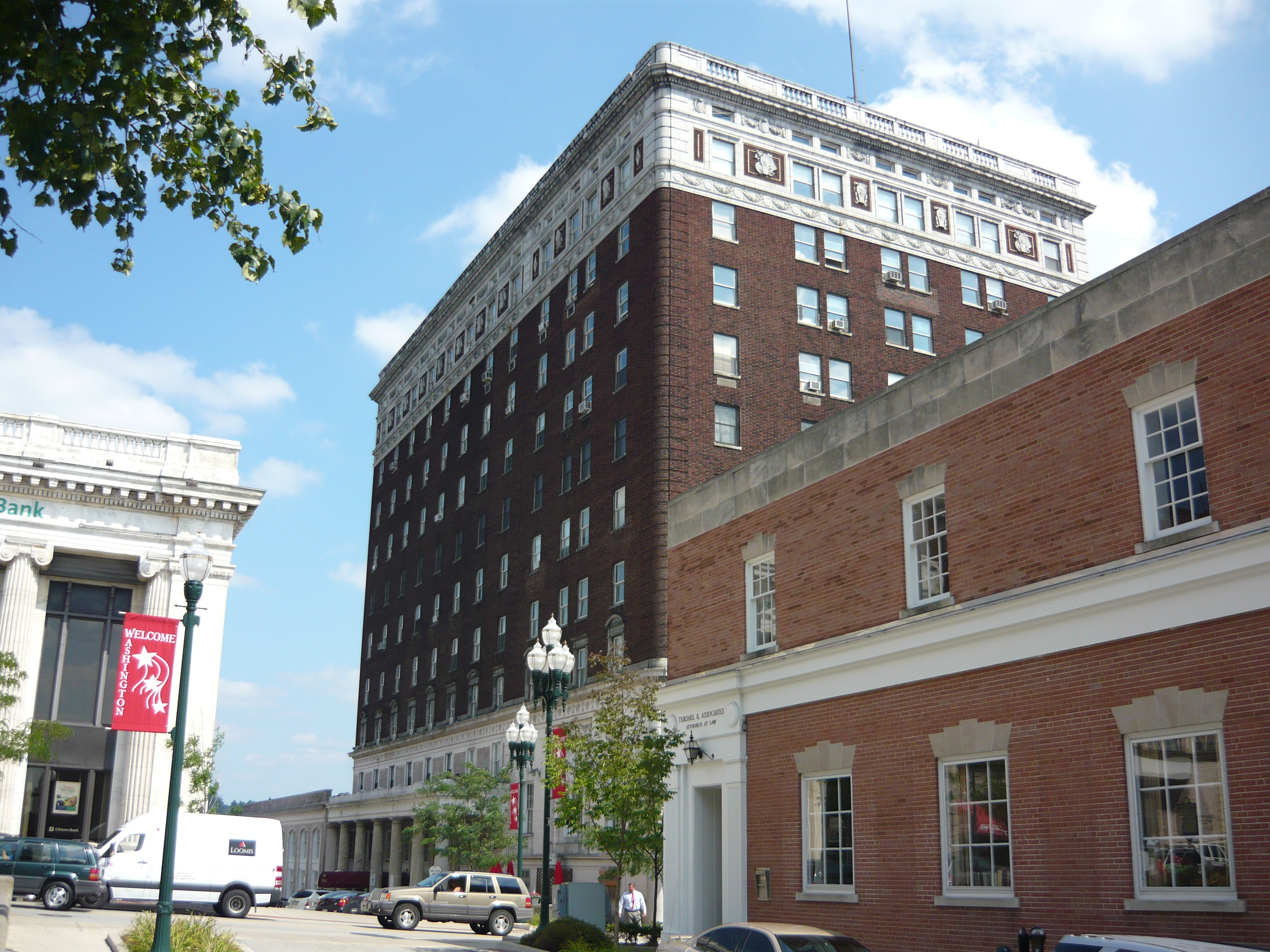
The George Washington Hotel in Washington, Pennsylvania (1923)

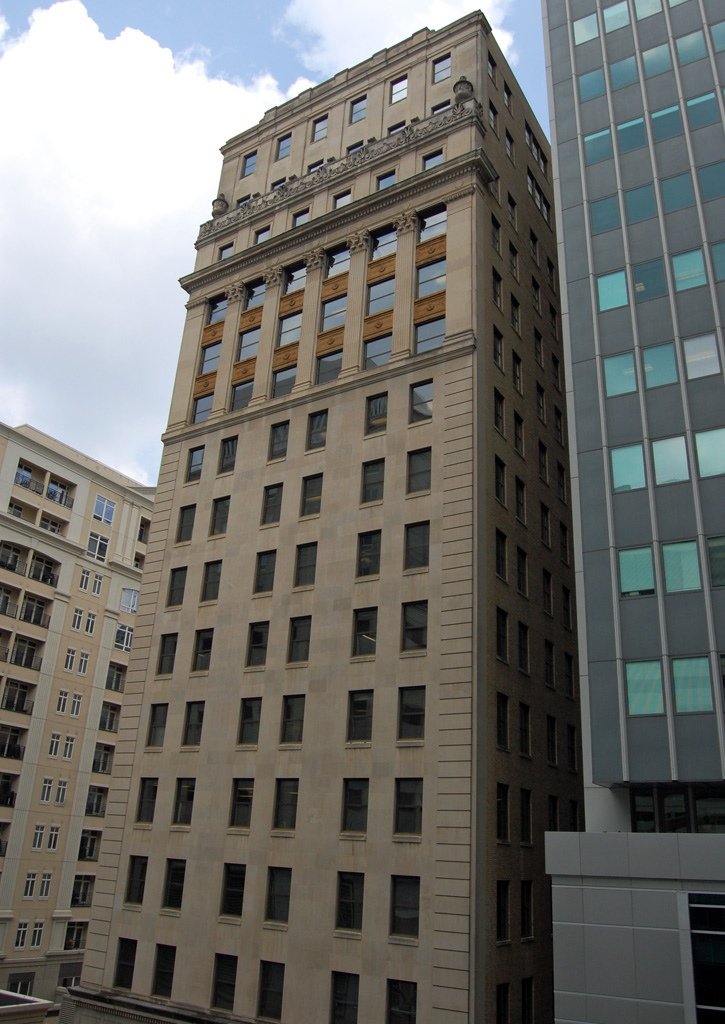
Johnston Building in Charlotte, North Carolina (1924)

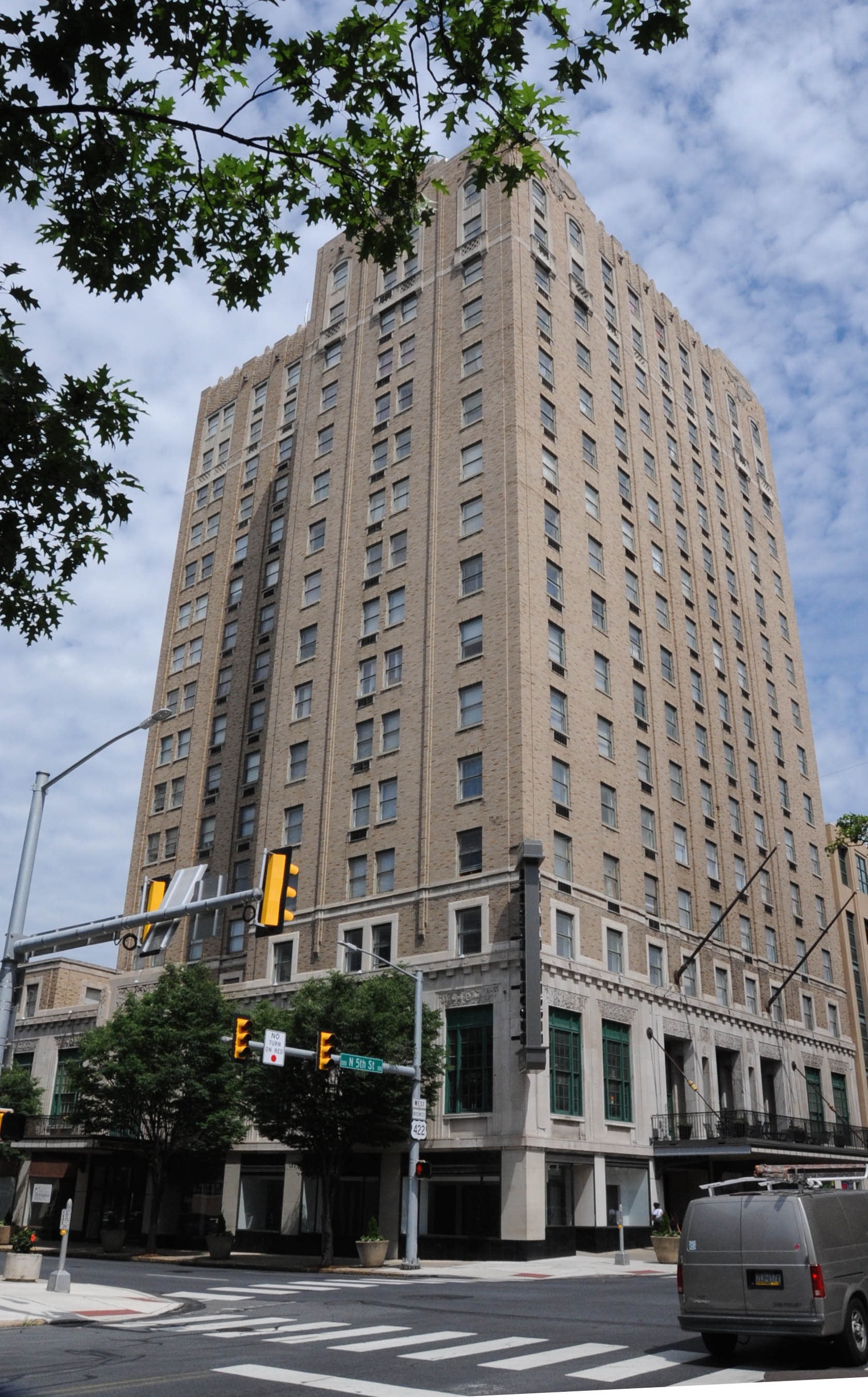
Hotel Abraham Lincoln in Reading, Pennsylvania (1930)

- High Point Hotel, High Point, North Carolina (1920): This 9-story hotel at 400 North Main Street was later known as Sheraton Hotel High Point. It is now the Sheraton Towers, and serves as apartments for seniors.
- Genetti Hotel, Williamsport, Pennsylvania (1921): Originally the Lycoming Hotel, this 10-story hotel at 200 West Fourth Street currently operates as the Genetti Hotel & Suites.
- Hotel Pennsylvania, Bedford, Pennsylvania (1922): This 5-story hotel, later known as the Penn Bedford Hotel, still stands at 116 East Pitt Street and is now known as the Hotel Pennsylvania Apartments. T.W. Biddle, Jr., was listed as the architect and Stoddart as "consulting architect and engineer" As built, it had 75 rooms with 45 baths, and a glass-covered roof garden.
- First National Bank of Charleroi, Charleroi, Pennsylvania (1919–1922): Located at 210 Fifth Street, this was originally the Wilbur Hotel, built in 1889 by an unknown architect. Stoddart was the architect for its remodeling as a bank. Among other changes, Stoddart added a Greek Revival facade. The building is listed on the National Register of Historic Places.
- Second National Bank, Erie, Pennsylvania (1922): This one story (with mezzanine) classical structure was at the southeast corner of Peach Street and 9th Street, since demolished.
- San Juan Hotel, Orlando, Florida (1922–1923): Also known as San Juan de Ulloa Hotel, this eight-story structure was an addition to the existing 1885 hotel of the same name at the intersection of Orange and Central Avenues. The entire hotel was demolished in 1980.
- Bon Marché Building, Asheville, North Carolina (1923): Later known as Ivey's Department Store, and currently the Haywood Park Hotel. This four-story structure was Stoddart's only department store, and it was only in 1985 that it was converted into a hotel. As the building is located on a corner, its address is variously given as 26-32 Haywood Street and as One Battery Park Avenue.
- George Washington Hotel, Washington, Pennsylvania (1923): Located at 60 South Main Street, this complex included a movie theater which has been demolished, but the hotel itself continues to operate and has been renovated in 2007. The hotel's Oval Room, now a banquet room, had originally functioned as the theater foyer.
- Battery Park Hotel, Asheville, North Carolina (1923): This 14-story hotel at 1 Battle Square is now a seniors' residence known as the Battery Park Apartments. It is listed in the National Register of Historic Places.
- Hotel Charlotte, Charlotte, North Carolina (1922–1924): This 12-story, 250 room hotel opened in 1924 at 237 West Trade Street. The name Citizens Hotel was used in an early advertisement prior to opening, then the Hotel Charlotte. In 1961, it was renamed the Queen Charlotte Hotel, and later became the White House Inn. It closed in 1973 and was demolished in 1988, despite being listed in the National Register of Historic Places.
- State Bank of Orlando & Trust Company, Orlando, Florida (1923–1924): At 1 North Orange Avenue in Orlando, this 10-story building now houses the Florida A&M University College of Law.
- John Sevier Hotel, Johnson City, Tennessee (1924): This 225-room hotel is located at 141 East Market Street (corner of North Roan Street). In 1979, it was converted into seniors' housing and renamed the John Sevier Center. On Christmas Eve 1989, there was a major fire in which 16 people died. The building continues to function as housing for senior citizens.
- Francis Marion Hotel, Charleston, South Carolina (1924): This 12-story, 234-room hotel is at 387 King Street. When Francis Marion Hotel opened in 1924, it was the largest hotel in the Carolinas. In 1996, the hotel was meticulously restored with a $12 million National Trust for Historic Preservation award winning restoration. Today, this full-service hotel is the only high-rise building located in the historic district of Charleston, SC.
- Johnston Building, Charlotte, North Carolina (1924): It is located at 212 South Tryon Street. At 15 stories, this was Charlotte's tallest building when it opened; two more floors were added in the late 1920s. The lobby is particularly noteworthy because it runs the length of the building with marble columns, a marble staircase, and an arched, coffered ceiling. The building had been commissioned by Charles Worth Johnston (1861–1941), president of Johnston Mills Company in addition to other textile and banking interests.
- George Vanderbilt Hotel, Asheville, North Carolina (1924): This nine-story structure at 75 Haywood Street is now used as a seniors' residence known as Vanderbilt Apartments.
- Poinsett Hotel, Greenville, South Carolina (1924–1925): This 12-story hotel at 120 South Main Street now operates as the Westin Poinsett. It is listed on the National Register of Historic Places.
- Concord National Bank and Hotel, Concord, North Carolina (1925): This building at 2-14 Union Street North has a typical Stoddart facade of red brick with Georgian detailing. One source lists Christopher Gadsden Sayre as "possible architect".
- McAllister Hotel, Hanover, Pennsylvania (1925–1926): This 5-story hotel, still standing at 11 York Street, has at various times been known as the McAllister Inn, Abbot House, and Homewood Retirement Center. As initially built, it had 75 rooms, of which 21 had baths or showers. It is now used for seniors' housing.
- George Mason Hotel, Alexandria, Virginia (1925–1926): This 6-story hotel at the corner of Washington and Prince Streets now serves as an office building. At the hotel's opening, it had 106 rooms, and publicity material emphasized that every room had a toilet (although not necessarily a tub and/or shower). It closed in 1971 and was converted to offices. It was restored as the Hotel Heron in 2024.
- Goldsboro Hotel, Goldsboro, North Carolina (1924–1926): This was a 200-room eight-story hotel, and for a period it operated as Goldsboro Motor Hotel. It was renovated for use as seniors’ housing in 1977, now known as Waynesboro House. The structure is located at the intersection of Carter and Walnut Streets.
- Patrick Henry Hotel, Roanoke, Virginia (1925): When it opened in 1925, this 11-story hotel had 300 rooms, all with bath or shower. A renovation in the late 1960s led to the rooms being joined together to form 121 one-bedroom apartments. The hotel, located at 617 South Jefferson Street, is on the National Register of Historic Places. In October 2009, plans were announced to convert the building into apartments.
- Yorktowne Hotel, York, Pennsylvania (1925): This 11-story Renaissance revival hotel at 48 East Market Street closed in November 2016. The York County Industrial Development Authority led a $54–65 million rehabilitation from 2017 to 2022, transforming the property into a vibrant Hilton Tapestry Collection boutique hotel. The grand reopening took place on January 31, 2023, marking it as the 100th hotel in Hilton’s Tapestry Collection.
- Winthrop Hotel, Tacoma, Washington (1925): Currently known as the Winthrop Apartments, this 12-story structure is at 776 Commerce Street (also bounded by South 9th Street and South Broadway) in Tacoma. It is remarkable for being so distant from the east coast where Stoddart's commissions were concentrated.
- Virginia Dare Hotel, Elizabeth City, North Carolina (1927): Now known as the Virginia Dare (Elderly) Apartments, the nine-story building was billed as the Albemarle's first "skyscraper" when it opened in 1927. It remains the tallest building in the region. The hotel contained 100 rooms, and a heated garage (now the rear parking lot) with an interior filling station and lubricating stand. It remained the premier hotel and center of Elizabeth City's social activities for over 40 years. Architecturally, its restrained Colonial Revival finish follows the typical division of such tall buildings into the three parts of a classical pillar: a sturdy two-story base; a simply detailed six-story shaft; and a one-story capital, which displays an abundance of decoration.
- Nissen Building, Winston-Salem, North Carolina (1927): This 20-story structure at 310 West 4th Street was built as an office building. It was named after a local entrepreneur who lived in a suite on the top floor. The entire building was converted into apartments in 2002, and is listed on the National Register of Historic Places.
- Independence Building (addition and renovation), Charlotte, North Carolina (1928): This office building, located at 100 West Trade Street, was initially designed by Frank P. Milburn as a 12-story building and opened in 1909. Stoddart was responsible for two additional floors and interior renovations in 1928. The building was demolished in 1981 despite its listing on the National Register of Historic Places.
- Daniel Boone Hotel, Charleston, West Virginia (1927–1929): This classical revival structure is 10 or 12 stories (sources differ). In 1936 and 1949 additions were constructed. In the 1980s it was converted into an office building and renamed 405 Capitol Street. The building is listed on the National Register of Historic Places.
- Lord Baltimore Hotel', Baltimore (1928): The style of this 22-story hotel has been described as Renaissance revival by some and French Second Empire by others. Located at 20 West Baltimore Street, The Lord Baltimore Hotel is owned by Rubell Hotels. In addition, it is a member of the Historic Hotels of America and is listed on the National Register of Historic Places.
- Abraham Lincoln Hotel, Reading, Pennsylvania (1930): This 16-story structure is located at Fifth and Washington Streets. The building has been converted into apartments. It is listed on the National Register of Historic Places.

== Personal life ==
Stoddart married Mary Elizabeth Powell in Atlanta in 1898, and they settled in Maywood, New Jersey. After approximately a decade of living together, they separated, which became the subject of scandal in the New York newspapers. On November 1, 1909, Mary Stoddart sued for divorce alleging "extreme cruelty." William Stoddart filed a countersuit, alleging that his wife's attraction to one of his friends, Robert L. Shape, had led to the marital breakdown. During this era, marital breakdowns were considered scandalous, and The New York Times published three intimately personal letters from Mrs. Stoddart to Mr. Stoddart, in which she begged for a legal separation and financial support.

According to Stoddart's obituary, the divorce occurred in 1908. However, when one considers the two articles published in 1909, describing the divorce lawsuit and countersuit, it is likely that 1909 was the year the divorce was actually finalized.

On July 19, 1923, at Asheville, North Carolina, William Stoddart remarried. His second wife, Sabra (Wheless) Ballinger, died eleven years later.

Stoddart spent his final years in Larchmont, New York, and died of a stroke on October 2, 1940, at the age of 71 at a New Rochelle hospital.

== Writings by Stoddart ==
- Stoddart, W.L. (1923). "The hotel for the typical American city". Architectural Forum. 39 (5): 245–252. ISSN 0003-8539.
- Stoddart, W.L. (1924). Planning the New Hotel. New York: Ahrens.
- Stoddart, W.L. (1926). "Designing the small city hotel". Architectural Forum. 44 (2): 109–128. ISSN 0003-8539.
- Stoddart, W.L. (1930). "The hotel for the small city". Architectural Forum. 53 (4): 485–492. ISSN 0003-8539.
