= Hotel Dempsey =

Former hotel in Macon, Georgia

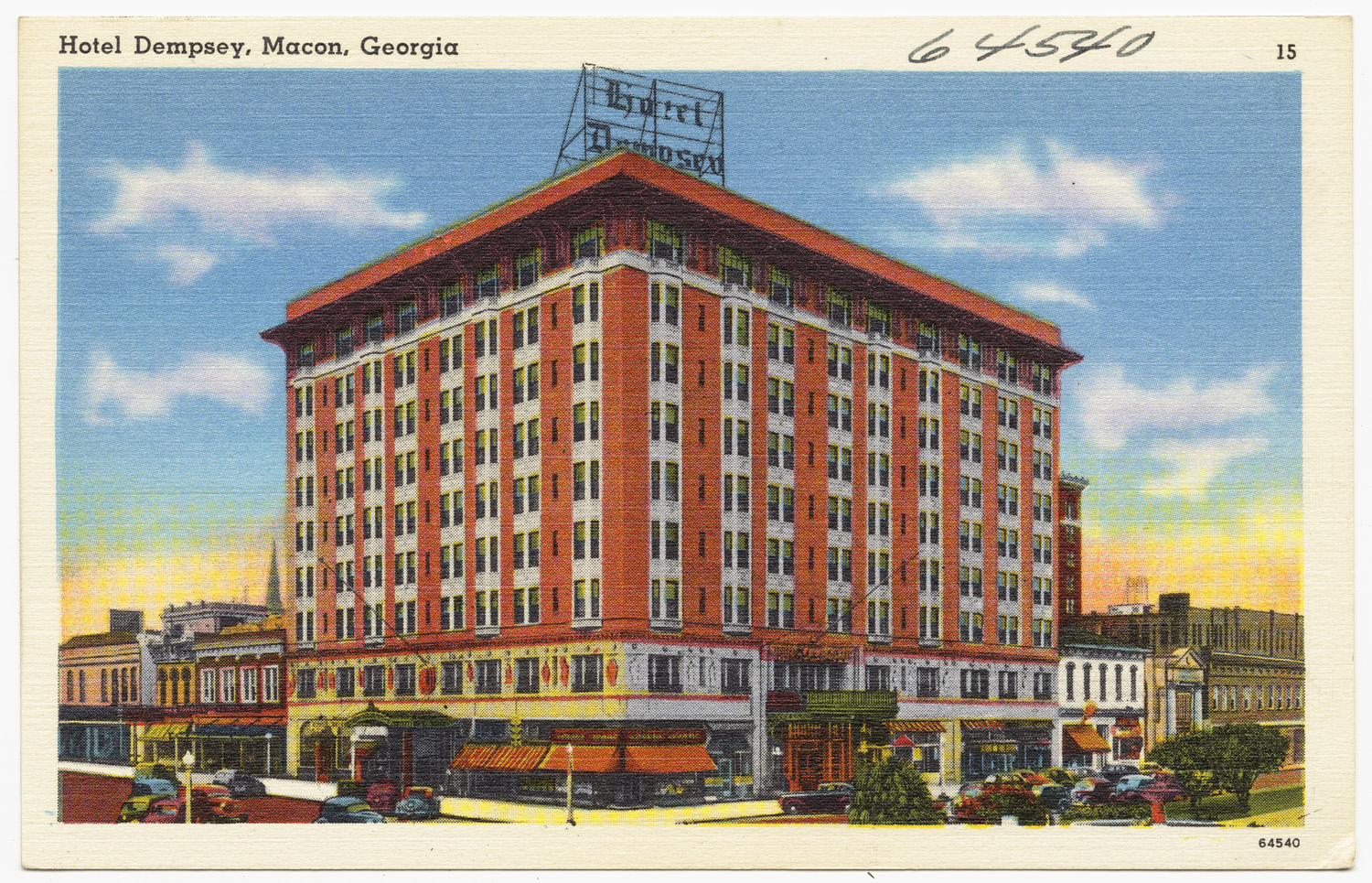
- Alternative names: The Dempsey; Dempsey Motor Hotel

General information
- Location: Macon, Georgia, U.S.
- Opened: March 12, 1913
- Owner: Hotel Dempsey Company

Design and construction
- Architect(s): William Lee Stoddart
- Main contractor: Gray-Wimmer Company

Hotel Dempsey was a hotel in Macon, Georgia. Designed by renowned architect William Lee Stoddart in 1912, the 8-story building opened in 1913.

== History ==
The Hotel Dempsey Company was incorporated on April 23, 1912, for a twenty-year period. The Georgia Chamber of Commerce and local press led a campaign that influenced hundreds of Macon citizens to subscribe to the hotel's stock.

The construction of the Hotel Dempsey, a luxury hotel building, began in 1912. It was originally an eight-story corner building with commercial space below and a rooftop sign bearing the name "Hotel Dempsey." Located at 523 Cherry Street, the building occupied the corner with Third Street.

The hotel was designed by New York architect William Lee Stoddart. It was modeled after Atlanta's Georgian Terrace Hotel, with some differences in its exterior. The contractor was Gray-Wimmer Construction Company. R. S. Hubbell, the former assistant manager of the Waldorf-Astoria and the Dempsey's manager-in-chief, spent six months overseeing preparations. He guided the hotel's progress from framework to completion and personally directed and ordered the installation of its equipment.

The hotel was the product of over a year's work, during which hundreds were employed and millions in Macon investment capital were used for labor. The building cost $200,000, while the leased ground was valued at the same amount, making it a half-million-dollar project. The building was made with fireproof materials. The only wood used was in the windows, doors, and trim, with concrete floors covered in Hartford sultana velvet. It was designed to include all modern conveniences found in New York hotels. There were 225 rooms, each one with a bay window, and 125 of them with a bath. The bathrooms had tiled flooring and walls. Located on the ninth floor overlooking Third Street, the grand ballroom doubled as a roof garden in summer. It seated 500–600 with a stage, or 400 for banquets, and was used for conventions and dancing. Nearby were rest and lounging rooms for ladies.

The Hotel Dempsey officially opened on March 12, 1913. Among the notable guests at the grand opening were George C. Boldt, then proprietor of the Waldorf-Astoria, and Oscar Tschirky, its general manager.

All employees, from cooks to waiters and maids, were white, a practice regarded as innovative in the South then. With 279 on its payroll, the Dempsey's staff included 25 maids, 18 bellboys, and 20 waiters.

The Georgia Chamber of Commerce's first Board of Directors meeting was held at the Hotel Dempsey on September 16, 1913.

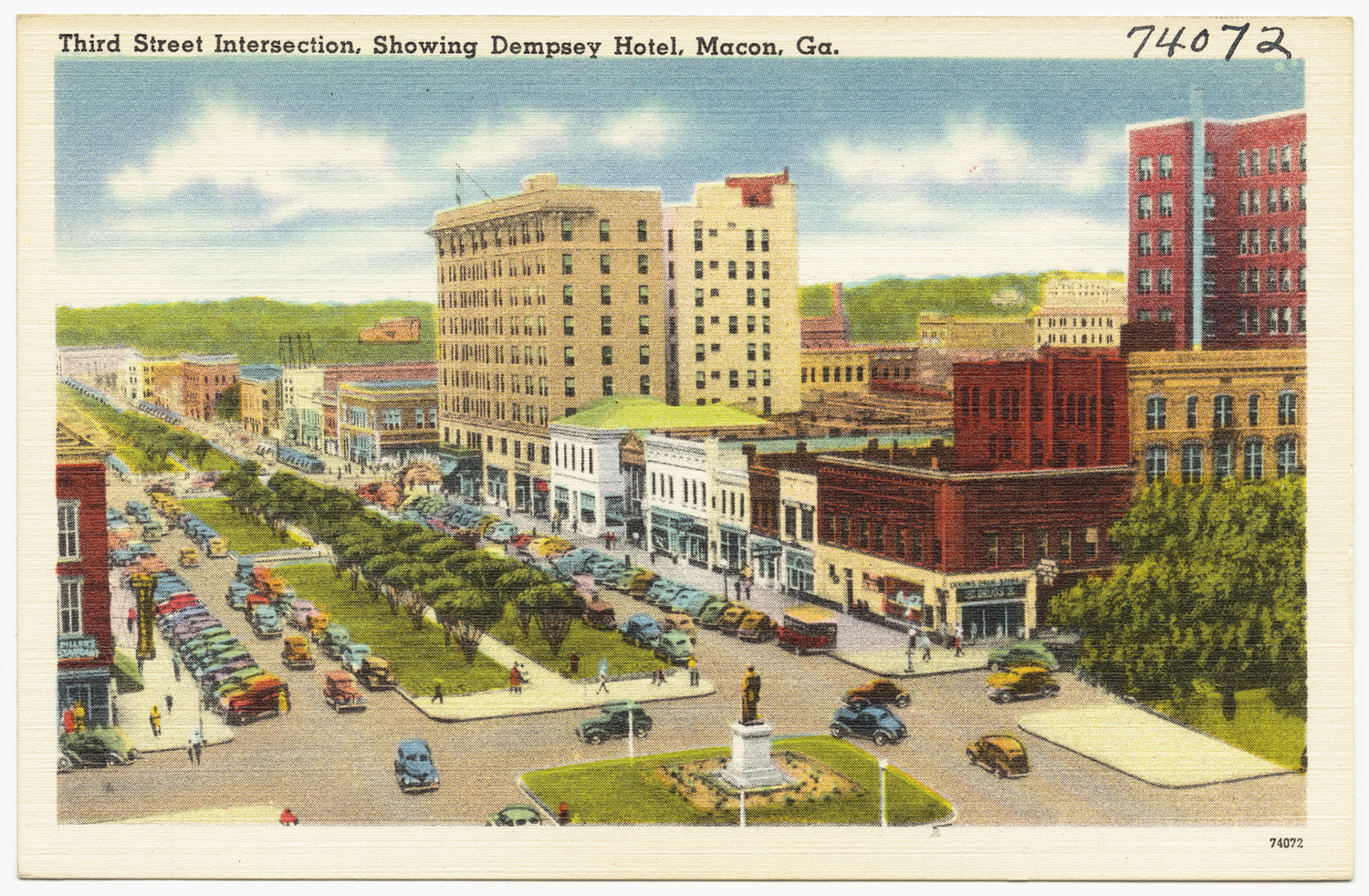
Third Street intersection, showing Dempsey Hotel, Macon, Georgia

The first steps for a 125-room expansion of the Hotel Dempsey were taken in August 1930, with property deeds from Thomas C. Dempsey filed in Bibb Superior Court.

Its charter was renewed for another twenty years on February 3, 1932.

During World War II, the Dempsey accommodated military personnel and the Red Cross, later transforming into the Dempsey Motor Hotel in the 1950s. An 11-story parking garage was added to the hotel in late 1950.

It passed through eight owners during a six-year span in the 1970s.

The Dempsey was bought in 1983 by Boston's Barkan Companies, aided by the Federal Department, Urban Development, and Bibb County. The building became Dempsey Apartments, offering 194 low-income units for seniors, the disabled, and other residents with government assistance. The property sold for $4.5 million in 2018.
