= Hotel Charlotte (Charlotte, North Carolina) =

Demolished building in North Carolina, US

- U.S. National Register of Historic Places
- Hotel Charlotte in Charlotte, North Carolina

- Location within North Carolina Location within the United States
- Location: 327 W. Trade St., Charlotte, North Carolina, U.S.
- Coordinates: 35°13′43″N 80°50′44″W
- Built: 1924
- Built by: J.A. Jones
- Architect: William Lee Stoddart
- Demolished: November 6, 1988
- NRHP reference No.: 79003344
- Added to NRHP: July 2, 1979

The Hotel Charlotte was a 13-story, 250-room hotel on the corner of Trade Street and Poplar Street in the Uptown area of Charlotte, North Carolina. It opened on March 10, 1924 and was demolished in 1988.

The hotel was designed by William Lee Stoddart and was a steel-frame building sheathed with sections of gray granite and buff-colored brick. It was renamed the Queen Charlotte Hotel on December 23, 1961, and then the White House Inn on October 7, 1966. It closed on December 31, 1973.

The vacant structure was listed on the National Register of Historic Places on July 2, 1979.

In the years following its closure, attempts were made to find developers who could rehabilitate and preserve the structure. However, as the building languished, it was severely vandalized and much of its interior plumbing and wiring stolen by looters. The building was imploded on November 6, 1988. David Copperfield used the implosion as the setting for his escape in the TV special The Explosive Encounter.

A restaurant of the same name was created in its honor and reused many interior pieces from the original hotel. The restaurant ceased operations on January 29, 2011.
