= Allegro Resorts Corporation =

Defunct hotel operator

The Allegro Resorts Corporation was a major hotel operator and one of the pioneers in all-inclusive travel industry. At its height, Allegro owned 27 properties in the Dominican Republic, Antigua, Morocco, Aruba, Turks and Caicos, Mexico, Venezuela, Jamaica, Costa Rica, Tunisia, St. Kitts and Egypt. The brand portfolio was composed of Caribbean Village, Allegro Resorts, Royal Hideaway and Jack Tar.

== Operational structure ==
Allegro's operations were grouped into the following segments:

- Allegro Resorts Management Services – hotel management company
- Allegro Hotel Advisors – sales offices
- Allegro Marketing Corporation – marketing offices
- Allegro Vacation Club – timeshare division

On September 13, 2000, the company was acquired by Occidental Hotels & Resorts in a $435.2 million transaction. Allegro Hotels and Occidental Hotels & Resorts are now owned by the Barceló Hotel Group.
