= Fifth Third Center =

Fifth Third Center may refer to the following buildings:

- Fifth Third Center (Cincinnati)
- Fifth Third Center (Charlotte)
- Fifth Third Center (Chicago)
- Fifth Third Center (Cleveland)
- Fifth Third Center (Columbus)
- Fifth Third Center (Dayton)
- Fifth Third Center (Evansville)
- Fifth Third Center (Nashville)
- Fifth Third Center (Tampa)
- Fifth Third Center at One SeaGate
