= Controlled demolition =

Controlled demolition refers to:

- Building implosion, the strategic placing of explosive material and timing of its detonation so that a structure collapses on itself
- Demolition, the tearing-down of buildings and other structures
- Controlled Demolition, Inc., Phoenix, Maryland firm that specializes in the use of explosives to create a controlled demolition of a structure
