= List of tallest buildings in Evansville =

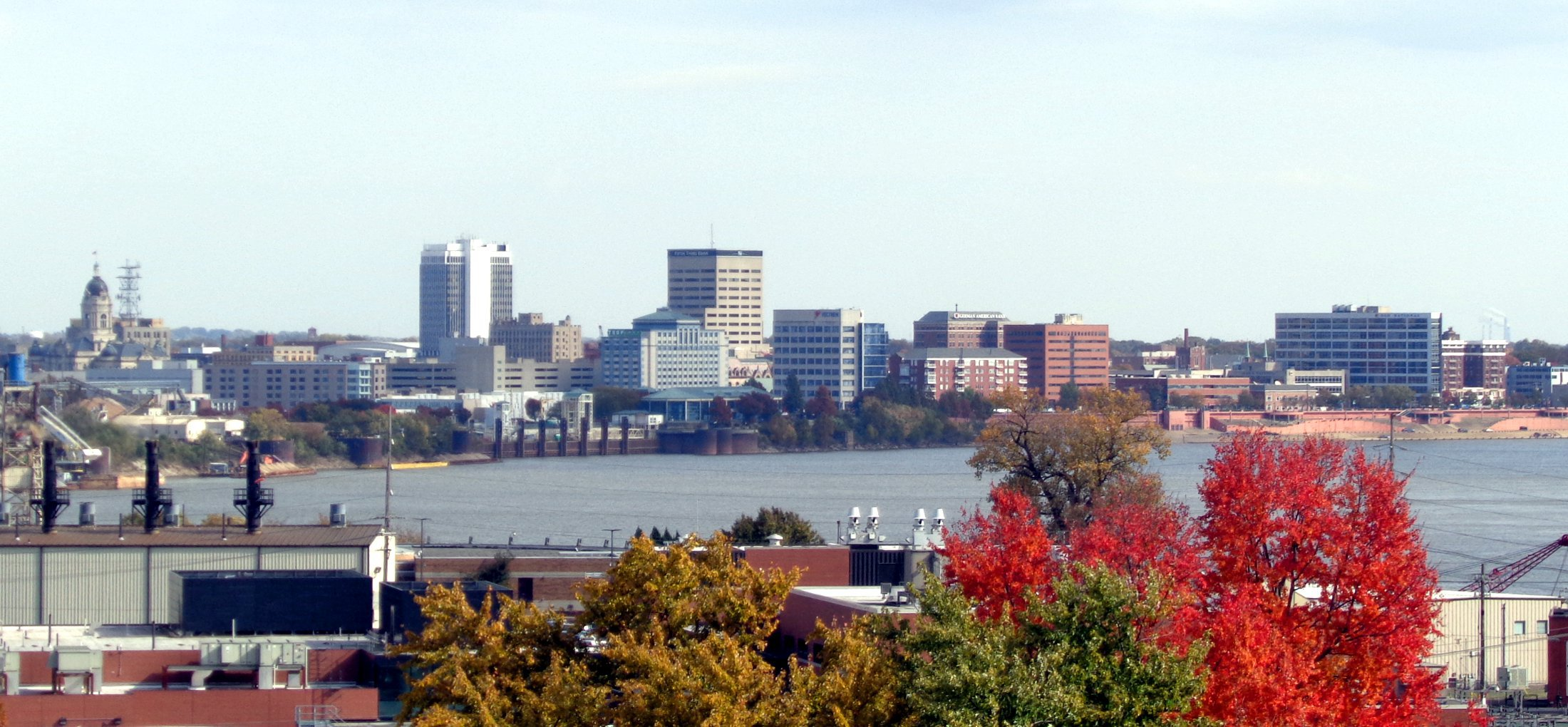
The 2018 Evansville skyline as seen from Dreier Boulevard (Use cursor to identify buildings)

This list of tallest buildings in Evansville ranks skyscrapers and high-rises in the U.S. city of Evansville, Indiana, United States, by height. The city's tallest building is Fifth Third Center, which rises 226 feet (69 m) and was completed in 1981. It is the tallest building between the cities of Indianapolis, Nashville, St. Louis, and Louisville. The previous tallest building in the city was the 18-story 248-feet (76 m) 420 Main Building which was completed in 1970. It was demolished via implosion on November 21, 2021, to make way for mixed-use redevelopment.

== Tallest buildings ==
This list ranks completed Evansville buildings that stand at least 125 feet (38 m) tall, based on standard height measurement. This height includes spires and architectural details but does not include antenna masts. An equal sign (=) following a rank indicates the same height between two or more buildings. The "Year" column indicates the year of completion.

| Rank | Name | Image | Height ft (m) | Floors | Year | Notes |
|---|---|---|---|---|---|---|
| 1 | Fifth Third Center | EvansvilleSkyline (cropped) | 226 (69) | 16 | 1981 | A crane cable lifting a 25-ton concrete column snapped during construction, causing it to fall to the ground. It crushed a passing car, leaving both occupants with minor injuries; Formerly known as Citizens National Bank Building and Civitas Building |
| 2 | Old Vanderburgh County Courthouse | Old Vanderburgh County Courthouse, Evansville, IN, US | 216 (66) | 5 | 1890 | Added to the National Register of Historic Places in 1970 |
| 3 | St. Boniface Catholic Church | St Boniface Church, Evansville | 202 (62) | — | 1882 | |
| 4 | St. Mary Catholic Church | St. Mary's Church - Evansville, Indiana | 175 (53) | — | 1867 | Added to the National Register of Historic Places in 1982 |
| 5 | Kunkel Square | Hilliard-Lyons Building, Evansville, IN | 155 (47) | 12 | 1916 | Added to the National Register of Historic Places in 1982; Formerly known as Citizens National Bank Building and Hilliard-Lyons Building |
| 6 | German American Bank | | 151 (46) | 9 | 1998 | Formerly known as National City Bank Building, Integra Bank Building, and First Security Bank |
| 7 | St. Anthony Catholic Church | | 150 (46) | — | 1896 | |
| 8 | Bally's Evansville | Aztar hotel | 150 (46) | 12 | 1996 | Formerly known as Casino Aztar Hotel |
| 9 | Old National Place | Old National Place, Evansville, IN | 144 (44) | 8 | 2004 | Tallest building completed in Indiana during 2004; First high-rise in Indiana designed with LEED principles |
| 10 | CenterPoint Energy Plaza | | 136 (41) | 8 | 2005 | Tallest building completed in Indiana during 2005; Formerly known as One Vectren Square |
| 11 | Hulman Building | Central Union Bank | 134 (41) | 10 | 1930 | Added to the National Register of Historic Places in 1982; Former headquarters of Vectren; Formerly known as Central Union Bank Building and Southern Indiana Gas & Electric Company Building |
| 12 | St. Benedict's Cathedral | St. Benedict Cathedral - Evansville, Indiana 01 | 131 (40) | — | 1928 | One of Evansville's largest churches, seating approximately 1,100 worshipers |
| 13 | One Riverfront Place | | 128 (39) | 9 | 1985 | |
| 14 | AT&T Building | Indiana Bell Building in Evansville | 125 (38) | 7 | 1929 | Added to the National Register of Historic Places in 1982; First four floors were constructed in 1929, with three additional floors following in 1956; Formerly known as Indiana Bell Building |

== Timeline of tallest buildings ==
(Under development, coming soon)

== Notes ==
(Under development, coming soon)
