= Gettysburg National Tower =

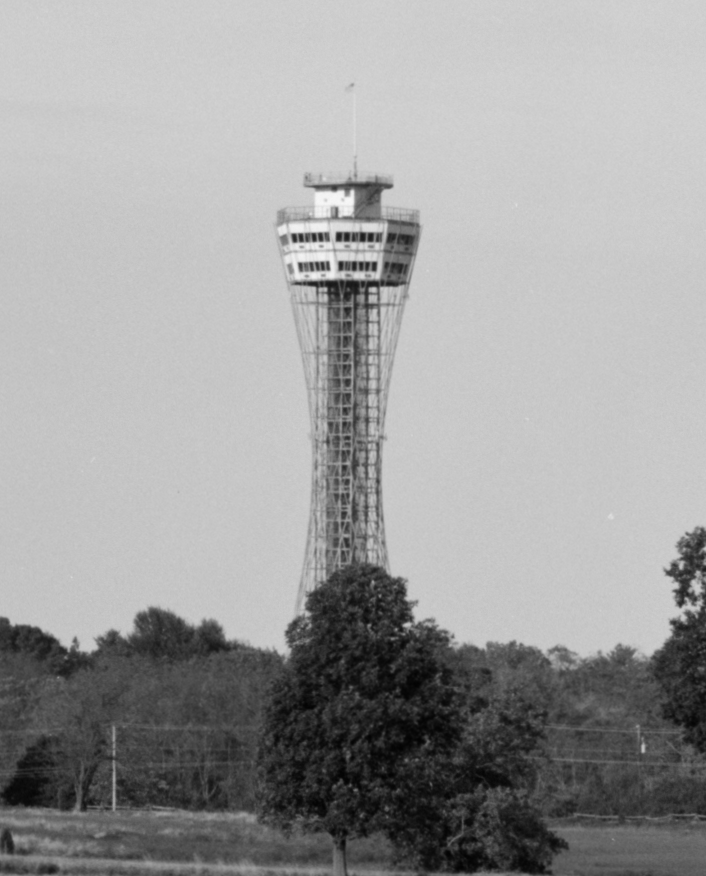
- Gettysburg National Tower as seen from the southwest

- Location within Pennsylvania

General information
- Status: Demolished
- Type: Observation tower
- Location: Gettysburg, Pennsylvania, United States
- Coordinates: 39°49′0.3″N 77°13′42.2″W
- Construction started: 1972
- Completed: 1974
- Opening: July 29, 1974
- Closed: 2000
- Demolished: July 3, 2000
- Cost: $2.5 million USD

Height
- Antenna spire: 120 m (390 ft)
- Top floor: 94 m (307 ft)

Technical details
- Floor count: 4
- Lifts/elevators: 2

Design and construction
- Developer: Thomas R. Ottenstein

The Gettysburg National Tower was a 307-foot (94 m) hyperboloid observation tower that overlooked the Gettysburg National Military Park and Gettysburg, Pennsylvania, from 1974 to 2000. The privately owned tower attracted many of the battlefield's visitors, who paid a fee to access its observation decks.

Controversial even before it opened, the structure was eventually seized by eminent domain and demolished.

== History ==
The Gettysburg National Tower was built in 1974 by real-estate developer Thomas R. Ottenstein on private land that was adjacent to the Gettysburg National Military Park. It was opposed by many, during its planning phase, including the National Park Service, historic preservationists, local residents, and Milton Shapp, the governor of Pennsylvania from 1971 to 1979, who led unsuccessful lawsuits to try to halt the tower's construction. The National Park Service had been unable to prevent construction of the tower because it had no authority over the structure since it was not being erected on national park land.

When proposing his idea in 1970, Ottenstein observed that "the Park Service does not pay local taxes of any kind," and said that property taxes and admissions would raise considerable revenues for the city of Gettysburg. He also argued that "many local leaders have expressed themselves substantially in favor of it," adding:

"Just after the Civil War ended, a memorial Association constructed a wooden observation tower strategically on East Cemetery Hill so that people...could have a realistic overview of the area.... So popular was this tower that in 1895, the Federal government authorized the erection of four additional steel observation towers on the Battlefield. The public's continued enthusiasm was so favorable that in 1896 an additional fifth tower was erected by the Federal Battlefield Commission. The 1896 Annual Report to the commission praised the towers.... We are happy to report that visitors in great numbers from all sections of our own country, as well as from abroad, are constantly thronging these historic grounds and tracing out the complicated phrases of the titanic struggle."

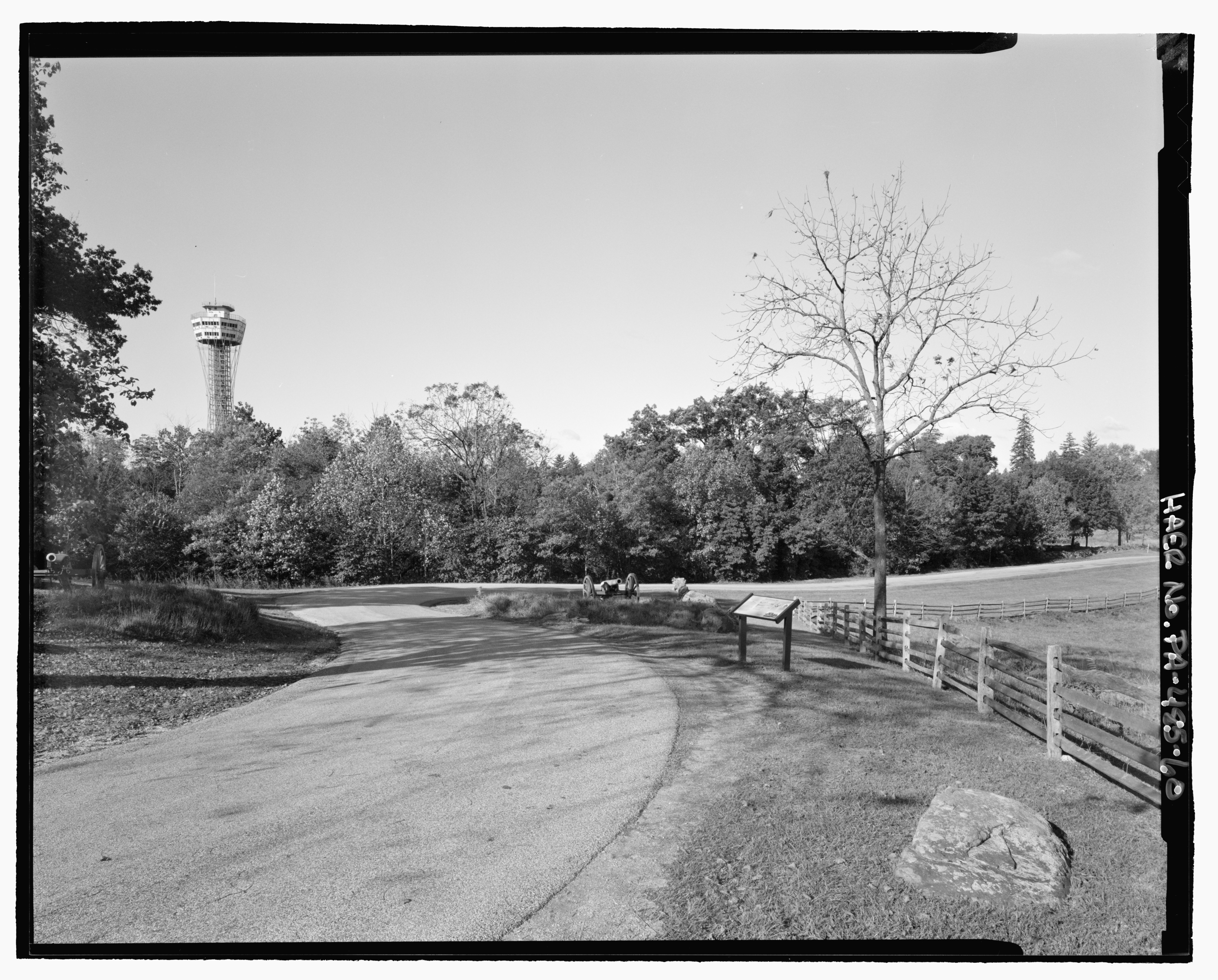
Slocum Avenue view of the Gettysburg National Tower and Cemetery Hill

By late 1970, Ottsenstein obtained a one-hundred-and-eighty-day option to purchase the construction site plus necessary state and local permits. Initially planning to build the tower at 777 Baltimore Street, he changed the site to Colt Park at Johns Avenue, despite the fact that his original permit was not automatically transferable. Later, with support from the National Park Service, he chose a wooded area east of the visitor center as his final site, and transferred the Colt Park site to the park service for $62,150, agreeing to "set up a non-profit corporation or foundation with five percent of the taxable income from the tower to support historic interests of the National Park Service."

In July 1971, the State of Pennsylvania won a temporary injunction, halting construction. Despite further appeals, an Adams County judge dismissed all project objections via a final judicial ruling, and construction was allowed to proceed.

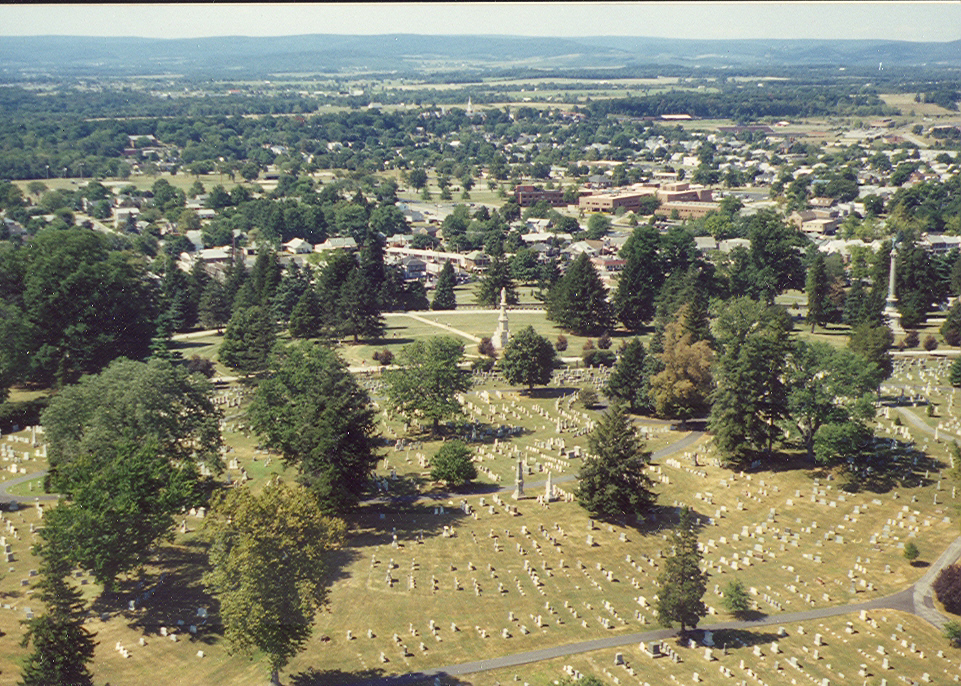
National Cemetery and downtown Gettysburg viewed from the top of the tower, 1995

In 1990, a new law was passed, which made the land on which the tower stood part of the national park in Gettysburg. A decade later, in June 2000, a federal judge gave park officials permission to seize the tower itself, and three million dollars was subsequently awarded to the owners as compensation for the seizure.

On July 3, 2000 at 5:03 p.m., the Gettysburg National Tower was demolished with explosives by Controlled Demolition, Inc. for the National Park Service. The demolition occurred on the 137th anniversary of the final day of the Battle of Gettysburg. The public was invited to attend the event, which was staged to make it appear as though cannon fire had caused the tower to fall.

== Construction and design ==
The tower had a patented hyperboloid design, which was checked by computer simulation on a CDC 6600 mainframe to verify its integrity. The bottom diameter was 94 feet (29 m), it narrowed to 36 feet (11 m) in the middle, and spread outward for a top diameter of 78 feet (24 m). The main pieces were assembled using the largest crane available at the time and were bolted together rather than welded. During the debate regarding the tower, its engineer, Joel Rosenblatt, and architect Archie Brillhart, argued that its design was significant enough for preservation in its own right.

Running up inside the hyperbolic lattice were elevators and a 520-step staircase leading to the observation decks. The observation area consisted of two air-conditioned indoor levels and two open-air decks at the very top, featuring binoculars and information about the historical significance of the sights. Ottenstein hailed it as a "classroom in the sky", but detractors said its size and visibility made it overly prominent.
