= Omega Tower Trelew =

Trelew Omega Mast
- Interactive map of the Trelew Omega Mast area

General information
- Status: Destroyed
- Type: Mast radiator insulated against ground
- Location: Trelew, Argentina
- Coordinates: 43°3′13″S 65°11′27″W
- Completed: 1976
- Destroyed: June 23, 1998

Height
- Height: 366 m (1,201 ft)

Design and construction
- Main contractor: US Coast Guard

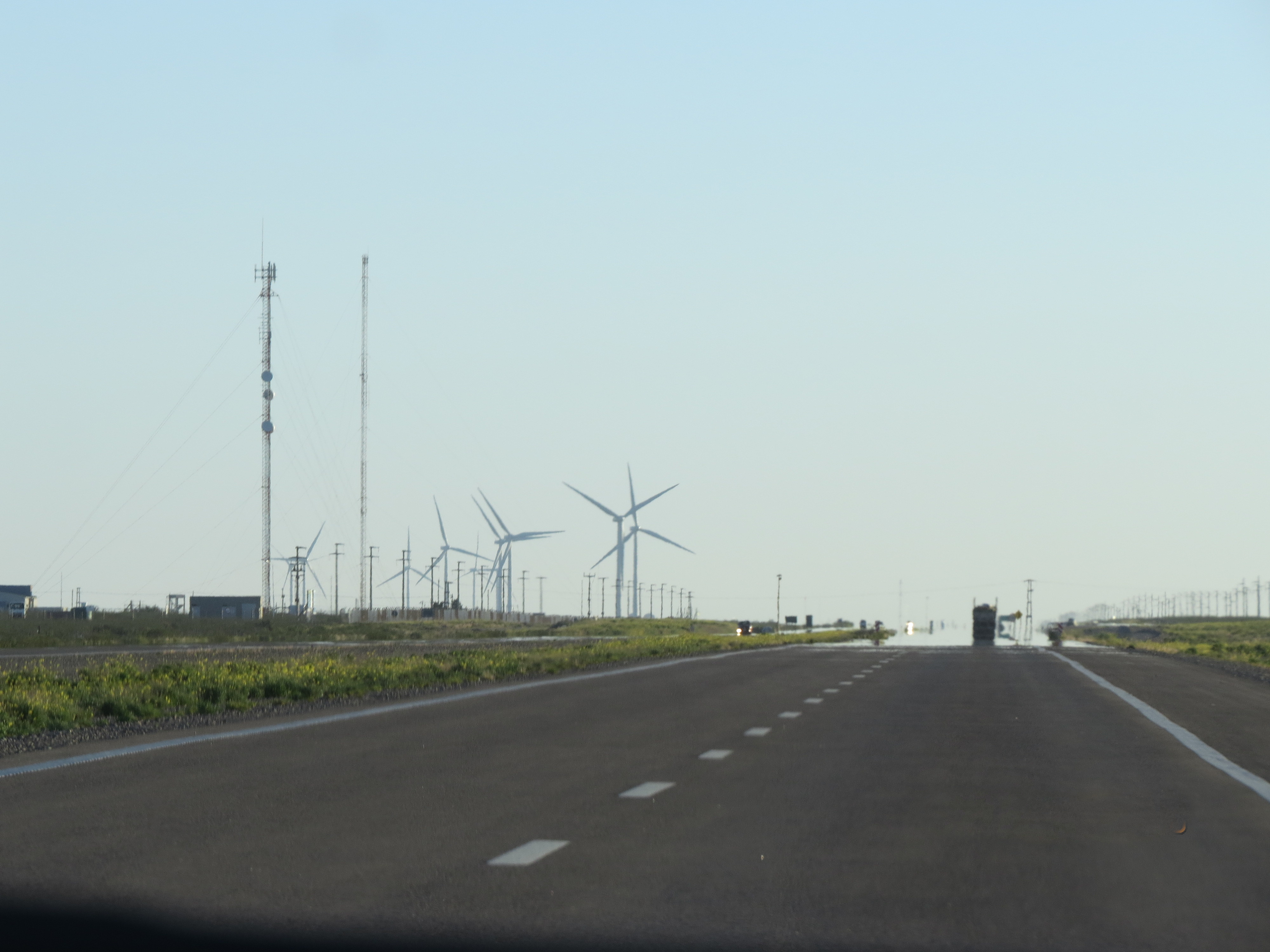
Predio ex Torre Omega Trelew

Trelew Omega Transmitter (station F) situated at Golfo Nuevo, 40 km outside Trelew, Argentina at 43.053553°S 65.190781°W was a grounded 366 m high steel guyed mast antenna, which was the tallest construction in South America. It was imploded as part of a project conducted by Controlled Demolition, Inc. on June 23, 1998.

== See also ==
- OMEGA Navigation System
