= Aldine Square, Chicago =

Former neighborhood of Chicago

Coordinates: 41°49′36″N 87°36′50″W

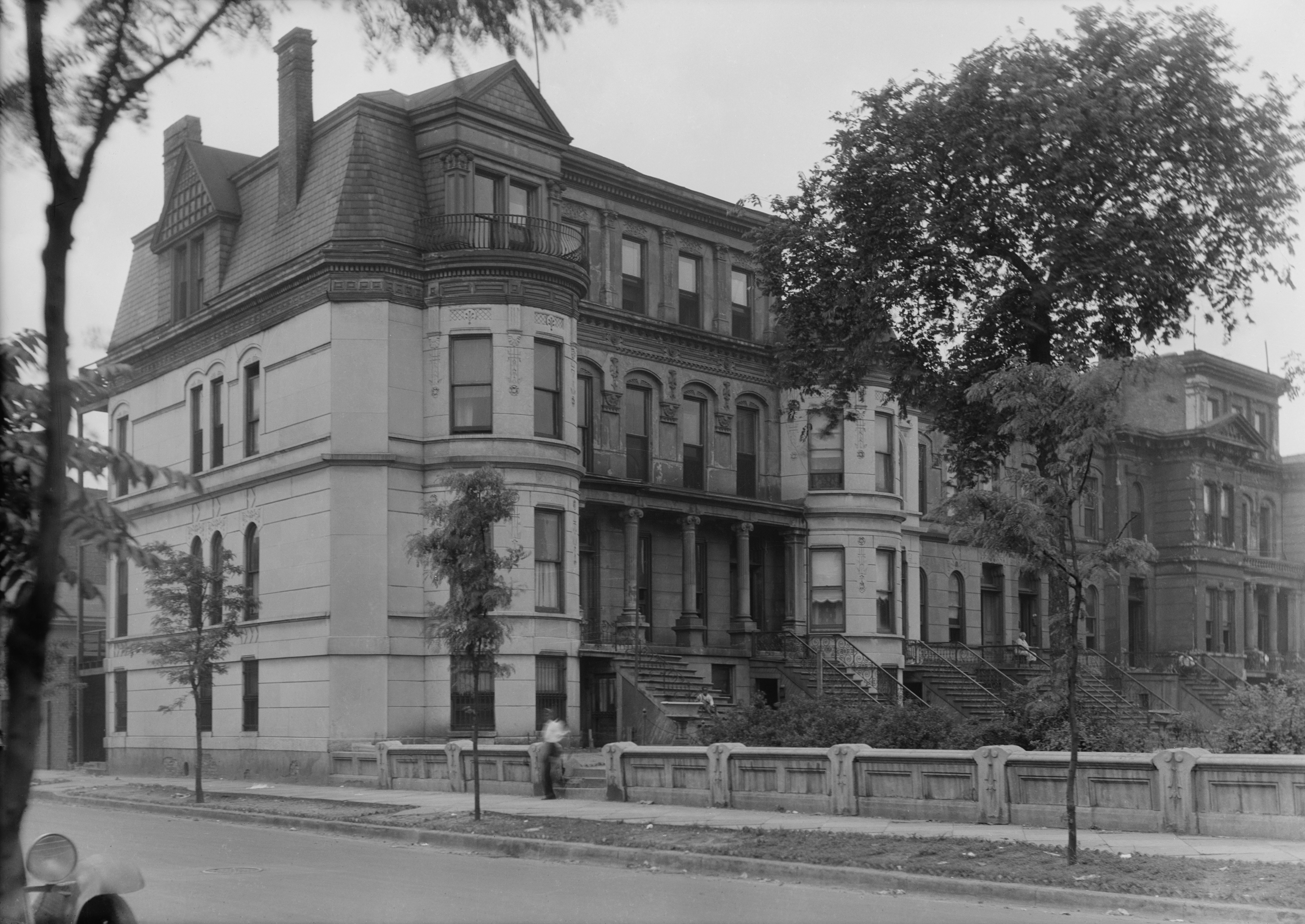
Aldine Square in August 1935, view from Vincennes Avenue. Depicted are six houses (539 through 549 Aldine Square) and a portion of the park.

Aldine Square was a residential neighborhood of Oakland, Chicago, that existed from 1874 until it was demolished in 1938 to make way for the Ida B. Wells Homes. It comprised 42 brick and limestone houses that surrounded a park with a pond. Originally considered an elegant neighborhood for the wealthy, it had become dilapidated by the 1920s. It and its surroundings were demolished in the 1930s to make way for the homes.

== Construction ==
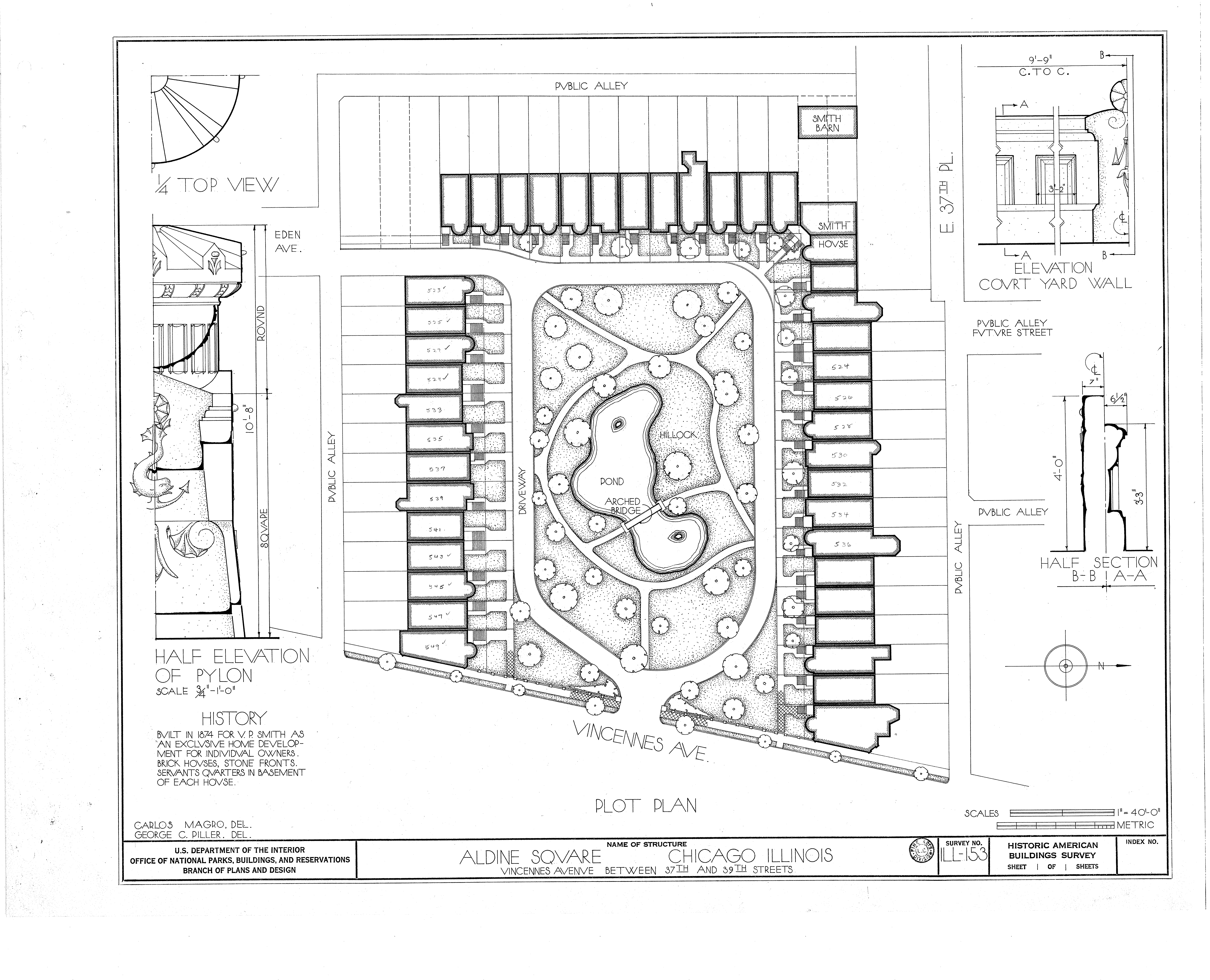
Layout of Aldine Square

Aldine Square was built in 1874. It was constructed by U.P. Smith. The neighborhood was bounded by Vincennes Avenue on the east, Eden Avenue on the west, and 37th and 38th Streets on the north and south. It consisted of 42 houses built of brick and limestone that surrounded a park with a pond in it, and was originally paved with cedar blocks. Houses in the neighborhood carried an "Aldine Square" address. In 1877 the Chicago Tribune referred to it as "the most charming of all the beautiful places of residence in the city." Its elegance was considered to have peaked in the 1880s.

== Transition and demolition ==
Jelly Roll Morton lived at 545 Aldine Square in 1918. Former residents of the neighborhood held a reunion at the La Salle Hotel in 1929, by which time the neighborhood had become primarily inhabited by African-Americans and the buildings dilapidated. On October 25, 1934, it was announced that a new housing project would be constructed in the vicinity, which was the second such project in Chicago and would entail the condemnation of the properties of the area, including Aldine Square. The Federal Government sent photographers to document the neighborhood between 1934 and 1936. The neighborhood was demolished in 1938 for the construction of the Ida B. Wells Homes, along with the rest of the vicinity. A replica of Aldine Square was exhibited at a March 1939 flower show at Navy Pier; at that time the pylons at the entrance of the neighborhood and the park itself were still standing, but only the foundations of the houses remained.
