= Controlled Demolition, Inc. =

American demolition company

Controlled Demolition, Inc. (CDI) is a controlled demolition firm headquartered in Phoenix, Maryland. The firm was founded by Jack Loizeaux who used dynamite to remove tree stumps in the Baltimore, Maryland area, and moved on to using explosives to take down chimneys, overpasses and small buildings in the 1940s. The company has demolished several notable buildings by implosion, including the Gettysburg National Tower, the Seattle Kingdome, the Kingda Ka roller coaster at Six Flags Great Adventure, and the uncollapsed portion of the Champlain Towers South condominium.

== Records ==
The firm has claimed world records for a series of 1998 projects: The June 23 demolition of the 1,201-foot-high Omega Radio Tower in Trelew, Argentina, "the tallest manmade structure ever felled with explosives"; The August 16 implosion of the 17-building Villa Panamericana and Las Orquideas public housing complex in San Juan, Puerto Rico, "the most buildings shot in a single implosion sequence"; and the October 24 project at the J. L. Hudson Department Store in Detroit, Michigan, which at 439 feet (134 m) in height became "the tallest building & the tallest structural steel building ever imploded" and its 2,200,000 square feet (200,000 m^{2}) making it "the largest single building ever imploded".

== Selected projects ==
=== Old Sunshine Skyway Bridge ===
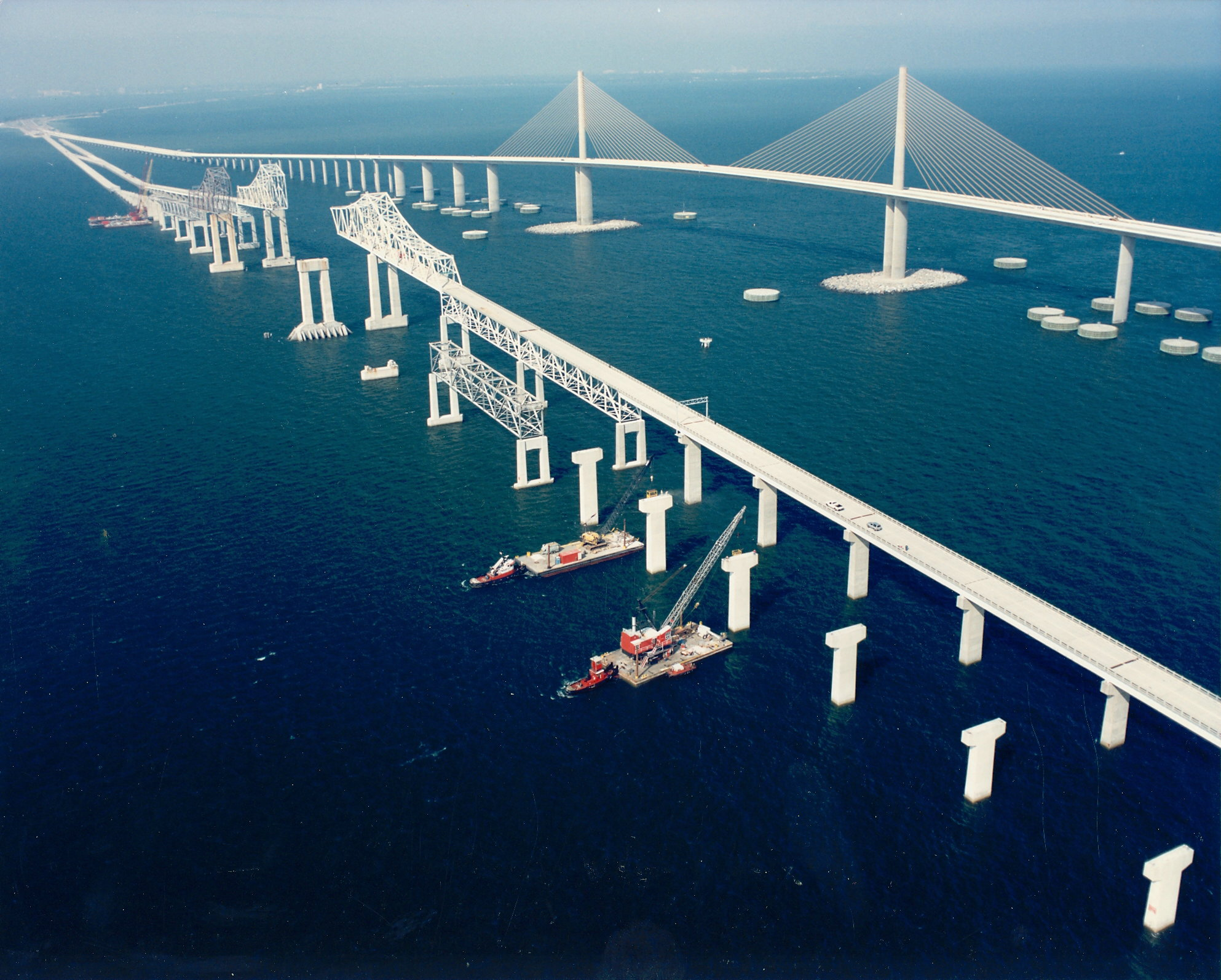
Demolition of steel and concrete girders of the old Sunshine Skyway Bridge, 1990

In 1990, the FDOT awarded a bid to Hardaway Company (owner of Controlled Demolition, Inc.) to demolish all steel and concrete sections of the old Sunshine Skyway spans. The scope of the project required that all underwater piles and piers, and surface roadway, girders, and beams, be dismantled. Special care had to be taken in removing underwater bridge elements near the channel, and the central portion of the original bridge had to be removed in one piece to minimize closure of the only approach to the busy Port of Tampa. Most of the concrete material was used to create an artificial reef near the southbound approach of the old bridge, which was converted into a long pier for newly created Skyway Fishing Pier State Park. Unused approaches to the original spans were demolished in 2008.

=== Alfred P. Murrah Building, Oklahoma City ===
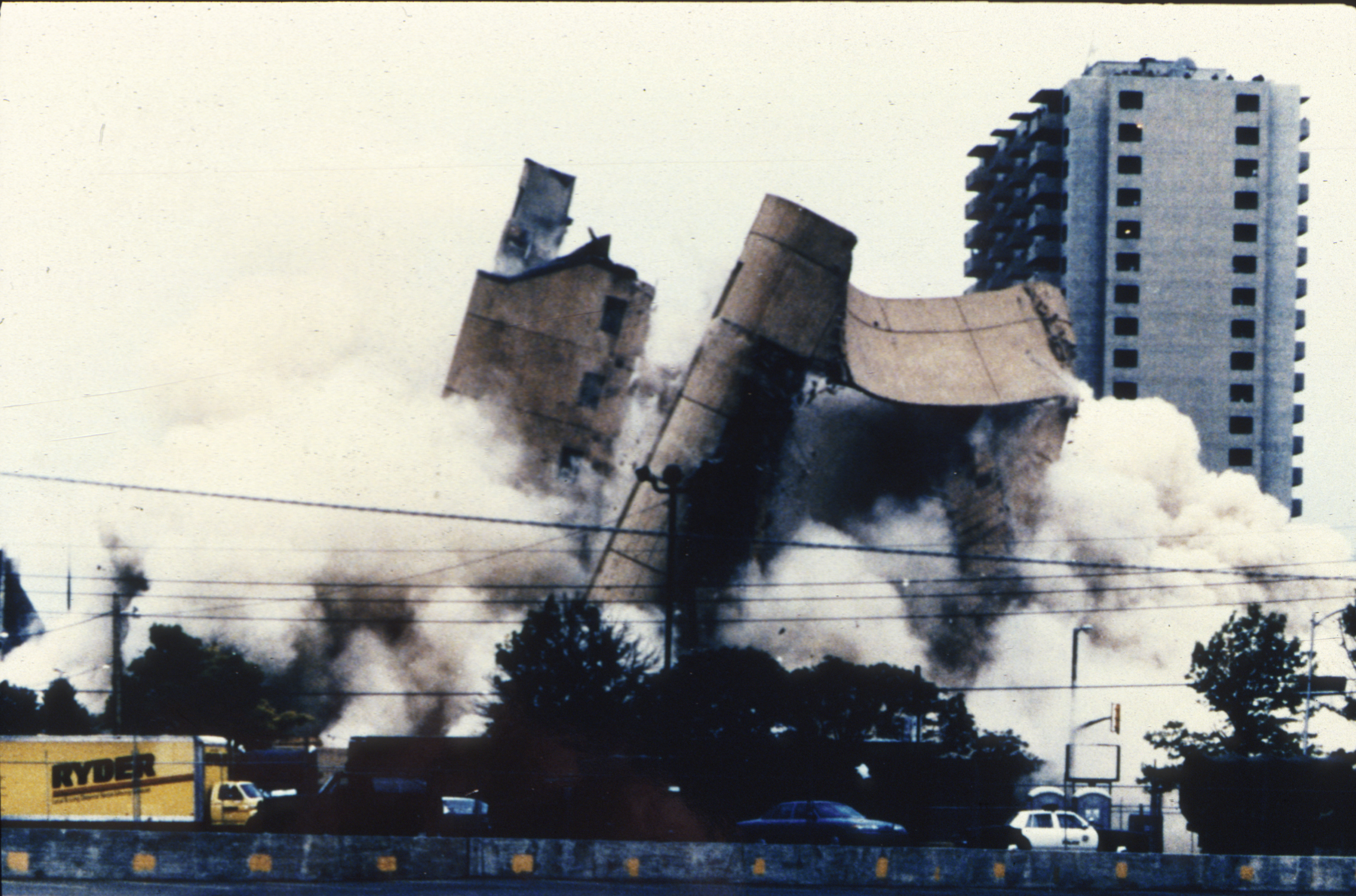
The Alfred P. Murrah Federal Building being demolished on May 23, 1995, over a month after the incident.

On May 23, 1995, the firm was responsible for the demolition of the Alfred P. Murrah Federal Building after its bombing on April 19, 1995.

=== The Seattle Kingdome ===
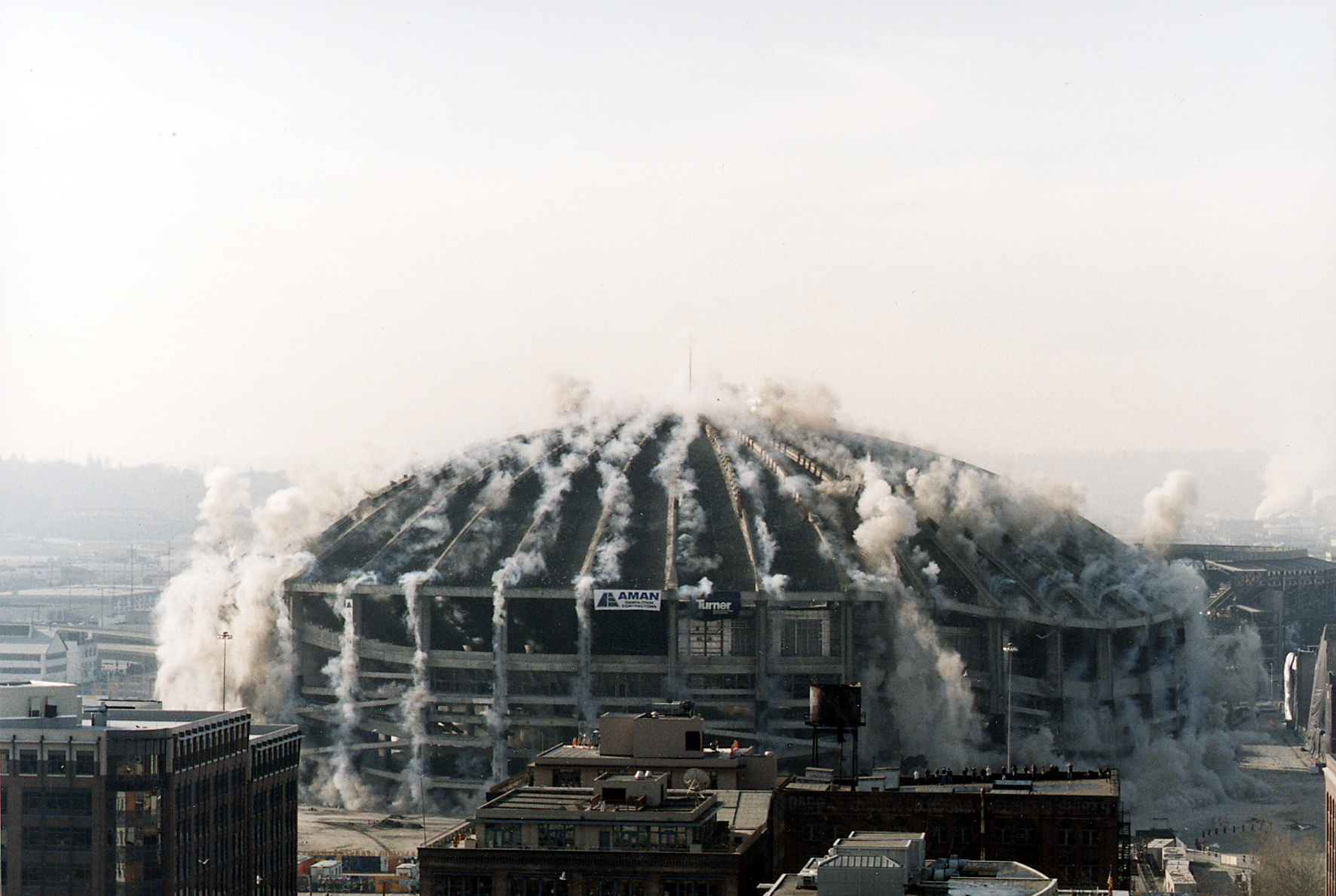
Implosion of the Kingdome, 2000

On March 26, 2000, the firm used 4,450 pounds of dynamite placed in 5,905 carefully sited holes and 21.6 miles (34.8 km) of detonation cord inserted over a period of four months to take down the 25,000-ton concrete roof of the Kingdome in Seattle, Washington in 16.8 seconds, one day before the 24th birthday of the stadium that had been the home of the Seattle Mariners of Major League Baseball and the Seattle Seahawks of the National Football League. The total cost for the demolition project was $9 million. The firm planned the collapse of the roof to prevent its simultaneous free fall, creating a delay pattern that would break the roof into pieces and setting up 15-foot-high earth berms on the floor of the stadium to absorb the impact of the falling concrete. The demolition of the Kingdome established the record for the largest structure, by volume, ever demolished with explosives. The implosion of the 125,000-ton concrete structure did not cause a single crack in the foundation of the new stadium being built 90 feet (27 m) away.

=== Gettysburg National Tower ===
CDI demolished the Gettysburg National Tower on July 3, 2000, which was the 137th anniversary of the final day of the Battle of Gettysburg. The demolition was done for free for the National Park Service. The tower was felled by 12 pounds (5.4 kg) of explosives in front of a crowd of 10,000.

=== World Trade Center site ===
On September 22, 2001, eleven days after the 9/11 attacks, a preliminary cleanup plan for the World Trade Center site was delivered by Controlled Demolition, Inc. in which Mark Loizeaux, president of CDI, emphasized the importance of protecting the slurry wall (known as "the bathtub") which kept the Hudson River from flooding the WTC's basement.

=== Cape Canaveral Air Force Station Space Launch Complex 40 ===
The tower was disassembled during late 2007 and early 2008. Demolition of the Mobile Service Structure (MSS), by means of a controlled explosion, occurred on 2008-04-27. National Geographic Channel: Man Made: Rocket Tower has a full episode on the demolition

=== Martin Tower ===
Martin Tower, the 21-story world headquarters building of defunct Bethlehem Steel and the tallest building in Bethlehem, Pennsylvania, was imploded by Controlled Demolition on May 19, 2019, at a reported cost of $575,000.

=== Champlain Towers South ===
The company was contracted to demolish the remaining portion of the 12-story condominium building near Miami Beach, Florida, after it partially collapsed on June 24, 2021; the work was expedited due to the potential threat of Hurricane Elsa. The demolition occurred on July 4, 2021, after only a day of preparation, including placement of explosives; city officials had feared that the demolition could take weeks. As the still-standing structure was unstable, it was considered unsafe to enter and CDI had originally estimated that the demolition could not occur until the following day, since the work had to be done carefully and slowly to avoid a premature collapse. This risk of collapse and its risk to rescuers warranted the controlled demolition, which was directed away from the original collapse footprint.

=== Tropicana Las Vegas ===
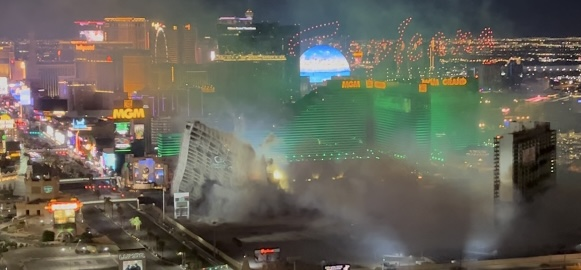
Implosion of the towers of the Tropicana Las Vegas, 2024

The Tropicana Las Vegas was demolished to make way for two new projects: a baseball stadium (tentatively the New Las Vegas Stadium) on nine acres of the site, and a new Bally's Las Vegas resort on the remaining land. The towers of the Tropicana Las Vegas were imploded by CDI on October 9, 2024, at 2:37 a.m. Demolition was preceded by a ceremony featuring LED and pyrotechnic aerial drones, as well as fireworks from Fireworks by Grucci. The aerial show took approximately five months to plan, with a crew of nearly 100 people on-site to execute it.

=== Kingda Ka ===
On February 28, 2025, CDI demolished the top hat tower of the Kingda Ka roller coaster at Six Flags Great Adventure in Jackson, New Jersey.

== Other projects ==
- Manchester Bridge
- Pruitt–Igoe
- Traymore Hotel
- Woodmen of the World Building
- Marlborough-Blenheim Hotel
- Independence Building
- Hotel Manger
- Corbett Building
- Hotel Charlotte
- Dunes Hotel and Casino
- Commonwealth Building
- Landmark Hotel and Casino
- Sands Hotel and Casino
- Hacienda Hotel and Casino
- Farmers Bank Building
- Omni Coliseum
- Aladdin Hotel and Casino
- Omega Tower Trelew
- J. L. Hudson Department Store and Addition
- Lake Michigan High-Rises
- St. Louis Arena
- Mapes Hotel
- El Rancho Hotel and Casino
- Three Rivers Stadium
- Naval Hospital Philadelphia
- Market Square Arena
- Desert Inn
- Capital Centre
- Everglades Hotel
- Baptist Memorial Hospital
- Castaways Hotel and Casino
- Bourbon Street Hotel and Casino
- Boardwalk Hotel and Casino
- Cooling tower at the Trojan Nuclear Power Plant
- Stardust Resort and Casino
- Cooling towers at the Calder Hall nuclear power station
- Sands Atlantic City
- New Frontier Hotel and Casino
- RCA Dome
- Ocean Tower (The Leaning Tower of South Padre Island)
- Estádio Fonte Nova
- Houston Main Building
- Fort Steuben Bridge
- Plaza Hotel
- Grand Palace Hotel
- Innerbelt Bridge
- Queen Lane Apartments
- Clarion Hotel and Casino
- The Gramercy
- Riviera Hotel and Casino
- Clemson House
- Capital Plaza Office Tower
- 505 North Ervay
- The Palace of Auburn Hills
- Trump Plaza Hotel and Casino
- Ferrybridge Power Station sub-contracted by Keltbray Decommissioning
- 420 Main
- Hotel Deauville
- Francis Scott Key Bridge
- Capital One Tower
- Chimney at Alma Station
- Sheraton Crossroads Hotel (Mahwah, New Jersey)
- Eastside Cannery
- Mandarin Oriental, Miami
- Sheraton Arlington Hotel
- Electronic Data Systems
