= Lake Michigan High-Rises =

Residential buildings in Chicago, Illinois

Lake Michigan High–Rises
- 1998 photograph of 3 of 4 high-rises viewed from 41st St. & Lake Shore Drive seconds prior to being demolished by implosion
- Interactive map of Lake Michigan High–Rises

General information
- Location: Bounded by Oakwood Boulevard and 42nd Place and Oakenwald and Lake Park Avenues; Chicago, Illinois, U.S.
- Coordinates: 41°49′16″N 87°36′3″W
- Status: Demolished (4 high–rises; 1998); Renovated (Olander/Lake Parc Place)

Construction
- Constructed: 1962–1963

Listing
- Demolished: December 12, 1998 (implosion)

Other information
- Governing body: Chicago Housing Authority (CHA)

The Lake Michigan High-Rises, also known as Lakefront Homes, was a Chicago Housing Authority (CHA) public housing project in the North Kenwood–Oakland neighborhood located in the South Side of Chicago, Illinois, United States. Constructed in 1962 and completed in 1963, The Lake Michigan High-Rises originally consisted of four 16-story buildings, totaling 457 units. The Lake Michigan High-Rises was located west of Lake Shore Drive and was included as a part of the CHA Lakefront Properties. Today, only two buildings of the Lakefront Properties exist; they were officially renamed from Victor Olander Homes to Lake Parc Place in 1991. The other four high–rises were demolished by implosion in December 1998, it was the first and only to date in Chicago Housing Authority history.

== History ==
Constructed between 1961 and 1963, The buildings were completed in March 1963; consisting of six buildings. The first three buildings (1132 E. 42nd Street, 1130 E. 41st Street and 4155 S. Lake Park Avenue) sat 16–stories high in a u–shape cluster (also known as the Horseshoe buildings) bordered by Lake Park Avenue to the west and Oakenwald Avenue to the east. The other buildings (4040 S. Oakenwald Avenue, which sat 30 yards north from the clustered buildings), and the Victor Olander Homes (which still stands today north of the former Oakenwald building site.)

The Lake Michigan High-Rises were occupied until December 1985; when all but the one building at Oakenwald Avenue were vacated (which was later vacated in January 1986). In May 1985, The Chicago Housing Authority told the residents the buildings would undergo renovation in the coming months and residents would have to be relocated to other CHA sites. Prior to the proposed renovation plans, Residents were opposed to the relocation; fearing they wouldn't be able to return to the buildings. The authority received $14 million grant from Housing and Urban Development (HUD) to begin the renovation process in December 1985. Eleven families at the Oakenwald building refused to leave. According to residents, The housing authority began the process of forcing them out by extreme measures. The authority turned off heat and electricity in the building, Elevators stopped working and pipes burst which led to water freezing on the stairwells. After the electricity and water was turned off, Residents vacated the building in mid-January 1986.

In December 1987, Developer Ferd Kramer submitted a plan to CHA; proposing to demolish four of the six buildings to build new low–rise housing in the area. The Illinois Housing Development Authority supported Kramer's plan. CHA rejected Kramer's proposal, saying it didn't provide a full replacement of the units it proposed to demolish. Then–Mayor Harold Washington opposed the plan, saying the city would keep its promise to renovate and allow former tenants to move back. Shortly after Washington's death, the housing authority halted the renovation efforts and decided to board–up the vacant buildings. In February 1988, The decision was made to demolish the high-rises and replaced them with low-rise scattered-sites. The authority received a $14 million grant from HUD and rehabbed the Victor Olander Homes, renaming the buildings Lake Parc Place in August 1991. Then–CHA director Vince Lane stated that the Oakenwald building would be renovated the following spring with the remaining funds from the grant and the remaining buildings would soon follow the same fate.

== Implosion and Sullivan Station ==
After sitting vacant for 13 years, The Chicago Housing Authority decided to demolish the four buildings by implosion in 1998. Members of the Lakefront Community Organization, a group made up of former residents of the high-rises requested a halting of the implosion to a U.S. judge, citing all the replacement units hadn't been built. The implosion was carried out on December 12, 1998, at 8:18 am by Controlled Demolition, Inc., costing the authority $1.9 million. Today, the site consist of town-homes and mid-rise buildings in a complex named The Sullivan Station, named after a railway station that existed in the area decades before the high-rises were built.
