= 420 Main =

Office in Evansville, Indiana

420 Main Building
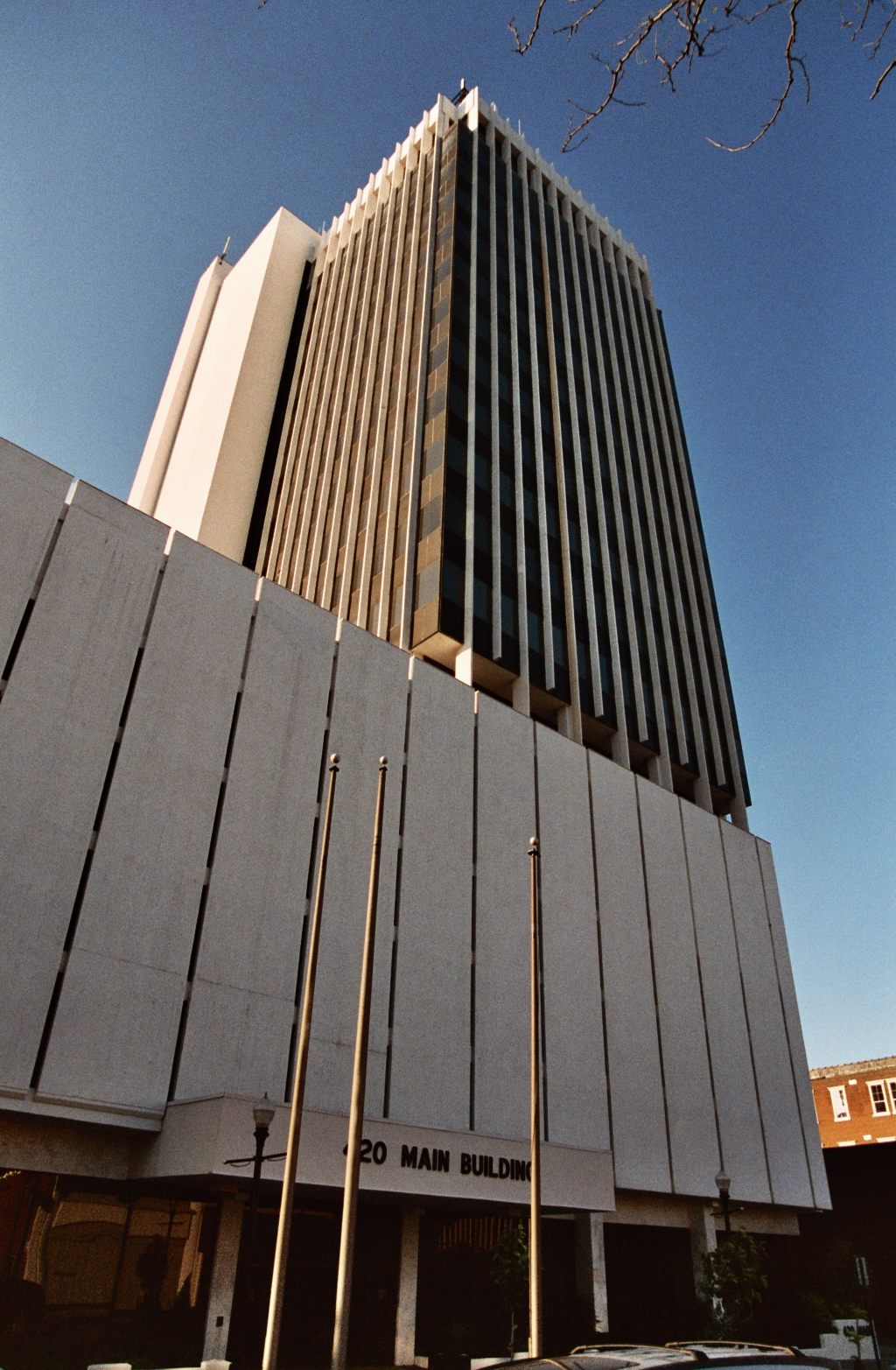
- The building in 2009
- Interactive map of the 420 Main Building area
- Former names: Old National Bank Tower (1970–2004)

General information
- Type: Office
- Architectural style: Modernist
- Location: 420 Main Street, Evansville, Indiana, United States
- Coordinates: 37°58′20″N 87°34′14″W
- Groundbreaking: December 15, 1967
- Construction started: 1968
- Topped-out: May 24, 1969
- Completed: 1970
- Opened: 1970
- Closed: 2016
- Demolished: November 21, 2021
- Cost: $5,000,000

Height
- Roof: 248 feet (76 m)

Technical details
- Floor count: 18
- Lifts/elevators: 4

Design and construction
- Architecture firm: Kelley-Marshall & Associates

Other information
- Parking: 150
- Public transit: METS

The 420 Main Building (previously known as Old National Bank Tower) was a 248-foot, 18-story office building located at 420 Main Street in downtown Evansville, Indiana. The building was the headquarters of the Old National Bank until the bank moved its headquarters to a new location in 2004. The building stood nearly vacant for the next 12 years until it was fully vacant in 2016, and was the tallest building in the city until its demolition in 2021.

== History ==
The building was built as the new headquarters for Old National Bank, serving as a replacement for the Hotel Lincoln and ONB building built in 1916, the previous headquarters of Old National Bank. The ceremonial groundbreaking for the building site took place on December 15, 1967, and foundation work commenced in 1968. A topping out ceremony was held on May 24, 1969, and the building was completed in 1970.

In 2004, the bank moved its headquarters to the new Old National Place, located on One Main Street by the Ohio River riverfront. As a result, the building stood nearly vacant for the next 12 years until it was fully vacant in 2016. In 2015, the building went up for sale.

In 2017, local developers planned a $25 million project to renovate the building that would involve street-level retail, offices, and apartments on the upper floors of the building. However, this project was later abandoned.

In October 2019, the building was purchased by Domo Development, and plans were to redevelop the building into a mixed-use tower that would include a restaurant, retail, office, and residential space. The full renovation would have included a new glass curtain wall. The renovation cost was estimated to be $30 million.

In October 2020, Domo Development raised concerns about the cost of renovating the building and instead planned demolition. A residential mixed-use complex is being proposed as a replacement.

== Closure and demolition ==
After years of disrepair and prohibitive costs to renovate the building, the building was demolished via implosion on the morning of November 21, 2021 at 7:00 AM, by Controlled Demolition, Inc.
