= Fifth Third Center (Evansville) =

Skyscraper located in downtown Evansville, Indiana

Coordinates: 37°58′18″N 87°34′22.5″W

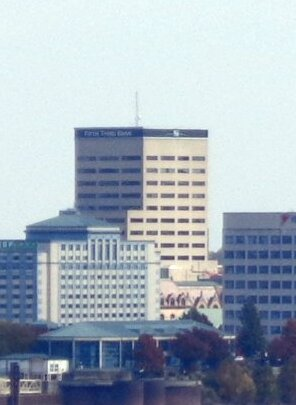
- Interactive map of the Fifth Third Center area

General information
- Status: Completed
- Type: Office
- Location: 16–20 NW 3rd St Evansville, Indiana 47708 United States
- Construction started: 1980
- Completed: 1981

Technical details
- Floor count: 15
- Floor area: 180,500 square feet (16,770 m^{2})

Design and construction
- Architects: Jones & Mah

Other information
- Public transit access: METS

Fifth Third Center is a skyscraper located in downtown Evansville, Indiana, United States. The building has 15 stories and rises to a height of 226 ft (68.9 m) with 180,500 square feet (16,770 m^{2}), and has an attached parking garage for about 450 cars on the south end of the building. It is currently the tallest building in Evansville. Jones & Mah designed the building in 1979 for Citizens National Bank, a Fifth Third Bank predecessor.

== History ==
The United States Department of Housing and Urban Development granted the city a low-cost loan of $2.3 million to assist with financing. Construction on the building began April 24, 1980, with an estimated cost of $15.5 million. The project was part of a larger downtown redevelopment plan from Greg Kempf and Jack Rogers for a multi-million dollar Riverview Commerce Center, which included a Riverview Centre, Coal Exchange Building, and Marriott Hotel. In April 1981, a crane cable lifting a 25-ton, 81-foot long concrete column snapped during construction, causing it to fall on the back-end of a passing car. It missed two of the car's occupants by mere inches, leaving minor injuries.

The building formally opened on December 21, 1981, becoming the fourth headquarters for Citizens National Bank, later named Civitas Bank. Fifth Third Bank purchased Civitas in 1999. In 2018, Riverview Investments LLC purchased the building.

== See also ==
- List of tallest buildings in Evansville
