= Plaza Hotel, College Station =

Former hotel building in College Station, Texas

Coordinates: 30.6281°N 96.3354°W

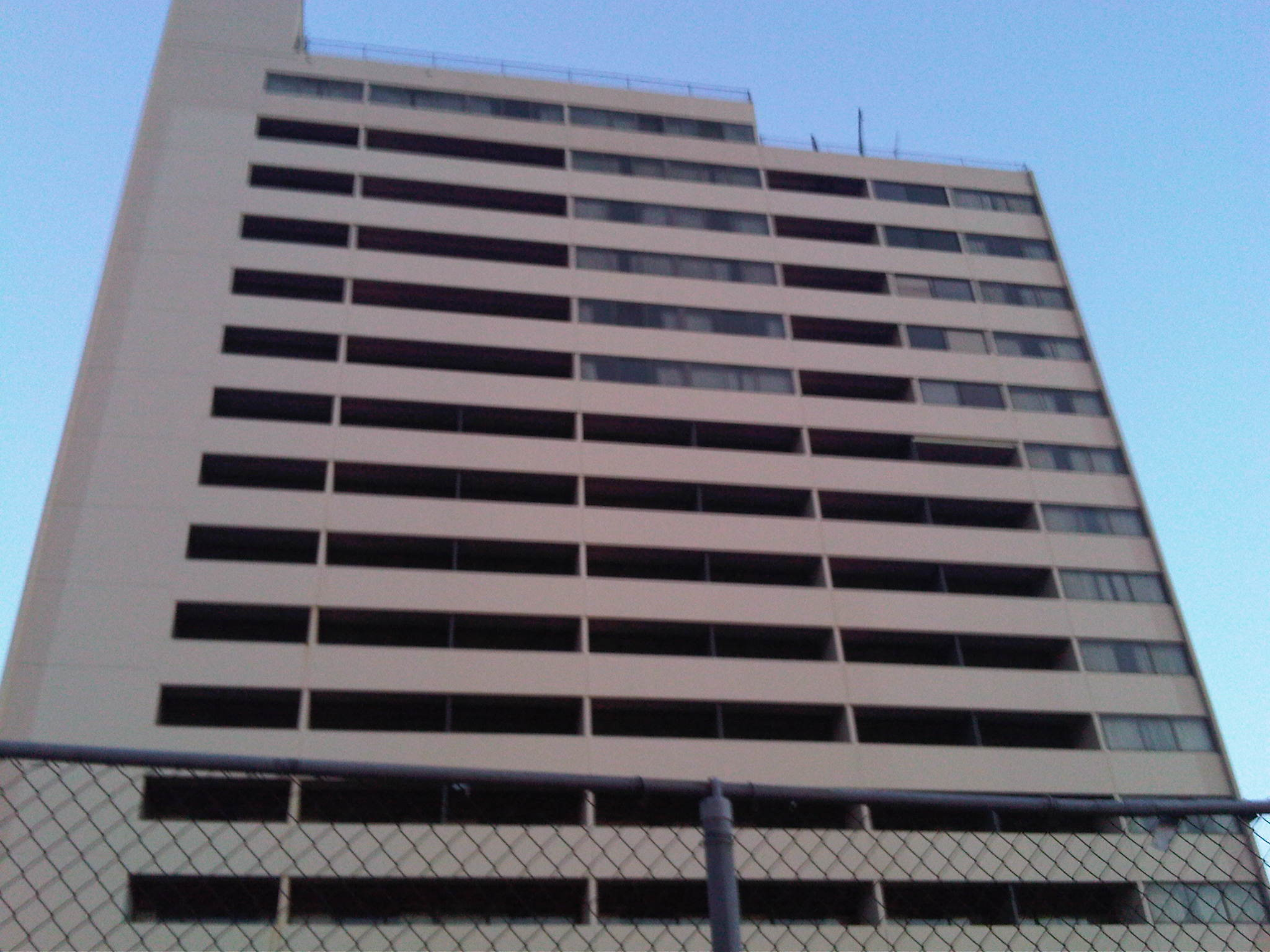
Plaza Hotel in 2011

The Plaza Hotel (formerly University Tower) was a hotel building in College Station, Texas. The building contained 300 rooms and was 17 stories high. It was located at 410 South Texas Avenue, College Station, Texas 77840.

Operated as a Ramada Inn, the initial two-story hotel was opened by Joe Ferreri in 1960 at the suggestion of Texas A&M University's president at the time, James Earl Rudder. High occupancy rates lead Ramada officials to request an expansion, which came in the form of the 17-story tower built in 1980. Ferreri subsequently lost the hotel to bankruptcy in 1987. In the 1990s the property was a private dormitory, The University Towers. The building was acquired and turned into The Plaza Hotel in 2004.

The building contained a swimming pool in the atrium (in which a 12-year-old boy drowned on July 23, 2007), a lounge which overlooked the atrium and pool, a ballroom, a restaurant (Maxwell's, then Remington's), and a penthouse containing a fully equipped kitchen and bar area, dining room, exterior patio, three bedrooms and a master suite with bath and Jacuzzi.

The property is owned by Rossco Holdings, Inc. who filed a voluntary petition for reorganization under Chapter 11 in the U.S. Bankruptcy Court for the Western District of Texas on August 2, 2010. Problems for the hotel began as early as 2008, when Brazos County health inspectors shut down the hotel's kitchen and when guests made complaints about mysterious activities. During the final months of the hotel being open, guests complained of a lack of hot water and air conditioning as well as purported hauntings (including that of Civil War General Jack T. Anderson).

== Demolition ==
The Plaza Hotel was demolished around 6:30 A.M. on Thursday, May 24, 2012. The hotel is being replaced by a $45 million mixed use development that will have apartments, retail, and restaurants, known now as Northpoint Crossing.
