= Memorial Album (Johnny Ace album) =

Compilation album by Johnny Ace
- Released: 1957
- Recorded: 1952–1954
- Genres: R&B, blues
- Length: 32:20
- Label: Duke

Johnny Ace chronology
Memorial Album (1957)	Johnny Ace: Pledging My Love (1986)

Memorial Album is a compilation album by the American musician Johnny Ace, released in 1957 and again in 1961. A shorter version, Memorial Album for Johnny Ace, was released in 1955 and is considered one of the first R&B LP records.

== Background ==
The songs were recorded between 1952 and 1954. Don Robey, the head of Duke Records, was inspired in part to release the album due to the commercial fortunes of Hank Williams's music after the country singer's death. Many of the songs were referred to as "heart ballads" by the music publications of the early 1950s, although Ace often recorded jump blues as B-sides. "My Song", which was inspired by Ruth Brown's "So Long", was Ace's first number one Rhythm & Blues Records single. "I'm Crazy Baby" was the last song cut at Ace's final studio session; he played piano on the track and was backed by the Johnny Board Band. "Pledging My Love", on which Ace was backed by the Johnny Otis Orchestra, was released after Ace's death and also went to number one, in part due to the ambiguous circumstances of Ace's death. "Anymore", on which Ace played vibraphone, was his final hit single.

== Critical reception ==
Professional ratings
Review scores
Source	Rating
All Music Guide to the Blues	5/5 stars
The Encyclopedia of Popular Music	3/5 stars
The Grove Press Guide to the Blues on CD	3.5/5 stars
Los Angeles Times	3.5/4 stars
MusicHound Rock: The Essential Album Guide	4/5 stars
The Rolling Stone Album Guide	4/5 stars

In 1984, The Buffalo News opined that "one is impressed by the singer's engaging ability with both ballads and uptempo blues." In 1988, the Los Angeles Times concluded, "While he still seemed to be searching for his style (the singing here ranges from a gruff blues shading to almost straightforward pop), Ace exhibited a youthful earnestness and desire that perfectly tailored him for the emerging teen rock crowd."

The Grove Press Guide to the Blues on CD noted that Ace "used his slightly unsteady baritone to intone sad blues ballads". The Rolling Stone Album Guide stated that Ace "didn't have great range, and sometimes he wobbled slightly off-key, but [he] did have presence and personality."

== Influence ==
"Pledging My Love" was the most popular R&B song of 1955; it led in sales and in radio and jukebox plays. It is heard on the soundtrack to Martin Scorsese's Mean Streets. In Mystery Train, Greil Marcus referred to it as "the first posthumous rock 'n' roll hit".

Memorial Album remained in print for decades, and was eventually acquired by MCA Records.

The Jamaican musician John Holt covered "The Clock" for the producer Bunny Lee. According to Lee, the Upsetters recorded versions of all of the compilation's tracks. Aretha Franklin performed versions of "Don't You Know" and "Never Let Me Go" during her 1995 concert dates; she had also recorded covers of "My Song" and "The Clock". Bob Dylan issued his cover of "Never Let Me Go" on the Renaldo and Clara EP. Jimmie Vaughan covered "How Can You Be So Mean" on his 2010 album, Plays Blues, Ballads & Favorites. Johnny Knoxville included Memorial Album in a Blender list of his ten favorite albums.

== Track listing ==
Side 1
No.	Title	Writer(s)	Length
1.	"Pledging My Love"	Don Robey; Ferdinand Washington	2:29
2.	"Don't You Know"	Robey; Washington	2:39
3.	"Never Let Me Go"	Joseph Scott	2:53
4.	"So Lonely"	John Marshall Alexander, Jr.	2:31
5.	"I'm Crazy Baby"	Christopher Columbus Pinkston	2:18
6.	"My Song"	David James Mattis	2:59
Total length:			15:49

Side 2
No.	Title	Writer(s)	Length
1.	"Saving My Love for You"	Sherman Johnson	2:40
2.	"The Clock"	Mattis	2:59
3.	"How Can You Be So Mean"	Alexander	2:29
4.	"Still Love You So"	Robey; Washington	2:43
5.	"Cross My Heart"	Alexander; Mattis	2:44
6.	"Anymore"	Robey; Washington	2:56
Total length:			16:31
