= Earl Forest =

American musician

- Also known as: Earl Forrest
- Born: Earl Lacy Forest; December 1, 1926; Memphis, Tennessee, U.S.
- Died: February 26, 2003 (aged 76) Memphis, Tennessee, U.S.
- Occupations: Singer-songwriter, musician
- Instrument: Drums
- Labels: Duke Records; Meteor Records; Flair Records

Earl Forest (December 1, 1926 – February 26, 2003) was an American musician and a member of the Memphis-based R&B coalition called the Beale Streeters, which included Johnny Ace, Bobby Bland, Junior Parker, B.B. King, and Roscoe Gordon. Forest had a hit record in 1953 with "Whoopin' And Hollerin'" on Duke Records. He also recorded for Meteor Records and Flair Records.

== Life and career ==
Forest was born in Memphis, Tennessee on December 1, 1926.

By the late 1940s Forest was part of the network of musicians performing around Beale Street known as the Beale Streeters. These musicians included Johnny Ace, Bobby Bland, Junior Parker, B.B. King, and Roscoe Gordon. They weren't a formal band, but they played at the same venues and backed each other during recording sessions. Scout and program director of WDIA, David James Mattis, would attend local shows and have musicians perform live at the radio station. Forest, pianist John Alexander, and saxophonist Adolph "Billy" Duncan backed B.B King during broadcasts at WDIA. "I guess you can say this was the first little bitty B.B. King band," King recalled in his autobiography.

In 1951, Ike Turner, who was a talent scout and producer for the Bihari brothers at Modern Records, arranged for the Beale Streeters to record for Modern. Forest backed Bobby Bland on his sessions for Modern, which produced the single "Crying All Night Long" / "Dry Up Baby." That session also included musicians Ike Turner on piano, Billy Duncan on tenor saxophone, and Matt Murphy on guitar.

In 1952, WDIA program director David James Mattis founded Duke Records and signed many of the Beale Streeters to the label. Forest played drums during a session for Bobby Bland at WDIA studios in 1952. Soon after, Forest recorded his first record, "Whoopin' And Hollerin'," with Johnny Ace on piano. It reached No. 7 on the Billboard's R&B chart (Most Played in Juke Boxes) in April 1953. To capitalize off the success of the record, the Bihari brothers released a single by Forest on their sublabel Meteor Records, credited as Earl (Whoopin' & Hollerin') Forrest. Later that year, Forest's "Trouble And Me" was issued as a split single with Johnny Ace's "Mid Night Hours Journey" on Flair Records. Forest continued to record, releasing more singles on Duke Records until the 1960s.

As a songwriter, Forest co-wrote the blues standard "Next Time You See Me" which was recorded by Junior Parker, Frankie Lymon, James Cotton and many others. He co-wrote "Morning After" by the Mar-Keys, released on Stax Records in 1961. In the 1980s, Forest recorded with one-time Beale Streeter Bobby Bland, backing him on his 1987 album Blues You Can Use. He also co-wrote two songs on that album, "Spending My Life With You" and "For The Last Time." Forest co-wrote two songs on Little Milton's 1987 album Movin' To The Country, "Just Because You See Me Smilin'" and "Room 244."

Forest died from cancer at the Memphis Veterans Administration Medical Center on February 26, 2003.

== Discography ==
=== Singles ===
- 1953: "Whoopin' And Hollerin'" / "Pretty Bessie" (Duke R-108) – No. 7 on Billboard R&B
- 1953: "I Wronged A Woman" / "I Can't Forgive You" (Meteor 5005)
- 1953: "Last Night's Dream" / "Fifty Three" (Duke 113)
- 1953: "Mid Night Hours Journey" (Johnny Ace) / "Trouble and Me" (Flair 1015)
- 1954: "Out On A Party" / "Oh, Why" (Duke 121)
- 1954: "Your Kind Of Love" / "Ohh, Ohh Wee" (Duke 130)
- 1962: "Memphis Twist" / "Beale Street Popeye" (Duke 349)
- 1963: "The Duck" / "The Crown" (Duke 363)

=== Albums ===
==== Featured appearances ====
- 1978: Big Blues From Duke & Peacock (Blues Anthology Vol. 2) (ABC Records)
- 1987: Earl Forest Featuring The Beale Streeters With Bobby Bland And Johnny Ace (Ace records)
- 1989: The Original Memphis Blues Brothers (Ace Records)
- 1992: The Best Of Duke-Peacock Blues (MCA Records)
- 2005: Blowing The Fuse 1953 – 29 R&B Classics That Rocked The Jukebox in 1953 (Bear Family Records)
- 2008: Rockin' Memphis (Proper Records)
- 2010: Ike Turner – That Kat Sure Could Play! The Singles 1951–1957 (Secret Records Limited)
- 2012: Johnny Ace – Ace's Wild: The Complete Solo Sides And Sessions (Fantastic Voyage)
- 2017: Ike Turner – Sessionography Vol. 1 (Real Gone Records)

==== As a sideman ====
- 1981: B.B. King – The Rarest King (Blues Boy)
- 1987: Junior Parker & Roscoe Gordon – Feelin' Good (Sun Record Company / P-Vine Special)
- 1987: Bobby Bland – Blues You Can Use (Malaco Records)
- 1992: B.B. King – King of the Blues (MCA Records)
- 2001: Bobby Bland – The Anthology (MCA Records)
- 2010: Ike Turner – That Kat Sure Could Play! The Singles 1951–1957 (Secret Records Limited)
- 2013: B.B. King – The Indispensable 1949–1962 (Frémeaux & Associés)
- 2013: Little Junior Parker – Feelin' Good – The 1952–1962 Recordings (Hoodoo Records)
