= Johnny Ace (disambiguation) =

Johnny Ace (1929–1954) was an American rhythm and blues singer.

Johnny Ace is also the name of:

- John Laurinaitis (born 1962), American former professional wrestler known as Johnny Ace and former Senior Vice President of Talent Operations of the WWE

== See also ==
- "The Late Great Johnny Ace", a 1983 song by Paul Simon about the musician
- Johnny Acea (1917–1963), American multi-instrumental session musician
- Johnny Ace Palmer (born 1960), American magician
