= Next Time You See Me =

Song first recorded by Junior Parker in 1956

Single by Little Junior Parker
- B-side: "My Dolly Bee"
- Released: 1957
- Recorded: Houston, Texas, May 7, 1956
- Genre: Blues, R&B
- Length: 2:36
- Label: Duke
- Songwriter(s): Earl Forest, Bill Harvey

Little Junior Parker singles chronology
| "Mother-in-Law Blues" (1956) | "Next Time You See Me" (1957) | "That's All Right" (1958) |

"Next Time You See Me" is a blues song written by Earl Forest and Bill Harvey, originally recorded in 1956 by Junior Parker (as "Little Junior Parker" as he was then known). The song was Parker's first record chart appearance after joining Duke Records and one of his most successful singles in both the R&B and pop charts. "Next Time You See Me" has been performed and recorded by various artists, such as the Grateful Dead.

== Composition and recording ==
"Next Time You See Me" is a mid-tempo twelve-bar blues shuffle with breaks. It features Parker's smooth vocal propelled by a horn-driven rhythm section. As with most of Junior Parker's songs, it is "more melodic than the average blues". Singer and music writer Billy Vera described Parker's approach:

Fronting a horn section was really how Junior heard himself. He was a singer, not a shouter. His voice was sweet, his vibrato throbbing [as on his] first big hit, "Next Time You See Me".

The horn section includes band leader Bill Harvey on tenor sax, Harvey Joe Scott on trumpet, Pluma Davis on trombone, along with Connie McBooker on piano, Pat Hare on guitar, Hamp Simmons on bass, and Sonny Freeman on drums. The song begins with a chorus:

Next time you see me, things won't be the same
Yes, next time you see me, things won't be the same
And if it hurts you, my darlin', you only have yourself to blame

== Releases and charts ==
In 1957, Duke Records released "Next Time You See Me" as a single, backed with "My Dolly Bee". It reached number five on Billboard's R&B chart as well as reaching number 74 on its broader Hot 100. The song is included on several Parker compilations, such as Junior's Blues: The Duke Recordings, Vol. 1 (1992).

== Versions by other artists ==
"Next Time You See Me" was one of the blues and R&B songs that Ron "Pigpen" McKernan brought to the Grateful Dead during their formation. The song, with McKernan on vocals and harmonica, became part of their concert repertoire by 1967. According to group biographer Oliver Trager, they performed two different versions: he describes one as "a driving, uptempo rendition" and the other as "a somewhat rarer and moodier take sung as a duet with [Jerry] Garcia". The group often played the song in the early 1970s and live recordings are included on several albums, such as Hundred Year Hall (recorded April 26, 1972), Europe '72 Volume 2 (recorded April 14, 1972), and Rockin' the Rhein with the Grateful Dead (recorded April 24, 1972).
