= Never Let Me Go (Johnny Ace song) =

Single by Johnny Ace

from the album Memorial
- B-side: "Burley Cutie" (Instrumental)
- Released: 1954
- Recorded: 1953
- Genre: R&B, blues
- Length: 2:55
- Label: Duke
- Songwriter: Joseph Scott
- Producers: Johnny Board, Johnny Otis

Johnny Ace singles chronology
"Please Forgive Me" (1954)	"Never Let Me Go" (1954)	"Pledging My Love" (1955)

Luther Vandross singles chronology
"Heaven Knows" (1993)	"Never Let Me Go'" (1993)	""Endless Love" (Mariah Carey)" (1994)

"Never Let Me Go" is a blues ballad song by American R&B/blues singer Johnny Ace, written by Joseph Scott and released in 1954 under Duke Records. The song is featured on the albums My Songs and Memorial. "Never Let Me Go" was one of his eighth consecutive top ten R&B hits in a row, including "My Song", "Cross My Heart," "Please Forgive Me," "The Clock," "Pledging My Love," "Saving My Love for You," and "Anymore". The song was R&B hit and peaked to No. 9 in October 1954 on the US Billboard Rhythm & Blues Records chart.

== Track listing ==
- US vinyl, 10", 78 RPM single (1954)
1. A1 "Never Let Me Go" - 2:48
2. B1 "Burley Cutie" - 2:35

== Charts ==
Chart (1954)	Peak position
US Rhythm & Blues Records (Billboard)	9

== Luther Vandross version ==
American R&B/soul singer-songwriter Luther Vandross recorded a cover of the song for his 1993 album of the same name; the saxophone solo on this version is performed by Kirk Whalum.

=== Critical reception ===
Larry Flick from Billboard magazine wrote, "LV wraps those golden vocal cords around a more tried and true R&B ballad—the likes of which his legion of fans have come to love. He is aided by an arrangement that is chock full of stately piano lines, as well as a lush sax solo and a slow, swaying rhythm base."

=== Charts ===
Chart (1993)	Peak position
US Hot R&B Singles (Billboard)	31

== Other cover versions ==
- Roy Hamilton released his cover of the song as a single (Epic 9398) in 1960 and included it on his 1961 album You Can Have Her.
- Aretha Franklin recorded a cover of the song on her 1967 album Aretha Arrives.
- Bob Dylan performed the song live as a duet with Joan Baez during The Rolling Thunder Revue in 1975.
- John Martyn recorded a cover of the song for his 1982 album Well Kept Secret. His version features Ronnie Scott on saxophone.
- Katie Webster recorded a cover of the song for her 1990 album Two-Fisted Mama!
