= The Beale Streeters =

American R&B musician coalition

The Beale Streeters were a Memphis-based R&B coalition of musicians, which at times included John Alexander (Johnny Ace), Bobby Bland, Junior Parker, B.B. King, Earl Forest, Willie Nix, and Rosco Gordon. Initially, they were not a formal band, but they played at the same venues and backed each other during recording sessions.

== History ==
By 1949, Beale Street in Memphis, Tennessee, was bustling with merging blues musicians. Collectively they were referred to as the Beale Streeters. They were not an official group, but sometimes one musician was the leader and the rest the sideman.

When B.B. King performed live broadcasts at WDIA, he was backed by John Alexander (piano), Adolph "Billy" Duncan (saxophone), and Earl Forest (drums). "I guess you can say this was the first little bitty B.B. King band," King recalled in his autobiography. By the end of 1949, Bobby "Blue" Bland had joined the group as the vocalist and singer/guitarist/drummer Willie Nix. They performed with the house bands at local nightclubs and competed in amateur night contests at the Palace Theatre.

Members of the Beale Streeters often lodged at Mitchell Hotel, owned by Sunbeam Mitchell.

In 1951, Ike Turner, who was a talent scout and producer for the Bihari brothers at Modern Records, arranged for the Beale Streets to record for Modern at the local YMCA. They appeared on many of King's recordings for RPM Records, a subsidiary of Modern, often Turner substituting for Alexander on piano. King's No. 1 record "3 O’Clock Blues," led to his national tour in 1952 and Ace took over leadership of the band. Soon, Bland also left and Alexander took over vocal duties. By 1952, Alexander began recording as Johnny Ace with David James Mattis of WDIA, who was also the co-founder of Duke Records.

The Beale Streeters occasionally included singer/harpist Junior Parker and vocalist/pianist Rosco Gordon. They appeared on records credited to one of its members, such as Bland's "I.O.U. Blues" (1952). They also appeared on records under The Beale Streeters on Duke.

Members of the Beale Streeters went on to have successful solo careers. Ace's single "My Song" topped the R&B chart (Best Selling Retail) in 1952. Earl Forest's "Whoopin' And Hollerin'" reached No. 7 on the Billboard's R&B chart (Most Played in Juke Boxes) in April 1953. To capitalize off of their success, the Bihari brothers issued a split single from a session in 1951. Ace's "Mid Night Hours Journey" and Forest's "Trouble And Me" was released on the subsidiary Flair Records. Ace had eight hit records in a row following "My Song" before he died in December 1954 from a self-inflicted gunshot wound while playing Russian roulette.

King and Bland later toured together and released joint albums, Together for the First Time... Live (1974) and Bobby Bland and B. B. King Together Again...Live (1976).

== Discography ==
Compilations

- 1987: Earl Forest Featuring The Beale Streeters With Bobby Bland And Johnny Ace (Ace Records)

Singles

- 1952: Johnny Ace with The Beale Streeters – "My Song"/"Follow The Rule" (Duke 102)
- 1952: Bobby Blue" Bland with The Beale Streeters – "Lovin' Blues"/"I. O. U. Blues" (Duke 105)
- 1952: 1953: Rosco Gordon with The Beale Streeters – "Too Many Women"/"Wise To You Baby" (Duke 109)
- 1953: Johnny Ace with The Beale Streeters – "Cross My Heart"/"Angel" (Duke 107)
- 1953: Earl Forest with The Beale Streeters – "Whoopin' And Hollerin'"/"Pretty Bessie " (Duke 108)
