= The Concert in Central Park =

Live album by Simon & Garfunkel
- Released: February 16, 1982
- Recorded: September 19, 1981
- Venues: Great Lawn, Central Park, New York City
- Genre: Folk rock
- Length: 75:51
- Label: Warner Bros.
- Producers: Paul Simon, Art Garfunkel, Roy Halee, Phil Ramone

Simon & Garfunkel chronology
The Simon and Garfunkel Collection: 17 of Their All-Time Greatest Recordings (1981)	The Concert in Central Park (1982)	20 Greatest Hits (1991)

The Concert in Central Park is the first live album by American folk rock duo Simon & Garfunkel, released on February 16, 1982, by Warner Bros. Records. It was recorded on September 19, 1981, at a free benefit concert on the Great Lawn in Central Park, New York City, where the pair performed in front of 500,000 people. A TV special of the event was shown on TV and released on video. Proceeds went toward the redevelopment and maintenance of the park, which had deteriorated due to lack of municipal funding. The concert and album marked the start of a three-year reunion of Paul Simon and Art Garfunkel.

The concept of a benefit concert in Central Park had been proposed by Parks Commissioner Gordon Davis and promoter Ron Delsener. Television channel HBO agreed to carry the concert, and they worked with Delsener to decide on Simon and Garfunkel as the appropriate act for this event. Besides hits from their years as a duo, their 21-song set list included material from their solo careers, and covers. Among them were "The Sound of Silence", "Mrs. Robinson", "The Boxer" and Simon's "Late in the Evening", with the show concluding with a reprise of the latter. Ongoing personal tensions between the duo led them to decide against a permanent reunion, despite the success of the concert and a subsequent world tour.

The album and film were released the year after the concert. Simon and Garfunkel's performance was praised by music critics and the album was commercially successful, peaking No. 6 on the Billboard 200 album charts and being certified double platinum by the Recording Industry Association of America (RIAA). The video recordings were initially broadcast on HBO and were subsequently made available on Laserdisc, CED, VHS and DVD. A single was released of Simon and Garfunkel's live performance of the Everly Brothers song "Wake Up Little Susie". It reached No. 27 on the Billboard Hot 100 in 1982 and is the duo's last Top 40 hit. In Canada the single was No. 4 for 2 weeks on the AC charts.

== Idea and arrangement ==
=== A concert for the park ===
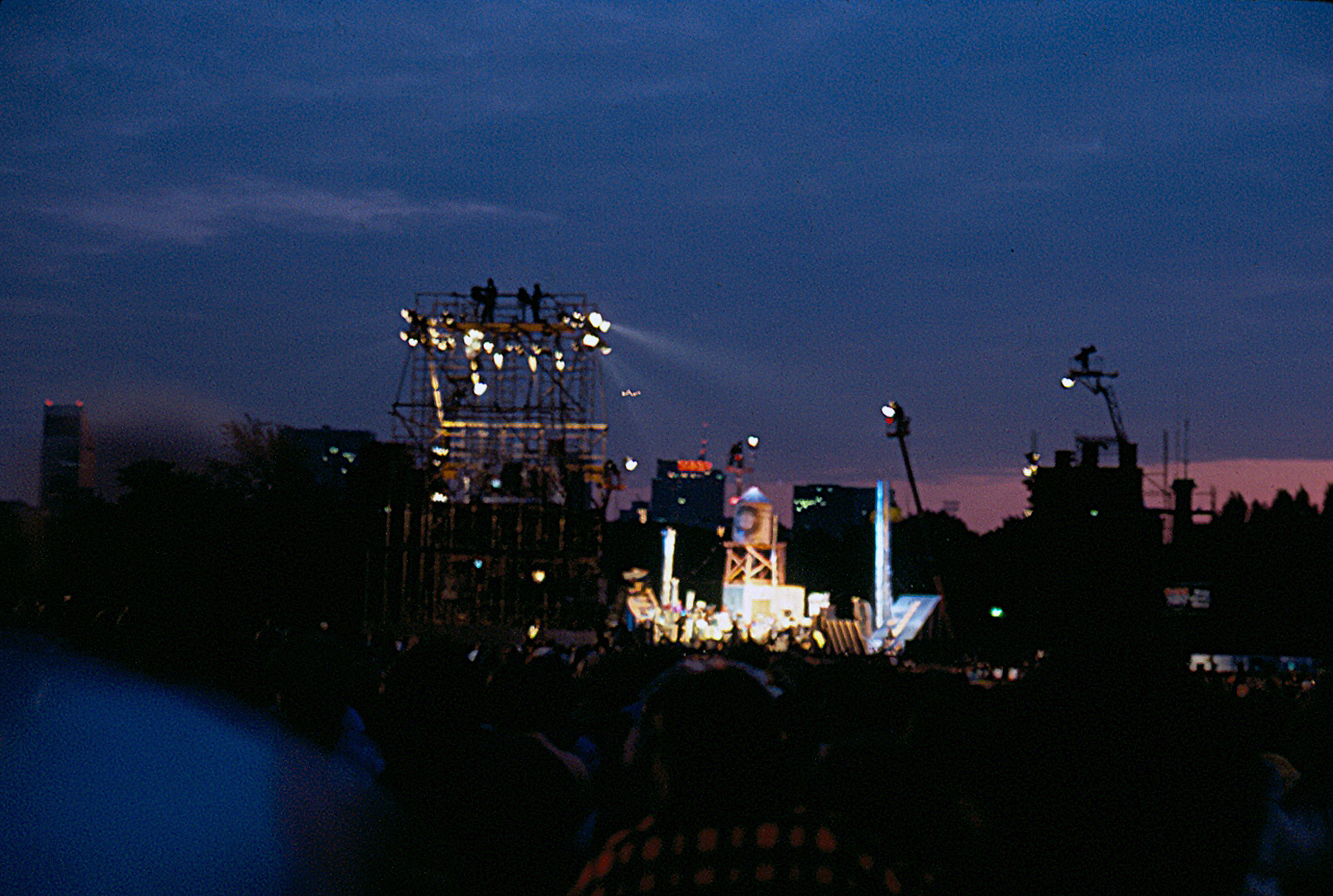
A view of the stage from deep in the audience

New York City's Central Park was in a state of deterioration in the mid-1970s. Though Central Park had been designated a National Historic Landmark in 1962, at the start of the 1980s, the city lacked the financial resources to spend an estimated $3 million to restore or even to maintain the park. The nonprofit Central Park Conservancy was founded in 1980, and began a successful campaign to raise renovation funds.

In the early 1980s, Parks Commissioner Gordon Davis, responsible for New York City's green areas, and Ron Delsener, one of the city's most influential concert promoters, developed the idea of helping Central Park financially with a free open-air concert, under the legal guidance of Bob Donnelly. The city would use profits from merchandising, television, and video rights to renovate the park. Earlier park performances by Elton John and James Taylor showed that this concept could be a success. Davis authorized the project, and Delsener entered discussions with cable TV channel HBO to decide who would perform.

They decided on Simon & Garfunkel, a duo that had formed in New York City in the 1960s and had been one of the most successful folk rock groups through the late 1960s and early 1970s. Simon & Garfunkel had broken up at the height of their popularity and shortly after the release of their fifth studio album, Bridge over Troubled Water, which is deemed to be their artistic peak and which topped the 1970 Billboard charts for ten weeks; they had grown apart artistically and did not get along well with each other. In the following ten years, both continued musical careers as solo artists and worked together only sporadically on one-off projects. Garfunkel made brief guest appearances at Simon's concerts, which were always successful.

Delsener presented the plan to Paul Simon in the summer of 1981. Simon was enthusiastic about the idea, but questioned whether it could be financially successful, especially given the poor audience attendance of his last project, the autobiographical movie One-Trick Pony. Simon's confidence had declined and he had sought treatment for depression. He questioned whether he and Art Garfunkel could work together, but contacted Garfunkel, who was vacationing in Switzerland. Garfunkel was excited about the idea and immediately returned to the US.

From the promoter's viewpoint, Simon and Garfunkel were ideal choices. Not only were they likely to draw a large crowd to the concert, they also had roots in the city – both had grown up and gone to school in Forest Hills, Queens. Music critic Stephen Holden pointed out that, unlike artists who had left in pursuit of lifestyles offered by other locales, the two had always been a part of New York City. Both gained inspiration from the cityscape and the cultural variety of New York, and they spoke of these influences in their songs.

=== Planning and rehearsals ===
Planning and rehearsals for the concert took about three weeks in a Manhattan theater. The rehearsals were characterized by past tensions that resurfaced between the performers under the intense time pressure. Paul Simon later said: "Well, the rehearsals were just miserable. Artie and I fought all the time." An early concept was for each singer to give a solo performance, with Simon allotted the greater amount of time, and to conclude with the duo performing their joint works. This idea was rejected because, according to Garfunkel, "It didn't seem right to either of us that Paul should be the opening act for Simon & Garfunkel, and for him to follow Simon & Garfunkel didn't make show-business sense".

The two decided to perform most of the show together, with room for each to showcase some solo material. Simon, who had resumed songwriting after a hiatus, interrupted a series of studio recording sessions for the concert preparations. He used the live show as an opportunity to test one of his new songs in front of an audience. Garfunkel also contributed a new song, "A Heart in New York", from his soon-to-be released album Scissors Cut.

A Michael Doret designer poster for the concert

The two differed on the presentation of the concert. Garfunkel wanted to recreate the duo's mid-1960s live performances, using only their voices backed by Simon's acoustic guitar. Simon felt that this was impossible, as an injury had rendered him incapable of playing guitar for the full length of a concert, and his newer material was typically arranged for larger ensembles that often included horns and amplified instruments such as electric piano and electric guitar. Garfunkel initially agreed to hire a second guitarist, but later rejected the idea. A group of eleven musicians was assembled for the concert, most of whom were experienced studio musicians and had played on albums involving Simon or Garfunkel and these included Billy Joel's guitarist David Brown, Muscle Shoals guitarist Pete Carr, Anthony Jackson (bass guitar), Rob Mounsey (synthesizer), John Eckert and John Gatchell (trumpets), Dave Tofani and Gerry Niewood (saxophones), Steve Gadd and Grady Tate (drums, percussion), and Richard Tee (piano).

The musical arrangements for the concert were written by Paul Simon and David Matthews. Some songs differed significantly from their original versions; for example, "Me and Julio Down by the Schoolyard" featured more prominent Latin elements and included a salsa break, while the folk rock "Kodachrome" was set as a harder rock song and played together with the Chuck Berry single "Maybellene" as a medley.

Garfunkel had difficulties in the rehearsals. Both men easily recalled their songs from the 1960s, but Garfunkel had to learn the harmonies and arrangements for Simon's solo songs, as modified for the reunion concert. He was also uncomfortable that Simon had rewritten some of the lyrics for their old songs. Despite the need to adapt to Simon and his style, Garfunkel enjoyed some of the songs, and was glad to perform Simon's "American Tune".

News reports and the Michael Doret-designed posters of the Central Park show named the musicians individually and did not bill them as "Simon & Garfunkel"; that the two singers would perform together on stage in a reunion was not officially announced until only a week before the concert when it was published in New York newspapers. The two stated in interviews that further collaboration was not planned.

== Concert ==
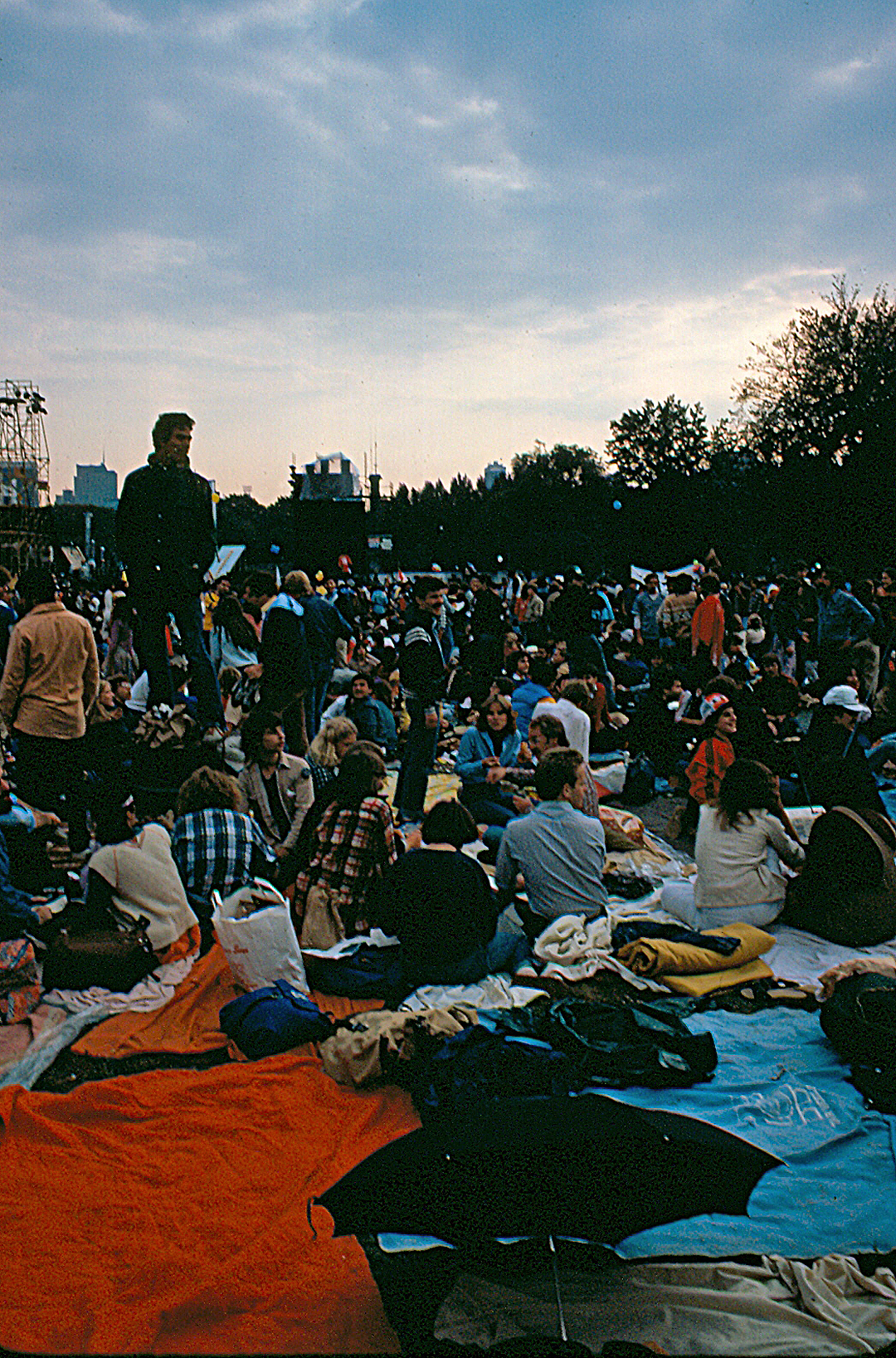
The audience waits on Central Park's Great Lawn for the concert's beginning.

The concert took place on Saturday, September 19, 1981, on the Great Lawn, the central open space of Central Park. The first spectators, many carrying chairs or picnic blankets, arrived at daybreak to secure a good spot. The Parks Department originally expected about 300,000 attendees. Although rain fell throughout the day and continued until the start of the concert, an estimated 500,000 audience members made this the seventh-largest concert attendance in United States history.

The stage backdrop depicted an urban rooftop with water tank and air outlet, symbolic of New York's skyline. At twilight, the backing band went onstage, followed by New York's mayor, Ed Koch, who announced, "Ladies and gentlemen, Simon and Garfunkel!" The duo entered through a side stage door, took center stage amid audience applause, shook hands, and began the concert with their 1968 hit "Mrs. Robinson".

After the second song, "Homeward Bound", Simon delivered a short speech which began, "Well, it's great to do a neighborhood concert." He then thanked the police, the fire department, the park administration and finally Ed Koch. Some of the audience booed at the mention of Koch but applauded as Simon continued by tongue-in-cheek thanking "the guys who are selling loose joints [for] giving the city half of their income tonight."

Simon & Garfunkel played twenty-one songs in total: ten originally recorded by the duo, eight from Simon's solo career, one recorded by Garfunkel, a cover of The Everly Brothers' "Wake Up Little Susie", and the medley version of "Maybellene". Each performer sang three songs alone, including one new song apiece. Garfunkel sang the Simon & Garfunkel songs "Bridge over Troubled Water" and "April Come She Will", as well as "A Heart in New York", a song written by Gallagher and Lyle that appeared on his album Scissors Cut, which had been released the previous month. Simon's solo performances were the title song of his 1975 album Still Crazy After All These Years, the number-one single "50 Ways to Leave Your Lover", and the unreleased "The Late Great Johnny Ace", which would appear on his 1983 album Hearts and Bones.

"The Late Great Johnny Ace" was interrupted when an audience member ran to the stage and shouted at Simon: "I need to talk to you!" The man was carried away by security, and Simon finished the song. The incident provoked associations to the song's lyrics, in which Simon speaks of the deaths of Johnny Ace, John F. Kennedy, and John Lennon. Lennon's murder by an obsessed fan had taken place only nine months previously, not far from the concert site. Despite this association, Simon said that he was not afraid of any on-stage incidents. In May 1982 as a guest on Late Night with David Letterman, he explained that while it is not unusual for fans to jump onto the stage with flowers, this action was new to him, but also felt that the man simply appeared intoxicated. His greater concern was that the song's premiere was ruined.

Lyrics referring to the New York area produced audience applause, such as Garfunkel's ode to his home city, "A Heart in New York", which describes from a New Yorker's point of view the first glimpse of the city when returning there by air:

New York, lookin' down on Central Park, where they say you should not wander after dark

Applause broke out during "The Sound of Silence", when the narrative voice refers to a large crowd of people in the dark:

And in the naked light I saw ten thousand people maybe more

After the 17th song, "The Boxer", which contained an additional stanza not included in the album version, Simon & Garfunkel thanked the audience and left the stage, but returned to deliver an encore of three songs: "Old Friends / Bookends Theme", "The 59th Street Bridge Song (Feelin' Groovy)", and "The Sound of Silence". Before the latter, Simon said that they wanted to have fireworks but were not allowed to, adding, "Let's make our own fireworks here." Many spectators sparked lighters. After introducing the members of the backing band, they gave a final encore – a reprise of "Late in the Evening".

=== Set list ===
All songs composed by Paul Simon unless otherwise noted.

1. "Mrs. Robinson"
2. "Homeward Bound"
3. "America"
4. "Me and Julio Down by the Schoolyard"
5. "Scarborough Fair" (Traditional, arr. by Paul Simon and Art Garfunkel)
6. "April Come She Will"
7. "Wake Up Little Susie" (Felice and Boudleaux Bryant)
8. "Still Crazy After All These Years"
9. "American Tune"
10. "Late in the Evening"
11. "Slip Slidin' Away"
12. "A Heart in New York" (Benny Gallagher, Graham Lyle)
13. "The Late Great Johnny Ace"
14. "Kodachrome/Maybellene" (Simon/Chuck Berry)
15. "Bridge over Troubled Water"
16. "50 Ways to Leave Your Lover"
17. "The Boxer"

Encore

1. "Old Friends / Bookends Theme"
2. "The 59th Street Bridge Song (Feelin' Groovy)"
3. "The Sound of Silence"

Encore

1. "Late in the Evening" (Reprise)

=== Personnel ===
- Paul Simon – vocals, guitar
- Art Garfunkel – vocals
- Pete Carr, David Brown – guitar
- Anthony Jackson – bass guitar
- Richard Tee – keyboards (musical director)
- Steve Gadd, Grady Tate – drums
- Rob Mounsey – synthesizer
- John Gatchell, John Eckert – trumpet
- Dave Tofani, Gerry Niewood – saxophone

== Album release ==
A recording of the concert was released five months later, on February 16, 1982. The audio tracks were processed in postproduction, but Rolling Stone magazine wrote that they were not completely polished, and preserved the roar and the fuzziness of live rock music heard through a loudspeaker. Two songs were not included on the album: the interrupted "Late Great Johnny Ace", and the encore reprise of "Late in the Evening". The album was an international success. It peaked at number six on the Billboard 200 chart, and was certified 2× Multi-Platinum with sales of over 2 million copies in US.

The album sold more than 1,270,000 copies in France, where it was certified Diamond. It was also successful in seven other countries, including New Zealand. The album was released as a double LP and as a single compact cassette. In 1988 it was issued as a single CD; various reissues in different formats have occurred, including a combined CD/DVD release. The Concert was recorded by Roy Halee on the Record Plant NY Black Truck with David Hewitt Director, assisted by Phil Gitomer, Steve Barash and John Mathias.

=== Track listing ===
The song "The Late Great Johnny Ace" and the reprise of "Late in the Evening" were not included in the original release of the album but are on the DVD.

Side one
No.	Title	Length
1.	"Mrs. Robinson"	3:52
2.	"Homeward Bound"	4:22
3.	"America"	4:47
4.	"Me and Julio Down by the Schoolyard"	3:22
5.	"Scarborough Fair"	3:52

Side two
No.	Title	Length
1.	"April Come She Will"	2:37
2.	"Wake Up Little Susie"	2:19
3.	"Still Crazy After All These Years"	4:04
4.	"American Tune"	4:33
5.	"Late in the Evening"	4:09

Side three
No.	Title	Length
1.	"Slip Slidin' Away"	4:54
2.	"A Heart in New York"	2:49
3.	"Kodachrome/Maybellene"	5:51
4.	"Bridge over Troubled Water"	4:48

Side four
No.	Title	Length
1.	"Fifty Ways to Leave Your Lover"	4:23
2.	"The Boxer"	6:02
3.	"Old Friends"	2:57
4.	"The 59th Street Bridge Song (Feelin' Groovy)"	2:01
5.	"The Sound of Silence"	4:13

== Video release ==
The concert was filmed for television broadcast and the home video market. It was produced by James Signorelli, and directed by Michael Lindsay-Hogg, a specialist in music documentaries who had directed the Beatles' film Let It Be, and executive produced by Lorne Michaels, who had recently departed the NBC-TV comedy/variety series Saturday Night Live. Video production was coordinated by Billy Steinberg. Simon himself financed the US$750,000 cost of the staging and the video recording. It is unknown how much HBO paid for the television and video rights of the recording – $1 million according to some sources, over $3 million according to others. The film includes the two songs that had not appeared on the album, and at 87 minutes, runs 12 minutes longer.

HBO televised the film, Simon and Garfunkel: The Concert in Central Park, on February 21, 1982, five days after the album was released. The film was later released for sale in VHS, CED Videodisc, LaserDisc, and DVD formats. It sold more than 50,000 copies in the US, where it earned Gold certification for a music longform video. It was broadcast on PBS on August 22, 1988, and again on August 8, 2015.

== Critical reception ==
Professional ratings
Review scores
Source	Rating
AllMusic	4.5/5 stars
Encyclopedia of Popular Music	3/5 stars
Rolling Stone	4/5 stars
The Village Voice	C+

The concert and recordings were positively received by music critics. Stephen Holden praised the performance in The New York Times the day after the concert; he subsequently praised the live album in Rolling Stone magazine. He wrote that Simon and Garfunkel were successful in reviving their sound, that the backing band was "one of the finest groups of musicians ever to play together at a New York rock concert", and the rearrangements of Simon's solo material were improvements over the originals. Despite the risks in performing so many acoustic ballads in an open-air concert on a cool night, the songs "were beautifully articulated, in near-perfect harmony".

An October 1981 review in Rolling Stone called the concert "one of the finest performances of [1981]", one that "vividly recaptured another time, an era when well-crafted, melodic pop bore meanings that stretched beyond the musical sphere and into the realms of culture and politics." This reviewer noted that Garfunkel's voice was noticeably restrained in high passages, though still harmonious, and that the evening's only weak spot was the "Kodachrome"/"Maybellene" medley, because neither singer could raise the right level of emotion for the rock songs.

A Billboard reviewer wrote in March 1982, "This 19 song, two record set gloriously recaptures the past with sterling renditions of most of the duo's classics as well as a few of Simon's solo compositions filled out by Garfunkel's harmony." However, Robert Christgau of The Village Voice dismissed the album as "a corporate boondoggle—a classy way for Warner Bros. artist Simon to rerecord, rerelease, and resell the catalogue CBS is sitting on." He felt Simon had been better off without Garfunkel since 1971 and, regarding the duo's interpretations of solo material and the band-format's reinterpretation of old material, "live doubles are live doubles, nostalgia is nostalgia, wimps are wimps, and who needs any of 'em?"

== Aftermath ==
The duo was disappointed with their performance, particularly Garfunkel, who felt that he sang poorly. Simon said that he did not immediately realize the magnitude of the event: "I didn't get what had happened – how big it was – until I went home, turned on the television and saw it on all the news ... and later that night on the front pages of all the newspapers. Then I got it."

In May 1982, Simon & Garfunkel went on a world tour with legs in Japan, Europe, Oceania, and North America. The European leg of their tour began on May 28, 1982, at the Stadion am Bieberer Berg in Offenbach am Main. This was their first performance in Germany, and had an attendance of around 40,000 spectators.

When they were not on the road, the duo went into the studio to work on what was to be a reunion Simon & Garfunkel album, tentatively entitled Think Too Much, with Garfunkel adding harmony vocals to new songs for which Simon had already laid down some backing tracks. They set a release date of spring 1983 to coincide with their planned North American tour, but after increasingly acrimonious delays and disagreements, Simon told Warner Brothers he could no longer work with Garfunkel and that the project as a collaborative album was canceled. Garfunkel dropped out of the project, which then became Simon's November 1983 solo album Hearts and Bones.

Several years would pass before Simon & Garfunkel worked together again. Their next joint public appearance was in 1990, when they performed for their induction into the Rock and Roll Hall of Fame. When Simon gave another free concert in Central Park on August 15, 1991, he rejected Garfunkel's offer to participate. However, they agreed to perform together in 1993 for 21 sold-out concerts in New York, with half of the show being Paul Simon solo with a band and the other half Simon & Garfunkel, opening the door to future reunion tours.

Simon & Garfunkel's Concert in Central Park raised around $51,000 for Central Park. Benefit concerts by other musicians followed, and helped to raise awareness of the park's state. With donations from the general public and with the help of wealthy benefactors, the park was restored during the 1980s and gained recognition as a major tourist attraction. As of 2011, donations still make up the majority of the park's budget. Today concerts and other benefits are regularly held on the Great Lawn.

== Chart performance ==
=== Weekly charts ===
Chart (1982–83)	Position
Australian Kent Music Report Albums Chart	5
Austrian Albums Chart	5
Canadian RPM Albums Chart	9
Dutch Mega Albums Chart	1
French SNEP Albums Chart	1
Italian Albums Chart	5
Japanese Oricon LP Chart	2
New Zealand Albums Chart	1
Norwegian VG-lista Albums Chart	1
Spanish Albums Chart	7
Swedish Albums Chart	5
UK Albums Chart	6
United States Billboard Pop Albums	6
West German Media Control Albums Chart	3
Chart (1988)	Position
Dutch Mega Albums Chart	9
Chart (1995)	Position
French SNEP Albums Chart	25
Chart (1999)	Position
Norwegian VG-lista Albums Chart	10
Chart (2025)	Position
Greek Albums (IFPI)	34

=== Year-end charts ===
Chart (1982)	Position
Australian Albums Chart	10
Austrian Albums Chart	5
Canadian Albums Chart	67
German Albums (Offizielle Top 100)	8
Italian Albums Chart	8
Japanese LP Chart	15
US Billboard 200	75
Chart (1983)	Position
New Zealand Albums (RMNZ)	30

== Certifications and sales ==
Region	Certification	Certified units/sales
Australia (ARIA) video	10× Platinum	150,000^{^}
Australia (ARIA)	Platinum	50,000^{^}
Austria (IFPI Austria)	Platinum	50,000^{*}
Canada (Music Canada)	Gold	50,000^{^}
France (SNEP) video	Platinum	20,000^{*}
France (SNEP)	Diamond	1,000,000^{*}
Germany (BVMI) video	Platinum	50,000^{^}
Germany (BVMI)	Gold	250,000^{^}
Hong Kong (IFPI Hong Kong)	Gold	10,000^{*}
Italy (FIMI) sales since 2009	Platinum	50,000^{‡}
Japan (Oricon Charts)	—	394,000
Netherlands (NVPI)	Gold	50,000^{^}
New Zealand (RMNZ) video	4× Platinum	20,000^{^}
New Zealand (RMNZ)	Platinum	15,000^{^}
Portugal (AFP) video	4× Platinum	32,000^{^}
Portugal (AFP)	Platinum	60,000
Switzerland (IFPI Switzerland)	2× Platinum	100,000^{^}
United Kingdom (BPI) video	Platinum	50,000^{*}
United Kingdom (BPI)	Gold	100,000^{^}
United States (RIAA) video	Gold	50,000^{^}
United States (RIAA)	2× Platinum	2,000,000^{^}
Yugoslavia	—	44,464
Summaries
Europe	—	2,500,000
^{*} Sales figures based on certification alone.^{^} Shipments figures based on certification alone.^{‡} Sales+streaming figures based on certification alone.
