= Pledging My Love =

Single by Johnny Ace
- B-side: "No Money"
- Released: December 1954
- Genre: Rhythm and blues
- Length: 2:35
- Label: Duke
- Songwriters: Ferdinand Washington, Don Robey
- Producer: Johnny Otis

Johnny Ace singles chronology
"Never Let Me Go" (1954)	"Pledging My Love" (1954)	"Anymore" (1955)

"Pledging My Love" is a blues ballad. It was written by Ferdinand Washington and Don Robey and published in 1954.

== Background ==
The song's theme is captured in the title and the opening lines:

Forever my darling, my love will be true,
Always and forever, I'll love only you,

== Johnny Ace recording ==
The most popular recording of the song was done by Johnny Ace. It was released by Duke Records as catalog number 136 in December 1954, soon after Ace's death by an accidental self-inflicted gunshot wound. Ace's version peaked on the Billboard chart at number 17 and spent 10 weeks at number 1 on the R&B chart. The recording was produced by Johnny Otis, who also played the vibraphone on the track and featured the Johnny Otis band, who were credited as Johnny Board's Orchestra on the record label.

In December 1958, it was reissued with additional background vocals, using the same label number. This issue was backed by his "Anymore", modified similarly.

== Other versions ==
- It was covered by Teresa Brewer (Coral Records, catalog number 61362) and The Four Lads (Columbia Records, catalog number 40436). Brewer's version also charted at number 17 on the pop chart in 1955. On Cash Box magazine's Best-Selling Record charts, where all versions are combined, the song peaked at number 11.
- Bing Crosby recorded the song in 1955 for use on his radio show and it was subsequently issued on the CD So Rare: Treasures from the Crosby Archive, Vol. One (2010).
- Johnny Tillotson recorded the song as his B-side single in 1960. His version peaked at number 63 on US charts.

== Later cover versions ==
- Roy Hamilton (released by Epic Records as catalog number 9294, number 45 on Billboard and number 51 on Cash Box in 1958)
- Johnny Tillotson (released by Cadence Records as catalog number 1377, went to number 63 on Billboard's Hot 100, and number 73 on Cash Box in 1960).
- Vince Taylor And His Playboys covered it as the A-side of their second single in 1959 (B-side was "Brand New Cadillac").
- Bobby Vee on his 1961 album Bobby Vee with Strings and Things.
- Joe Hinton covered it as a B-side in 1965.
- Percy Sledge put out a single of Pledging My Love in 1967 in Germany and the UK.
- Jay and the Americans released a cover version of the song on their 1969 album, Sands of Time.
- Nora Aunor and Manny de Leon recorded the song as the title number for their 1970 LP Pledging My Love
- LaVern Baker included in her 1970 Let Me Belong to You album.
- In 1971, Kitty Wells released a single of "Pledging My Love" and used it as the title song of an album. Her version topped out at number 49 on the US country charts, but reached number 19 in Canada.
- In 1972, by Jerry Lee Lewis on the double LP Live in London
- In 1973, a cover version by Diana Ross and Marvin Gaye appeared on the album Diana & Marvin. It reached number 18 in South Africa.
- Tom Jones covered the song in 1975. It charted only in Canada, where it reached number 93 on the Pop chart and number 24 Adult Contemporary.
- In 1975, Billy Thunderkloud & the Chieftones released a single of "Pledging My Love" that reached number 37 on the Billboard country charts.
- In 1976, Delbert McClinton includes a cover version on his album Genuine Cowhide. Roy Orbison covers it too in I'm Still in Love with You album.
- The song was recorded by Elvis Presley late in his career and appears on his 1977 album Moody Blue, the last album released before Presley's death in 1977. He recorded the song in October of '76 in the jungle room at Graceland, In Canada the song was co-charted with the a-side "Way Down" and they reached No. 1 in the country charts. Presley first sang the song shortly after its release on June 15, 1955, it would be the only time he performed it live.
- In 1981 David Allan Coe released this song on his album Tennessee Whiskey.
- In 1983, Emmylou Harris released this song on her album White Shoes, it reached number 9 on the US country charts and also number 9 in Canada.
- In 1986, Aaron Neville released a version of this song on his Orchids In The Storm EP.
- In 1993, Solomon Burke released a version of this song on his album Soul Of the Blues.
- In 1994, blues singer Little Milton covered this song on his album I'm A Gambler.
- In 2008, the band Flat Duo Jets released their previously recorded live album, Two Headed Cow, which features the song "Golden Strings"; it's clearly inspired by "Pledging My Love", containing the lyrics: "I'll forever love you, For the rest of my days, I'll never part from you, Or your loving ways".
- In 2012, Ash included a version on their Little Infinity EP.

== In popular culture ==
- Ace's "Pledging My Love" was used twice in the 1983 film Christine directed by John Carpenter and based on the novel by Stephen King about a 17-year-old high schooler who falls in love with his first car, a sentient 1958 Plymouth Fury.
- It is briefly heard in Back to the Future (1985) when Lorraine Baines is in the car with her future son Marty McFly.
- The song is also played during two movies starring Harvey Keitel, Bad Lieutenant (1992) and Mean Streets (1973).
- Paul Simon wrote a song called "The Late Great Johnny Ace" and released it on his Hearts and Bones album. In the early 2000s, Simon sang "Pledging my Love" live in concert, telling the audience that this record was the first one he ever bought.
- In Chapter 18 of Stephenie Meyer's Midnight Sun, Edward and Bella listen to the song on a "semi-audible" radio station while driving in Bella's truck.
