= Meteor Records =

- "I Held My Baby Last Night" single by Elmore James, released in 1952
- Parent company: Modern Records
- Founded: November 1952
- Founder: Lester Bihari
- Defunct: 1957
- Status: Defunct
- Location: Memphis, Tennessee

Meteor Records was a Memphis-based R&B record label run by Lester Bihari, one of the Bihari brothers, owners of Modern Records in Los Angeles. Founded in 1952, the label was a bold experiment to broaden the talent base by focusing on signing and recording Southern regional talent by having recording studios locally available.

The label's first release, "I Believe" / "I Held My Baby Last Night," by Elmore James in 1952 was their biggest success. By 1956 it was clear that the growing teenage rock 'n roll market was not buying Southern based blues. In 1957, Meteor Records issued its last recording and the Bihari brothers consolidated their labels in Los Angeles. Although the label did not succeed economically, it was an innovative effort on the part of the Bihari brothers to broaden the musical base.

The current incarnation of Meteor Records began in 1986 in Baltimore, Maryland. The label's first release was Cubic Feet's, Across the River, which came out originally as a 12" vinyl EP in 1988. Pete Solley was house producer for the label for many years and produced the first Nuke the Soup album.

Meteor Records released Nuke the Soup's third album in early 2025 featuring production by Kevin Killen and Gerry Leonard.

== Roster ==
Elmore James was the first artist signed to the label and recorded the first release followed by Bep Brown's "Round House Boogie" / "Kickin' The Blues Around." Essentially the label picked up artists who didn't have success at Sun Records, including James, Rufus Thomas, Junior Thompson, Charlie Feathers, and Malcolm Yelvington. Bihari licensed some sides of jazz musician Al Smith from Chance Records in 1953.

List of artists who recorded for Meteor included:

- Elmore James
- Bep Brown
- Chicago Sunny Boy
- Rufus Thomas
- Charlie Feathers
- Malcolm Yelvington
- Earl Forest
- Smokey Hogg
- Sunny Blair
- Little Milton
- Jimmy Haggett
- The Velvatones
- Minnie Thomas
- The Del-Rios
- Junior Thompson
- Cubic Feet (current artists)
- Nuke the Soup (current artists)

== See also ==
- List of record labels
