= Frankie Ervin =

- Also known as: Frank Evans; Frankie Day
- Born: Frank Miller Ervin; March 27, 1926; Blythe, California, United States
- Died: February 1, 2009 (aged 82) San Francisco, California, United States
- Occupation: Singer
- Instrument: Vocals
- Years active: Early 1940s–early 1960s, 1982–2000s

Frank Miller "Frankie" Ervin (March 27, 1926 – February 1, 2009) was an American R&B singer who recorded both solo and with vocal groups including Johnny Moore's Three Blazers ("Dragnet Blues", 1953) and The Shields ("You Cheated", 1958).

== Life and career ==
Ervin was born in Blythe, California. After his father left, his mother, Lula Deveroux (or Debroux), moved with her children to Woodville and then Madill, Oklahoma, and encouraged the children (four boys and four girls) to take part in talent shows. They later moved to Ardmore, Oklahoma, where Frankie learned tap dancing, and sang in church. In 1942 he joined his older brothers Jesse and Warren, who were working as a dance act, Skid and Slid, in Fort Worth, Texas. The family moved in 1944 to Los Angeles, where Frankie and Jesse Ervin worked in menial jobs and began performing in clubs on Central Avenue.

In 1951, Frankie Ervin was signed as a singer by Mercury Records, and released the single "High School Baby" / "Got My Shipyard Job Back Again," with Maxwell Davis' band and Jesse Ervin on guitar. The following year, he recorded as featured vocalist with Oscar Moore's Combo, and in 1953 (credited as Frank Evans) recorded with Preston Love's band for Federal Records. Later in the year he recorded "Dragnet Blues" as lead singer with Johnny Moore's Three Blazers, on the Bihari brothers' Modern label. The record company faced legal action from Jack Webb of the Dragnet radio and TV show, for unauthorized use of part of the show's theme, but the case was resolved and the record sold well, reaching number 8 on the Billboard R&B chart.

The Bihari brothers persuaded Ervin to leave Johnny Moore's group and record solo, again with Maxwell Davis' orchestra, but his records were not successful and he returned to touring with the Three Blazers. In early 1955, he recorded "Johnny Ace's Last Letter" with the group. The song purported to be a letter from singer Johnny Ace explaining why he had killed himself; it reached number 15 on the R&B chart. Later in the year, Ervin recorded several Christmas songs with the Blazers, including "Christmas Eve Baby". He also recorded under the name Frankie Day for the Caddy label set up by radio DJ Dick Hugg.

In early 1958, record producer George Motola persuaded Ervin to record the song "You Cheated", which had been first recorded by a white vocal group, The Slades. Ervin was backed by an impromptu studio vocal group comprising Jesse Belvin, Johnny "Guitar" Watson, Tommy "Buster" Williams and "Handsome" Mel Williams, and musicians including guitarist René Hall. Credited to The Shields - an otherwise non-existent group - and first issued on the Tender label before being reissued by Dot Records, the record reached number 12 on the pop chart later that year, and number 11 on the R&B chart. Ervin toured and appeared on national TV to promote the record, with different singers as his backing vocalists, but the original recording group reconvened in the studio to record less successful follow-ups, including "Nature Boy".

Ervin continued to record occasionally under his own name for small labels in the late 1950s and early 1960s, but with little success. He left the music business in the 1960s, before re-emerging in 1982 with San Francisco band Mitch Woods and his Rocket 88. Following the release of a compilation album of his 1950s material, Dragnet Blues, in 1987, he returned to the recording studio in 1988, to record in Los Angeles with Ernie Freeman's and Charles Brown's bands. He continued to perform from then on, mainly in the San Francisco area. A compilation of his recordings from the 1950s to the 1990s, You Cheated, You Lied, was released on his own label, Punchline, in 1996.

He died in San Francisco in 2009, aged 82.
