= Roy Hamilton =

American singer (1929–1969)

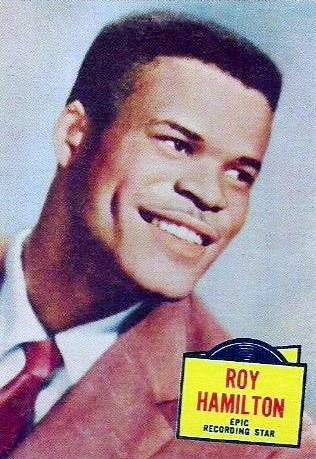
- Hamilton in 1957

Background information
- Born: Rodothas Hamilton; April 16, 1929; Leesburg, Georgia, U.S.
- Died: July 20, 1969 (aged 40) New Rochelle, New York, U.S.
- Genres: Traditional pop, show tunes, swing, vocal jazz, R&B, soul
- Occupation: Singer
- Instrument: Vocals
- Years active: 1947–1969
- Labels: Epic, MGM, RCA
- Website: royhamilton.net

Roy Hamilton (April 16, 1929 – July 20, 1969) was an American singer. By combining semi-classical technique with traditional black gospel feeling, he brought soul to Great American Songbook singing.

Hamilton's greatest commercial success came from 1954 through 1961, when he was Epic Records' most prolific artist. His two most influential recordings, "You'll Never Walk Alone" and "Unchained Melody", became Epic's first two number-one hits when they topped the Billboard R&B chart in March 1954 and May 1955, respectively. Hamilton became the first solo artist in the label's history to have a US top-ten pop hit when "Unchained Melody" peaked at No. 6 in May 1955.

== Early life ==
Roy Hamilton was born in Leesburg, Georgia, to Evelyn and Albert Hamilton, where he began singing in church choirs at the age of six. In the summer of 1943, when Hamilton was fourteen, the family migrated north to Jersey City, New Jersey in search of a better life. There, he sang with the Central Baptist Church Choir, New Jersey's most famous Black American church choir. At Lincoln High School, he studied commercial art and was gifted enough to place his paintings with a number of New York City galleries.

In February 1947, seventeen-year-old Hamilton took his first big step into secular music, winning a talent contest at the Apollo Theater. But nothing came of it. "I couldn't get a break," Hamilton recalled. "I really had nothing different to offer. They were seeking blues singers at the time, and I didn't know any blues at all." So, to support himself while he developed the different sound and singing style he wanted, Hamilton worked as an electronics technician during the day, and an amateur heavyweight boxer at night, with a record of six wins and one defeat.

In 1948, Hamilton joined the Searchlight Gospel Singers and also studied light opera, working with New Jersey voice coach J. Martin Rolls for more than a year. Hamilton continued to perform gospel with the Searchlight Singers, in churches and at gospel concerts, until 1953 when the group broke up and each member went off in his own direction. Hamilton headed back into pop music. But this time, he felt he finally had something different to offer.

In 1948, when Hamilton was 19, he married Corene Hamilton, with whom he had five children, Rodothas Jr., Allan, Carolyn, Charnette, and Tyrone. They divorced in 1960. Hamilton later married Myrna Hamilton, with whom he had 2 sons, Roy Hamilton Jr. and Ray Hamilton. Both sons are actively involved in the music and entertainment industry.

== Music career ==
=== Epic beginning and career rise (1953–1956) ===
In mid-1953, Hamilton was discovered singing in a Newark, New Jersey night club, The Caravan, by Bill Cook, who became his manager. Cook was the first Black American radio disc jockey and television personality on the East Coast. Cook made a demo tape of Hamilton's singing and brought it to the attention of Columbia Records. Columbia was impressed enough to sign Hamilton to their rhythm and blues subsidiary, Okeh Records. On November 11, 1953, Hamilton made his first recordings for the label in New York City. The session produced Rodgers and Hammerstein's "You'll Never Walk Alone" from the musical Carousel. The tune, one of the few secular numbers that Hamilton knew at the time, had been his live-performance specialty since 1947. But before it was released, Columbia had second thoughts and placed Hamilton with their newly-launched "pop" subsidiary label Epic. In the early 1950s, there were only two black male singers who were widely accepted by white audiences as mainstream pop stars: Nat King Cole and Billy Eckstine. Epic saw that same kind of "crossover" star potential in Hamilton, placing a nearly full-page ad in the January 23, 1954 edition of Billboard magazine which read, "a great new voice makes news with a great song! Roy Hamilton, You’ll Never Walk Alone…" In spite of poor musical backing, Hamilton's performance on "Walk Alone" is sensational and is the primary reason why it topped the Billboard R&B chart for eight weeks and became a national US Top-30 hit. His follow-up single, "If I Loved You", was another Rodgers and Hammerstein tune from Carousel. Although not as big a hit for Hamilton as "Walk Alone", it still reached number four on the US R&B chart.

On the evening of July 24, 1954, Hamilton appeared on the bill of "Star Night", a concert package at Chicago's Soldier Field starring Perry Como, Nat King Cole and Sarah Vaughan. Since he was the newcomer on the bill, Hamilton was given the least amount of time to perform: six minutes, to perform two songs. Hamilton's plan was to perform "You'll Never Walk Alone", the only song he was known for at the time, and its bouncy b-side. But Perry Como squashed that plan when he announced during afternoon rehearsal that "Walk Alone" was going to be his closing number that night. Hamilton, forced into performing a "Walk Alone" replacement on the spot, decided on "Ebb Tide", a song that had been a hit for Vic Damone a few months earlier—a song that Hamilton himself hadn't yet recorded. That evening, for his second and final number, Hamilton unveiled his gospel-tinged version of "Ebb Tide" before a Soldier Field audience of 82,000. By the time he had finished singing and exited the stage, all 82,000 people were on their feet, applauding, stomping and chanting for more. Changing in his dressing room, Hamilton had to be summoned back out on stage to quiet the crowd. He returned to the stage to witness that even some of his fellow performers—Nat Cole, Sarah Vaughan and orchestra leader Ray Anthony—had joined in the ovation. On July 28, four days after his "Star Night" triumph, Epic Records had Hamilton record, "Ebb Tide". It became his third straight hit.

On Saturday night, September 11, 1954, Hamilton made his national television debut on CBS's Stage Show, hosted by big band leaders and brothers Tommy and Jimmy Dorsey. But the national television appearance that put Hamilton's career on the fast track to crossover success was the one he made on the night of March 6, 1955, when he sang "You'll Never Walk Alone" on CBS's top-rated Ed Sullivan Show. In reviewing his performance, Variety magazine summed up Hamilton's new way of singing the Great American Songbook by writing: "Hamilton made good with his single, 'You'll Never Walk Alone', which he endowed with the values of a spiritual."

Ten days after the Sullivan Show appearance, Epic, in a rushed attempt to cover singer Al Hibbler's version of "Unchained Melody", set up a recording session for Hamilton. The resulting single was shipped within five days. Two months later, in the May 18, 1955 issue of Down Beat magazine, Hamilton was named "Vocalist of the Year". Meanwhile, in Billboard magazine's May 21, 1955 issue, Hamilton's gospel-tinged "Unchained Melody" had taken over the top spot on the R&B chart while, on the pop chart, it had reached the number six spot. It was the second number-one R&B hit of his career as well as the first, and only, top-ten US pop hit of his career.

On the heels of his "Unchained Melody" success, Hamilton recorded the following Great American Songbook singles in succession: Vincent Youmans' "Without a Song" (#77 US pop), Jimmy McHugh's "Cuban Love Song", Rodgers and Hammerstein's "Everybody's Got a Home But Me" (#42 US pop), from the musical Pipe Dream, and Frank Loesser's "Somebody Somewhere", from the musical The Most Happy Fella.

=== Retirement and comeback (1956–1962) ===
In mid-1956, Hamilton, developing what was described as a "lung condition" bordering on tuberculosis, announced an indefinite retirement from show business, citing both physical and mental exhaustion When he resumed his career over a year later, Hamilton could no longer generate hit singles performing pop standards because, overnight, rock and roll had become the record industry's predominant commercial force. So, in late 1957, Epic coaxed Hamilton into recording "Don't Let Go", an R&B rocker produced by Otis Blackwell, the man who had written two of the biggest number-one hits of Elvis Presley’s career: "Don't Be Cruel" and "All Shook Up". By early 1958, "Don't Let Go" had become the second US top-15 pop hit of Hamilton's career and the first top-40 hit ever recorded in stereo.

In 1959, Hamilton appeared, in a cameo role, in the Filipino motion picture produced by People's Pictures Hawaiian Boy where he sings "Unchained Melody".

Hamilton's last hit record, "You Can Have Her" (the song spent 10 weeks on the Billboard Hot 100, reaching No. 12, while reaching No. 6 on Billboard's Hot R&B Sides chart.), came in 1961, and was followed by the album Mr. Rock And Soul (1962). The Epic label treated Hamilton as a major star and issued sixteen albums by him.

=== Later years (1963–1969) ===
By the mid-1960s, Hamilton's career declined while recording with MGM and then RCA.

In January 1969, in Memphis, Tennessee, Hamilton made the final recordings of his career. The tracks were laid down at record producer Chips Moman's American Sound Studio, at the same time Elvis Presley was recording there. Songs released from those Hamilton sessions were cover versions of James Carr's "The Dark End of the Street", Conway Twitty's "It's Only Make Believe", and "Angelica", a Barry Mann and Cynthia Weil song that had been submitted to Presley, but which he then turned over to Hamilton.

== Death ==
In early July 1969, Hamilton suffered a massive cerebral hemorrhage at his home in New Rochelle, New York. He was taken to New Rochelle General Hospital where he lay in a coma for more than a week. On July 20, 1969, he was removed from life support and died. Hamilton was 40 years old. Some connected his earlier illness that caused his retirement to his death, although a connection was never proven.

In a 2017 documentary for the BBC, Hamilton’s son Roy Hamilton Jr. revealed that Elvis Presley sent Roy's wife, Myrna, a rose every day Hamilton was in the hospital. When Hamilton died from complications of his stroke, Presley sent Myrna flowers for the following six months.

At the time of his death, Hamilton was heavily in debt, forcing him, a week before he died, to borrow heavily on his insurance policy to pay off back taxes. This prompted his widow, Myrna, to publicly seek funds for his burial. Elvis Presley is said to have covered Hamilton's outstanding medical bills and funeral costs. At Hamilton's funeral service, messages of condolence sent by Presley, Mahalia Jackson and B.B. King were read out to the mourners.

== Legacy ==
Hamilton was inducted into the Georgia Music Hall of Fame in 2010.

Hamilton was Epic Records' first star, giving the company its first number-one hit of any kind, "You'll Never Walk Alone", which topped the Billboard R&B chart for eight weeks in 1954. A year later, he gave the label its second number-one hit of any kind when his version of "Unchained Melody" topped the Billboard R&B chart for three weeks. Also, with "Unchained Melody", Hamilton became the first solo artist to deliver a top-ten pop hit for Epic.

Hamilton was the singer who inspired Sam Cooke, then a gospel music star, to switch over to secular music. Hamilton was also the one to whom Cooke first submitted his early pop-song compositions.

Hamilton's distinctive sound was a big influence on Elvis Presley's ballad singing. As author Fred L. Worth noted, "Elvis greatly admired Hamilton's singing ability and style and performed a number of his ballads in Hamilton's style." Also, The Righteous Brothers emulated Hamilton's style to create their blue-eyed soul sound. This is particularly evident in the duo's cover versions of his hits "You'll Never Walk Alone", "Ebb Tide" and "Unchained Melody".

Hamilton's "You'll Never Walk Alone" disc was brought in from the US by a sailor friend of Gerry and the Pacemakers leader Gerry Marsden. As a result, the band recorded a UK version of the song which became the anthem for Liverpool Football Club, sung by the crowd before every home game. The sailor friend noted that Marsden "puts very similar inflections into the song, trying to get it very similar to Roy Hamilton's version."

== Discography ==
=== Singles ===
Year	Titles (A-side, B-side) Both sides from same album except where indicated	Label & number	Chart positions		Album
Year	Titles (A-side, B-side) Both sides from same album except where indicated	Label & number	Billboard Hot 100	US R&B	Album
1954	"You'll Never Walk Alone" b/w "I'm Gonna Sit Right Down and Cry (Over You)"	Epic 9015	21	1	You'll Never Walk Alone
1954	"If I Loved You" b/w "So Let There Be Love"	Epic 9047	-	4	You'll Never Walk Alone
1954	"Ebb Tide" b/w "Beware"	Epic 9068	-	5	You'll Never Walk Alone
1954	"Hurt" b/w "Star Of Love" (Non-album track)	Epic 9086	-	8	You'll Never Walk Alone
1955	"I Believe" b/w "If You Are But a Dream" (from Roy Hamilton)	Epic 9092	-	-	You'll Never Walk Alone
1955	"Unchained Melody" b/w "From Here To Eternity" (Non-album track)	Epic 9102	6	1	You'll Never Walk Alone
1955	"Forgive This Fool" b/w "You Wanted To Change Me"	Epic 9111	30	10	You'll Never Walk Alone
1955	"A Little Voice" b/w "All This Is Mine"	Epic 9118	-	-	Roy Hamilton
1955	"Without a Song" b/w "Cuban Love Song"	Epic 9125	77	-	Roy Hamilton
1955	"Everybody's Got A Home" b/w "Take Me With You" (from Roy Hamilton)	Epic 9132	42	-	Non-album track
1956	"Walk Along With Kings" b/w "There Goes My Heart"	Epic 9147	-	-	The Golden Boy
1956	"Somebody Somewhere" b/w "Since I Fell for You" (from Roy Hamilton)	Epic 9160	-	-	The Golden Boy
1956	"I Took My Grief To Him" b/w "Chained"	Epic 9180	-	-	Non-album tracks
1957	"A Simple Prayer" b/w "A Mother's Love"	Epic 9203	-	-	Non-album tracks
1957	"So Long" b/w "My Faith, My Hope, My Love"	Epic 9212	-	14	Non-album tracks
1957	"To the Aisle" b/w "That Old Feeling"	Epic 9224	-	-	Non-album tracks
1957	"(All of a Sudden) My Heart Sings" b/w "I'm Gonna Lock You in My Heart"	Epic 9232	-	-	Non-album tracks
1958	"Don't Let Go" b/w "The Right To Love" (Non-album track)	Epic 9257	13	2	You Can Have Her
1958	"Crazy Feelin'" b/w "In A Dream" (Non-album track)	Epic 9268	-	-	You Can Have Her
1958	"Jungle Fever" b/w "Lips" (Non-album track)	Epic 9274	-	-	You Can Have Her
1958	"Wait For Me" b/w "Everything"	Epic 9282	-	-	Non-album tracks
1958	"Pledging My Love" b/w "My One and Only Love"	Epic 9294	45	-	With All My Love
1959	"It's Never Too Late" b/w "Somewhere Along the Way"	Epic 9301	-	-	Non-album tracks
1959	"I Need Your Lovin'" b/w "Blue Prelude" (Non-album track)	Epic 9307	62	14	At His Best
1959	"Time Marches On" b/w "Take It Easy, Joe" (Non-album track)	Epic 9323	84	-	At His Best
1959	"On My Way Back Home" b/w "A Great Romance" (from At His Best)	Epic 9342	-	-	You Can Have Her
1960	"The Ten Commandments"; Original B-side: "Nobody Knows the Trouble I've Seen"; Later B-side: "Down by the Riverside"	Epic 9354	-	-	Spirituals
1960	"The Clock" b/w "I Get The Blues When It Rains" (from Have Blues Must Travel)	Epic 9390	-	-	Non-album track
1960	"Nobody Knows the Trouble I've Seen" b/w "Down by the Riverside"	Epic 9372	-	-	Spirituals
1960	"I Get The Blues When It Rains" b/w "I Let a Song Go Out of My Heart"	Epic 9373	-	-	Have Blues Must Travel
1960	"Please Send Me Someone to Love" b/w "My Story"	Epic 9374	-	-	Have Blues Must Travel
1960	"Cheek to Cheek" b/w "Something's Gotta Give" (from Why Fight The Feeling)	Epic 9375	-	-	With All My Love
1960	"Blow, Gabriel, Blow" b/w "Sing You Sinners"	Epic 9376	-	-	Come Out Swingin'
1960	"Never Let Me Go" b/w "A Lover's Prayer" (Non-album track)	Epic 9398	-	-	You Can Have Her
1960	"Lonely Hands" b/w "Your Love"	Epic 9407	-	-	Non-album tracks
1961	"You Can Have Her" b/w "Abide With Me"	Epic 9434	12	6	You Can Have Her
1961	"You're Gonna Need Magic" b/w "To The One I Love" (Non-album track)	Epic 9443	80	-	Roy Hamilton's Greatest Hits
1961	"No Substitute For Love" b/w "Please Louise"	Epic 9449	-	-	Non-album tracks
1961	"There We Were" b/w "If (They Made Me a King)"	Epic 9466	-	-	Non-album tracks
1962	"Don't Come Cryin' To Me" b/w "If Only I Had Known"	Epic 9492	-	-	Non-album tracks
1962	"I'll Come Running Back to You" b/w "Climb Ev'ry Mountain"	Epic 9520	110	-	Non-album tracks
1962	"I Am" b/w "Earthquake"	Epic 9538	-	-	Non-album tracks
1963	"Let Go" b/w "You Still Love Him"	MGM 13138	129	-	Non-album tracks
1963	"Midnight Town-Daybreak City" b/w "Intermezzo"	MGM 13157	-	-	Non-album tracks
1963	"The Sinner" b/w "Theme From 'The V.I.P.'s'"	MGM 13175	-	-	Non-album tracks
1964	"There She Is" b/w "The Panic Is On"	MGM 13217	-	-	Non-album tracks
1964	"Unchained Melody" b/w "Answer Me My Love"	MGM 13247	-	-	Sentimental Lonely & Blue
1964	"You Can Count On Me" b/w "She Make Me Wanna Dance"	MGM 13291	-	-	Non-album tracks
1965	"Sweet Violet" b/w "A Thousand Tears Ago"	MGM 13315	-	-	Non-album tracks
1965	"Heartache (Hurry On By)" b/w "Ain't It The Truth" (from The Impossible Dream)	RCA 8641	-	-	Non-album tracks
1965	"Tore Up Over You" b/w "And I Love Her"	RCA 8705	-	-	The Impossible Dream
1966	"The Impossible Dream (The Quest)" b/w "She's Got A Heart" (Non-album track)	RCA 8813	-	-	The Impossible Dream
1966	"Walk Hand in Hand" b/w "Crackin' Up Over You"	RCA 8960	-	-	Non-album tracks
1967	"I Taught Her Everything She Knows" b/w "Lament"	RCA 9061	-	-	Non-album tracks
1967	"So High My Love" b/w "You Shook Me Up"	RCA 9171	-	-	Non-album tracks
1967	"Let This World Be Free" b/w "Wait Until Dark"	Capitol 2057	-	-	Non-album tracks
1969	"The Dark End of the Street" b/w "100 Years"	AGP 113	-	-	Non-album tracks
1969	"Angelica" b/w "Hang-Ups"	AGP 116	-	-	Non-album tracks
1969	"It's Only Make Believe" b/w "100 Years"	AGP 125	-	-	Non-album tracks
1969	"The Golden Boy" b/w "You'll Never Walk Alone" (from Roy Hamilton's Greatest Hits)	Epic 10559	-	-	Roy Hamilton's Greatest Hits Volume 2

=== Studio albums ===
Album	Music arranged and conducted by	Year	Label
With All My Love	Neal Hefti	1958	Epic
Why Fight the Feeling?	Neal Hefti	1959	Epic
Come Out Swingin'	Marion Evans	1959	Epic
Have Blues Must Travel	Marion Evans	1959	Epic
Spirituals	Chuck Sagle	1960	Epic
Soft 'n' Warm	Marion Evans	1960	Epic
Only You	Sammy Lowe	1961	Epic
Mr. Rock and Soul	Sammy Lowe and Frank Hunter	1962	Epic
Warm Soul	Marty Manning	1963	MGM
Sentimental Lonely & Blue	Dick Hyman	1964	MGM
The Impossible Dream	Sid Bass and Bert Keyes	1966	RCA Victor

=== Compilation albums ===
Album	Year	Label
You'll Never Walk Alone – 10" LP	1954	Epic
The Voice of Roy Hamilton – 10" LP	1955	Epic
Roy Hamilton	1956	Epic
You'll Never Walk Alone	1957	Epic
The Golden Boy	1957	Epic
Roy Hamilton at His Best	1960	Epic
You Can Have Her	1961	Epic
Roy Hamilton's Greatest Hits	1962	Epic
Roy Hamilton's Greatest Hits, Vol. 2	1963	Epic

== Filmography ==
- 1958: Let's Rock, appeared as himself
- 1959: Hawaiian Boy, appeared as himself. Drama, Musical

=== Television appearances ===
Date	Program	Host	Songs
September 11, 1954	Stage Show	Tommy Dorsey & Jimmy Dorsey	Unknown Songs
March 6, 1955	The Ed Sullivan Show	Ed Sullivan	"You'll Never Walk Alone" (with Ray Bloch orchestra)
May 1, 1958	American Bandstand	Dick Clark	Unknown Songs
June 15, 1958	The Steve Allen Show	Steve Allen	"Ebb Tide" (with Skitch Henderson orchestra)
June 26, 1958	American Bandstand	Dick Clark	Unknown Songs
October 17, 1958	American Bandstand	Dick Clark	Unknown Songs
January 4, 1959	The Steve Allen Show	Steve Allen	"Somewhere Along the Way" (with Skitch Henderson orchestra)
February 18, 1959	American Bandstand	Dick Clark	Unknown Songs
April 18, 1959	The Dick Clark Show	Dick Clark	Unknown Songs
June 8, 1961	American Bandstand	Dick Clark	Unknown Songs
June 16, 1961	American Bandstand	Dick Clark	Unknown Songs
June 22, 1961	American Bandstand	Dick Clark	Unknown Songs
July 26, 1961	American Bandstand	Dick Clark	Unknown Songs
December 20, 1961	American Bandstand	Dick Clark	Unknown Songs
March 23, 1964	The Mike Douglas Show	Mike Douglas	Unknown Songs

== Bibliography ==
- Guralnick, Peter (1999): Careless Love: The Unmaking of Elvis Presley, Little, Brown and Company, London. ISBN 0-316-64402-1
- Guralnick, Peter (2005): Dream Boogie: The Triumph of Sam Cooke, Little, Brown and Company, New York. ISBN 0-316-01329-3
