= My Song (Johnny Ace song) =

Single by Johnny Ace
- B-side: "Follow the Rule"
- Released: August 1952
- Genre: Blues
- Length: 3:02
- Label: Duke
- Songwriter(s): David James Mattis

Johnny Ace singles chronology
"My Song" (1952)	"Cross My Heart" (1953)

"My Song" is the 1952 debut single by Johnny Ace. Backed by The Beale Streeters, "My Song" was the first of three number one's on the US Billboard R&B chart for Johnny Ace.

== Aretha Franklin version ==
Aretha Franklin released a version of the song that reached number 10 on the U.S. R&B chart and number 31 on the Billboard Hot 100 in 1968.

== Chart performance ==
=== Johnny Ace ===
Chart	Peak position
U.S. R&B chart	1

=== Aretha Franklin ===
Chart	Peak position
U.S. R&B chart	10
Billboard Hot 100	31
