= Bobo, Coahoma County, Mississippi =

Bobo, Mississippi
- Census-designated place
- Location within Mississippi Location within the United States
- Coordinates: 34°07′45″N 90°40′52″W
- Country: United States
- State: Mississippi
- County: Coahoma
- Elevation: 164 ft (50 m)

Population (2020)
  - Total: 118
- Time zone: UTC-6 (Central (CST))
  - Summer (DST): UTC-5 (CDT)
- Area code: 662
- FIPS code: 28-07220
- GNIS feature ID: 2812718

Bobo is a census-designated place and unincorporated community in Coahoma County, Mississippi, United States. Bobo is located on U.S. routes 61 and 278, southwest of Clarksdale.

Per the 2020 Census, the population was 118.

== History ==
Bobo was named for world-champion bear hunter Robert E. Bobo. Bobo is located on the former Yazoo and Mississippi Valley Railroad and was once home to six general stores, a grocery store, and two sawmills. A post office operated under the name Bobo from 1886 to 1973.

== Demographics ==
Historical population
Census	Pop.	Note	%±
2020	118		—
U.S. Decennial Census; 2020

Bobo was first listed as a census designated place in the 2020 U.S. census.

=== 2020 census ===
Bobo CDP, Mississippi – Racial and ethnic composition Note: the US Census treats Hispanic/Latino as an ethnic category. This table excludes Latinos from the racial categories and assigns them to a separate category. Hispanics/Latinos may be of any race.
Race / Ethnicity (NH = Non-Hispanic)	Pop 2020	% 2020
White alone (NH)	18	15.25%
Black or African American alone (NH)	93	78.81%
Native American or Alaska Native alone (NH)	0	0.00%
Asian alone (NH)	0	0.00%
Native Hawaiian or Pacific Islander alone (NH)	0	0.00%
Other race alone (NH)	0	0.00%
Mixed race or Multiracial (NH)	0	0.00%
Hispanic or Latino (any race)	7	5.93%
Total	118	100.00%

== Notable people ==
- Junior Parker, Memphis blues singer
- Joe Willie Wilkins, blues musician, grew up on a plantation near Bobo.
