= Johnny Ace =

American R&B singer (1929–1954)

- Ace in 1954

Background information
- Born: John Marshall Alexander Jr. June 9, 1929; Memphis, Tennessee, U.S.
- Died: December 25, 1954 (aged 25) Houston, Texas, U.S.
- Cause of death: Accidental self-inflicted shot
- Genre: R&B
- Occupations: Singer, musician
- Instruments: Vocals, piano
- Years active: 1949–1954
- Labels: Duke, Flair

John Marshall Alexander Jr. (June 9, 1929 – December 25, 1954), known by the stage name Johnny Ace, was an American rhythm-and-blues singer. He had a string of hit singles in the mid-1950s. He emerged as a prominent figure in postwar R&B and gained fame with hits such as "My Song", "Cross My Heart", and "Pledging My Love". Ace's smooth vocal style and romantic ballads made him a popular artist, particularly on R&B radio stations and jukeboxes. At the height of his career, he toured extensively and was regarded as one of the most promising young stars in the genre.

He died on Christmas Day 1954 by accidentally shooting himself backstage in Houston, Texas at the age of 25. He remains a significant figure in early R&B history, with later artists covering his songs and citing him as an inspiration.

"Pledging My Love", produced by Johnny Otis and featuring Otis on vibraphone, became a posthumous hit and has been recorded by numerous musicians across different genres.

== Life and career ==
John Alexander was born in Memphis, Tennessee, to Leslie Newsome and preacher John Marshall Alexander, and grew up near LeMoyne-Owen College. He dropped out of high school to join the United States Navy. Alexander was reportedly AWOL for much of his duty. After he was discharged, Alexander joined Adolph Duncan's Band as a pianist, playing around Beale Street in Memphis. The network of local musicians became known as the Beale Streeters, which included B. B. King, Bobby Bland, Junior Parker, Earl Forest, and Roscoe Gordon. Initially, they were not an official band, but at times there was a leader and they played on each other's records.

In 1951, Ike Turner, a talent scout and producer for Modern Records, arranged for Alexander and other Beale Streeters to record for Turner's label. Alexander played piano on some of King's records for RPM Records and backed King during broadcasts on WDIA in Memphis. When King departed for Los Angeles and Bland left the group, Alexander took over both Bland's vocal duties and King's radio show on WDIA.

David James Mattis, program director at WDIA and founder of Duke Records, claimed that he gave Alexander the stage name of Johnny Ace: "Johnny" for Johnny Ray and "Ace" for the Four Aces, but Alexander's younger brother St. Clair Alexander claimed that the singer himself came up with the name Ace when Mattis changed his first name from John to Johnny.

Ace signed to Duke in 1952 and released his first recording, "My Song", an urbane "heart ballad" which topped the R&B chart for nine weeks beginning in September. He began heavy touring, often with Willie Mae "Big Mama" Thornton. In the next two years, Ace had eight hits in a row, including "Cross My Heart", "The Clock", "Saving My Love for You", "Yes, Baby", "Please Forgive Me", "Never Let Me Go" and "Pledging My Love".

After Ace had success as a solo artist, the Biharis brothers at Modern released the single "Mid Night Hours Journey" on their subsidiary label Flair Records in September 1953. The flip side was "Trouble and Me" by Earl Forest.

In November 1954, Ace ranked No. 16 on the Billboard 1954 Disk Jockey Poll for R&B Favorite Artists. In December 1954, he was named the Most Programmed Artist of 1954, according to the results of a national poll of disc jockeys conducted by the U.S. trade weekly Cash Box. Ace's recordings sold very well during those times. Early in 1955, Duke Records announced that three of his 1954 recordings, along with Thornton's "Hound Dog", had sold more than 1,750,000 copies.

== Personal life ==
Ace met Lois Jean Palmer, a freshman at Booker T. Washington High School, in 1949. Ace's parents did not know he and Palmer were dating until Palmer became pregnant. Ace and Palmer were married in Earle, Arkansas, on July 17, 1950; she was 16 and he was 21. Their son, Glenn Alexander, was born later that year. Ace moved Palmer into his parents' home in Memphis. Ace was barred from the home for playing blues music, so he mostly took residence at the Mitchell Hotel, owned by Sunbeam Mitchell, in Memphis. He had another child with his wife, daughter Janet Alexander, but the couple were rarely together due to his womanizing lifestyle, and by 1953 he had abandoned his family. He also had another son named Larry Saunders, who became a singer. Ace is also the biological grandfather of singer Ledisi.

== Death ==
After touring for a year, Ace had been performing at the City Auditorium in Houston, Texas, on Christmas Day 1954. During a break between sets, he was playing with a .32 caliber revolver. Members of Ace's band said he did this often, sometimes shooting at roadside signs from their car.

It was widely reported that Ace killed himself playing Russian roulette. However, Curtis Tillman, who was Thornton's bass player, witnessed the event. Tillman later said: "I will tell you exactly what happened! Johnny Ace had been drinking and he had this little pistol he was waving around the table and someone said 'Be careful with that thing…' and he said 'It's okay! Gun's not loaded… see?' and pointed it at himself with a smile on his face and 'Bang!' — sad, sad thing. Big Mama ran out of the dressing room yelling 'Johnny Ace just killed himself!'"

Big Mama Thornton said in a written statement (included in the book The Late Great Johnny Ace) that Ace had been playing with the gun but not playing Russian roulette. According to Thornton, Ace pointed the gun at his girlfriend and another woman who were sitting nearby but did not fire. He then pointed the gun toward himself, bragging that he knew which chamber was loaded. The gun went off, shooting him in the side of the head. According to his biographer Nick Tosches, Ace shot himself with a .32 pistol, not a .22, and it happened little more than an hour after he had bought a new 1955 Oldsmobile.

Ace's funeral was held on January 2, 1955, at Clayborn Temple AME church in Memphis. It was attended by an estimated 5,000 people. His remains were buried at New Park Cemetery in Memphis.

"Pledging My Love" was a posthumous R&B number 1 hit for ten weeks beginning February 12, 1955. As Billboard bluntly put it, Ace's death "created one of the biggest demands for a record that has occurred since the death of Hank Williams just over two years ago." Thus Johnny Ace became the first act to reach the Billboard pop charts only after death. His single recordings were compiled and released as The Johnny Ace Memorial Album.

== Legacy ==
Rock-and-roll historian Harry Hepcat noted that "Johnny Ace was a crooner who sounded like Johnny Mathis with soul... Soon after the death of Johnny Ace, Varetta Dillard recorded 'Johnny Has Gone' for Savoy Records in early 1955. She incorporated many of Ace's song titles in the lyrics. This was the first of the many teen tragedy records that were to follow in the later 50s and early 1960s."

In addition to Dillard's "Johnny Has Gone", at least four other tribute records to Ace were released in 1955: Frankie Ervin's "Johnny Ace's Last Letter"; The Rovers' "Salute To Johnny Ace"; Linda Hayes' "Why, Johnny, Why?"; and The Five Wings’ "Johnny's Still Singing".

Bob Dylan and Joan Baez performed "Never Let Me Go" on tour with the Rolling Thunder Revue in 1975. Luther Vandross covered this song in 1993 as the title track to his eighth studio album. Elvis Presley recorded "Pledging My Love" in his last studio session, in 1976; the song appeared on the album Moody Blue in 1977.

Paul Simon wrote and performed the song "The Late Great Johnny Ace" (1983), in which a boy, upon hearing of the death of Ace, orders a photograph of the deceased singer: "It came all the way from Texas/With a sad and simple face/And they signed it on the bottom/From the Late Great Johnny Ace." The song develops a touching counterpoint with the death of two other Johnnies – John Lennon and John F. Kennedy.

David Allan Coe covered "Pledging My Love", introducing the song with his own recollections of hearing the news of Ace's death.

Ace is mentioned in "House Band in Hell", by Root Boy Slim, and in the song "Johnny Ace", by Dash Rip Rock.

"Pledging My Love" was used in the 1973 film Mean Streets, directed by Martin Scorsese; the 1983 film Christine, directed by John Carpenter; the 1985 film Back to the Future, directed by Robert Zemeckis; and the 1992 film Bad Lieutenant, directed by Abel Ferrara.

The Teen Queens' song "Eddie My Love", originally entitled "Johnny My Love", was written in memory of Ace.

The Swiss singer Polo Hofer and the Schmetterband wrote the song "Johnny Ace" in 1985; it was released on the album Giggerig. Will Oldham noted Ace's death in the lyrics of his song "Let the Wires Ring", on his 2000 album Guarapero/Lost Blues 2.

Dave Alvin's 2011 album Eleven Eleven, contains the song "Johnny Ace Is Dead", about Ace's death.

The Squirrel Nut Zippers' Christmas album, Christmas Caravan (1998), contains the song "A Johnny Ace Christmas", a love song about Ace killing himself on Christmas.

== Discography ==
=== Singles ===
Original singles, all issued simultaneously on 78- and 45-rpm discs by Duke Records

- "My Song" / "Follow the Rule" (1952)
- "Cross My Heart" / "Angel" (1953)
- "The Clock" / "Aces Wild" (1953)
- "Saving My Love for You" / "Yes, Baby" (the B-side is a duet with Willie Mae "Big Mama" Thornton) (1954)
- "Please Forgive Me" / "You've Been Gone So Long" (1954)
- "Never Let Me Go" / "Burley Cutie" (instrumental) (1954)
- "Pledging My Love" / "Anymore" / "No Money" (1955), No. 1 on U.S. R&B chart for 10 weeks, peaked at No. 17 on U.S. Pop chart
- "Anymore"/ "How Can You Be So Mean" (1955)
- "So Lonely" / "I'm Crazy Baby" (1955)
- "Don't You Know" / "I Still Love You So" (1956)

One split single, issued on 78- and 45-rpm discs by Flair Records

- "Mid Night Hours Journey" (Johnny Ace) / "Trouble and Me" (Earl Forest) (1953)

=== Albums ===
Studio albums and compilations containing only or mostly recordings by Ace

- Memorial Album for Johnny Ace, Duke (1955) (later editions often titled Memorial Album)
- Johnny Ace: Pledging My Love, Universal Special Products (1986)
- Johnny Ace: The Complete Duke Recordings, Geffen (2004)
- The Chronological Johnny Ace: 1951–1954, Classics (Blues & Rhythm series) (2005)
- Johnny Ace: Essential Masters, Burning Fire, digital download (2008)
- Johnny Ace: Aces Wild! (The Complete Solo Sides and Sessions), Fantastic Voyage (2012)

== Bibliography ==
- Bashe, Patricia Romanowski; George-Warren, Holly; Pareles, Jon (1995). The New Rolling Stone Encyclopedia of Rock & Roll (rev. updated ed.). New York: Fireside. ISBN 0-684-81044-1.
- Rees, Dafydd; Crampton, Luke (1991). Rock Movers and Shakers. Santa Barbara: ABC-CLIO. ISBN 0-87436-661-5.
- Rock On: The Illustrated Encyclopedia of Rock n' Roll: The Solid Gold Years: 1974. 1982: Thomas Y. Crowell Company, Harper & Row: New York. ISBN 0-06-181642-6.
- Bergman, Steve (March 27, 2023). Earth Angels: The Short Lives and Controversial Deaths of Three R&B Pioneers. Texas A&M University Press.
