= Malcolm Yelvington =

American musician

- Born: September 14, 1918
- Died: February 21, 2001 (aged 82)
- Formerly of: Star Rhythm Boys

Malcolm Yelvington (September 14, 1918 – February 21, 2001) was an American rockabilly and country musician. Born in Covington, Tennessee, he released a record on Sun Records in 1956, just after Elvis Presley.

Yelvington began performing in local venues at the age of 14, having learned to sing and play guitar as a boy. His voice was a baritone, somewhat comparable to Ernest Tubb (one of Yelvington's major influences). He continued with mostly local engagements into his 20s, and was passed over for military service in World War II because of his health. In the late 1940s, he began playing with Reece Fleming's band, The Tennesseans, at the Memphis Gem Theater. This group disbanded in 1952, and several of its members, including Yelvington, picked up with local troupe the Star Rhythm Boys. They performed daily on local radio and had a steady and popular gig at the Clover Club north of Covington, but family attachments prevented most of the players from traveling or touring with the group. Yelvington began playing side gigs in Memphis whenever he wasn't playing with the Star Rhythm Boys.

Yelvington and guitarist Gordon Mashburn first heard word of Sam Phillips's Sun Records in 1953, and arranged a meeting. Philips was initially unimpressed with Yelvington and the Star Rhythm Boys, because he was not interested in recording straight-ahead country music; however, he thought the band had potential, and had them audition a large number of songs. The first cut he recorded with them was a blues number written by Stick McGhee called "Drinkin' Wine Spo-Dee-O-Dee". The result was a record with blues roots and a blues feel but a steel guitar that sounded unmistakably country. This recording was issued on Sun Records immediately after Elvis Presley's "That's All Right Mama". Phillips did not give Yelvington promotional backing, and so he and the band self-marketed the record to local stations, to little avail. The record was picked up neither by blues nor by country radio stations, each of which seemed to think it sounded too much like the other.

"Drinkin' Wine Spo-Dee-O-Dee" was one out of only two records Yelvington cut for Sun. In 1955 he released a single, "Yakety Yak" (not the same tune as "Yakety Yak" by The Coasters), on competitor Meteor Records. The record was released under the name Mac Sales and the Esquire Trio so as to avoid legal action by Phillips, to whom he was still contractually obliged. In 1956, Yelvington recorded again with Sun, releasing the rockabilly track "Rockin' With My Baby".

Yelvington, now in his late thirties, was not excited about the rockabilly sound, and by 1958 he and his band members parted ways. Yelvington struck out on his own as a solo artist, but had no luck and eventually quit music, concentrating on raising his family of five children. He was essentially forgotten until the 1980s, when popular music historians began digging into the Sun back catalogue; fans and concert promoters attempted to bring him out of retirement. His career saw a resurgence in Memphis as a rockabilly revivalist, and in 1997, he released his first full-length album at the age of 79. By the time of his death in 2001, in Memphis, he was regarded as an elder statesman of country music and rockabilly.

A live show in the Netherlands during his first European tour in 1988 was taped and released on Collector Records (CLCD 4403) in 1991. In 2006, Bear Family Records reissued his Sun Records recordings on compact disc.

On February 22, 2018, the song "Drinkin' Wine Spo-Dee-O-Dee" b/w "Just Rolling Along" by Malcolm Yelvington and the Star Rhythm Boys was accepted into the Rock 'n' Roll Hall of Fame.

== Discography ==
Year	Title	Record label
1955	"Drinkin’ Wine Spo-Dee-O-Dee" / "Just Rolling Along"	Sun Records
1955	"Yakety Yak" / "A Gal Named Joe"	Meteor Records
1957	"Rockin’ With My Baby" / "It's Me, Baby"	Sun Records
	"Have My Self a Ball"; "Rock and Roll With My Baby"; "Goodbye Marie"; "I’ve Got The Blues (Way Down Blues)"; "Mr. Blues"; "My First and Last Love"; "Trumpet"	Sun Records (not issued)

== General references ==
- Malcolm Yelvington at AllMusic
