= Harry Hepcat =

American singer-songwriter

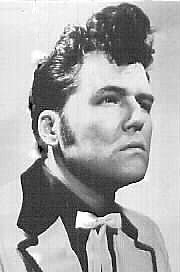

Background information
- Born: Early 1940s Columbia, South Carolina, U.S
- Genres: blues, rock and roll, doo-wop
- Occupations: Artist, Writer, Band Leader, Songwriter, Singer, Radio DJ, Guitarist and Performer
- Website: www.harryhepcat.com

Harry Hepcat is an American first-generation rock and roll artist, performing rock and roll, blues, doo-wop and rockabilly over seven decades. He is noted as a singer, guitarist, band leader, songwriter, radio disc-jockey, writer and media personality. A 1981 review stated, "His honest sense of fun distinguishes him from humorless idol-worshipers and from slapstick cretins..." He was a frequent guest on WCBS-FM in 'New York City' (The Doo-Wop Shop) and, at the other end of the rock spectrum, was one of the first listed in the Rockabilly Hall of Fame in 1998 and featured on the organization's first CD. Elvis Presley once said of him, to George Anderson, "Harry Hepcat is like a brother, not by blood, but by what he does."

== Biography ==
Harry Hepcat was born in Columbia, South Carolina. His grandfather had played trumpet in a band before World War I. His mother, Irene, was a music lover who often sang around the house and played her 78 rpm records. Her dream of being a chorus line dancer ended when she became pregnant. Hepcat's father went off to fight in France and never returned.

By 1955, Harry lived in New York City and then moved to Long Island. As such, he developed a love of the rock bands he encountered on the Island and the group harmony of the city. His radio was tuned to WINS and Alan Freed's "Rock & Roll Party" and to Jocko's "Rocketship Show" on WADO. He even was seen as one of the dancers on Alan Freed's TV show. Seeing Bo Diddley at Freed's stage reviews and Elvis on television led to Harry's first guitar in February 1956.

Harry played in half a dozen bands through the early 1960s. He kept up with the latest music, but always saw fit to preserve older material. The shows were primarily in the northeastern United States, with some tours of the Midwest and southern border states. There were recordings for several small labels and then on to Old Town and Ace records. Soon, there were LPs released in Germany and a release in England and Japan. The reviews were positive. Wayne Robbins of Newsday wrote that, "Hepcat's 'Boppin' the Blues' is fine!"

Good Times Magazine referred to Harry Hepcat as "a true practitioner of rockabilly and good old rock and roll since the music first appeared." Rockabilly magazine, in reviewing Hepcat's "Real to Reel" album, wrote that he "developed uninhibited" and his remastered early cuts "illustrate an unbridled classic-form rock'n'roller deserving of wider acclaim than was his."

In commenting on "Harry Hepcat's Stories of the 50s" CD, WCBS-FM disc jockey Don K. Reed describes Hepcat as "a rockabilly rocker from way back who's lost nothing over the years and can tell a story in song with the best of them." The album songs and stories are Hepcat originals. Rock critic Darren Paltrowitz calls the CD "the real deal...listening to it will show you just how similar the story-telling of 'the Boss' Springsteen is to that of Hepcat. Harry Hepcat is a visionary indeed."

As for the many Harry Hepcat releases in Europe, Harry was quoted as saying of the Europeans, "The appreciation for American rockabilly and 50s rock and roll is because they know it's our music and it's the real thing when we do it. When they do it, they're imitating an American art form and they know that deep down."

In 1967, Harry Hepcat decided on preserving the music and styles of the fifties and early sixties. In an age of acid rock, hippies and protest movements, most agents and venues considered that idea insane. At one of the early concerts at Hofstra University, on Long Island, the over enthusiastic students rioted, turning over slide show equipment and destroying band signs and a poster photo of Alan Freed. In spite of this, the times finally caught up with Harry and the fifties revival was on.

Harry Hepcat started off in the fifties playing house parties and school auditoriums. In the decades to follow, he was playing for some of the biggest hotels in New York City (Roosevelt Hotel, Hotel Pierre), the Westbury Music Fair, Tavern on the Green in Central Park, Manhattan, the Neville and the Concord in the Catskills and before 10,000 people at The Long Island Arena and similarly massive crowds in a series of concerts at Yonkers Raceway. The New York City club scene featured Harry and his band at clubs like Malachy's, Dangerfield's and Brandy's II. After performing for the Broadway cast of "Grease," they commented, "We only act it: it's such a pleasure to hear the real thing."

Preserving the cultural story of the 1950s also led to Harry Hepcat's ideas being published in several newspapers and magazines. He soon expanded the public's exposure to fifties music by becoming one of the first rock musicians to open up new outdoor venues to the material. Harry Hepcat & The Boogie Woogie Band now added rock music to parks and arenas that had previously only featured light classical, pop, dixieland and march music. Harry rocked the out-of-doors at The Garden State Arts Center in New Jersey, the Levitt Pavilion in Westport, Connecticut and dozens of city and town parks. His music programs soon appeared in another unheard of location for rock music, various library systems. Hepcat's program soon became approved by the Board of Co-operative Educational Services (BOCES) in 1975 and school performances soon followed as part of music appreciation programs. "Hepcat has not only opened the ears of the MTV generation through his speeches, he has reminded everyone of rock and roll's history through his writings."

== Radio ==
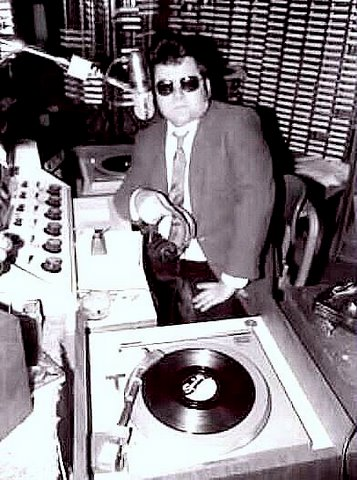
Harry Hepcat on the air at WNYG in New York

Harry Hepcat was a frequent guest on numerous radio programs. He was heard as a guest on WCBS-FM in New York City on "The Doo-wop Shop" for ten broadcasts in the 1970s and 1980s; "The Sally Jesse Raphael Show" WMCA (Feb.1977 and Sept. 1977); Alan Colmes Show WABC (1984); saluted on "Spotlight" WRTN-FM, Westchester County, NY in 1979; featured artist on "Street Beat" WLIR Hempstead, N.Y. 1981; three live radio concerts WPKN-FM Bridgeport, Connecticut, 1975–1978; one hour interview and performance on Vermont Public Radio (VPR) 1993; twelve 2 hour specials on rock music for WBAB-FM on Long Island. He went on to host his own show on WNHX in Berlin, New Hampshire, fill-in host WPKN-FM Bridgeport, Connecticut, and from 1988 to 1994 was broadcasting 33 hours a week with his own shows on WNYG 1440 am in the New York City area. Hepcat reached most of Long Island, Queens, Brooklyn, and southern areas of the Bronx, Westchester and Connecticut. His programs included "The Gooba Gooba Show," "The Hardcore Oldies Show" and "The Rockabilly Party."

== Television Work ==
Among Harry Hepcat's television appearances was a New York City concert review (with performance clips) on WCBS television news by Dennis Cunningham in 1981; mentioned on "Real People" WNBC-TV in 1977; a feature on Hepcat's life on "Nightlife TV" WLNY-TV channel 55; interviews and performances on Cablevision, Viacom Cable, Group W (Westinghouse Broadcasting), Westchester Cable; two features on Eyewitness News WABC-TV in New York City (11/8/83 and 11/11/83) and ten guest interviews and performances on The Joe Franklin Show WOR-TV (WWOR-TV) in New York City (1978–1984). Joe Franklin referred to Harry Hepcat as "the official archivist and historian of the 1950s rock and roll scene."

Harry also developed comedy characters and was a regular on "Huntington Profiles" from 1983 to 1984 on Huntington Cable TV. Then it was on to "Depth in Focus," a comedy show that revolved around the local entertainment scene (1985). From 2005 to 2012, Hepcat had his own show on Cablevision that dealt with nostalgia, music and comedy. One of these was "Antiques Roadkill," which dealt with inexpensive and/or ugly artifacts often referred to as "kitsch". In 2001, Harry Hepcat hosted one of the segments for the History Channel's "American Classics". This documentary on American pop culture from the 1950s to the 1970s also featured Dick Clark and Jay Leno.

== Film ==
Harry Hepcat went on to films. In 1985, he played the part of a businessman in the independent film "Daze Gone By" for Jedu Films. In the Robin Williams film "Seize the Day," Harry drove his 1954 Mercury and almost ran over Robin's legs with his car. Based on Saul Bellow's book, the 1986 Academy Award-winning film also starred Jerry Stiller and Joseph Wiseman. Harry is in the last scene leaving a tenement in Harlem; the big cigar, gold suit and sideburns are hard to miss.

Harry Hepcat turned his energies to writing, producing and directing a documentary on teen life in an American small town in the 1950s. On August 26, 1988, he was presented with first prize for an independent production by The Motion Picture and Television Community at the Fifth Annual Suffolk Film and Video Festival. The award was presented by Suffolk County Executive Patrick Halpin at the estate of Robert Lion Gardiner in East Hampton, Long Island. The Harry Hepcat documentary was called "Teen Beat."

== Discography ==
Singles
RECORD COMPANY Catalogue #	TITLE	YEAR
SCOTT 6184 (USA)	"Weekend Wail" / "Coastin"	1958
SONIC 5066 (USA)	"That's All Right Mama" / "The Break of Day"	1964
GRAFFITI 101-A, B (New York City, USA); Streakin USA: See note #1 below See re-release on CD list below.	"Streakin' U.S.A." / "Little Darlin'"	1974
DEE-JAY JAMBOREE 106 (Germany)	"Go Cat Go" / "Mean Cat Daddy" (under the name Harold Jackson)	1975
RESURRECTION 6380 (USA)	"Sea Cruise" / "Great Balls of Fire"	1977

EPs: Extended Play
RECORD COMPANY Catalogue #	TITLE	YEAR
REBOP 965 (Cincinnati, Ohio, USA)	HARRY HEPCAT: "Good Rockin' Tonight" / "Shake, Rattle & Roll" "Boogie Chillun" / "Go Cat, Go"	1976
AETERNUS EPA-102 (Long Island, NY, USA)	SUNRISE SPECIAL: "The Sunrise Special" / "Twenty Flight Rock" / "Bull Jive" / "Boppin' the Blues"	1981

LPs: Long Play (vinyl)
RECORD COMPANY Catalogue #	TITLE	YEAR
DEE-JAY; JAMBOREE DJ-LP 2048 (Germany)	"GO CAT, GO"; All 14 cuts by Harry Hepcat	1985
BISON BOP; LP Vol.2 Bb-LP 2001 (Germany); See note #2 below	"THE BOP THAT NEVER STOPPED" side A, cut #3, "Milkcow Blues Boogie"	1979
NERVOUS records 048 (England)	"AMERICAN ROCKABILLY"; Side A, cut #3 "Gonna Slice You Baby" (psychobilly version)	12"vinyl edition 1988; CD edition 1994
HEPCAT CASSETTE (USA)	"REAL TO REEL" Early Sessions; 19 cuts by Harry Hepcat; Released on CD 2008.	1997

CDs: Compact Disc
RECORD COMPANY Catalogue #	TITLE	YEAR
X LG 7022 (New York City, USA)	"RAUNCHY ROCK & ROLL" "Streakin' U.S.A."; Cut #8	1995
J!MCO Records; JICK-89197 (Japan)	"AMERICAN NEO-ROCKABILLY COLLECTION" cut #3 "Gonna Slice You Baby"	1994
"ROCKABILLY HALL OF FAME"; Vol. One, cut#19 (USA)	"Drinkin" Wine"	1998
MP3 #692944273658-10503 (USA)	"CRUISIN' WITH HARRY HEPCAT"; 10 cuts by Hepcat.	1999
AETERNUS 102456 (USA)	"STORIES OF THE 50s" 13 cuts by Hepcat (original stories & songs)	1999
ACE Records; Number CDCHD 825 (USA)	"21st CENTURY DOO-WOP" "Darling Lorraine"; Cut #21	2002
EARLY BIRD Records; EBCD 1006 (USA)	"MICKEY B's JUKEBOX REVIEW"; Vol. 2, cut#9 "Baby I Love You So"	2003
AETERNUS (USA)	"DOO WOP SESSIONS"; 16 cuts by Hepcat (collection of released and unreleased doo wop renditions)	2010

Internet
RECORD COMPANY Catalogue #	TITLE	YEAR
iTunes	"Then And Now"	2011

Unreleased
RECORD COMPANY Catalogue #	TITLE	YEAR
OLD TOWN Records (USA)	"Walking the Dog" / "Evil" / "Runaway"	
GRAFFITI Records (New York City, USA)	"Teenager in Love" / "Guardian Angel" / "I've Had It"	

Notes

1. In 1976, as a special tribute, a limited edition of "Streakin' U.S.A." was released on Edison cylinder records.
2. On a limited number of Bison Bop 2001 issues Harry Hepcat was identified as Harold Jackson by error and the album had the wrong photo. These copies were released first. When the change was made Hepcat was correctly identified and the album was given a new back cover that featured a large picture of Hepcat.
