= Hearts and Bones =

Studio album by Paul Simon
- Released: November 4, 1983
- Recorded: 1981–1983
- Studios: Warner Bros., Hollywood; Atlantic, New York City; Power Station, New York City; Sigma Sound, New York City; Regent Sound, New York City; Mediasound, New York City
- Genres: Pop, rock
- Length: 40:53
- Label: Warner Bros.
- Producers: Roy Halee; Paul Simon; Russ Titelman; Lenny Waronker

Paul Simon chronology
One-Trick Pony (1980)	Hearts and Bones (1983)	Graceland (1986)

Hearts and Bones is the sixth solo studio album by American singer-songwriter Paul Simon. It was released in 1983 by Warner Bros. Records.

== Background ==
The album was originally intended to be called Think Too Much, but Mo Ostin, president of Warner Bros. Records at the time, persuaded Simon to change it to Hearts and Bones. The album was written and recorded following Simon & Garfunkel's The Concert in Central Park in 1981, and the world tour of 1982–1983. Several songs intended for Think Too Much were previewed on tour, and Art Garfunkel worked on some of the songs with Simon in the studio, with an intention that the finished product would be an all-new Simon & Garfunkel studio album. The album, particularly the title song, was a reflection on Paul's relationship with actress Carrie Fisher, and Paul felt that it was too personal to be a Simon & Garfunkel album, instead deciding that it should be a solo album. This greatly annoyed Garfunkel and ensured that there would never again be another Simon & Garfunkel album. Garfunkel left the project and Simon erased all his vocals and reworked the material into a solo album.

On "Think Too Much (a)", Steve Ferrone was contacted by Nile Rodgers to attend a recording session at the Power Station to record drums. After the initial attempts at recording the song were met with silence from Simon, Rodgers experimented with various effects on his rhythm guitar, which made the instrument out of synch with the original drum track. Despite Rodgers' insistence that the effects would render it difficult to overdub a new drum track, Ferrone eventually achieved a satisfactory take.

== Reception ==
Professional ratings
Review scores
Source	Rating
AllMusic	4.5/5 stars
The Boston Phoenix	3/4 stars
Chicago Tribune	3/4 stars
Entertainment Weekly	B
The Guardian	3/5 stars
PopMatters	8/10
Rolling Stone	4/5 stars
The Rolling Stone Album Guide	4/5 stars
Uncut	5/5 stars
The Village Voice	B+

Hearts and Bones charted for 18 weeks on the Billboard 200, peaking at No. 35, although it is considered to be a relative commercial failure compared to Simon's other recordings.

Don Shewey of Rolling Stone concluded that the album "is all about heart versus mind, thinking versus feeling, and how these dichotomies get in the way of making music or love". He went on to call the songs "subtle", but added, "the music has a certain playfulness that matches the album's cerebral self-consciousness." Billboard said that the album was "well worth the wait" and represented Simon's "best work in nearly a decade". In 1986, Robert Christgau of The Village Voice referred to the album as being "a finely wrought dead end".

In retrospective reviews, William Ruhlmann of AllMusic called Hearts and Bones Simon's "most personal collection of songs, one of his most ambitious, and one of his best". Ruhlmann praised the lyrical handling of the subject of romance and the music's blending of doo-wop and rock and roll roots with contemporary styles. David Bloom of PopMatters found the album to be "riskier, both musically and lyrically", than its predecessor, One-Trick Pony (1980), "and more engrossing for it". He observed that the album was "so tied to Simon's escalating preoccupation with physical and emotional remoteness that it's hard to imagine anyone being surprised when it failed to move a fan base waiting for the next 'Late in the Evening'".

== Track listing ==
All tracks are written by Paul Simon, except for the closing of "The Late Great Johnny Ace", composed by Philip Glass.

Side one
No.	Title	Length
1.	"Allergies"	4:37
2.	"Hearts and Bones"	5:37
3.	"When Numbers Get Serious"	3:25
4.	"Think Too Much (b)"	2:44
5.	"Song About the Moon"	4:07
Total length:		20:30

Side two
No.	Title	Length
1.	"Think Too Much (a)"	3:05
2.	"Train in the Distance"	5:11
3.	"Rene and Georgette Magritte with Their Dog after the War"	3:44
4.	"Cars Are Cars"	3:15
5.	"The Late Great Johnny Ace"	4:45
Total length:		20:00 40:30

2004 CD reissue bonus tracks
No.	Title	Length
1.	"Shelter of Your Arms" (Unreleased Work-in-Progress)	3:11
2.	"Train in the Distance" (Original Acoustic Demo)	3:13
3.	"René and Georgette Magritte with Their Dog after the War" (Original Acoustic Demo)	3:46
4.	"The Late Great Johnny Ace" (Original Acoustic Demo)	3:22
Total length:		13:32 54:02

== Personnel ==
Musicians

- Paul Simon – lead vocals, background vocals, acoustic guitar (1, 2, 4, 5, 10), electric guitars (8), LinnDrum programming (9)
- Dean Parks – electric guitars (1, 4, 5, 7, 10), hi-strung guitar (2)
- Al Di Meola – guitar solo (1)
- Anthony Jackson – contrabass guitar (1–5, 7, 8, 9)
- Steve Gadd – drums (1, 2, 4, 5, 10)
- Jeff Porcaro – drums (7)
- Steve Ferrone – additional drums (1), drums (3, 6)
- Greg Phillinganes – Fender Rhodes (1, 5, 10)
- Rob Sabino – synthesizers (1, 9), acoustic piano (8)
- Rob Mounsey – synthesizers (1), vocoder (5)
- Airto Moreira – percussion (1–4, 7)
- Richard Tee – Fender Rhodes (2, 7, 8), keyboards (3), acoustic piano (4), synthesizers (8)
- Mike Mainieri – vibraphone (2, 7), marimba (2, 4),
- Eric Gale – electric guitars (3)
- Sid McGinnis – electric guitars (10)
- Tom Coppola – Synclavier (3–6)
- Marcus Miller – bass guitar (4, 7)
- Bernard Edwards – bass guitar (6)
- Nile Rodgers – electric guitars (6, 9), LinnDrum programming (9)
- Jesse Levy – cello (7)
- Peter Gordon – French horn (7)
- Mark Rivera – alto saxophone (7)
- Wells Christie – Synclavier (8)
- The Harptones – backing vocals (8)
- Michael Boddicker – synthesizer (10)
- Michael Riesman – synthesizers (10)
- Carol Wincenc – flute (10)
- George Marge – bass clarinet (10)
- Marin Alsop – violin (10)
- Frederick Zlotkin – cello (10)
- Jill Jaffe – viola (10)
- David Nichtern – Synclavier programming

The uncredited horn section on "Allergies" and "Cars Are Cars" are Mark Rivera (saxophones), Jon Faddis and Alan Rubin (trumpets).

Technical

- Paul Simon – producer
- Russ Titelman – producer
- Roy Halee – producer, engineer, mixing
- Lenny Waronker – co-producer (1, 5, 10)
- Lee Herschberg – additional engineer
- Jason Corsaro – additional engineer
- Mark Linett – additional engineer
- Gene Paul – additional engineer
- James Dougherty – additional engineer
- Eric Korte – second engineer
- Andy Hoffman – second engineer
- Terry Rosiello – second engineer
- David Greenberg – second engineer
- Stuart Gitlin – second engineer
- Ken Deane – second engineer
- Dan Nash – second engineer
- Jim Santis – second engineer
- Greg Calbi – mastering
- Tom Bates – digital engineer
- Wayne Yurgelin – digital audio facilities
- Julie Hooker – production assistant
- Kimberly Boyle – production assistant
- Jeffrey Kent Ayeroff – art direction
- Paula Greif – art direction
- Jeri McManus – design
- E.K.T.V. – cover photo
- Arthur Elgort – inner photo
- David Matthews – horn arrangements (1, 9)
- The Harptones – background vocal arrangements (8)
- George Delerue – orchestration (8)
- Philip Glass – orchestration (10)
- Michael Riesman – orchestra conductor (10)

== Chart positions ==
Chart (1983)	Peak position
Australian Albums (Kent Music Report)	99
Canadian Albums (RPM)	50
Dutch Mega Albums (MegaCharts)	14
French Albums (SNEP)	19
German Albums (Media Control)	51
Japanese Albums (Oricon)	30
Norwegian Albums (VG-lista)	3
Spanish Albums (Promusicae)	27
Swedish Albums (Sverigetopplistan)	11
Swiss Albums (Schweizer Hitparade)	25
UK Albums	34
US Billboard Top LPs	35
