= You Can Have Her =

- Japanese release picture sleeve

Single by Roy Hamilton
- B-side: "Abide with Me"
- Released: January 3, 1961
- Genre: R&B
- Length: 2:46
- Label: Epic
- Songwriter: Bill Cook

"You Can Have Her" is a song written by Bill Cook. The song was a hit single for Roy Hamilton in 1961 and Sam Neely in 1974. It has also been recorded by many other artists, including Jerry Lee Lewis, Charlie Rich, Waylon Jennings, and Jim Ed Brown. Elvis Presley performed an impromptu version at his Inglewood Forum, LA, Afternoon Show on May 11, 1974.

In 1961, Roy Hamilton's version spent 10 weeks on the Billboard Hot 100, reaching No. 12, while reaching No. 6 on Billboard's Hot R&B Sides chart.

A 1965 version by the Righteous Brothers reached #67 on the singles chart. Dionne Warwick also released a version in 1965, titled "You Can Have Him", included on her album The Sensitive Sound of Dionne Warwick. In 1961, Dalida and Johnny Hallyday recorded a French version, titled "Tu peux le/la prendre".

With lyrics in Swedish by Stig Anderson, using the Stig Rossner pseudonym, the song was recorded by Swedish actress and recording artist Anita Lindblom, titled "Sånt är livet" and released as a single in October 1961. She also recorded English ("You Can Have Him") and German ("Laß die Liebe aus dem Spiel") versions.

"Sån't är livet" became Lindblom's big break in Sweden; it topped the Swedish charts for several weeks and sold more than 150,000 copies. She also performed the song in the 1961 film Vi fixar allt.

The single charted on the Norwegian VG chart for 22 weeks in 1962, topping the chart for seven weeks.

Anne-Lie Rydé recorded the song on the 1992 covers album Stulna kyssar.
