= The Late Great Johnny Ace =

Song by Paul Simon

from the album Hearts and Bones
- Written: 1981
- Released: 1983
- Genre: Rock
- Length: 4:45
- Label: Warner Bros
- Songwriter: Paul Simon

"The Late Great Johnny Ace" is a song by Paul Simon, which appears on his 1983 Hearts and Bones album.

== History ==
The song initially sings of the rhythm and blues singer Johnny Ace, who died of a self-inflicted gunshot injury in 1954. Folklore attributed Ace's death to a game of Russian roulette, though eyewitnesses claimed that the shooting was not Russian roulette but accidental recklessness.

Simon goes on to refer to former Beatle John Lennon, who was murdered on December 8, 1980, as well as John F. Kennedy who was assassinated in 1963. The following year, Beatlemania started (Simon was living in London at the time), and in the song's lyrics, Simon refers to both the Beatles and the Rolling Stones. In an interview for a Cinemax special promoting Hearts and Bones, Simon said that Ace's death was the "first violent death that I remember", and noted that Kennedy and Lennon became the "Johnny Aces" of their time with their subsequent murders.

The album version features a one-minute coda composed by Philip Glass, performed with strings, clarinet, and flute; Marin Alsop, the violinist on that session, was later to become the conductor of the Baltimore Symphony Orchestra.

The 2004 reissue of Hearts and Bones also contains a solo acoustic demo of the song. However, there is an error in the third stanza of the mention of the year at the time of recording. Simon mistakenly mentioned "1956" instead of "1954", the actual year of Johnny Ace's death.

== Live performances ==
The song was first performed live by Paul Simon during the Simon & Garfunkel reunion Concert in Central Park in September 1981. Near the end of the performance, an audience member rushed the stage, causing Simon to pull away from the microphone. The man was quickly pulled away by security and was heard yelling "I gotta talk to you, I gotta talk to you", after which he finished the song. The performance was included in the subsequent video and DVD releases of the concert but was omitted from the live album. Simon also performed the song several times during Simon & Garfunkel's subsequent 1983 tour.

In an interview on Late Night with David Letterman on May 20, 1982, Simon discussed the Central Park experience with David Letterman. Halfway through, Simon stopped the song when one of the strings on the guitar was caught by a fret and almost broke, and the host quickly took the show to commercial. Simon jokingly observed that he had to stop the song almost at the exact same point after the Central Park incident and said he doubted whether he should ever do the song again. However, he finished the song when the show returned from commercial.

Simon performed the song again on Saturday Night Live on November 22, 1986, the 23rd anniversary of the John Kennedy assassination (the performance opened with a still shot of Kennedy to mark the occasion). He also performed the song in 2000 in Paris for a filmed concert to promote his album You're the One. Simon first performed the Johnny Ace classic "Pledging My Love" before launching into his song.

== Personnel ==
- Paul Simon – vocals, acoustic guitar
- Dean Parks, Sid McGinnis – electric guitars
- Steve Gadd – brushed drums, drums
- Greg Phillinganes – Fender Rhodes
- Michael Boddicker – synthesizer
- Philip Glass – orchestration
- Michael Riesman – synthesizer, conductor
- Jill Jaffe – viola
- Marin Alsop – violin
- Frederick Zlotkin – cello
- George Marge – bass clarinet
- Carol Wincenc – flute
