= Junior Parker =

American blues singer (1932–1971)

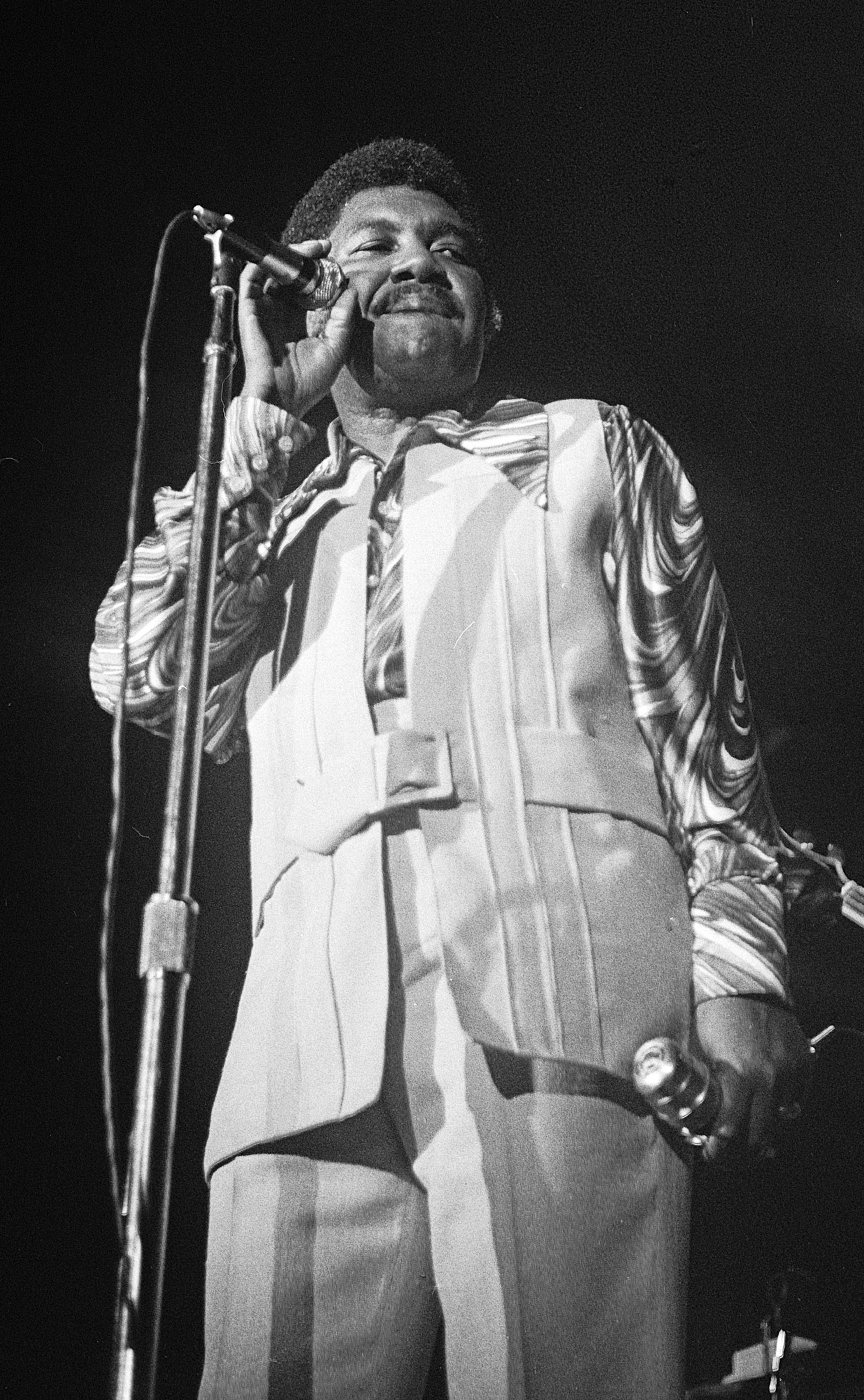
- Parker at the 1970 Ann Arbor Blues Festival

Background information
- Also known as: Little Junior Parker
- Born: Herman Parker Jr. March 27, 1932; Near Bobo, Mississippi, U.S.
- Died: November 18, 1971 (aged 39) Blue Island, Illinois, U.S.
- Genres: Blues; soul blues
- Occupation: Musician
- Instruments: Vocals; harmonica
- Years active: 1951–1971
- Labels: Modern; Sun; Duke; Mercury; Capitol; Minit

Herman "Junior" Parker (March 27, 1932 – November 18, 1971), also known as Little Junior Parker, was an American blues singer and harmonica player. He is best remembered for his voice which has been described as "honeyed" and "velvet-smooth". One music journalist noted, "For years, Junior Parker deserted down home harmonica blues for uptown blues-soul music". In 2001, he was inducted into the Blues Hall of Fame. Parker is also inducted into the Mississippi Musicians Hall of Fame.

== Life and career ==
There is some disagreement over the details of Parker's birth, but most reliable sources now indicate that he was born in March, 1932 at Eastover Plantation near Bobo, Coahoma County, Mississippi. He moved with his mother to West Memphis, Arkansas, during the 1940s. Other birth dates in 1927 or 1932 have been suggested, and some research suggests that his name at birth was registered as Herbert Parker.

He sang in gospel groups as a child and, beginning in his teenage years, played on various blues circuits. His biggest influence as a harmonica player was Rice Miller a.k.a. Sonny Boy Williamson II, with whom he worked before moving on in 1949 to work for Howlin' Wolf. Around 1950, he began performing with a coalition of performers in Memphis known as the Beale Streeters, which included Bobby "Blue" Bland and B. B. King.

Bland was drafted into the U.S. Army in 1952 and was discharged in 1955.

In 1951, Parker formed his own band, the Blue Flames, with guitarist Pat Hare. In 1952, Ike Turner who was working as a talent scout for Modern Records discovered Parker. Turner recorded his first release, "You're My Angel" / "Bad Women, Bad Whiskey," with Turner playing piano and Matt "Guitar" Murphy on guitar. This record brought him to the attention of Sam Phillips, and he and his band signed with Sun Records in 1953. There they produced three successful songs with Matt's brother Floyd on electric guitar: "Feelin' Good" (which reached number 5 on the US Billboard R&B chart), "Love My Baby," and "Mystery Train", a cover version of which was recorded by Elvis Presley. For Presley's version of "Mystery Train", Scotty Moore borrowed the guitar riff from Parker's "Love My Baby", played by Pat Hare. "Love My Baby" and "Mystery Train" became rockabilly standards.

Later in 1955, Parker joined Duke Records and toured with Bobby Bland and Buddy Ace. Parker and Bland headed the successful Blues Consolidated Revue which regularly performed on the southern blues circuit. He continued to have a string of hits on the R&B chart, including the smooth "Next Time You See Me" (1957); remakes of Roosevelt Sykes's song "Driving Wheel" (1961), "Annie Get Your Yo-Yo" (1962), Robert Johnson's "Sweet Home Chicago", Guitar Slim's "The Things That I Used to Do" (1963), and Don Robey's "Mother-in-Law Blues" (1956), plus his own "Stand by Me" (1961).

His success was limited after he left Duke in 1966. He recorded for various labels including Mercury, Blue Rock, Minit, and Capitol. His final chart hit came in 1971 with "Drowning on Dry Land" on Capitol, which peaked at number 48 on the Billboard R&B chart.

== Death ==
Parker died on November 18, 1971, at age 39, in Blue Island, Illinois, during surgery for a brain tumor. His next album was released by United Artists Records in 1972, titled I Tell Stories Sad and True, I Sing the Blues and Play Harmonica Too, It Is Very Funky. Reviewing it in Christgau's Record Guide: Rock Albums of the Seventies (1981), Robert Christgau said, "Once a big man on the blues circuit, Parker was turning into the forgotten Beale Streeter by the time he died... and this is a respectful farewell ... Never as penetrating as B.B. or Bobby, Parker smooths his way over the arrangements with the calm of a man who was mellow before the concept existed, at least in its present deracinated form. Highlight: the sad, true story that goes with 'Funny How Time Slips Away.'"

== Legacy ==
On the 1974 album ...Explores Your Mind, Al Green dedicated his song "Take Me to the River" to Parker, whom he described in the song's spoken introduction as "a cousin of mine who's gone on, and we'd kinda like to carry on in his name".

In 2001, Parker was inducted into the Blues Hall of Fame. He is also inducted into the Mississippi Musicians Hall of Fame.

In 2011, Parker was honored with a marker on the Mississippi Blues Trail in Bobo.

== Discography ==
=== Albums ===
- Blues Consolidated, 1958 (Duke DLP-72)
- Driving Wheel, 1962 (Duke DLP-76)
- The Best of Junior Parker, 1967 (Duke DLP-83)
- Like It Is, 1967 (Mercury SR 61101) also issued as Baby Please, 1967 (Wing SRW-16401)
- Honey-Drippin' Blues, 1969 (Blue Rock SRB-64004)
- Little Jr. Parker: Blues Man, 1969 (Minit 24024)
- Jimmy McGriff/Junior Parker [AKA Chicken Fried Soul], 1971 (United Artists UAS-5597) also issued as Jimmy McGriff with Junior Parker, 1972 (United Artists UAS-6814) - live recording
- You Don't Have to Be Black to Love the Blues, 1971 (Groove Merchant GM-502) also issued in 1972 as Blue Shadows Falling for the UK market.
- Love Ain't Nothin' but a Business Goin' On, 1971 (Groove Merchant GM-513) reissue of The Outside Man, 1970 (Capitol ST-564)
- The Dudes Doin' Business, 1970 (Capitol ST-569) also issued as Good Things Don't Happen Every Day (with Jimmy McGriff), 1972 (Groove Merchant GM-2205)
- I Tell Stories Sad and True, I Sing the Blues and Play Harmonica Too, It Is Very Funky, 1972 (United Artists UAS-6823)
- Sometimes Tomorrow My Broken Heart Will Die, 1973 (ABC/Bluesway BLS-6066)

==== Compilations ====
- The ABC Collection, 1976 (ABC Records AC-30010), compilation of Duke singles
- Junior's Blues: The Duke Recordings, Vol. 1, 1992 (MCA 10669), recorded 1951–1964
- Backtracking: The Duke Recordings, Vol. 2, 1998 (MCA 11786), recorded 1953–1966
- I'm So Satisfied: The Complete Mercury & Blue Rock Recordings, 1998 (Mercury 558549), recorded 1966–1969
- The Chronological Little Junior Parker 1952–1955, 2006 (Classics 'Blues & Rhythm Series' 5167)
- Ride With Me, Baby: The Singles 1952–1961, 2012 (Fantastic Voyage FVDD-138), 2-CD set

==== Other appearances ====
- 1966: Freedom Together! with Jaki Byard (Prestige)
- 1976: Sun – The Roots Of Rock, Volume 1: Catalyst (Charly)
- 1984: Sun's Greatest Hits (Rhino)
- 1991: The Ultimate Sun Blues Collection (Disky)
- 1992: The Best Of The Blues Singers, Vol. III (LRC Records)
- 2006: Children Of Men / Original Motion Picture Soundtrack (Hip-O Records)

=== Singles ===
- "You're My Angel" / "Bad Women, Bad Whiskey", Little Junior Parker & His Blue Flames, with Ike Turner, 1952 (Modern 864)
- "Feelin' Good" / "Fussin' and Fightin' Blues", Little Junior's Blue Flames, 1953 (Sun 187), R&B No. 5
- "Love My Baby" / "Mystery Train", Little Junior's Blue Flames, 1953 (Sun 192)
- "Dirty Friend Blues" / "Can't Understand", Little Junior Parker with Bill Johnson's Blue Flames, 1954 (Duke 120)
- "Please Baby Blues" / "Sittin', Drinkin' and Thinkin'", Little Junior Parker with Bill Johnson's Blue Flames, 1954 (Duke 127)
- "Backtracking" / "I Wanna Ramble", Little Junior Parker & the Blue Flames Orchestra, 1955 (Duke 137)
- "Driving Me Mad" / "There Better Not Be No Feet (in Them Shoes)", Little Junior Parker & His Orchestra, 1955 (Duke 147)
- "Mother-in-Law Blues" / "That's My Baby", Little Junior Parker with Bill Harvey's Band, 1956 (Duke 157)
- "Next Time You See Me" / "My Dolly Bee", Little Junior Parker with Bill Harvey's Band, 1957 (Duke 164), Pop No. 74, R&B No. 7
- "That's Alright" / "Pretty Baby", Little Junior Parker and His Combo, 1957 (Duke 168)
- "Peaches" / "Pretty Little Doll", Little Junior Parker with Al Smith's Orchestra, 1957 (Duke 177)
- "Wondering" / "Sitting and Thinking", Little Junior Parker & His Band, 1958 (Duke 184)
- "Barefoot Rock" / "What Did I Do", Little Junior Parker & His Band, 1958 (Duke 193)
- "Sweet Home Chicago" / "Sometimes", Little Junior Parker & His Band, 1958 (Duke 301), R&B No. 13
- "I'm Holding On" / "Five Long Years", Little Junior Parker & His Band, 1959 (Duke 306), R&B No. 13
- "Stranded" / "Blue Letter", Little Junior Parker & His Band, 1959 (Duke 309)
- "Dangerous Woman" / "Belinda Marie", Little Junior Parker, 1959 (Duke 315)
- "You're on My Mind" / "The Next Time", Little Junior Parker & His Band, 1960 (Duke 317)
- "That's Just Alright" / "I'll Learn to Love Again", Little Junior Parker, 1960 (Duke 326)
- "Stand by Me" / "I'll Forget About You", Little Junior Parker, 1960 (Duke 330), R&B No. 11
- "Driving Wheel" / "Seven Days", Junior Parker, 1961 (Duke 335), Pop No. 85, R&B No. 5
- "In the Dark", R&B No. 7 / "How Long Can This Go On", R&B No. 28, Little Junior Parker, 1961 (Duke 341)
- "Annie Get Your Yo-Yo" / "Mary Jo", Little Junior Parker, 1961 (Duke 345), Pop No. 51, R&B No. 6
- "I Feel Alright Again" / "Sweeter as the Days Go By", Little Junior Parker, 1961 (Duke 351)
- "Someone Somewhere" / "Foxy Devil", Little Junior Parker, 1962 (Duke 357), Pop No. 95
- "It's a Pity" / "Last Night", Little Junior Parker, 1963 (Duke 362)
- "If You Don't Love Me" / "I Can't Forget About You", Junior Parker, 1963 (Duke 364)
- "Yonders Wall" / "The Tables Have Turned", Junior Parker, 1963 (Duke 367)
- "Strange Things Happening" / "I'm Gonna Stop", Little Jr. Parker, 1964 (Duke 371), Pop No. 99, R&B No. 26
- "The Things I Used to Do" / "That's Why I'm Always Crying", Junior Parker, 1964 (Duke 376)
- "Jivin' Woman" / "I'm in Love", Junior Parker, 1964 (Duke 384)
- "Crying for My Baby" / "Guess You Don't Know (The Golden Rule)", Junior Parker, 1965 (Duke 389), R&B No. 36
- "These Kind of Blues, Part 1" / "These Kind of Blues, Part 2", Junior Parker, 1965 (Duke 394)
- "Goodbye Little Girl" / "Walking the Floor Over You", Junior Parker, 1966 (Duke 398)
- "Get Away Blues" / "Why Do You Make Me Cry", Junior Parker, 1966 (Duke 406)
- "Man or Mouse" / "Wait for Another Day", Junior Parker, 1966 (Duke 413), R&B No. 27
- "Just Like a Fish" / "Baby, Please", Junior Parker, 1967 (Mercury 72620)
- "You Can Make It if You Try" / "(Ooh Wee Baby) That's the Way You Make Me Feel", Junior Parker, 1967 (Mercury 72651)
- "Country Girl" / "Sometimes I Wonder", Junior Parker, 1967 (Mercury 72672)
- "I Can't Put My Finger on It" / "If I Had Your Love", Junior Parker, 1967 (Mercury 72699), R&B No. 48
- "Hurtin' Inside" / "What a Fool I Was", Junior Parker, 1967 (Mercury 72733)
- "It Must Be Love" / "Your Love's All over Me", Junior Parker, 1968 (Mercury 72793)
- "Lover to Friend" / "I Got Money", Junior Parker, 1968 (Blue Rock/Mercury 4064)
- "Lovin' Man on Your Hands" / "Reconsider Baby", Jr. Parker, 1968 (Blue Rock/Mercury 4067)
- "I'm So Satisfied" / "Ain't Gon' Be No Cutting Aloose", Junior Parker, 1969 (Blue Rock/Mercury 4080), R&B No. 48
- "You Can't Keep a Good Woman Down" / "Easy Lovin'", Junior Parker, 1969 (Blue Rock/Mercury 4088)
- "Worried Life Blues" / "Let the Good Times Roll", Little Jr. Parker, 1969 (Minit 32080), R&B No. 34
- "The Outside Man" / "Darling Depend on Me", Junior Parker, 1970 (Capitol 2857)
- "Lady Madonna" / "Tomorrow Never Knows", Junior Parker, 1970 (Capitol 2951)
- "Drowning on Dry Land" / "River's Invitation", Junior Parker, 1971 (Capitol 2997), Pop No. 114, R&B No. 48
- "Way Back Home" / "Sweet Home Chicago", Junior Parker, 1971 (Groove Merchant 1002)
- "I Like Your Style" / "I Need Love So Bad", Junior Parker, 1971 (Groove Merchant 1004)
- "Love Ain't Nothin' but a Business Goin' On" / "A Losing Battle", Junior Parker, 1971 (Groove Merchant 1010)
- "I Need Love So Bad" / "Pretty Baby", Jimmy McGriff & Junior Parker, 1971 (United Artists 50826)
- "Funny How Time Slips Away" / "No-One Knows (What Goes on When the Door Is Closed)", Junior Parker, 1971 (United Artists 50855)
- "Your Love Is All over Me" / "You Better Quit It" (instrumental), Junior Parker, 1974 (Jetstream 818)

==== Unissued singles ====
- 1953: "Feelin' Bad", Little Junior's Blue Flames (Sun unissued master)
- 1954: "Sittin' at the Bar", Little Junior's Blue Flames (Sun unissued master)
- 1954: "Sittin' at the Window", Little Junior's Blue Flames (Sun unissued master)
- 1954: "Sittin', Drinkin' and Thinkin'", Little Junior's Blue Flames (Sun unissued master)
- 1955: "Can You Tell Me, Baby", Little Junior Parker & His Orchestra (Duke unissued master)
- 1955: "Bachelor's Blues", Little Junior Parker & His Orchestra (Duke unissued master)
