= Duke Records =

American record label

- Founded: 1952
- Country of origin: United States

Duke Records was an American record label, started in Memphis, Tennessee, in 1952 by David James Mattis (WDIA program director and DJ) and Bill Fitzgerald, owners of Tri-State Recording Company. Their first release was Roscoe Gordon singing "Hey Fat Girl", issued on Duke R-1, later amended to R-101.

== History ==
After forming a partnership with Mattis in the summer of 1952, Don Robey (founder of Houston's Peacock Records) took control of Duke. Both labels then headquartered at his Bronze Peacock club at 2809 Erastus Street in Houston, focusing on R&B and gospel music. Robey started a subsidiary, Back Beat Records, in 1957 and this later specialised in soul music, along with Sure Shot Records, whilst Peacock specialised in gospel recordings.

Duke's leading artist was Bobby "Blue" Bland who stayed with the label for many years until its demise, mostly recording successfully with arranger/bandleader Joe Scott. Johnny Ace was a major R&B artist in the early years of the label before his death at a young age, with a string of R&B top 10 hits including three that went to number one. Junior Parker was another important presence on Duke, recording a long string of singles for the label between 1953 and 1966, scoring seven top-twenty Billboard hits during his tenure.

Robey sold his labels to ABC Dunhill Records on 23 May 1973. The Duke labels were soon closed down with the imprints retained by ABC in their catalog, with only Bobby Bland being retained by the new parent label.

== Label variations ==
=== Independent distribution ===
- 1953–1958 Gospel series: White and purple label
- 1952–1961 Standard series: Gold and dark purple label
- 1961–1972: Orange and yellow label for commercial copies, purple and white label for promotional copies

=== ABC distribution ===
- 1972–1973: Dark green label

== Artists ==
Notable artists who recorded on Duke, Peacock and Back Beat included:

- Buddy Ace
- Johnny Ace
- Bobby "Blue" Bland
- Clarence 'Gatemouth' Brown
- Carl Carlton
- James "Thunderbird" Davis
- Larry Davis
- Ernie K-Doe
- Roscoe Gordon
- Roy Head
- Joe Hinton
- Long John Hunter
- Little Frankie Lee
- Junior Parker
- Fenton Robinson
- Otis Rush
- Big Mama Thornton
- Lavelle White
- Lester Williams
- O.V. Wright

== Current ownership ==
Universal Music Group now controls the Robey labels, via their acquisition (as MCA Records) of ABC Records in 1979.

== See also ==
- List of record labels

== Bibliography ==
- Louis Cantor. Wheelin' on Beale. New York: Pharos Books, 1992, ISBN 978-0886876333
