= Europe '72: The Complete Recordings =

Live album and box set by Grateful Dead
- Released: September 1, 2011
- Recorded: April 7 – May 26, 1972
- Genre: Rock
- Length: 70:47:25
- Label: Rhino
- Producer: David Lemieux

Grateful Dead chronology
Road Trips Volume 4 Number 4 (2011)	Europe '72: The Complete Recordings (2011)	Europe '72 Volume 2 (2011)

Grateful Dead concert box set chronology
Formerly the Warlocks (2010)	Europe '72: The Complete Recordings (2011)	Spring 1990 (2012)

Europe '72: The Complete Recordings is a box set of live recordings by the rock band the Grateful Dead. Billed as a "mega box set", it contains all of the band's spring 1972 concert tour of Europe—22 complete shows, on 73 CDs. It was released on September 1, 2011.

All 22 concerts from Europe '72: The Complete Recordings were also produced as individual albums, most of them on three or four CDs. They were released in chronological order, in four batches, from October to December 2011. Each of the individual album covers features artwork by Scott McDougall, inspired by the front and back cover art that was created by Stanley Mouse and Alton Kelley for the original Europe '72 album.

== Production ==
The CDs for the album were created by remastering the original 16-track analog tapes. The set was mastered in HDCD format. This provides enhanced sound quality when played on CD players with HDCD capability, but is fully compatible with conventional CD players.

The collection was first announced on January 19, 2011, and was described as consisting of "over 60" CDs; the final CD count was 73. Initially, the set was offered as a limited edition of 7,200 copies, each of which is encased in a box that looks like a steamer trunk, and includes an illustrated hardcover book and other bonus material. The first 3,000 of these sets are personalized with a name of the buyer's choice. The demand was much greater than anticipated, and all 7,200 sets were sold online within four days. In response to the ongoing demand, additional copies of the set were released, dubbed Europe '72: The Complete Recordings — All the Music Edition, which have individual packaging for each concert, with liner notes, but which do not include the steamer trunk case, the book, or the other extras. Before they sold out, both the regular edition and the All the Music edition were priced at $450.

== Other albums from the Europe '72 tour ==
Four previous live albums were taken from the band's 1972 European tour. Europe '72 was released in 1972 as a triple LP, and later rereleased as double CD, and has vocal tracks that were overdubbed in the recording studio. Hundred Year Hall is a two-disc CD taken from the April 26 concert in Frankfurt. Steppin' Out with the Grateful Dead: England '72 is a four-disc CD of selections from various concerts in England. And Rockin' the Rhein with the Grateful Dead, on three discs, contains the complete concert from April 24 in Düsseldorf.

A new collection, Europe '72 Volume 2, released a few weeks after the box set, features two CDs of performances selected from the Complete Recordings. None of the songs on this album were included in Europe '72.

Lyceum '72: The Complete Recordings contains the last four concerts of the Europe '72 tour, which were performed on May 23 to May 26 at the Lyceum Theatre in London. It was released as a 24-LP vinyl box set on July 29, 2022. Lyceum Theatre, London, England 5/26/72 contains the last concert of the tour, as a four-disc CD, and was released on the same date.

The LP Dark Star, containing only the song "Dark Star" from the May 4, 1972, concert at the Olympia Theatre in Paris, was released on April 21, 2012, for Record Store Day.

The May 3, 1972, concert at the Olympia Theatre in Paris was released as a six-disc vinyl LP on June 12, 2021, as part of Record Store Day.

The April 8, 1972, concert at Wembley Empire Pool in London was released as a five-disc vinyl LP on April 23, 2022, as part of Record Store Day.

The April 7, 1972, concert at Wembley Empire Pool in London was released as a five-disc vinyl LP on November 25, 2022, as part of Record Store Day Black Friday.

== Concerts ==
Europe '72: The Complete Recordings contains the following concerts:

Date	City	Country	Venue
April 7, 1972	London	England	Empire Pool
April 8, 1972	London	England	Empire Pool
April 11, 1972	Newcastle upon Tyne	England	Newcastle City Hall
April 14, 1972	Copenhagen	Denmark	Tivoli Concert Hall
April 16, 1972	Aarhus	Denmark	Stakladen
April 17, 1972	Copenhagen	Denmark	Tivoli Concert Hall
April 21, 1972	Bremen	West Germany	Beat-Club
April 24, 1972	Düsseldorf	West Germany	Rheinhalle
April 26, 1972	Frankfurt	West Germany	Jahrhunderthalle
April 29, 1972	Hamburg	West Germany	Musikhalle
May 3, 1972	Paris	France	Olympia
May 4, 1972	Paris	France	Olympia
May 7, 1972	Bickershaw	England	Bickershaw Festival
May 10, 1972	Amsterdam	Netherlands	Concertgebouw
May 11, 1972	Rotterdam	Netherlands	Grote Zaal
May 13, 1972	Lille	France	Esplanade du Champ de Mars
May 16, 1972	Luxembourg City	Luxembourg	Villa Louvigny
May 18, 1972	Munich	West Germany	Kongressaal
May 23, 1972	London	England	Lyceum Theatre
May 24, 1972	London	England	Lyceum Theatre
May 25, 1972	London	England	Lyceum Theatre
May 26, 1972	London	England	Lyceum Theatre

== Personnel ==
=== Grateful Dead ===
- Jerry Garcia – lead guitar, vocals, pedal steel guitar (on "Looks Like Rain"), organ (on "Good Lovin'")
- Donna Jean Godchaux – vocals
- Keith Godchaux – piano
- Bill Kreutzmann – drums
- Phil Lesh – electric bass, vocals
- Ron "Pigpen" McKernan – organ, harmonica, percussion, vocals
- Bob Weir – rhythm guitar, vocals

=== Production ===
- Produced for release by David Lemieux
- Tape transfers and wow and flutter correction by John K Chester and Jamie Howarth, Plangent Processes
- Mixed by Jeffrey Norman at Prairie Sun Recording, Cotati, California
- CD mastering by David Glasser at Airshow Mastering, Boulder, Colorado
- Recording by Betty Cantor, Janet Furman, Bob Matthews, Rosie, Wizard
- Cover illustrations by Scott McDougall
- Package design by Steve Vance
- Liner notes written by Gary Lambert, Rosie McGee, Larry Rogers, Palle Lykke, Blair Jackson, David Gans, Steve Silberman, Jeff Tamarkin, Simon Robinson, Nicholas Meriwether, Sam Cutler, Chris Jones, Alex Allan

== Track listing ==
=== Europe '72, Vol. 1: Wembley Empire Pool, London, England (4/7/1972) ===
Album released October 3, 2011
Length 163:28 (2:43:28)

Disc 1

First set:

1. "Greatest Story Ever Told" (Bob Weir, Mickey Hart, Robert Hunter) – 5:24 (Note: Intro by Sam Cutler previously released on Steppin' Out with the Grateful Dead: England '72.)
2. "Sugaree" (Jerry Garcia, Hunter) – 7:08
3. "Chinatown Shuffle" (Ron "Pigpen" McKernan) – 3:02
4. "Me and My Uncle" (John Phillips) – 3:38
5. "China Cat Sunflower" (Garcia, Hunter) – 5:33 →
6. "I Know You Rider" (traditional, arranged by Grateful Dead) – 5:14
7. "Big Boss Man" (Al Smith, Luther Dixon) – 4:38 (Note: "Big Boss Man" inexplicably stopped being recorded with less than a minute to go in the song. Also, it appears "Casey Jones" was performed later in the same set, but was not recorded.)
8. "Black-Throated Wind" (Weir, John Perry Barlow) – 5:55
9. "Loser" (Garcia, Hunter) – 6:55
10. "Mr. Charlie" (McKernan, Hunter) – 4:56
11. "Beat It On Down the Line" (Jesse Fuller) – 3:58
12. "Tennessee Jed" (Garcia, Hunter) – 7:02

Disc 2

1. "Playing in the Band" (Weir, Hart, Hunter) – 10:04

Second set:

2. "Truckin' " (Garcia, Phil Lesh, Weir, Hunter) > – 10:53
3. "Drums" (Bill Kreutzmann) – 2:39 →
4. "The Other One" (Weir, Kreutzmann) – 19:36 (Note: Previously released on Steppin' Out with the Grateful Dead: England '72.) →
5. "El Paso" (Marty Robbins) – 4:44 →
6. "The Other One" (Weir, Kreutzmann) – 8:20 →
7. "Wharf Rat" (Garcia, Hunter) – 10:58

Disc 3

1. "Ramble On Rose" (Garcia, Hunter) – 6:21
2. "Sugar Magnolia" (Weir, Hunter) – 7:56
3. "Not Fade Away" (Norman Petty, Charles Hardin) – 4:19 (Note: Also released on Europe '72 Volume 2.) →
4. "Goin' Down the Road Feeling Bad" (traditional, arranged by Grateful Dead) – 6:08 →
5. "Not Fade Away" (Petty, Hardin) – 3:42

Encore:

6. "One More Saturday Night" (Weir) – 4:36

=== Europe '72, Vol. 2: Wembley Empire Pool, London, England (4/8/1972) ===
Album released October 3, 2011
Length 177:59 (2:57:59)

Disc 1

First set:

1. "Bertha" (Garcia, Hunter) – 7:44
2. "Me and My Uncle" (Phillips) – 3:20
3. "Mr. Charlie" (McKernan, Hunter) – 3:56
4. "Deal" (Garcia, Hunter) – 4:54
5. "Black-Throated Wind" (Weir, Barlow) – 6:02
6. "Next Time You See Me" (William Harvey, Earl Forest) – 4:32
7. "Cumberland Blues" (Garcia, Lesh, Hunter) – 5:56 (Note: Previously released on Europe '72.)
8. The Yellow Dog Story (traditional, arranged by Bob Weir) – 3:13 (Note: Previously released on the Europe '72 reissue as a bonus track.)
9. "Brown-Eyed Women" (Garcia, Hunter) – 5:08
10. "Beat It On Down the Line" (Fuller) – 3:35
11. "Tennessee Jed" (Garcia, Hunter) – 7:18

Disc 2

1. "Playing in the Band" (Weir, Hart, Hunter) – 11:28
2. "Good Lovin' " (Rudy Clark, Arthur Resnick) – 10:43
3. "Looks Like Rain" (Weir, Barlow) – 7:57
4. "Casey Jones" (Garcia, Hunter) – 6:29

Second set:

5. "Truckin' " (Garcia, Lesh, Weir, Hunter) – 11:52
6. "Big Railroad Blues" (Noah Lewis, arranged by Grateful Dead) – 4:29 (Note: Previously released on Steppin' Out with the Grateful Dead: England '72.)
7. "Hurts Me Too" (Elmore James, Marshall Sehorn) – 5:56

Disc 3

1. "Dark Star" (Garcia, Hart, Kreutzmann, Lesh, McKernan, Weir, Hunter) > – 32:09 (Note: An excerpt of this track was previously released on Glastonbury Fayre.)
2. "Sugar Magnolia" (Weir, Hunter) > – 7:17
3. "Caution (Do Not Stop on Tracks)" (Grateful Dead) – 18:30

Encore:

4. "One More Saturday Night" (Weir) – 5:46

=== Europe '72, Vol. 3: City Hall, Newcastle, England (4/11/1972) ===
Album released October 3, 2011
Length 202:18 (3:22:18)

Disc 1

First set:

1. "Greatest Story Ever Told" (Weir, Hart, Hunter) – 5:43
2. "Deal" (Garcia, Hunter) – 5:38
3. "Mr. Charlie" (McKernan, Hunter) – 4:03
4. "Black-Throated Wind" (Weir, Barlow) – 6:29
5. "Tennessee Jed" (Garcia, Hunter) – 7:14
6. "Big Boss Man" (Smith, Dixon) – 6:52
7. "Beat It On Down the Line" (Fuller) – 3:25
8. "Sugaree" (Garcia, Hunter) – 7:23 (Note: Previously released on Steppin' Out with the Grateful Dead: England '72.)
9. "Jack Straw" (Weir, Hunter) – 5:11
10. "Chinatown Shuffle" (McKernan) – 2:47
11. "China Cat Sunflower" (Garcia, Hunter) > – 6:31
12. "I Know You Rider" (traditional, arranged by Grateful Dead) – 5:56

Disc 2

1. "Playing in the Band" (Weir, Hart, Hunter) – 10:53
2. "Next Time You See Me" (Harvey, Forest) – 5:24
3. "Brown-Eyed Women" (Garcia, Hunter) – 4:33
4. "Looks Like Rain" (Weir, Barlow) – 7:12
5. "Big Railroad Blues" (Lewis, arranged by Grateful Dead) – 3:33
6. "Casey Jones" (Garcia, Hunter) – 6:01

Second set:

7. "Good Lovin' " (Clark, Resnick) – 15:27
8. "Ramble On Rose" (Garcia, Hunter) – 6:14

Disc 3

1. "Truckin' " (Garcia, Lesh, Weir, Hunter) > – 19:26
2. "Drums" (Kreutzmann) > – 3:18
3. "The Other One" (Weir, Kreutzmann) > – 25:47
4. "Comes a Time" (Garcia, Hunter) – 7:55
5. "Sugar Magnolia" (Weir, Hunter) – 7:50

Encore:

6. "Brokedown Palace" (Garcia, Hunter) – 6:58
7. "One More Saturday Night" (Weir) – 4:52

=== Europe '72, Vol. 4: Tivoli Concert Hall, Copenhagen, Denmark (4/14/1972) ===
Album released October 3, 2011
Length 206:16 (3:26:16)

Disc 1

First set:

1. "Bertha" (Garcia, Hunter) – 6:32
2. "Me and My Uncle" (Phillips) – 3:27
3. "Mr. Charlie" (McKernan, Hunter) – 4:46
4. "You Win Again" (Hank Williams) – 4:01
5. "Black-Throated Wind" (Weir, Barlow) – 6:07
6. "Chinatown Shuffle" (McKernan) – 2:52
7. "Loser" (Garcia, Hunter) – 6:34 (Note: Also released on Europe '72 Volume 2.)
8. "Me and Bobby McGee" (Kris Kristofferson, Fred Foster) – 6:04
9. "Cumberland Blues" (Garcia, Lesh, Hunter) – 5:34
10. "Playing in the Band" (Weir, Hart, Hunter) – 11:27

Disc 2

1. "Tennessee Jed" (Garcia, Hunter) – 7:56
2. "El Paso" (Robbins) – 4:24
3. "Big Boss Man" (Smith, Dixon) – 6:24
4. "Beat It On Down the Line" (Fuller) – 3:16
5. "Casey Jones" (Garcia, Hunter) – 5:53

(the first ~34.5 seconds of Casey Jones is a patch from a different performance)

Second set:

6. "Truckin' " (Garcia, Lesh, Weir, Hunter) – 10:55
7. "Hurts Me Too" (James, Sehorn) – 6:57
8. "Brown-Eyed Women" (Garcia, Hunter) – 4:57 (Note: Previously released on Europe '72.)
9. "Looks Like Rain" (Weir, Barlow) – 7:06

Disc 3

1. "Dark Star" (Garcia, Hart, Kreutzmann, Lesh, McKernan, Weir, Hunter) > – 29:25
2. "Sugar Magnolia" (Weir, Hunter) > – 6:41
3. "Good Lovin' " (Clark, Resnick) > – 18:27
4. "Caution (Do Not Stop on Tracks)" (Grateful Dead) > – 6:44
5. "Good Lovin' " (Clark, Resnick) – 3:00 (Note: Previously released on Europe '72 (bonus track).)

Disc 4

1. "Ramble On Rose" (Garcia, Hunter) – 6:25
2. "Not Fade Away" (Petty, Hardin) > – 5:39
3. "Goin' Down the Road Feeling Bad" (traditional, arranged by Grateful Dead) > – 6:55
4. "Not Fade Away" (Petty, Hardin) – 3:25

Encore:

5. "One More Saturday Night" (Weir) – 4:44

=== Europe '72, Vol. 5: Stakladen, Aarhus University, Aarhus, Denmark (4/16/1972) ===
Album released October 3, 2011
Length 169:47 (2:49:47) (Note: Donna Jean was absent from this show for unknown reasons.)

Disc 1

First set:

1. "Greatest Story Ever Told" (Weir, Hart, Hunter) – 5:53
2. "Sugaree" (Garcia, Hunter) – 7:04
3. "Chinatown Shuffle" (McKernan) – 3:11
4. "Black-Throated Wind" (Weir, Barlow) – 6:40
5. "Tennessee Jed" (Garcia, Hunter) – 7:39
6. "Mr. Charlie" (McKernan, Hunter) – 4:12
7. "Beat It On Down the Line" (Fuller) – 3:12
8. "China Cat Sunflower" (Garcia, Hunter) > – 6:37
9. "I Know You Rider" (traditional, arranged by Grateful Dead) – 5:41
10. "Mexicali Blues" (Weir, Barlow) – 3:55
11. "Loser" (Garcia, Hunter) – 6:34
12. "Next Time You See Me" (Harvey, Forest) – 4:23

Disc 2

1. "Playing in the Band" (Weir, Hart, Hunter) – 11:33
2. "Dire Wolf" (Garcia, Hunter) – 4:11

Second set:

3. "Good Lovin' " (Clark, Resnick) – 20:08
4. "Cumberland Blues" (Garcia, Lesh, Hunter) – 6:28
5. "El Paso" (Robbins) – 4:48
6. "Deal" (Garcia, Hunter) – 4:54

Disc 3

1. "Truckin' " (Garcia, Lesh, Weir, Hunter) > – 11:37
2. "Jam" (Grateful Dead) > – 16:32
3. "The Other One" (Weir, Kreutzmann) > – 3:32
4. "Me and My Uncle" (Phillips) > – 3:01
5. "The Other One" (Weir, Kreutzmann) > – 2:38
6. "Not Fade Away" (Petty, Hardin) > – 5:56
7. "Goin' Down the Road Feeling Bad" (traditional, arranged by Grateful Dead) > – 6:32
8. "Not Fade Away" (Petty, Hardin) – 3:06

=== Europe '72, Vol. 6: Tivoli Concert Hall, Copenhagen, Denmark (4/17/1972) ===
Album released October 3, 2011
Length 183:28 (3:03:28)

Disc 1

First set:

1. "Cold Rain and Snow" (traditional, arranged by Grateful Dead) – 6:28
2. "Me and Bobby McGee" (Kristofferson, Foster) – 6:19 (Note: Song recorded by Danish television for subsequent broadcast as "TV from the Tivoli" in three parts on 4/17/72, 8/12/72, and 8/25/72.)
3. "Chinatown Shuffle" (McKernan) – 2:55
4. "China Cat Sunflower" (Garcia, Hunter) > – 6:04
5. "I Know You Rider" (traditional, arranged by Grateful Dead) – 6:29
6. "Jack Straw" (Weir, Hunter) – 3:57
7. "He's Gone" (Garcia, Hunter) – 7:02
8. "Next Time You See Me" (Harvey, Forest) – 5:11
9. "Black-Throated Wind" (Weir, Barlow) – 6:48

Second set:

10. "Casey Jones" (Garcia, Hunter) – 5:42
11. "Mr. Charlie" (McKernan, Hunter) – 3:48

Disc 2

1. "Playing in the Band" (Weir, Hart, Hunter) – 9:58
2. "Sugaree" (Garcia, Hunter) – 6:59
3. "One More Saturday Night" (Weir) – 4:44 (Note: No encore this show. "One More Saturday Night", usually played as an encore during this tour, was played in the second set and was the intended final song for the TV broadcast, which explains Weir's "Bye, bye" comment at the end of the song.)
4. "Hurts Me Too" (James, Sehorn) – 7:13
5. "Ramble on Rose" (Garcia, Hunter) – 7:12
6. "El Paso" (Robbins) – 5:17
7. "Big Railroad Blues" (Lewis, arranged by Grateful Dead) – 3:38 (Note: Also released on Europe '72 Volume 2 (vinyl record version of the album only).)
8. "Truckin' " (Garcia, Lesh, Weir, Hunter) – 11:08

Disc 3

Third set:

1. "Dark Star" (Garcia, Hart, Kreutzmann, Lesh, McKernan, Weir, Hunter) > – 30:59
2. "Sugar Magnolia" (Weir, Hunter) > – 6:55
3. "Caution (Do Not Stop on Tracks)" (Grateful Dead) > – 23:39
4. "Johnny B. Goode" (Chuck Berry) – 4:18

=== Europe '72, Vol. 7: Beat Club, Bremen, West Germany (4/21/1972) ===
Album released November 1, 2011 (Note: The soundcheck for this show included "Loser" and "Black-Throated Wind", which were not included in this release.)
Length 79:22 (1:19:22) (Note: The band's relatively brief performance on April 21 was for the German TV show Beat-Club, and is contained on one CD.)

1. "Bertha" (Garcia, Hunter) – 6:06
2. "Playing in the Band" (Weir, Hart, Hunter) – 9:58
3. "Mr. Charlie" (McKernan, Hunter) – 4:05
4. "Sugaree" (Garcia, Hunter) – 7:53
5. "One More Saturday Night" (Weir) – 4:51
6. "Playing in the Band" (Weir, Hart, Hunter) – 10:56
7. "Beat It On Down the Line" (Fuller) – 3:03
8. "Truckin' " (Garcia, Lesh, Weir, Hunter) > – 9:33
9. "Drums" (Kreutzmann) > – 1:16
10. "The Other One" (Weir, Kreutzmann) – 21:47

=== Europe '72, Vol. 8: Rheinhalle, Düsseldorf, West Germany (4/24/1972) ===
Album released November 1, 2011 (Note: All tracks from this concert were previously released as Rockin' the Rhein with the Grateful Dead, with a different running order to facilitate three CDs.)
Length 204:40 (3:24:40)

Disc 1

First set:

1. "Truckin' " (Garcia, Lesh, Weir, Hunter) – 11:17
2. "Tennessee Jed" (Garcia, Hunter) – 8:01
3. "Chinatown Shuffle" (McKernan) – 3:10
4. "Black-Throated Wind" (Weir, Barlow) – 6:59
5. "China Cat Sunflower" (Garcia, Hunter) > – 6:07
6. "I Know You Rider" (traditional, arranged by Grateful Dead) – 6:19
7. "Mr. Charlie" (McKernan, Hunter) – 4:12
8. "Beat It On Down the Line" (Fuller) – 3:30
9. "Loser" (Garcia, Hunter) – 6:39

Disc 2

1. "Playing in the Band" (Weir, Hart, Hunter) – 11:40
2. "Next Time You See Me" (Harvey, Forest) – 4:41
3. "Me and Bobby McGee" (Kristofferson, Foster) – 6:20 (Note: Previously released on Weir Here.)
4. "Good Lovin' " (Clark, Resnick) – 17:30
5. "Casey Jones" (Garcia, Hunter) – 6:12

Disc 3

Second set:

1. "Dark Star" (Garcia, Hart, Kreutzmann, Lesh, McKernan, Weir, Hunter) > – 25:45
2. "Me and My Uncle" (Phillips) > – 3:23
3. "Dark Star" (Garcia, Hart, Kreutzmann, Lesh, McKernan, Weir, Hunter) > – 14:38
4. "Wharf Rat" (Garcia, Hunter) > – 9:16
5. "Sugar Magnolia" (Weir, Hunter) – 7:47

Disc 4

Third set:

1. "He's Gone" (Garcia, Hunter) – 10:33
2. "Hurts Me Too" (James, Sehorn) – 8:34
3. "El Paso" (Robbins) – 4:47
4. "Not Fade Away" (Petty, Hardin) > – 3:19
5. "Goin' Down the Road Feeling Bad" (traditional, arranged by Grateful Dead) > – 6:30
6. "Not Fade Away" (Petty, Hardin) – 3:01

Encore:

7. "One More Saturday Night" (Weir) – 4:44

=== Europe '72, Vol. 9: Jahrhunderthalle, Frankfurt, West Germany (4/26/1972) ===
Album released November 1, 2011
Length 230:49 (3:50:49)

Disc 1

First set:

1. "Bertha" (Garcia, Hunter) – 6:05 (Note: Previously released on Hundred Year Hall.)
2. "Me and My Uncle" (Phillips) – 3:34
3. "Mr. Charlie" (McKernan, Hunter) – 4:35
4. "He's Gone" (Garcia, Hunter) – 8:19
5. "Black-Throated Wind" (Weir, Barlow) – 6:40
6. "Next Time You See Me" (Harvey, Forest) – 4:25
7. "China Cat Sunflower" (Garcia, Hunter) > – 5:25
8. "I Know You Rider" (traditional, arranged by Grateful Dead) – 5:12
9. "Jack Straw" (Weir, Hunter) – 4:52
10. "Big Railroad Blues" (Lewis, arranged by Grateful Dead) – 4:46
11. "Playing in the Band" (Weir, Hart, Hunter) – 9:23

Disc 2

1. "Chinatown Shuffle" (McKernan) – 2:58
2. "Loser" (Garcia, Hunter) – 6:43
3. "Beat It On Down the Line" (Fuller) – 3:44
4. "You Win Again" (Williams) – 4:34
5. "El Paso" (Robbins) – 4:36
6. "Tennessee Jed" (Garcia, Hunter) – 7:47
7. "Greatest Story Ever Told" (Weir, Hart, Hunter) – 5:43
8. "The Stranger (Two Souls in Communion)" (McKernan) – 6:57 (Note: Previously released on Europe '72 (bonus track).)
9. "Casey Jones" (Garcia, Hunter) – 5:50

Second set:

10. "Good Lovin'" (Clark, Resnick) – 14:08 (Note: Also released on Europe '72 Volume 2.)
11. "Dire Wolf" (Garcia, Hunter) – 4:20

Disc 3

1. "Truckin' " (Garcia, Lesh, Weir, Hunter) > – 14:10
2. "Drums" (Kreutzmann) > – 4:07
3. "The Other One" (Weir, Kreutzmann) > – 36:27
4. "Comes a Time" (Garcia, Hunter) > – 6:41
5. "Sugar Magnolia" (Weir, Hunter) – 7:13

Disc 4

1. "Turn On Your Lovelight" (Joseph Scott, Deadric Malone) > – 17:06
2. "Goin' Down the Road Feeling Bad" (traditional, arranged by Grateful Dead) > – 9:40
3. "One More Saturday Night" (Weir) – 5:04 (Note: No encore this show.)

=== Europe '72, Vol. 10: Musikhalle, Hamburg, West Germany (4/29/1972) ===
Album released November 1, 2011
Length 176:42 (2:56:42)

Disc 1

First set:

1. "Playing in the Band" (Weir, Hart, Hunter) – 9:43
2. "Sugaree" (Garcia, Hunter) – 7:15
3. "Mr. Charlie" (McKernan, Hunter) – 4:14
4. "Black-Throated Wind" (Weir, Barlow) – 5:57
5. "China Cat Sunflower" (Garcia, Hunter) > – 5:24
6. "I Know You Rider" (traditional, arranged by Grateful Dead) – 5:35
7. "Big Boss Man" (Smith, Dixon) – 5:24
8. "Jack Straw" (Weir, Hunter) – 4:58
9. "Loser" (Garcia, Hunter) – 6:49
10. "Chinatown Shuffle" (McKernan) – 2:46

Disc 2

1. "Me and My Uncle" (Phillips) – 3:07
2. "Big Railroad Blues" (Lewis, arranged by Grateful Dead) – 3:47
3. "Good Lovin' " (Clark, Resnick) – 16:27
4. "Casey Jones" (Garcia, Hunter) – 6:04

Second set:

5. "Greatest Story Ever Told" (Weir, Hart, Hunter) – 6:15
6. "He's Gone" (Garcia, Hunter) – 7:58
7. "Next Time You See Me" (Harvey, Forest) – 5:31

Disc 3

1. "Dark Star" (Garcia, Hart, Kreutzmann, Lesh, McKernan, Weir, Hunter) > – 30:11
2. "Sugar Magnolia" (Weir, Hunter) > – 6:28
3. "Caution (Do Not Stop on Tracks)" (Grateful Dead) – 21:15

Encore:

4. "One More Saturday Night" (Weir) – 5:06
5. "Uncle John's Band" (Garcia, Hunter) – 6:39

=== Europe '72, Vol. 11: Olympia Theatre, Paris, France (5/3/1972) ===
Album released November 1, 2011
Length 220:40 (3:40:40)

Disc 1

First set:

1. "Bertha" (Garcia, Hunter) – 6:48
2. "Me and My Uncle" (Phillips) – 3:19
3. "Mr. Charlie" (McKernan, Hunter) – 3:45
4. "Sugaree" (Garcia, Hunter) – 7:12 (Note: Also released on Europe '72 Volume 2.)
5. "Black-Throated Wind" (Weir, Barlow) – 6:03
6. "Chinatown Shuffle" (McKernan) – 3:02
7. "China Cat Sunflower" (Garcia, Hunter) > – 5:36 (Note: Previously released on Europe '72.)
8. "I Know You Rider" (traditional, arranged by Grateful Dead) – 5:34
9. "Beat It On Down the Line" (Fuller) – 3:30
10. "He's Gone" (Garcia, Hunter) – 8:25
11. "Next Time You See Me" (Harvey, Forest) – 4:50
12. "Playing in the Band" (Weir, Hart, Hunter) – 11:01

Disc 2

1. "Tennessee Jed" (Garcia, Hunter) – 7:32
2. "Good Lovin' " (Clark, Resnick) – 16:53
3. "Sing Me Back Home" (Merle Haggard) – 9:19
4. "Casey Jones" (Garcia, Hunter) – 6:15

Second set:

5. "Greatest Story Ever Told" (Weir, Hart, Hunter) – 5:27
6. "Ramble On Rose" (Garcia, Hunter) – 6:19
7. "Hurts Me Too" (James, Sehorn) – 6:34

Disc 3

1. "Truckin' " (Garcia, Lesh, Weir, Hunter) > – 9:33
2. "The Other One" (Weir, Kreutzmann) > – 18:29
3. "Drums" (Kreutzmann) > – 3:19
4. "The Other One" (Weir, Kreutzmann) > – 12:52
5. "Me and Bobby McGee" (Kristofferson, Foster) > – 5:30
6. "The Other One" (Weir, Kreutzmann) > – 2:46
7. "Wharf Rat" (Garcia, Hunter) – 9:34

Disc 4

1. "Jack Straw" (Weir, Hunter) – 5:23
2. "Sugar Magnolia" (Weir, Hunter) > – 6:21
3. "Not Fade Away" (Petty, Hardin) > – 4:46
4. "Goin' Down the Road Feeling Bad" (traditional, arranged by Grateful Dead) > – 7:04
5. "Not Fade Away" (Petty, Hardin) – 2:44

Encore:

6. "One More Saturday Night" (Weir) – 5:18

=== Europe '72, Vol. 12: Olympia Theatre, Paris, France (5/4/1972) ===
Album released November 1, 2011
Length 213:35 (3:33:35)

Disc 1

First set:

1. "Greatest Story Ever Told" (Weir, Hart, Hunter) – 5:56
2. "Deal" (Garcia, Hunter) – 5:17
3. "Mr. Charlie" (McKernan, Hunter) – 4:10
4. "Beat It On Down the Line" (Fuller) – 3:33
5. "Brown-Eyed Women" (Garcia, Hunter) – 5:24
6. "Chinatown Shuffle" (McKernan) – 3:30
7. "Playing in the Band" (Weir, Hart, Hunter) – 10:34
8. "You Win Again" (Williams) – 4:14
9. "Hurts Me Too" (James, Sehorn) – 7:24
10. "He's Gone" (Garcia, Hunter) – 8:21
11. "El Paso" (Robbins) – 4:51

Disc 2

1. "Big Railroad Blues" (Lewis, arranged by Grateful Dead) – 4:06
2. "The Stranger (Two Souls in Communion)" (McKernan) – 7:00
3. "Casey Jones" (Garcia, Hunter) – 6:22

Second set:

4. "Good Lovin' " (Clark, Resnick) – 23:18
5. "Next Time You See Me" (Harvey, Forest) – 6:20 (Note: Also released on Europe '72 Volume 2.)
6. "Ramble On Rose" (Garcia, Hunter) – 6:57
7. "Jack Straw" (Weir, Hunter) – 4:57

Disc 3

1. "Dark Star" (Garcia, Hart, Kreutzmann, Lesh, McKernan, Weir, Hunter) > – 19:21 (Note: The "Dark Star" portion (including the drum solo) later released as a stand-alone, vinyl-only edition.)
2. "Drums" (Kreutzmann) > – 2:32
3. "Dark Star" (Garcia, Hart, Kreutzmann, Lesh, McKernan, Weir, Hunter) > – 17:34
4. "Sugar Magnolia" (Weir, Hunter) – 7:41 (Note: Previously released on Europe '72.)
5. "Sing Me Back Home" (Haggard) – 11:37

Disc 4

1. "Mexicali Blues" (Weir, Barlow) – 4:01
2. "Big Boss Man" (Smith, Dixon) – 6:39
3. "Uncle John's Band" (Garcia, Hunter) – 7:16
4. "Goin' Down the Road Feeling Bad" (traditional, arranged by Grateful Dead) > – 7:15
5. "Not Fade Away" (Petty, Hardin) – 2:57

Encore:

6. "One More Saturday Night" (Weir) – 4:45

=== Europe '72, Vol. 13: Bickershaw Festival, Wigan, England (5/7/1972) ===
Album released November 29, 2011
Length 238:30 (3:58:30)

Disc 1

First set:

1. "Truckin'" (Garcia, Lesh, Weir, Hunter) – 10:57
2. "Sugaree" (Garcia, Hunter) – 7:29
3. "Mr. Charlie" (McKernan, Hunter) – 4:16 (Note: Previously released on Steppin' Out with the Grateful Dead: England '72.)
4. "Beat It On Down the Line" (Fuller) – 4:03
5. "He's Gone" (Garcia, Hunter) – 7:39
6. "Chinatown Shuffle" (McKernan) – 3:22
7. "China Cat Sunflower" (Garcia, Hunter) > – 5:57
8. "I Know You Rider" (traditional, arranged by Grateful Dead) – 5:57
9. "Black-Throated Wind" (Weir, Barlow) – 5:59
10. "Next Time You See Me" (Harvey, Forest) – 4:53

"Happy Birthday to You" (Patty Hill, Mildred Hill) – 1:01 (Note: Played in celebration of Bill Kreutzmann's 26th birthday.)

Disc 2

1. "Playing in the Band" (Weir, Hart, Hunter) – 11:36
2. "Tennessee Jed" (Garcia, Hunter) – 7:43
3. "Good Lovin'" (Clark, Resnick) – 20:01
4. "Casey Jones" (Garcia, Hunter) – 6:43

Second set:

5. "Greatest Story Ever Told" (Weir, Hart, Hunter) – 7:50
6. "Big Boss Man" (Smith, Dixon) – 6:26
7. "Ramble On Rose" (Garcia, Hunter) – 6:59
8. "Jack Straw" (Weir, Hunter) – 4:59

Disc 3

1. "Dark Star" (Garcia, Hart, Kreutzmann, Lesh, McKernan, Weir, Hunter) > – 19:49 (Note: Also released on Europe '72 Volume 2.)
2. "Drums" (Kreutzmann) > – 2:24
3. "The Other One" (Weir, Kreutzmann) > – 30:34
4. "Sing Me Back Home" (Haggard) – 11:27

Disc 4

1. "Sugar Magnolia" (Weir, Hunter) > – 9:22
2. "Turn On Your Lovelight" (Scott, Malone) > – 13:02
3. "Goin' Down the Road Feeling Bad" (traditional, arranged by Grateful Dead) > – 8:55
4. "Not Fade Away" (Petty, Hardin) – 4:21

Encore:

5. "One More Saturday Night" (Weir) – 5:03

=== Europe '72, Vol. 14: Concertgebouw, Amsterdam, Holland (5/10/1972) ===
Album released November 29, 2011
Length 215:54 (3:35:54)

Disc 1

First set:

1. "Bertha" (Garcia, Hunter) – 5:50
2. "Me and My Uncle" (Phillips) – 3:17
3. "Mr. Charlie" (McKernan, Hunter) – 3:40
4. "China Cat Sunflower" (Garcia, Hunter) > – 4:44
5. "I Know You Rider" (traditional, arranged by Grateful Dead) – 5:16
6. "Black-Throated Wind" (Weir, Barlow) – 5:49
7. "Loser" (Garcia, Hunter) – 6:46
8. "Next Time You See Me" (Harvey, Forest) – 5:16
9. "El Paso" (Robbins) – 4:57
10. "He's Gone" (Garcia, Hunter) – 7:33 (Note: Previously released on Europe '72.)
11. "Chinatown Shuffle" (McKernan) – 2:52

Disc 2

1. "Playing in the Band" (Weir, Hart, Hunter) – 13:50
2. "Big Railroad Blues" (Lewis, arranged by Grateful Dead) – 3:55
3. "Jack Straw" (Weir, Hunter) – 4:53
4. "Tennessee Jed" (Garcia, Hunter) – 7:31
5. "Big Boss Man" (Smith, Dixon) – 4:21
6. "Greatest Story Ever Told" (Weir, Hart, Hunter) – 5:20
7. "Casey Jones" (Garcia, Hunter) – 5:52

Disc 3

Second set:

1. "Truckin' " (Garcia, Lesh, Weir, Hunter) > – 8:50
2. "Drums" (Kreutzmann) > – 2:24
3. "The Other One" (Weir, Kreutzmann) > – 34:21
4. "Me and Bobby McGee" (Kristofferson, Foster) > – 5:34
5. "The Other One" (Weir, Kreutzmann) > – 2:04
6. "Wharf Rat" (Garcia, Hunter) – 8:54

Disc 4

1. "Beat It On Down the Line" (Fuller) – 3:38
2. "The Stranger (Two Souls in Communion)" (McKernan) – 6:59
3. "Ramble On Rose" (Garcia, Hunter) – 6:48
4. "Sing Me Back Home" (Haggard) – 10:00
5. "Sugar Magnolia" (Weir, Hunter) > – 7:02
6. "Not Fade Away" (Petty, Hardin) > – 4:47
7. "Goin' Down the Road Feeling Bad" (traditional, arranged by Grateful Dead) > – 8:52
8. "Not Fade Away" (Petty, Hardin) – 4:12 (Note: No encore this show.)

=== Europe '72, Vol. 15: Grote Zaal, De Doelen, Rotterdam, Holland (5/11/1972) ===
Album released November 29, 2011
Length 223:59 (3:43:59)

Disc 1

First set:

1. "Playing in the Band" (Weir, Hart, Hunter) – 10:52
2. "Sugaree" (Garcia, Hunter) – 7:23
3. "Mr. Charlie" (McKernan, Hunter) – 3:51
4. "Black-Throated Wind" (Weir, Barlow) – 6:21
5. "Deal" (Garcia, Hunter) – 5:04
6. "Chinatown Shuffle" (McKernan) – 3:10 (Note: Also released on So Many Roads (1965–1995).)
7. "Mexicali Blues" (Weir, Barlow) – 3:40
8. "China Cat Sunflower" (Garcia, Hunter) > – 5:04
9. "I Know You Rider" (traditional, arranged by Grateful Dead) – 6:05
10. "Hurts Me Too" (James, Sehorn) – 6:22
11. "Beat It On Down the Line" (Fuller) – 3:26
12. "Brown-Eyed Women" (Garcia, Hunter) – 5:05

Disc 2

1. "Jack Straw" (Weir, Hunter) – 4:55
2. "Big Railroad Blues" (Lewis, arranged by Grateful Dead) – 4:18
3. "Good Lovin' " (Clark, Resnick) – 12:35
4. "Casey Jones" (Garcia, Hunter) – 6:19

Second set:

5. "Morning Dew" (Bonnie Dobson, Tim Rose) – 12:38
6. "Me and My Uncle" (Phillips) – 3:11
7. "The Stranger (Two Souls in Communion)" (McKernan) – 7:33
8. "El Paso" (Robbins) – 4:52
9. "Tennessee Jed" (Garcia, Hunter) – 8:17
10. "Next Time You See Me" (Harvey, Forest) – 4:42

Disc 3

1. "Dark Star" (Garcia, Hart, Kreutzmann, Lesh, McKernan, Weir, Hunter) > – 13:46
2. "Drums" (Kreutzmann) > – 3:48
3. "Dark Star" (Garcia, Hart, Kreutzmann, Lesh, McKernan, Weir, Hunter) > – 30:33

Disc 4

1. "Sugar Magnolia" (Weir, Hunter) > – 7:43
2. "Caution (Do Not Stop on Tracks)" (Grateful Dead) > – 16:34
3. "Truckin' " (Garcia, Lesh, Weir, Hunter) – 9:18
4. "Uncle John's Band" (Garcia, Hunter) – 6:47 (Note: Encore performance of "One More Saturday Night" is missing.)

=== Europe '72, Vol. 16: Lille Fairgrounds, Lille, France (5/13/1972) ===
Album released November 29, 2011
Length 172:24 (2:52:24)

Disc 1

First set:

1. "Tuning Rap" – 3:28
2. "Bertha" (Garcia, Hunter) – 5:43
3. "Black-Throated Wind" (Weir, Barlow) – 6:12
4. "Chinatown Shuffle" (McKernan) – 2:47
5. "Loser" (Garcia, Hunter) – 6:52
6. "Beat It On Down the Line" (Fuller) – 3:28
7. "Mr. Charlie" (McKernan, Hunter) – 4:07
8. "China Cat Sunflower" (Garcia, Hunter) > – 5:00
9. "I Know You Rider" (traditional, arranged by Grateful Dead) – 6:51
10. "Me and My Uncle" (Phillips) – 3:06
11. "Big Railroad Blues" (Lewis, arranged by Grateful Dead) – 3:42
12. "Next Time You See Me" (Harvey, Forest) – 5:02
13. "Playing in the Band" (Weir, Hart, Hunter) – 12:39

Disc 2

1. "Sugaree" (Garcia, Hunter) – 7:02
2. "Mexicali Blues" (Weir, Barlow) – 3:34
3. "Casey Jones" (Garcia, Hunter) – 6:21

Second set:

4. "Truckin' " (Garcia, Lesh, Weir, Hunter) > – 11:00
5. "Drums" (Kreutzmann) > – 2:28
6. "The Other One" (Weir, Kreutzmann) > – 28:41
7. "He's Gone" (Garcia, Hunter) – 8:07

Disc 3

1. "Hurts Me Too" (James, Sehorn) – 8:20
2. "Sugar Magnolia" (Weir, Hunter) > – 6:43
3. "Not Fade Away" (Petty, Hardin) > – 4:33
4. "Goin' Down the Road Feeling Bad" (traditional, arranged by Grateful Dead) > – 7:53
5. "Not Fade Away" (Petty, Hardin) – 3:10

Encore:

6. "One More Saturday Night" (Weir) – 5:24

=== Europe '72, Vol. 17: La Grande Salle Du Grand Theatre, Luxembourg (5/16/1972) ===
Album released November 29, 2011
Length 154:18 (2:34:24) (Note: Performed in the studio hall for live broadcast on Radio Luxembourg, in front of a small audience)

Disc 1

Sound check:

1. "Big River" (Johnny Cash) – 6:16
2. "Sugar Magnolia" (Weir, Hunter) – 3:13

First set:

3. "Bertha" (Garcia, Hunter) – 6:54
4. "Me and My Uncle" (Phillips) – 3:28
5. "Mr. Charlie" (McKernan, Hunter) – 3:45
6. "Sugaree" (Garcia, Hunter) – 7:03
7. "Black-Throated Wind" (Weir, Barlow) – 5:53
8. "Chinatown Shuffle" (McKernan) – 2:54
9. "China Cat Sunflower" (Garcia, Hunter) > – 5:47
10. "I Know You Rider" (traditional, arranged by Grateful Dead) – 5:55
11. "Beat It On Down the Line" (Fuller) – 3:18
12. "It Hurts Me Too" (James, Sehorn) – 6:41
13. "Tennessee Jed" (Garcia, Hunter) – 7:18
14. "Playing in the Band" (Weir, Hart, Hunter) – 11:15

Disc 2

1. "Promised Land" (Berry) – 3:19

Second set:

2. "Truckin' " (Garcia, Lesh, Weir, Hunter) > – 12:06
3. "Drums" (Kreutzmann) > – 2:27
4. "The Other One" (Weir, Kreutzmann) – 19:36
5. "Sing Me Back Home" (Haggard) – 10:42
6. "Sugar Magnolia" (Weir, Hunter) – 6:49
7. "Not Fade Away" (Petty, Hardin) > – 3:56
8. "Goin' Down the Road Feeling Bad" (traditional, arranged by Grateful Dead) > – 7:21
9. "Not Fade Away" (Petty, Hardin) – 3:23

Encore:

10. "One More Saturday Night" (Weir) – 5:16

=== Europe '72, Vol. 18: Kongressaal, Munich, West Germany (5/18/1972) ===
Album released November 29, 2011
Length 186:30 (3:06:30)

Disc 1

First set:

1. "Truckin' " (Garcia, Lesh, Weir, Hunter) – 10:34
2. "Sugaree" (Garcia, Hunter) – 7:19
3. "Mr. Charlie" (McKernan, Hunter) – 4:01
4. "Jack Straw" (Weir, Hunter) – 4:51
5. "Tennessee Jed" (Garcia, Hunter) – 7:46
6. "Chinatown Shuffle" (McKernan) – 3:16
7. "Black-Throated Wind" (Weir, Barlow) – 6:57
8. "China Cat Sunflower" (Garcia, Hunter) > – 5:29
9. "I Know You Rider" (traditional, arranged by Grateful Dead) – 6:54
10. "El Paso" (Robbins) – 4:43

Disc 2

1. "Hurts Me Too" (James, Sehorn) – 8:19
2. "You Win Again" (Williams) – 4:55
3. "Playing in the Band" (Weir, Hart, Hunter) – 10:59
4. "Good Lovin' " (Clark, Resnick) – 12:37
5. "Casey Jones" (Garcia, Hunter) – 6:52

Second set:

6. "Sitting on Top of the World" (Lonnie Carter, Walter Jacobs) – 3:33
7. "Me and My Uncle" (Phillips) – 3:14
8. "Ramble on Rose" (Garcia, Hunter) – 6:44
9. "Beat It On Down the Line" (Fuller) – 2:48

Disc 3

1. "Dark Star" (Garcia, Hart, Kreutzmann, Lesh, McKernan, Weir, Hunter) > – 28:20
2. "Morning Dew" (Dobson, Rose) – 11:45
3. "Drums" (Kreutzmann) > – 1:08
4. "Sugar Magnolia" (Weir, Hunter) – 7:04

Encore:

5. "Sing Me Back Home" (Haggard) – 11:35
6. "One More Saturday Night" (Weir) – 5:00

=== Europe '72, Vol. 19: Lyceum Theatre, London, England (5/23/1972) ===
Album released December 13, 2011
Length 209:41 (3:29:41)

Disc 1

First set:

1. "Promised Land" (Berry) – 3:20
2. "Sugaree" (Garcia, Hunter) – 7:15
3. "Mr. Charlie" (McKernan, Hunter) – 3:49
4. "Black-Throated Wind" (Weir, Barlow) – 5:43
5. "Tennessee Jed" (Garcia, Hunter) – 7:33
6. "Next Time You See Me" (Harvey, Forest) – 4:54
7. "Jack Straw" (Weir, Hunter) – 4:53
8. "China Cat Sunflower" (Garcia, Hunter) > – 5:05 (Note: Previously released on Steppin' Out with the Grateful Dead: England '72.)
9. "I Know You Rider" (traditional, arranged by Grateful Dead) – 6:13
10. "Me and My Uncle" (Phillips) – 3:22
11. "Chinatown Shuffle" (McKernan) – 2:57
12. "Big Railroad Blues" (Lewis, arranged by Grateful Dead) – 4:00
13. "The Stranger (Two Souls in Communion)" (McKernan) – 7:57
14. "Playing in the Band" (Weir, Hart, Hunter) – 12:38

Disc 2

1. "Sitting on Top of the World" (Carter, Jacobs) – 3:20
2. "Rockin' Pneumonia and the Boogie Woogie Flu" (Huey "Piano" Smith) – 5:12
3. "Mexicali Blues" (Weir, Barlow) – 3:30
4. "Good Lovin' " (Clark, Resnick) – 11:48
5. "Casey Jones" (Garcia, Hunter) – 6:45

Second set:

6. "Ramble on Rose" (Garcia, Hunter) – 7:21
7. "Dark Star" (Garcia, Hart, Kreutzmann, Lesh, McKernan, Weir, Hunter) > – 29:54
8. "Morning Dew" (Dobson, Rose) – 11:36

Disc 3

1. "He's Gone" (Garcia, Hunter) – 8:52
2. "Sugar Magnolia" (Weir, Hunter) – 6:59
3. "Comes a Time" (Garcia, Hunter) – 6:44
4. "Goin' Down the Road Feeling Bad" (traditional, arranged by Grateful Dead) > – 8:52
5. "Not Fade Away" (Petty, Hardin) > – 4:53
6. "Hey Bo Diddley" (Bo Diddley) > – 4:30
7. "Not Fade Away" (Petty, Hardin) – 3:06

Encore:

8. "Uncle John's Band" (Garcia, Hunter) – 6:54

=== Europe '72, Vol. 20: Lyceum Theatre, London, England (5/24/1972) ===
Album released December 13, 2011
Length 188:46 (3:08:46)

Disc 1

First set:

1. "Cold Rain and Snow" (traditional, arranged by Grateful Dead) – 5:43 (Note: Previously released on Steppin' Out with the Grateful Dead: England '72.)
2. "Beat It On Down the Line" (Fuller) – 3:34
3. "Mr. Charlie" (McKernan, Hunter) – 4:03
4. "Deal" (Garcia, Hunter) – 4:35
5. "Me and My Uncle" (Phillips) – 3:13
6. "Hurts Me Too" (James, Sehorn) – 7:43 (Note: Previously released on Europe '72.)
7. "Dire Wolf" (Garcia, Hunter) – 4:20
8. "Black-Throated Wind" (Weir, Barlow) – 6:37
9. "Chinatown Shuffle" (McKernan) – 2:57
10. "China Cat Sunflower" (Garcia, Hunter) > – 5:50
11. "I Know You Rider" (traditional, arranged by Grateful Dead) – 6:34
12. "Playing in the Band" (Weir, Hart, Hunter) – 12:15 (Note: Also released on Europe '72 Volume 2.)
13. "You Win Again" (Williams) – 4:14
14. "Jack Straw" (Weir, Hunter) – 4:56

Disc 2

1. "Casey Jones" (Garcia, Hunter) – 6:16

Second set:

2. "Rockin' Pneumonia and the Boogie Woogie Flu" (Smith) – 5:27
3. "Mexicali Blues" (Weir, Barlow) – 3:36
4. "Black Peter" (Garcia, Hunter) – 10:07
5. "Truckin' " (Garcia, Lesh, Weir, Hunter) > – 11:53
6. "Drums" (Kreutzmann) > – 1:50
7. "The Other One" (Weir, Kreutzmann) > – 29:45
8. "Sing Me Back Home" (Haggard) – 10:30

Disc 3

1. "Sugar Magnolia" (Weir, Hunter) > – 7:11
2. "Turn On Your Lovelight" (Scott, Malone) > – 12:02
3. "The Stranger (Two Souls in Communion)" (McKernan) – 8:36

Encore:

4. "One More Saturday Night" (Weir) – 5:10

=== Europe '72, Vol. 21: Lyceum Theatre, London, England (5/25/1972) ===
Album released December 13, 2011
Length 205:52 (3:25:52)

Disc 1

First set:

1. "Promised Land" (Berry) – 3:22
2. "Brown-Eyed Women" (Garcia, Hunter) – 3:55
3. "Big Boss Man" (Smith, Dixon) – 6:15
4. "Black-Throated Wind" (Weir, Barlow) – 6:07
5. "Tennessee Jed" (Garcia, Hunter) – 7:37
6. "Mr. Charlie" (McKernan, Hunter) – 4:07
7. "Jack Straw" (Weir, Hunter) – 5:01
8. "China Cat Sunflower" (Garcia, Hunter) > – 4:30
9. "I Know You Rider" (traditional, arranged by Grateful Dead) – 5:45
10. "Me and Bobby McGee" (Kristofferson, Foster) – 5:49

Disc 2

1. "Good Lovin' " (Clark, Resnick) – 15:29
2. "Playing in the Band" (Weir, Hart, Hunter) – 15:49
3. "Brokedown Palace" (Garcia, Hunter) – 6:37
4. "Casey Jones" (Garcia, Hunter) – 6:58

Second set:

5. "Me and My Uncle" (Phillips) – 3:38
6. "Big Railroad Blues" (Lewis, arranged by Grateful Dead) – 3:44
7. "Chinatown Shuffle" (McKernan) – 2:46
8. "Ramble on Rose" (Garcia, Hunter) – 6:33

Disc 3

1. "Uncle John's Band" (Garcia, Hunter) > – 9:50
2. "Wharf Rat" (Garcia, Hunter) > – 8:44
3. "Dark Star" (Garcia, Hart, Kreutzmann, Lesh, McKernan, Weir, Hunter) > – 34:36
4. "Sugar Magnolia" (Weir, Hunter) – 7:29

Disc 4

1. "Comes a Time" (Garcia, Hunter) – 7:40
2. "El Paso" (Robbins) – 4:52
3. "Sitting on Top of the World" (Carter, Jacobs) – 3:53
4. "Goin' Down the Road Feeling Bad" (traditional, arranged by Grateful Dead) > – 10:01
5. "One More Saturday Night" (Weir) – 5:00 (Note: No encore this show.)

=== Europe '72, Vol. 22: Lyceum Theatre, London, England (5/26/1972) ===
Album released December 13, 2011
Length 222:21 (3:42:21)

Disc 1

First set:

1. "Promised Land" (Berry) – 3:48
2. "Sugaree" (Garcia, Hunter) – 7:34
3. "Mr. Charlie" (McKernan, Hunter) – 3:55
4. "Black-Throated Wind" (Weir, Barlow) – 6:26
5. "Loser" (Garcia, Hunter) – 6:47
6. "Next Time You See Me" (Harvey, Forest) – 4:52
7. "El Paso" (Robbins) – 4:53
8. "Dire Wolf" (Garcia, Hunter) – 4:27
9. "The Stranger (Two Souls in Communion)" (McKernan) – 7:50
10. "Playing in the Band" (Weir, Hart, Hunter) – 18:01

Disc 2

1. "He's Gone" (Garcia, Hunter) – 9:09
2. "Cumberland Blues" (Garcia, Lesh, Hunter) – 5:28
3. "Jack Straw" (Weir, Hunter) – 5:18 (Note: Previously released on both Steppin' Out with the Grateful Dead: England '72 and Weir Here.)
4. "Chinatown Shuffle" (McKernan) – 2:56
5. "China Cat Sunflower" (Garcia, Hunter) > – 6:16
6. "I Know You Rider" (traditional, arranged by Grateful Dead) – 5:46
7. "Not Fade Away" (Petty, Hardin) > – 6:42
8. "Goin' Down the Road Feeling Bad" (traditional, arranged by Grateful Dead) > – 8:16
9. "Not Fade Away" (Petty, Hardin) – 2:59

Disc 3

Second set:

1. "Truckin' " (Garcia, Lesh, Weir, Hunter) > – 18:57 (Note: Previously released on Europe '72.)
2. "The Other One" (Weir, Kreutzmann) > – 9:09
3. "Drums" (Kreutzmann) > – 2:17
4. "The Other One" (Weir, Kreutzmann) > – 12:19
5. "Morning Dew" (Dobson, Rose) > – 11:47
6. "The Other One" (Weir, Kreutzmann) > – 5:47
7. "Sing Me Back Home" (Haggard) – 10:58 (Note: Also released on Europe '72 Volume 2.)

Disc 4

1. "Me and My Uncle" (Phillips) – 3:45
2. "Ramble on Rose" (Garcia, Hunter) – 6:21
3. "Sugar Magnolia" (Weir, Hunter) – 8:01
4. "Casey Jones" (Garcia, Hunter) – 6:41

Encore:

5. "One More Saturday Night" (Weir) – 5:09

== Liner notes ==
=== Europe '72, Vol. 1: Wembley Empire Pool, London, England (4/7/1972) ===
In the liner notes for the show on 4/7/1972 Gary Lambert sets the scene by writing that "the Dead were overshadowed by the pop culture story in the U.K. at the time, a fleeting craze known as 'Bolan Mania'". The author goes on to discuss the "symbiosis between the U.S. and U.K rock scenes", and quotes "the great British playwright Tom Stoppard" as saying "Everybody had a sense of that". Lambert then details how "The first shows were scheduled for April 5–8 at the 3,000-seat Rainbow Theatre," then moved to "the Commodore in King Street, Hammersmith, instead of the now closed Rainbow Theatre" and then ultimately "turned into two at the building today known as the [12,000-plus-capacity] Wembley Arena, then called Empire Pool", before closing his contribution with "To be continued on 4/8/72. . ." [elipsis in original].

=== Europe '72, Vol. 2: Wembley Empire Pool, London, England (4/8/1972) ===
In the liner notes for the show on 4/8/1972 Gary Lambert continues building on his notes for the 4/7/72 show by stating "Sam [Cutler]'s instincts proved correct: while no one expected the Dead to fill the Empire Pool, they drew more than respectably—somewhere in the neighborhood of 8,000 paying customers each night". Lambert then describes the two nights at the venue as if they were one long show, writing that "By midway through the second set on opening night ... all notions of 'British reserve' were clearly out the window" and "on Night Two in London" the Dead took "an even more fearless dive into the deep unreal". In the closing paragraph, the author revisits the topic he opened with in his previous piece, writing that "In the edition of Melody Maker immediately following the Empire Pool shows, even 'Bolan Mania' had to take a backseat: most of the front page was devoted to a huge picture of Garcia and his new customized Stratocaster, accompanied by a headline reading [in all caps] 'Dead storm Britain'."

=== Europe '72, Vol. 3: City Hall, Newcastle, England (4/11/1972) ===
In the liner notes for the show on 4/11/1972 Sam Cutler opens by describing the venue as "a dour concrete building in the midst of a grim industrial town" and stating that "the Grateful Dead were initially dismayed—it had all the warmth of a witch's teat." He goes on to say that "the band transcended the limitations of the space" and ultimately the "stunned and bemused" audience "began to relax and get into the music" which "produced many a manic grin". Rosie McGee adds to Sam's short contribution with her tale of meeting and sitting for a while with "a very nice lady", the mother of Eric Burdon of The Animals, telling of how "At one point she reached over and took my hand" and, "Knowing she couldn't be heard over the music, she mouthed the words 'They're very good, you know!' and then smiled and patted my hand."

=== Europe '72, Vol. 4: Tivoli Concert Hall, Copenhagen, Denmark (4/14/1972) ===
In the liner notes for the show on 4/14/72 Larry Rogers opens by describing "the incredibly intimate Tivoli theater" as being "on the grounds of an amusement park, which seemed about as appropriate as could be", and writes of having "seen the Dead from their earliest days, when they were only Mother McCree's Uptown Jug Stompers" in Palo Alto. He continues by writing that the show was "1,600 crazed Danes and two folks from La Honda up and shaking our butts" and adding "The folks at Tivoli that night were in awe of what they were seeing and hearing. San Francisco, long past its Summer of love, was there before them". Rogers closes his notes with the same Danish quote he opened it with: " 'Sikke en lang underligt tur det har vaeret.' What a long, strange trip it's been."

=== Europe '72, Vol. 5: Stakladen, Aarhus University, Aarhus, Denmark (4/16/1972) ===
In the liner notes for the show on 4/16/72 Aarhus University historian Palle Lykke opens by asking "Can you imagine sitting on a cafeteria tray slide for almost four hours" and then reveals that the "relatively small club-like venue" served as "the campus cafeteria" in which "the maximum audience can be no more than 700." He spends much of his piece describing the logistics of playing in the space, stating "that there was simply nowhere to put" the "45 cafeteria tables and 400 chairs in the room" and "There was no security at all" because "it was not necessary at that time." Lykke closes his notes by tracing the venue's name to "the Danish noun 'staklade', which means "barn (Danish: 'lade'), a place to store (Danish: 'stakke') loads of straw and grain, a nickname inspired by "the open and visible beams under the roof" which people would "decide to crawl up onto" for a birds-eye view of the show.

=== Europe '72, Vol. 6: Tivoli Concert Hall, Copenhagen, Denmark (4/17/1972) ===
In the liner notes for the show on 4/17/72 Blair Jackson writes that "Video and film representations of the Dead in the early '70s are few and far between" making "The 13 songs shot in Denmark that night, using multiple cameras, give us perhaps the best unfiltered look of the Dead in that era", despite the fact that "the cameras weren't on for the third set". After describing the visual scene and a few of the songs, he claims "it's the version of 'Big Railroad Blues' that makes this telecast" because one by one the band members put on masks and "clown wigs with baldpates and bright, crazy Bozo hair" which Bob tells "the, no doubt, confused audience" are "for the TV cameras, you must understand". Blair closes his piece by declaring "It's the Bozo and Bolo Bus Revue in all their glory" who have, "for this tour", actually somehow "passed for 'normal'."

=== Europe '72, Vol. 7: Beat Club, Bremen, West Germany (4/21/1972) ===
In the liner notes for the show on 4/21/72 Blair Jackson introduces "Beat-Club" as "Germany's first major rock 'n' roll TV show, on the air monthly (or so) since September 1965" and claims that "everyone who was anyone in rock music in the late '60s and early '70s showed up on Beat-Club at one time or another". He goes on to write that while most "acts probably came to the studio with a good idea of what [one or two] song(s) they wanted to highlight and knocked it out quickly", the Dead "played a remarkable 80-minute set that mixed short songs with big jamming tunes". After describing most of the songs in the single set of music they played at this venue, Jackson decides to focus on "the six minutes after the second verse of 'The Other One'," and the idiosyncratic ending to their final song, "which is a mess worthy of the laugh that follows it", closing his piece with a reference to the fairy tale: "And with that the Town Musicians of Bremen were gone."

=== Europe '72, Vol. 8: Rheinhalle, Düsseldorf, West Germany (4/24/1972) ===
In the liner notes for the show on 4/24/72 Blair Jackson begins with "Let us now praise Keith Godchaux", and then proceeds to effusively do just that, following this first single-sentence paragraph with five more much longer ones detailing Keith's contributions to many of the songs the band performed that night. Using phrases such as "notes dancing on air", "high tinkling that sets the stage for the later jam", and "great bursts of odd chords" he describes Godchaux's part in the songs "Black-Throated Wind", "Playing in the Band", and "Dark Star". And after comparing his style to that of Cecil Taylor, Floyd Cramer, and Otis Spann, the author ends his notes by saying that "Jerry Lee Godchaux" may have "never looked flashy, but, man, that guy could really rock it! And he was never better than he was in 1972."

=== Europe '72, Vol. 9: Jahrhunderthalle, Frankfurt, West Germany (4/26/1972) ===
In the liner notes for the show on 4/26/72 David Gans devotes the first half of his contribution to the Dead's penchant for making a mistake, covering it up, discussing it later, and then occasionally turning it into a "new arrangement". As an example of this process, he shares a detailed description of the progression from "Lovelight" into "Goin' Down the Road Feeling Bad" from this show as one of the "group-mind moments" that was "just this beautiful, sort of telepathic thing." Quoting extensively from a radio interview Gans and Marty Martinez did with Bob Weir and Phil Lesh in 1997, the author writes of how Phil encountered "his doppelganger at the Jahrhundert Halle", identifies the audience as being "mostly servicemen, from the [U.S. Army] Wiesbaden Air Base", and closes his piece by quoting the bassist as saying "I enjoyed every bit of it. It was great to be in Europe."

=== Europe '72, Vol. 10: Musikhalle, Hamburg, West Germany (4/29/1972) ===
In the liner notes for the show on 4/29/72 Steve Silberman starts by revealing that the "ragtag band of Northern California freaks" felt like Germany was "a country haunted by the past", with "dream-castles shimmering on the Rhine", "ghosts of Nazi kommandants", "and the gods of Phil's musical pantheon calling the fire of the muses down from Heaven or up from hell." He goes on to assert that this atmosphere "charged some of the most electrifying performances in the Dead's 30-year career", citing "Playing in the Band" which went for "the galactic core just three minutes into the first set" to "Dark Star" which "probe[d] regions of dissonance that would give most latter-day jam bands the vapors" as examples. After acknowledging that this show had "one of the few double encores of the tour", Silberman closes his piece by quoting lyricist Robert Hunter who, realizing that "worlds cannot be saved" declared that "we learned to dance on graves and be glad."

=== Europe '72, Vol. 11: Olympia Theatre, Paris, France (5/3/1972) ===
In the liner notes for the show on 5/3/72 Steve Silberman starts by telling of how "Jerry and Mountain Girl got themselves a room at the [InterContinental Paris Le] Grand Hotel with a balcony" in "the city of Proust and Picasso", and listing some of the many acts—from Edith Piaf to the Beatles to James Brown—who had played at the "storied venue" in the past. After describing the band's "synergy" as "indistinguishable from telepathy" and the "down-home warmth" brought to the stage by Pigpen, Donna, and Keith, he zeroes in on "the thrilling moment when Bob stepped up to lead a charge from 'China Cat Sunflower' into 'I Know You Rider'." Claiming "The first set was such a complete experience that many locals assumed the show was over when Bob called for the break", the author mostly glosses over the second set, even though it was "more dynamic than the first", and closes his piece by noting "Jerry and M.G. headed back to their angelic aerie" where, "For another night, they were sitting on top of the world."

=== Europe '72, Vol. 12: Olympia Theatre, Paris, France (5/4/1972) ===
In the liner notes for the show on 5/4/72 Jeff Tamarkin opens his piece by quoting the Cole Porter song "I love Paris in the springtime" and paints a romantic scene of "sentimental images of breathtaking days and amorous nights", then asks "Just what the hell did the French make of Pigpen?" Observing that Ron McKernan "may very well have been the most un-French guy on the planet", the author acknowledges that "Those who knew him tell of his sweetness and romanticism" and to "focus solely on Pigpen's image is to do him an injustice." Finding it difficult to identify any highlights in the Dead's second show in Paris, Tamarkin declares it was "A little of everything that was the Grateful Dead", and despite the power going out at one point, "the electricity in the Parisian air, channeled by the Grateful Dead, never went away for a second. Splendide!"

=== Europe '72, Vol. 13: Bickershaw Festival, Wigan, England (5/7/1972) ===
In the liner notes for the show on 5/7/72 Simon Robinson has next to nothing positive to say about the venue, which he claims was "a desolate swamp" that had "a sign by the lake with the terse warning 'crap in water, do not drink'," in weather that "was unseasonably cold, with frequent rain" and "a bitter wind." Claiming this was made bearable by Dr. John's performance on Friday and Captain Beefheart & His Magic Band, "who played an awesome and astonishing set" on Saturday, the author writes that on Sunday "At last, it was time for the grand finale—and the Dead did not disappoint." Happy that "for the first time in three days the sun appeared" and the band "played on and on despite the cold", Robinson ends his piece by writing "Due to the magic of the music and the resilience of the estimated 30,000 attendees, the vast majority appeared to have had a great time despite the conditions, which, by the end, had paled into insignificance."

=== Europe '72, Vol. 14: Concertgebouw, Amsterdam, Holland (5/10/1972) ===
In the liner notes for the show on 5/10/72 Blair Jackson writes that the "sold-out audience of about 2,000" was greeted with "another skull-fuck of an evening on the Dead's Europe tour", which was "about three-and-a half hours" long and thus "one of the longest" of the 22 shows. Acknowledging that "The first set at Concertgebouw doesn't serve up any unusual song choices", he divides the second set into "three distinct sections", with the "second module" comprising the songs "Beat It on Down the Line" through "another passionate reading of 'Sing Me Back Home' ", and claiming the songs in "the final sprint" end with a "super submarine sandwich with all the fixin's." Jackson then insists on getting "something off my chest" and shifts gears into sharing some details about "how extensively the Dead had overdubbed vocals for the 'Europe '72' album", ultimately revealing that the "vocal coda on 'He's Gone'—'Oo-oo-oo, nothin's gonna bring him back'—was not from" this show, but from a later performance, stating "it was kind of a shock to recall that in the first versions it wasn't there."

=== Europe '72, Vol. 15: Grote Zaal, De Doelen, Rotterdam, Holland (5/11/1972) ===
In the liner notes for the show on 5/11/72 Blair Jackson starts by declaring "All you really need to know about this Rotterdam concert is that it was former Grateful Dead vault-keeper Dick Latvala's favorite show from the Europe '72 tour." After describing the venue, which is "a beautiful, modern symphony hall (built in 1966) that holds 2,200", he spends most of his contribution describing in painstaking detail why the version of 'Dark Star' the band played that night is "quite unlike the others on the tour (though, of course, they're all different, one to the next)." Having revealed earlier that Latvala enjoyed "big, fat, juicy jams" more than anything else, he claims that this version of "Dark Star", along with the "first set filled with new and old favorites, and a second-set-opening 'Morning Dew' " explain why he "loved this show so much, and why more than 100,000 people downloaded it from archive.org."

=== Europe '72, Vol. 16: Lille Fairgrounds, Lille, France (5/13/1972) ===
In the liner notes for the show on 5/13/72 Nicholas Meriwether, a Grateful Dead archivist at UC Santa Cruz, explains that the show had been "Originally scheduled [for] halfway through the tour, right after the two Paris shows", but had to be postponed due to "an aggrieved young radical" who "After a losing encounter with some ice cream ... decided his revenge would also be served cold." Thus, when the band showed up in Lille the first time, they were unable to play because "much of their equipment remained in Paris in its truck, mired in the politics of adulterated gas", and they had to escape what Bob called a "good and proper" thumping by an irate audience "through the back window." This show is the result of them coming "back to Lille to make up the show" which, despite being interrupted by a rain storm, turned out to be a "delicate beauty of a day reclaimed and made magic in the way that only the Dead could do."

=== Europe '72, Vol. 17: La Grande Salle Du Grand Theatre, Luxembourg (5/16/1972) ===
In the liner notes for the show on 5/15/72 David Gans reveals the Dead performed this show to "an audience of around 500 people" on "The radio Luxembourg show", which "aired in various formats and frequencies around Europe and globally via shortwave." In his notes Gans quotes several people, including Tony Middleton who claimed that "Luxembourg was always 'famous' for poor reception" and Bill Giles, who recalled getting "lots of static" which made his attempts to record the show "more frustrating than satisfying". After explaining that "This show is a good deal shorter than the other performances on the tour" because the band was allowed only a "three-hour time slot", the author writes that "There is nothing qualitative missing: performance and song selection are otherwise typical of the tour, which is to say brilliant, passionate, inspired, free of major train wrecks, and completely committed to both the songs and the jams."

=== Europe '72, Vol. 18: Kongressaal, Munich, West Germany (5/18/1972) ===
In the liner notes for the show on 5/18/72 Blair Jackson starts with the claim that "One of the most-quoted remarks about the Europe '72 tour is Phil's admiring comment that Bill Kruetzmann 'played like a young god!' " He then devotes most of his contribution to detailing why this is "So true" by telling, for example, of how "Bill is right on top of" the changes in tempo in "Jack Straw", and how "On 'El Paso,' his drums cut up the tune's fast waltz time into little bursts of cowboy gunfire", and describing "Bill's whip-cracking stick work" as someone who is "battering his toms and cymbals like a man possessed". Jackson closes by noting the audience "is then treated to one of just two double encores on the Europe tour, with Merle Haggard's 'Sing Me Back Home' bittersweet touch" and "another kick-out-the-jams 'Saturday Night,' Billy as fresh and full of invention as he was more than three hours earlier."

=== Europe '72, Vol. 19: Lyceum Theatre, London, England (5/23/1972) ===
In the liner notes for the show on 5/23/1972 Sam Cutler opens by contrasting the Lyceum with the Wembley Empire Pool, the first venue on the tour, and describing this venue as "A small, 2,500-seat venue slap in the middle of London, built as a theatre in the late-19th century", which "was exactly the right venue" for the occasion. Describing it as "all gold leaf and crumbling wallpaper" with a staff "in bow ties and maroon jackets" and "run with British stiff-upper-lip military precision", he asserts it was the perfect place for the Dead to "reduce to a more relaxed form of chaos where everyone could have a California version of anarchic fun." After naming and acknowledging the individuals in the European Promoters Group who "took a chance" and helped organize the tour of a band "they had heard but never seen", Cutler closes his piece by asking "What can one say about the music?" and then answering his question with "There is nothing like a Grateful Dead concert."

=== Europe '72, Vol. 20: Lyceum Theatre, London, England (5/24/1972) ===
In the liner notes for the show on 5/24/1972 Chris Jones gives a very personal account of having seen many shows at the venue before seeing the Dead there, and of how, although he "was an inexperienced taper and did all the wrong things", he would nonetheless use a cassette tape recorder to record this and other shows he went to, including the band's earlier shows at the Wembley Pool and Bickershaw. Having attended the first three of the Dead's four shows at the Lyceum, he claims that they "are still, almost 40 years later, my favourite gigs of all time." After describing the "huge piles of freebies we could help ourselves to by the side doors", Jones admits that although "the only thing I can remember of the music is that the band was brilliant" he still regrets not seeing the fourth show, and that "Those gigs on the Europe tour were so remarkable that they left me a confirmed and committed Dead Head."

=== Europe '72, Vol. 21: Lyceum Theatre, London, England (5/25/1972) ===
In the liner notes for the show on 5/25/1972 Alex Allan starts off by writing that after being "knocked out by seeing the Dead for the first time live at Bickershaw" he "went to all the Lyceum shows—taking time off from Cambridge University to drive up to London." Writing that " 'Live/Dead' had been a revelation" and that he'd "lapped up their studio recordings too", he adds that the shows were "a great experience, especially on a tour when they were playing with such energy and so clearly enjoying themselves." Regarding the show on the 25th, Allan claims that "the amazing 'Dark Star' in the second set" was most memorable and that it "seemed to go on forever", then closes his notes by revealing his only regret is that, after returning to Cambridge, he missed seeing the band "when they reportedly stopped off their bus to see King's College Chapel, right next door to my college rooms in Cambridge."

=== Europe '72, Vol. 22: Lyceum Theatre, London, England (5/26/1972) ===
In the liner notes for the show on May 26, 1972, David Gans begins by stating the obvious, that "Two whole sides of the three-disc Europe '72 album came from this show", then reveals the not-so-obvious by quoting Bill Giles' recollection of the "clarity and warmth" of the sound that was "staggering for British ears accustomed to Marshall amplification rather than Fender; the sound was totally enveloping". He then proceeds to dissect "the 71-minute sequence that forms the bulk of set two—"Truckin'" through "Sing Me Back Home" " by, for example, noting that "There is a tidal feel, no one instrument leading the charge but everybody taking a turn on the crest of the wave" and quoting David Crosby's term for this style, "electronic Dixieland". Gans then starts to wrap things up by observing that "The Dead's wine always took on the flavor of its barrel: you could always feel an aggressive edge in New York, for example", quoting Bob Weir rather extensively explaining how and why they did this—both in America and on the Europe tour—and closing the piece with Weir stating "I think that was owing to the fact that we were trying to leave no child behind."
