= Europe '72: Wembley Empire Pool, London, England (4/7/1972) =

Live album by Grateful Dead
- Released: October 3, 2011
- Recorded: April 7, 1972
- Venue: Wembley Empire Pool, London, England
- Genre: Rock
- Length: 163:28
- Label: Rhino
- Producer: Grateful Dead

Grateful Dead chronology
Europe '72 Volume 2 (2011)	Europe '72: Wembley Empire Pool, London, England (4/7/1972) (2011)	Europe '72: Beat Club, Bremen, West Germany (4/21/1972) (2011)

Europe '72: Wembley Empire Pool, London, England (4/7/1972) is a live album by the Grateful Dead. It was released along with Europe '72 Volume 2 and the Europe '72 box set. It was the first concert of the tour. The next album after the Europe '72 series was Road Trips Volume 4 Number 5.

== Track listing ==
Disc 1

First set:

1. "Greatest Story Ever Told" (Bob Weir, Mickey Hart, Robert Hunter) – 5:24
2. "Sugaree" (Jerry Garcia, Hunter) – 7:08
3. "Chinatown Shuffle" (Ron "Pigpen" McKernan) – 3:02
4. "Me and My Uncle" (John Phillips) – 3:38 (Note: Also released on Europe '72 Volume 2.)
5. "China Cat Sunflower" (Garcia, Hunter) > – 5:33
6. "I Know You Rider" (traditional, arranged by Grateful Dead) – 5:14
7. "Big Boss Man" (Al Smith, Luther Dixon) – 4:38 (Note: "Big Boss Man" inexplicably stopped being recorded with less than a minute to go in the song. Also, it appears "Casey Jones" was performed later in the same set, but was not recorded.)
8. "Black-Throated Wind" (Weir, John Perry Barlow) – 5:55
9. "Loser" (Garcia, Hunter) – 6:55
10. "Mr. Charlie" (McKernan, Hunter) – 4:56
11. "Beat It On Down the Line" (Jesse Fuller) – 3:58
12. "Tennessee Jed" (Garcia, Hunter) – 7:02

Disc 2

1. "Playing in the Band" (Weir, Hart, Hunter) – 10:04

Second set:

2. "Truckin'" (Garcia, Phil Lesh, Weir, Hunter) > – 10:53 (Note: Previously released on Steppin' Out with the Grateful Dead: England '72.)
3. "Drums" (Bill Kreutzmann) > – 2:39
4. "The Other One" (Weir, Kreutzmann) > – 19:36
5. "El Paso" (Marty Robbins) > – 4:44
6. "The Other One" (Weir, Kreutzmann) > – 8:20
7. "Wharf Rat" (Garcia, Hunter) – 10:58

Disc 3

1. "Ramble On Rose" (Garcia, Hunter) – 6:21
2. "Sugar Magnolia" (Weir, Hunter) – 7:56
3. "Not Fade Away" (Norman Petty, Charles Hardin) > – 4:19
4. "Goin' Down the Road Feeling Bad" (traditional, arranged by Grateful Dead) > – 6:08
5. "Not Fade Away" (Petty, Hardin) – 3:42

Encore:

6. "One More Saturday Night" (Weir) – 4:36
