= Hundred Year Hall =

Live album by Grateful Dead
- Released: September 26, 1995
- Recorded: April 26, 1972
- Venue: Jahrhunderthalle (Frankfurt)
- Genre: Rock
- Length: 142:23
- Label: Grateful Dead
- Producers: John Cutler; Phil Lesh

Grateful Dead chronology
Dick's Picks Volume 2 (1995)	Hundred Year Hall (1995)	Dick's Picks Volume 3 (1995)

Professional ratings
Review scores
Source	Rating
Allmusic	3/5 stars
The Music Box	5/5 stars

Hundred Year Hall is a two-CD live album by the Grateful Dead. It was the first album to be released after Jerry Garcia's death, and one of the first releases in a continuing rush of live albums from the band's vault. It contains about two thirds of the April 26 concert at the Jahrhunderthalle in Frankfurt, West Germany, during the Dead's Spring 1972 tour of Europe (a tour originally represented by the Europe '72 album, released in 1972; though that release contained no tracks from the Frankfurt date). Disc one includes a number of songs from the first set, followed by the last part of the second set. Disc two includes the first part of the second set.

Hundred Year Hall was certified Gold by the RIAA on January 8, 1997.

The concert in its entirety was later released as part of Europe '72: The Complete Recordings (with the previously released tracks receiving a slightly different mix).

"Hundred Year Hall" is a literal translation of "Jahrhunderthalle"; "Centennial Hall" is the usual translation.

== Set list ==
Following is the full set list from the April 26, 1972, concert in Frankfurt.

- First set: "Bertha"*, "Me and My Uncle"*, "Mr. Charlie", "He's Gone", "Black-Throated Wind", "Next Time You See Me"*, "China Cat Sunflower"* → "I Know You Rider"*, "Jack Straw"*, "Big Railroad Blues"*, "Playing in the Band"*, "Chinatown Shuffle", "Loser", "Beat It On Down the Line", "You Win Again", "Good Lovin'", "Dire Wolf", "Casey Jones"
- Second set: "Truckin'"* → "The Other One"* → "Comes a Time"* → "Sugar Magnolia"*, "El Paso", "Tennessee Jed", "Greatest Story Ever Told", "The Stranger (Two Souls in Communion)"**, "Turn On Your Love Light"* → "Goin' Down the Road Feeling Bad"* → "One More Saturday Night"*

*appears on Hundred Year Hall
** later released as a bonus track on Europe '72

== Track listing ==
Disc one

1. "Bertha" (Jerry Garcia, Robert Hunter) – 5:41
2. "Me and My Uncle" (John Phillips) – 3:05
3. "Next Time You See Me" (Earl Forest, William Harvey) – 4:15
4. "China Cat Sunflower" (Garcia, Hunter) – 5:14 →
5. "I Know You Rider" (traditional, arranged by Grateful Dead) – 5:14
6. "Jack Straw" (Bob Weir, Hunter) – 4:47
7. "Big Railroad Blues" (Noah Lewis) – 3:54
8. "Playing in the Band" (Weir, Mickey Hart, Hunter) – 9:17
9. "Turn On Your Love Light" (Deadric Malone, Joseph Scott) – 19:13 →
10. "Goin' Down the Road Feeling Bad" (traditional, arranged by Grateful Dead) – 7:32 →
11. "One More Saturday Night" (Weir) – 4:44

Disc two

1. "Truckin'" (Garcia, Weir, Phil Lesh, Hunter) – 17:45 →
2. "Cryptical Envelopment" (Weir, Kreutzmann) – 36:29 →
3. "Comes a Time" (Garcia, Hunter) – 6:45 →
4. "Sugar Magnolia" (Weir, Hunter) – 7:23

Note: "The Other One" is erronenously labeled as "Crypitcal Envelopment".

== Personnel ==
- Jerry Garcia – lead guitar, vocals
- Bob Weir – rhythm guitar, vocals
- Phil Lesh – bass guitar, vocals
- Ron "Pigpen" McKernan – harmonica, vocals, organ
- Keith Godchaux – piano
- Donna Godchaux – vocals
- Bill Kreutzmann – drums

=== Production ===
- John Cutler – producer
- Phil Lesh – producer
- Jeffrey Norman – mastering
- Dick Latvala – tape archivist
- Gecko Graphics – artwork and design
- Robert Hunter – CD liner notes

== Charts ==
Album – Billboard

Year	Chart	Position
1995	The Billboard 200	26
