= Europe '72 Volume 2 =

Europe 72 Volume 2

Live album by Grateful Dead
- Released: September 20, 2011
- Recorded: April 7 – May 26, 1972
- Genre: Rock
- Length: 155:01
- Label: Rhino
- Producer: Grateful Dead

Grateful Dead chronology
Europe '72: The Complete Recordings (2011)	Europe 72 Volume 2 (2011)	Europe '72: Wembley Empire Pool, London, England (4/7/1972) (2011)

Europe '72 Volume 2 is a live album by the rock band the Grateful Dead. It is a two-CD set which features 20 tracks from the band's Spring 1972 tour of Europe. As such, it represents a belated sequel to the band's original three-LP 1972 release, Europe '72. Around the time of the production of the massive Europe '72: The Complete Recordings box set in 2011, Grateful Dead archivist David Lemieux was charged with the task of developing this follow-up compilation, nearly four decades later, without repeating any of the songs that appeared on Europe '72. As with the box set, all of the music for this CD was remastered from the original 16-track tapes and encoded with HDCD specifications. The artwork for the release is by Stanley Mouse, who, along with his late partner, Alton Kelley, created the recognizable images for the original release.

== Critical reception ==
Professional ratings
Review scores
Source	Rating
Allmusic	3.5/5 stars
Glide Magazine	4/5 stars

On Allmusic, Richie Unterberger wrote, "The triple-live album Europe '72 is an iconic record not just to Deadheads, but to almost anyone who was around Grateful Dead fans or going to college in the subsequent decade, so often was it blasted out of dorm windows. Almost 40 years later, the double-CD Europe '72, Vol. 2 has about two and a half more hours of performances from the Dead's spring 1972 tour.... [The] 20 songs were deliberately selected to avoid duplicating any songs on the first Europe '72. That does mean some Dead standards featured on the original triple-LP are absent... But this installment is hardly short on familiar Dead numbers... There are also some relatively little-heard originals... Fans of their spaciest psychedelic excursions should be sated by the nearly hourlong jam on "Dark Star" and "The Other One" that opens disc two, though that might test the tolerance of less committed Deadheads. The set features good sound and the kind of loose performances that Grateful Dead fans treasure in live recordings..."

On Glide Magazine, Doug Collette said, "Carefully selected by archivist David Lemieux from various tour stops on the Grateful Dead's first trip abroad, this package is deliberately conceived as a companion piece to the original Europe 72. As such, Volume 2 functions brilliantly as a complement to that seminal inclusion in the Grateful Dead discography. Instead of the tightly structured material that dominated the triple album (on its release designed to fulfill the band's commitment to Warner Bros Records so they could start their own label), this two CD release is filled with cover songs like "Me & My Uncle" and original material that by and large lends itself to improvisation, such as the nearly thirty-minute set of segues from "Dark Star" to "Drums" and into "The Other One.""

Writing on JamBands.com, John Patrick Gatta said, "For the cash-strapped [i.e. those who can not afford to buy Europe '72: The Complete Recordings] there's this two-CD set, Europe '72 Volume 2, a worthy successor to the legendary Europe '72 triple vinyl album. It compiles 20 tracks from seven different locales with updated cover art by Stanley Mouse of the Ice Cream Kid.... Much of disc one becomes a tribute to Ron "Pigpen" McKernan... On disc two the musical explorations arrive.... [Disc two] draws on nearly all elements of the Dead's range with never a dull moment to be found. It should also be pointed out that both discs sound amazing! One expects good things from the folks at Grateful Dead Productions but the clarity of these tapes is really a treasure. Even if you were never there, you can still feel as if you're reliving the moment."

== Track listing ==
Disc one
No.	Title	Writer(s)	Recording date/venue	Length
1.	"Bertha"	Jerry Garcia, Robert Hunter	April 14, 1972, Tivoli Concert Hall, Copenhagen	5:53
2.	"Me and My Uncle"	John Phillips	April 7, 1972, Wembley Empire Pool, London	3:13
3.	"Chinatown Shuffle""	Ron "Pigpen" McKernan	April 14, 1972, Tivoli Concert Hall, Copenhagen	2:38
4.	"Sugaree"	Garcia, Hunter	May 3, 1972, L'Olympia, Paris	6:56
5.	"Beat It On Down The Line"	Jesse Fuller	May 16, 1972, Le Grand Salle du Grand Theatre, Luxembourg	3:11
6.	"Loser"	Garcia, Hunter	April 14, 1972, Tivoli Concert Hall, Copenhagen	6:29
7.	"Next Time You See Me""	Bill Harvey, Earl Forest	May 4, 1972, L'Olympia, Paris	4:57
8.	"Black-Throated Wind"	Bob Weir, John Barlow	April 14, 1972, Tivoli Concert Hall, Copenhagen	6:00
9.	"Dire Wolf"	Garcia, Hunter	April 26, 1972, Jahrhundert Halle, Frankfurt	4:46
10.	"Greatest Story Ever Told"	Weir, Mickey Hart, Barlow	May 3, 1972, L'Olympia, Paris	4:52
11.	"Deal"	Garcia, Hunter	May 4, 1972, L'Olympia, Paris	5:05
12.	"Good Lovin'"	Rudy Clark, Arthur Resnick	April 26, 1972, Jahrhundert Halle, Frankfurt	12:09
13.	"Playing in the Band"	Weir, Hart, Hunter	May 24, 1972, Strand Lyceum, London	11:55
Total length:				78:04

Disc two
No.	Title	Writer(s)	Recording date/venue	Length
1.	"Dark Star →"	Garcia, Hart, Bill Kreutzmann, Phil Lesh, McKernan, Weir, Hunter	May 7, 1972, Bickershaw Festival, Wigan	19:49
2.	"Drums →"	Kreutzmann	May 7, 1972, Bickershaw Festival, Wigan	2:24
3.	"The Other One →"	Weir, Kreutzmann	May 7, 1972, Bickershaw Festival, Wigan	30:27
4.	"Sing Me Back Home"	Merle Haggard	May 26, 1972, Strand Lyceum, London	10:58
5.	"Not Fade Away →"	Charles Hardin, Norman Petty	April 7, 1972, Wembley Empire Pool, London	4:24
6.	"Goin' Down the Road Feeling Bad →"	Traditional, arranged by Grateful Dead	April 7, 1972, Wembley Empire Pool, London	6:08
7.	"Not Fade Away"	Hardin, Petty	April 7, 1972, Wembley Empire Pool, London	2:45
Total length:				76:57

== Recording dates ==
The tracks have been taken from the following shows:

April 7, 1972, at Wembley Empire Pool, London

- "Me and My Uncle"
- "Not Fade Away" → "Goin' Down The Road Feeling Bad" → "Not Fade Away"

April 14, 1972, at Tivoli Concert Hall, Copenhagen

- "Bertha"
- "Chinatown Shuffle"
- "Loser"
- "Black-Throated Wind"

April 17, 1972, at Tivoli Concert Hall, Copenhagen

- "Big Railroad Blues"

April 26, 1972, at Jahrhundert Hall, Frankfurt

- "Dire Wolf"
- "Good Lovin'"

May 3, 1972, at Olympia Theatre, Paris

- "Sugaree"
- "Greatest Story Ever Told"

May 4, 1972, at Olympia Theatre, Paris

- "Next Time You See Me"
- "Deal"

May 7, 1972, at Bickershaw Festival, Wigan, England

- "Dark Star" → "Drums" → "The Other One"

May 16, 1972, at Theatre Hall, Luxembourg

- "Beat It On Down The Line"

May 24, 1972, at Strand Lyceum, London

- "Playing In The Band"

May 26, 1972, at Strand Lyceum, London

- "Sing Me Back Home"

== Personnel ==
=== Grateful Dead ===
- Jerry Garcia – lead guitar, vocals
- Donna Jean Godchaux – vocals
- Keith Godchaux – piano
- Bill Kreutzmann – drums
- Phil Lesh – electric bass, vocals
- Ron "Pigpen" McKernan – organ, harmonica, percussion, vocals
- Bob Weir – rhythm guitar, vocals
- Robert Hunter – songwriter

=== Production ===
- Produced for release by David Lemieux
- Executive producer: Mark Pinkus
- Mixed by Jeffrey Norman at Prairie Sun Recording, Cotati, CA
- CD mastering by David Glasser, Airshow Mastering, Boulder, CO
- Recording by Betty Cantor, Janet Furman, Bob Matthews, Rosie, Wizard
- Cover artwork by Stanley Mouse
- Package design by Steve Vance
