= Dave's Picks Volume 2 =

Live album by Grateful Dead
- Released: May 1, 2012
- Recorded: July 31, 1974
- Genre: Rock
- Length: 216:40; Bonus disc: 75:25
- Label: Rhino
- Producer: Grateful Dead

Grateful Dead chronology
| Dark Star (2012) | Dave's Picks Volume 2 (2012) | Dave's Picks Volume 3 (2012) |

Alternative cover
- Dave's Picks 2012 Bonus Disc

Dave's Picks Volume 2 is a three-CD live album by the rock band the Grateful Dead. It was recorded on July 31, 1974, at Dillon Stadium in Hartford, Connecticut. It was released on May 1, 2012.

The album contains the complete July 31, 1974 concert, except for "Seastones". This musical piece was written by Ned Lagin. It was performed by Lagin and Grateful Dead bassist Phil Lesh between the second and third sets of the concert. "Seastones" is a loosely structured composition, partially improvised in performance, that is an early example of electronic music, with many of the sounds generated using synthesizers and computers. Part of the June 28, 1974 performance of "Seastones" was included in Dick's Picks Volume 12.

Dave's Picks Volume 2 was the second in the Dave's Picks series of Grateful Dead archival releases, the successor to the Road Trips series. It was a limited edition of 12,000 copies, all but 2,500 of which were pre-sold with the 2012 Dave's Picks subscription series.

A bonus disc was included with shipments of the album to 2012 Dave's Picks subscribers. This disc contains tracks recorded on July 29, 1974 at the Capital Centre in Landover, Maryland.

Dave's Picks Volume 2 was released as a seven-disc vinyl LP on February 2, 2024, in a limited edition of 5,000 copies.

== Track listing ==
Disc 1
First set:

1. "Scarlet Begonias" (Jerry Garcia, Robert Hunter) – 8:21
2. "Me and My Uncle" (John Phillips) – 3:14
3. "Brown Eyed Women" (Garcia, Hunter) – 4:49
4. "Beat It On Down the Line" (Jesse Fuller) – 3:38
5. "Mississippi Half-Step Uptown Toodeloo" > (Garcia, Hunter) – 8:01
6. "It Must Have Been the Roses" (Hunter) – 5:24
7. "Mexicali Blues" (Bob Weir, John Perry Barlow) – 3:45
8. "Row Jimmy" (Garcia, Hunter) – 8:51
9. "Jack Straw" (Weir, Hunter) – 5:12
10. "China Cat Sunflower" > (Garcia, Hunter) – 9:03
11. "I Know You Rider" (traditional, arranged by Grateful Dead) – 5:56
12. "Around and Around" (Chuck Berry) – 5:03

Disc 2
Second set

1. "Bertha" (Garcia, Hunter) – 5:38
2. "Big River" (Johnny Cash) – 5:13
3. "Eyes of the World" > (Garcia, Hunter) – 18:30
4. "China Doll" (Garcia, Hunter) – 4:47
5. "Promised Land" (Berry) – 3:29
6. "Ship of Fools" (Garcia, Hunter) – 6:19
7. "Weather Report Suite" – 17:08

- "Prelude" (Weir)
- "Part 1" (Weir, Eric Andersen)
- "Let It Grow" (Weir, Barlow)

Third set:

8. "El Paso" (Marty Robbins) – 4:54
9. "Ramble On Rose" (Garcia, Hunter) – 6:27
10. "Greatest Story Ever Told" (Weir, Mickey Hart, Hunter) – 5:56

Disc 3

1. "To Lay Me Down" (Garcia, Hunter) – 8:09
2. "Truckin'" > (Garcia, Phil Lesh, Weir, Hunter) – 17:53
3. "Mind Left Body Jam" > (Grateful Dead) – 7:24
4. "Spanish Jam" > (Grateful Dead) – 5:40
5. "Wharf Rat" (Garcia, Hunter) – 9:31
6. "U.S. Blues" (Garcia, Hunter) – 6:01
7. "One More Saturday Night" (Weir) – 5:43

Encore:

8. "Uncle John's Band" (Garcia, Hunter) – 6:26

Dave's Picks 2012 Bonus Disc
July 29, 1974, Capital Centre, Landover, Maryland:

1. "Sugaree" (Garcia, Hunter) – 7:03
2. "Weather Report Suite" – 19:31

- "Prelude" (Weir)
- "Part 1" (Weir, Andersen)
- "Let It Grow" (Weir, Barlow)

3. "He's Gone" > (Garcia, Hunter) – 13:24
4. "Truckin'" > (Garcia, Lesh, Weir, Hunter) – 8:16
5. "Nobody's Fault but Mine" > (traditional, arranged by Grateful Dead) – 4:02
6. "The Other One" > (Weir, Kreutzmann) – 8:55
7. "Spanish Jam" > (Grateful Dead) – 4:44
8. "Wharf Rat" (Garcia, Hunter) – 9:23

Note: The set list for the July 29, 1974 Capital Centre concert was:

First set: "Promised Land" · "Sugaree"^{[A]} · "Black-Throated Wind" · "It Must Have Been the Roses" · "Cumberland Blues" · "Scarlet Begonias" · "Jack Straw" · "Deal" · "El Paso" · "To Lay Me Down" · "Weather Report Suite Prelude"^{[A]} · "Weather Report Suite Part 1"^{[A]} · "Let It Grow"^{[A]}

Second set: "Seastones" · "He's Gone"^{[A]} · "Truckin'"^{[A]} · "Nobody's Fault but Mine"^{[A]} · "The Other One"^{[A]} · "Spanish Jam"^{[A]} · "Wharf Rat"^{[A]} · "Around and Around" · "Peggy-O" · "U.S. Blues" · "Sugar Magnolia"

Encore:: "Casey Jones"

[A] Included in Dave's Picks 2012 Bonus Disc

== Personnel ==
Grateful Dead

- Jerry Garcia – lead guitar, vocals
- Donna Jean Godchaux – vocals
- Keith Godchaux – keyboards
- Bill Kreutzmann – drums
- Phil Lesh – electric bass, vocals
- Bob Weir – rhythm guitar, vocals

Production

- Produced by Grateful Dead
- Produced for release by David Lemieux
- Executive producer: Mark Pinkus
- CD mastering: Jeffrey Norman
- Recording: Kidd Candelario
- Archival research: Nicholas Meriwether
- Tape research: Michael Wesley Johnson
- Cover art: Scott McDougall
- Photos: James R. Anderson, John Cantamessa, Mike Thut
- Art direction and design: Steve Vance
- Liner notes essay "Wave That Fla-ag..." written by Blair Jackson
