= Dave's Picks Volume 3 =

Live album by Grateful Dead
- Released: August 1, 2012
- Recorded: October 22, 1971
- Genre: Rock
- Length: 3:23:11
- Label: Rhino
- Producer: Grateful Dead

Grateful Dead chronology
Dave's Picks Volume 2 (2012)	Dave's Picks Volume 3 (2012)	Spring 1990 (2012)

Dave's Picks Volume 3 is a three-CD live album by the rock band the Grateful Dead. It features the complete concert recorded on October 22, 1971 at the Auditorium Theatre in Chicago, Illinois, plus bonus tracks from the previous night's show at the same venue. The album was released on August 1, 2012.

The two concerts featured on Dave's Picks Volume 3 were keyboardist Keith Godchaux's second and third performances with the Grateful Dead. At the time, Ron "Pigpen" McKernan was too ill to tour, although he was still a member of the band. Godchaux's first appearance with the Dead occurred on October 19, 1971, at Northrop Auditorium, Minneapolis, Minnesota. His sixth performance with the Grateful Dead, also from the same tour, has been released as Download Series Volume 3. Just two months prior, the band had played the Auditorium Theater with McKernan; a portion of the August 24th performance was released on Dick's Picks Volume 35.

Dave's Picks Volume 3 is the third installment in the Dave's Picks series of Grateful Dead archival releases, which succeeded the Road Trips series. It was produced as a limited edition of 12,000 copies.

== Critical reception ==
On All About Jazz, Doug Collette said, "Previous entries in Grateful Dead archive series have documented the quietly courageous, not to mention authoritative, fashion, by which keyboardist Keith Godchaux made a place of himself in the iconic band's lineup late in 1971, having been enlisted when charter member Ron 'Pigpen' McKernan became too ill to tour regularly. But [none make] the case so vividly as does this latest entry in Dave's Pick's Volume 3."

== Track listing ==
=== Disc 1 ===
First set:

1. "Bertha" (Jerry Garcia, Robert Hunter) – 6:12
2. "Me and My Uncle" (John Phillips) – 3:24
3. "Tennessee Jed" (Garcia, Hunter) – 6:33
4. "Jack Straw" (Bob Weir, Hunter) – 5:01
5. "Loser" (Garcia, Hunter) – 7:28
6. "Playing in the Band" (Weir, Mickey Hart, Hunter) – 6:31
7. "Sugaree" (Garcia, Hunter) – 7:20
8. "Beat It On Down the Line" (Jesse Fuller) – 3:55
9. "Black Peter" (Garcia, Hunter) – 9:18
10. "Mexicali Blues" (Weir, John Perry Barlow) – 3:45
11. "Cold Rain and Snow" (traditional, arranged by Grateful Dead) – 6:11
12. "Me and Bobby McGee" (Kris Kristofferson, Fred Foster) – 5:57

=== Disc 2 ===
1. "Comes a Time" (Garcia, Hunter) – 7:36
2. "One More Saturday Night" (Weir) – 4:37

Second set:

3. "Ramble On Rose" (Garcia, Hunter) – 6:27
4. "Cumberland Blues" (Garcia, Phil Lesh, Hunter) – 5:58
5. "That's It for the Other One" > – 28:06
  - "Cryptical Envelopment" (Garcia)
  - "Drums" (Bill Kreutzmann)
  - "The Other One" (Weir, Kreutzmann)
  - "Cryptical Envelopment" (Garcia)
6. "Deal" (Garcia, Hunter) – 5:33
7. "Sugar Magnolia" (Weir, Hunter) – 6:53
8. "Casey Jones" > (Garcia, Hunter) – 5:54
9. "Johnny B. Goode" (Chuck Berry) – 3:50

=== Disc 3 ===
Bonus tracks – October 21, 1971, Auditorium Theatre:

1. "Truckin'" (Garcia, Lesh, Weir, Hunter) – 11:11
2. "Big Railroad Blues" (Noah Lewis) – 3:27
3. "The Frozen Logger" (James Stevens) – 0:54
4. "Dark Star" > (Garcia, Hart, Kreutzmann, Lesh, Ron "Pigpen" McKernan, Weir, Hunter) – 14:57
5. "Sittin' on Top of the World" > (Walter Jacobs, Lonnie Carter) – 3:21
6. "Dark Star" > (Garcia, Hart, Kreutzmann, Lesh, McKernan, Weir, Hunter) – 2:12
7. "Me and Bobby McGee" (Kristofferson, Foster) – 6:16
8. "Brown-Eyed Women" (Garcia, Hunter) – 4:23
9. "St. Stephen" > (Garcia, Lesh, Hunter) – 5:54
10. "Johnny B. Goode" (Berry) – 4:14

== Personnel ==
=== Grateful Dead ===
- Jerry Garcia – lead guitar, vocals
- Keith Godchaux – keyboards
- Bill Kreutzmann – drums
- Phil Lesh – electric bass, vocals
- Bob Weir – rhythm guitar, vocals

=== Production ===
- Produced by Grateful Dead
- Produced for release by David Lemieux
- CD mastering by Jeffrey Norman
- Recorded by Rex Jackson
- Executive producer: Mark Pincus
- Associate producer: Doran Tyson
- Archival research: Nicholas Meriwether
- Tape research: Michael Wesley Johnson
- Cover art: Scott McDougall
- Photography: Chip Williams
- Art direction and design: Steve Vance
