= Europe '72 =

- The "Truckin' Foot" stepping over Europe

Live album by Grateful Dead
- Released: November 5, 1972
- Recorded: April–May 1972
- Genres: Jam rock; roots rock; psychedelic rock; blues rock
- Length: 109:35
- Labels: Warner Bros. 3WX 2668

Grateful Dead chronology
Grateful Dead (1971)	Europe '72 (1972)	History of the Grateful Dead, Volume One (Bear's Choice) (1973)

Singles from Europe '72
- 1. "Sugar Magnolia" Released: December 1972

Europe '72 is a live triple album by the Grateful Dead, released on November 5, 1972. It is the band's third live album and their eighth album overall. It covers the band's tour of Western Europe in April and May that year, and showcases live favorites, extended improvisations and several new songs including "Jack Straw" and "Brown Eyed Women". The album was the first to include pianist Keith Godchaux and his wife, vocalist Donna Jean Godchaux, and the last to feature founding member Ron "Pigpen" McKernan, who died shortly after its release.

The European tour was expensive and logistically complicated, and the band's record company hoped that a live album would recoup its costs. Consequently, the entire tour was recorded, with highlights making it onto the final release. Europe '72 is one of the most commercially successful and critically acclaimed albums by the Dead. It was one of the first triple-record rock albums to be certified gold by RIAA; the album has since been certified double platinum. A second volume was released in 2011, in conjunction with the release of the entire 22-date tour as Europe '72: The Complete Recordings.

== Tour ==
Prior to the Grateful Dead's 1972 tour of Western Europe, the band had undergone several changes in personnel. Drummer/percussionist Mickey Hart left the group in early 1971, making Bill Kreutzmann the group's sole drummer once again. Keyboardist Keith Godchaux was recruited, in September 1971, initially to augment founding member Ron "Pigpen" McKernan, who had been hospitalized and was experiencing increasingly poor health. Additionally, Godchaux's wife Donna (a former session singer who had worked with Percy Sledge and Elvis Presley) officially joined the band as a backup vocalist in March, shortly before the tour commenced.

As the band became more popular and they were booked into larger venues, the touring entourage encompassed extra road crew, administrative staff, friends and relatives, growing to 43 people who became known as the "Grateful Dead Family". The tour began with two nights at the Empire Pool, Wembley on April 7–8, 1972. It progressed through Denmark, Germany (including an appearance on the TV Show Beat Club) and France. The Dead returned to the UK to play the Bickershaw Festival on May 7 (Kreutzmann's birthday), progressing through continental Europe again (including a show recorded for Radio Luxembourg) and ending with a four-night stand at the Lyceum Theatre, London on May 23–26. The final show was the last that featured McKernan as a lead vocalist; he performed at one more show the following month before retiring from music, dying in March 1973.

By the time the tour started, lead guitarist Jerry Garcia had switched from using the Gibson SG to a 1959 Fender Stratocaster. He had become increasingly influenced by country and traditional American music. Songs such as "Jack Straw" stemmed from these influences, while "Cumberland Blues" and "Tennessee Jed" had lyrics relating to American historical culture. "Truckin'", which was then the band's biggest hit single, talked about the band's experiences on the road. The Dead began performing "China Cat Sunflower" (from Aoxomoxoa) as a medley with the traditional "I Know You Rider", linking their psychedelic past with the group's new direction.

== Recording ==
The band hoped that the expensive trip to Europe would be financially offset by the release of a live-album documentation of the tour. Consequently, the Dead’s record label, Warner Bros., paid for the band to travel with a professional 16-track recorder.

Europe '72 was the third live album by the Dead in as many years, showcasing how the group's reputation was based on live shows. The album contained mostly new material, in addition to live arrangements of tracks found on previous studio albums. Garcia continued his songwriting collaboration with lyricist Robert Hunter. Rhythm guitarist Bob Weir also collaborated with Hunter, though the pair subsequently fell out, leading Weir to collaborate with John Perry Barlow after Europe '72. Pigpen made his third singing-songwriting contribution to a Dead album, writing "Mr. Charlie" with Hunter. The new songs were never officially released in studio form except "One More Saturday Night", which came out as a single to promote the tour and then appeared on Bob Weir's solo album, Ace. Consequently, Europe '72 was treated as a new-material release as much as a live retrospective, and the new songs on the album were considered definitive versions.

Although Europe '72 is billed as a live album, the songs were subject to various studio overdubs, particularly vocals. Several of the songs with Garcia on lead vocals were pitched sharp by as much as a half-step. Weir later said that the overdubbing was a mutual decision by the band and the record company, and both were happy to polish up the album for release.

== Cover ==
The "Truckin' Fool" smashing ice cream against his head

Europe '72, like other Grateful Dead cover art, was designed by Alton Kelley and Stanley Mouse (known as Kelly/Mouse studios). An early title for the album was Steppin' Out; this title was eventually re-used for Steppin' Out with the Grateful Dead: England '72 (2002). The album was originally published as a triple-LP with an accompanying booklet. In contrast to the band's previous albums, the artwork is set against white, mostly-empty panels of (originally) a triple gatefold sleeve. The front cover shows a large "Truckin'" foot stepping across the Atlantic to Europe. The back cover depicts the corresponding "Truckin' Fool" smashing an ice cream cone against his forehead. Airborne drops of ice cream are drawn as a text ambigram, indistinctly spelling the word "LIVE".

The inside credits list all 43 members of the touring entourage such as Carolyn "Mountain Girl" Garcia. A color booklet contains photos of European sites and the concerts (including part of the entourage waiting to board a DFDS ferry at Newcastle), references to Revelation and the Feast of Fools, and a long account of how the tour split into two factions, the "Bozos" and the "Bolos". The conclusion is the first appearance of the epithet "There is nothing like a Grateful Dead concert".

== Release ==
Europe '72 was released on November 1, 1972, reaching No. 24 in the Billboard charts. The album was the first to feature Keith and Donna Jean Godchaux. It was also the last to feature McKernan. Several songs on which he sang lead were retired after the tour's finale at the Lyceum.

An edited version of the album's "Sugar Magnolia" was released as a 7" single, with "Mr. Charlie" as the B-side.

=== Reissues ===
Europe '72 was reissued as a two-disc CD in 1990 and again in 2001, with bonus tracks, as part of The Golden Road (1965–1973) box set. This version was subsequently released independently in 2003, which also has the covers reversed, with "The Fool" on the front. A sequel, Europe '72 Volume 2, was released in 2011. It contains songs that were played on the tour but not included on the original album, including a lengthy jam of "Dark Star" and "The Other One".

Fans have rated the album highly, and there was demand to hear recordings of the entire tour. In September 2011, all 22 shows were released as Europe '72: The Complete Recordings, a 73-CD box set. Due to higher than expected demand, the 7,200 numbered copies of the box set sold out as a pre-order in less than four days. The first three thousand copies ordered had an option for custom personalization. A music-only version (without the box set's steamer trunk and accoutrements) was also given a limited release.

A 50th Anniversary Edition of Europe '72 was released on July 29, 2022. The album was remastered and reissued as a two-disc CD and as a three-disc LP, as well as a digital download. A limited-edition three-disc LP on rainbow-colored vinyl was released on June 3, 2022.

== Reception ==
Professional ratings
Review scores
Source	Rating
AllMusic	5/5 stars
Christgau's Record Guide	B+
The Encyclopedia of Popular Music	3/5 stars
Entertainment Weekly	A−

Europe 72 was a commercial success, remaining in the US album charts for 24 weeks. It has since become one of the most successful Grateful Dead albums in terms of sales, and has been certified Double Platinum, selling over 1,000,000 copies.

The album was well received by music critics. Tom Dupree's contemporary review in Rolling Stone praised the sound fidelity and musicianship, especially Garcia's lead guitar playing: "He displays more sheer savvy of the guitar fretboard and its incorporation — but not sublimation — into the rock milieu than anyone I can think of". He also said "there are riffs of all kinds liberally scattered throughout". In 2015, the journal listed the album as number 19 in their top 50 live albums of all time. A retrospective AllMusic review praised Pigpen's contributions, ranking them as some of the best in his career, and noted the triple-LP format allowed the group's extended concert jams to be presented faithfully on record. A retrospective in Modern Drummer said Europe '72 was "a snapshot of the Dead at what many believe was its musical peak, before fatal drugs took hold, tight and hungry to explore spiritual spaces within music."

== Track listing ==
Side one
No.	Title	Writer(s)	Lead vocals	Length
1.	"Cumberland Blues"	Jerry Garcia; Phil Lesh; Robert Hunter	Garcia; Bob Weir	5:47
2.	"He's Gone"	Garcia; Hunter	Garcia	7:12
3.	"One More Saturday Night"	Weir	Weir	4:45
Total length:				17:29

Side two
No.	Title	Writer(s)	Lead vocals	Length
1.	"Jack Straw"	Weir; Hunter	Weir; Garcia	4:46
2.	"You Win Again"	Hank Williams	Garcia	3:54
3.	"China Cat Sunflower"	Garcia; Hunter	Garcia	5:33
4.	"I Know You Rider"	traditional (arranged by Grateful Dead)	Garcia; Weir; Lesh	4:55
Total length:				19:25

Side three
No.	Title	Writer(s)	Lead vocals	Length
1.	"Brown-Eyed Women"	Garcia; Hunter	Garcia	4:55
2.	"Hurts Me Too"	Elmore James; Marshall Sehorn	Ron "Pigpen" McKernan	7:18
3.	"Ramble On Rose"	Garcia; Hunter	Garcia	6:09
Total length:				18:02

Side four
No.	Title	Writer(s)	Lead vocals	Length
1.	"Sugar Magnolia"	Weir; Hunter	Weir	7:04
2.	"Mr. Charlie"	McKernan; Hunter	McKernan	3:40
3.	"Tennessee Jed"	Garcia; Hunter	Garcia	7:13
Total length:				17:57

Side five
No.	Title	Writer(s)	Lead vocals	Length
1.	"Truckin'"	Garcia; Lesh; Weir; Hunter	Garcia; Lesh; Weir	13:08
2.	"Epilog"	Garcia; Keith Godchaux; Bill Kreutzmann; Lesh; McKernan; Weir	instrumental	4:33
Total length:				18:16

Side six
No.	Title	Writer(s)	Lead vocals	Length
1.	"Prelude"	Garcia; K. Godchaux; Kreutzmann; Lesh; McKernan; Weir	instrumental	8:08
2.	"Morning Dew"	Bonnie Dobson; Tim Rose	Garcia	10:35
Total length:				19:18

2003 reissue bonus tracks

Disc one
No.	Title	Writer(s)	Lead vocals	Length
14.	"The Stranger (Two Souls in Communion)"	McKernan	McKernan	6:50
Total length:				79:53

Disc two
No.	Title	Writer(s)	Lead vocals	Length
5.	"Looks Like Rain"	Weir; John Perry Barlow	Weir	7:37
6.	"Good Lovin'"	Rudy Clark; Arthur Resnick	McKernan	18:30
7.	"Caution (Do Not Stop On Tracks)"	Garcia; Kreutzmann; Lesh; McKernan; Weir	McKernan	4:39
8.	"Who Do You Love?"	Ellas McDaniel	McKernan	0:23
9.	"Caution (Do Not Stop On Tracks)"	Garcia; Kreutzmann; Lesh; McKernan; Weir	McKernan	1:44
10.	"Good Lovin'"	Clark; Resnick	McKernan	3:04
11.	"The Yellow Dog Story"	Weir	Weir	3:09
Total length:				76:44

Notes:

- "Brown-Eyed Women" was titled as "Brown-Eyed Woman" on the original release.
- "Epilog" and "Morning Dew" are listed as "Epilogue" and "(Walk Me Out in the) Morning Dew", respectively, on the record label.

== Recording dates ==
Recording dates
Title	Date
"Cumberland Blues"	April 8, 1972; Empire Pool, London, England
"Looks Like Rain"	April 8, 1972; Empire Pool, London, England
"The Yellow Dog Story"	April 8, 1972; Empire Pool, London, England
"Brown-Eyed Women"	April 14, 1972; Tivoli Concert Hall, Copenhagen, Denmark
"Good Lovin'"	April 14, 1972; Tivoli Concert Hall, Copenhagen, Denmark
"Caution (Do Not Stop on Tracks)"	April 14, 1972; Tivoli Concert Hall, Copenhagen, Denmark
"Who Do You Love?"	April 14, 1972; Tivoli Concert Hall, Copenhagen, Denmark
"The Stranger (Two Souls in Communion)"	April 26, 1972; Jahrhunderthalle, Frankfurt, West Germany
"Jack Straw"	May 3, 1972; Olympia, Paris, France
"China Cat Sunflower"	May 3, 1972; Olympia, Paris, France
"I Know You Rider"	May 3, 1972; Olympia, Paris, France
"Tennessee Jed"	May 3, 1972; Olympia, Paris, France
"Sugar Magnolia"	May 4, 1972; Olympia, Paris, France
"He's Gone"	May 10, 1972; Concertgebouw, Amsterdam, Netherlands
"Mr. Charlie"	May 23, 1972; Lyceum Theatre, London, England
"You Win Again"	May 24, 1972; Lyceum Theatre, London, England
"Hurts Me Too"	May 24, 1972; Lyceum Theatre, London, England
"One More Saturday Night"	May 26, 1972; Lyceum Theatre, London, England
"Ramble on Rose"	May 26, 1972; Lyceum Theatre, London, England
"Truckin'"	May 26, 1972; Lyceum Theatre, London, England
"Epilog"	May 26, 1972; Lyceum Theatre, London, England
"Prelude"	May 26, 1972; Lyceum Theatre, London, England
"Morning Dew"	May 26, 1972; Lyceum Theatre, London, England

== Personnel ==
Taken from the sleeve notes:

Grateful Dead

- Jerry Garcia – lead guitar, vocals
- Bob Weir – rhythm guitar, vocals
- Phil Lesh – bass guitar, vocals
- Ron "Pigpen" McKernan – organ, harmonica, vocals
- Keith Godchaux – piano
- Bill Kreutzmann – drums
- Donna Godchaux – backing vocals
- Robert Hunter – songwriter

Production

- Heard, Jackson, Kid, Parrish, Ramrod, Razine, Winslow, Barry, Rudzo – equipment
- Dan Healy – technical assistance
- Candace Brightman, Ben Haller – stage lighting
- Betty Cantor, Janet Furman, Bob Matthews, Rosie, Wizard – recording
- Betty Cantor, Bob Matthews – mixing
- Kelley / Mouse Studios – cover art

== Charts ==
Chart (1972–1973)	Peak position
Canadian RPM 100 Albums	22
US Billboard Top LP's & Tape	24
US Cash Box Top 100 Albums	22
US Record World Album Chart	11

== Certifications ==
Region	Certification	Certified units/sales
United States (RIAA)	2× Platinum	2,000,000^{^}
^{^} Shipments figures based on certification alone.
