= Europe '72: Beat Club, Bremen, West Germany (4/21/1972) =

Live album by Grateful Dead
- Released: October 3, 2011
- Recorded: April 21, 1972
- Venue: Beat Club
- Genre: Rock
- Length: 79:28
- Label: Rhino
- Producer: Grateful Dead

Grateful Dead chronology
Europe '72: Wembley Empire Pool, London, England (4/7/1972) (2011)	Europe '72: Beat Club, Bremen, West Germany (4/21/1972) (2011)	Road Trips Volume 4 Number 5 (2011)

Europe '72: Beat Club, Bremen, West Germany (4/21/1972) is a live album by the Grateful Dead. It was recorded for the Beat-Club TV show instead of at a concert venue. It is notable for being the shortest concert of the tour, because it was a television performance. On the album, the songs "Loser" and "Black-Throated Wind" are not included (they were the soundcheck).

The video shot for the Beat-Club TV episode was shown in movie theaters in the U.S. on July 17, 2014, as that year's Grateful Dead Meet-Up at the Movies.

== Track listing ==
1. "Bertha" (Garcia, Hunter) – 6:06
2. "Playing in the Band" (Weir, Hart, Hunter) – 9:58
3. "Mr. Charlie" (McKernan, Hunter) – 4:05
4. "Sugaree" (Garcia, Hunter) – 7:53
5. "One More Saturday Night" (Weir) – 4:51
6. "Playing in the Band" (Weir, Hart, Hunter) – 10:56
7. "Beat It On Down the Line" (Fuller) – 3:03
8. "Truckin'" (Garcia, Lesh, Weir, Hunter) – 9:33
9. "Drums" (Kreutzmann) – 1:16
10. "The Other One" (Weir, Kreutzmann) – 21:47
