= Dark Star (album) =

Live album by Grateful Dead
- Released: April 21, 2012
- Recorded: May 4, 1972
- Genre: Psychedelic rock
- Length: 39:27
- Label: Rhino
- Producer: Grateful Dead

Grateful Dead chronology
Dave's Picks Volume 1 (2012)	Dark Star (2012)	Dave's Picks Volume 2 (2012)

Dark Star is a live album by the rock group the Grateful Dead. It was recorded on May 4, 1972, at the Olympia Theatre in Paris, France. It contains only one song from that concert – a version of "Dark Star" that, including an embedded drum solo, is almost 40 minutes long. It was produced as a vinyl LP in a limited edition of 4,200 copies, and released on April 21, 2012, in conjunction with Record Store Day.

The entire May 4, 1972, concert, like all of the shows from the Dead's 1972 tour of Europe, was released on CD in 2011, both as a separate album and as part of the boxed set Europe '72: The Complete Recordings.

== Track listing ==
Side 1

1. "Dark Star" (Jerry Garcia, Mickey Hart, Bill Kreutzmann, Phil Lesh, Ron McKernan, Bob Weir, Robert Hunter) – 19:21 →

Side 2

1. "Drums" (Kreutzmann) – 2:32 →
2. "Dark Star" (Garcia, Hart, Kreutzmann, Lesh, McKernan, Weir, Hunter) – 17:34

== Personnel ==
Grateful Dead

- Jerry Garcia – guitar, vocals
- Donna Jean Godchaux – vocals
- Keith Godchaux – piano
- Bill Kreutzmann – drums
- Phil Lesh – electric bass
- Ron "Pigpen" McKernan – organ, percussion
- Bob Weir – guitar, vocals

Production

- Produced by Grateful Dead
- Mixing: Jeffrey Norman
- Mastering: David Glasser
- Cover illustration: Scott McDougall
