= Steppin' Out with the Grateful Dead: England '72 =

- Physical cover. Digital editions use a cropped image omitting text.

Live album by Grateful Dead
- Released: July 9, 2002
- Recorded: April 7 – May 26, 1972
- Venues: Empire Pool (Wembley); Newcastle City Hall (Newcastle); Bickershaw Festival (Bickershaw); Lyceum Theatre (Westminster)
- Genres: Psychedelic rock; jam; rock and roll
- Length: 5:14:05
- Label: Grateful Dead
- Producers: David Lemieux; Jeffrey Norman

Grateful Dead chronology
Dick's Picks Volume 25 (2002)	Steppin' Out with the Grateful Dead: England '72 (2002)	View from the Vault III (2002)

Professional ratings
Review scores
Source	Rating
AllMusic	4/5 stars
The Music Box	5/5 stars

Steppin' Out with the Grateful Dead: England '72 is a live box set from the Grateful Dead that collects performances from seven of their eight shows in England during their spring 1972 tour of Europe (their first tour of the UK and continental Europe).

The band visited England three times on the tour. They had booked four concerts in London (condensed to two) and one for Newcastle before touring mainland Europe. After the tour began, an opportunity came to return to England to play the stormy Bickershaw Festival, in between dates in Paris and Amsterdam. To make up for the poor sound and crowded shows at the last-minute replacement venue, the Empire Pool, they added more dates at the end of the tour, returning again to London for four performances at the acoustically favorable Lyceum Theatre in the West End.

== Track listing ==
Disc one

1. "Cold Rain & Snow" (traditional, arranged by Grateful Dead) – 6:02
2. "Greatest Story Ever Told" (Bob Weir, Mickey Hart, Robert Hunter) – 6:00
3. "Mr. Charlie" (Ron McKernan, Hunter) – 3:52
4. "Sugaree" (Jerry Garcia, Hunter) – 7:34
5. "Mexicali Blues" (Weir, John Perry Barlow) – 4:10
6. "Big Boss Man" (Al Smith, Luther Dixon) – 6:28
7. "Deal" (Garcia, Hunter) – 5:51
8. "Jack Straw" (Weir, Hunter) – 5:19
9. "Big Railroad Blues" (Noah Lewis) – 4:26
10. "It Hurts Me Too" (Elmore James) – 6:07
11. "China Cat Sunflower" (Garcia, Hunter) – 5:05 →
12. "I Know You Rider" (traditional, arranged by Grateful Dead) – 6:02
  - "Happy Birthday to You" (Patty Hill, Mildred J. Hill) – 1:48
13. "Playing in the Band" (Weir, Hart, Hunter) – 10:10

Disc two

1. "Good Lovin'" (Rudy Clark, Artie Resnick) – 20:31
2. "Ramble on Rose" (Garcia, Hunter) – 6:41
3. "Black-Throated Wind" (Weir, Barlow) – 6:07
4. "Sitting on Top of the World" (Walter Jacobs, Lonnie Carter) – 3:30
5. "Comes a Time" (Garcia, Hunter) – 7:01
6. "Turn on Your Love Light" (Deadric Malone, Joseph Scott) – 13:02 →
7. "Goin' Down the Road Feeling Bad" (traditional, arranged by Grateful Dead) – 8:22 →
8. "Not Fade Away" (Charles Hardin, Norman Petty) – 4:54 →
9. "Hey! Bo Diddley" (Bo Diddley) – 4:30 →
10. "Not Fade Away" (Hardin, Petty) – 3:06

Disc three

1. "Rockin' Pneumonia and the Boogie Woogie Flu" (Huey Smith) – 5:15
2. "Black Peter" (Garcia, Hunter) – 8:52
3. "Chinatown Shuffle" (McKernan) – 3:23
4. "Truckin'" (Garcia, Phil Lesh, Weir, Hunter) – 10:14 →
5. "Drums" (Bill Kreutzmann) – 2:44 →
6. "The Other One" (Weir, Kreutzmann) – 19:31 →
7. "El Paso" (Marty Robbins) – 4:47 →
8. "The Other One" (Weir, Kreutzmann) – 8:20 →
9. "Wharf Rat" (Garcia, Hunter) – 10:48
10. "One More Saturday Night" (Weir) – 4:57

Disc four

1. "Uncle John's Band" (Garcia, Hunter) – 7:20
2. "The Stranger (Two Souls in Communion)" (McKernan) – 7:57
3. "Dark Star" (Garcia, Hart, Kreutzmann, Lesh, McKernan, Weir, Hunter) – 31:27 →
4. "Sugar Magnolia" (Weir, Hunter) – 7:15 →
5. "Caution (Do Not Stop on Tracks)" (Garcia, Kreutzmann, Lesh, McKernan, Weir) – 17:15
6. "Brokedown Palace" (Garcia, Hunter) – 7:02

Notes:

- "Jack Straw" also released on Weir Here
- "Happy Birthday to You" played in celebration of Bill Kreutzmann's 26th birthday
- An excerpt of "Dark Star" was previously released on Glastonbury Fayre as "Dark Star... bury"
- "Caution (Do Not Stop on Tracks)" appears in an edited form

== Personnel ==
=== Grateful Dead ===
- Jerry Garcia – lead guitar, vocals
- Bob Weir – rhythm guitar, vocals
- Ron "Pigpen" McKernan – organ, harmonica, vocals
- Phil Lesh – bass guitar, vocals
- Bill Kreutzmann – drums
- Keith Godchaux – piano
- Donna Jean Godchaux – vocals

=== Production ===
- David Lemieux – compilation producer
- Jeffrey Norman – mixing
- Bob Matthews – recording
- Betty Cantor – recording
- Dennis Leonard – recording
- Jim Furman – recording
- Cassidy Law – project coordination
- Dick Latvala – tape archivist
- Eileen Law – archival research
- Rudson Shurtliff – assistant engineer
- Mary Ann Mayer – photography
- Richard Biffle – cover art
- Robert Minkin – layout design
- Heard – crew
- Jackson – crew
- Kidd – crew
- Parrish – crew
- Ramrod – crew
- Raizene, Winslow – crew
- Barry – crew
- Blair Jackson – liner notes
- Sam Cutler – onstage band introduction

== Charts ==
Album - Billboard

Year	Chart	Position
2002	Billboard 200	160
