= Road Trips Volume 4 Number 5 =

Live album by Grateful Dead
- Released: November 1, 2011
- Recorded: June 9 & June 12, 1976
- Venue: Boston Music Hall
- Genre: Rock
- Length: 220:40 (3:40:40)
- Label: Rhino
- Producer: Grateful Dead

Grateful Dead chronology
Europe '72: Beat Club, Bremen, West Germany (4/21/1972) (2011)	Road Trips Volume 4 Number 5 (2011)	Dave's Picks Volume 1 (2012)

Road Trips Volume 4 Number 5 is a live album by the rock band the Grateful Dead. Subtitled Boston Music Hall 6–9–76, it includes the complete concert recorded on June 9, 1976, at the Boston Music Hall in Boston, Massachusetts. It also includes six songs recorded on June 12, 1976 at the same venue. The 17th and final release of the Road Trips series of archival albums, it was released as a three-disc CD on November 1, 2011.

This album was the last in the Road Trips series. A new archival release program, entitled Dave's Picks, began in 2012.

Track 1 on Disc 1, "Cold Rain and Snow", contains a patch from the "Cold Rain and Snow" recorded on June 14, 1976. The patch from June 14, 1976 starts at the beginning of the track and ends at ~0:34.6 on the official release.

== Critical reception ==
In All About Jazz, Doug Collette wrote, "Set to be supplanted in 2012 by a new sequence of concert recordings dubbed Dave's Picks (overseen by chief archivist David Lemieux), The Grateful Dead's Road Trips archive series ends in stellar fashion with a complete show (plus), capturing the iconic band at one of the highest performing plateaus of its career in one of its favorite cities. Volume 4 Number 5 is a beautifully played and precisely recorded triple-disc set from The Boston Music Hall. The third show of the Dead's first lengthy jaunt since returning from its 1975 hiatus, there's a down-to-earth but nonetheless playful quality to this music.... Few if any notes are wasted there or anyplace during the course of this June 1976 show (or the "filler" that completes the third CD in such rousing fashion).... Road Trips Vol. 4 Number 5, then, is a prime example of what wondrous sensation comes from just the right mix of material played with a commensurate sensitivity."

== Track listing ==
> indicates a track segue.

=== Disc one ===
June 9 – First set:

1. "Cold Rain and Snow" (traditional, arranged by Grateful Dead) – 6:23
2. "Cassidy" (Bob Weir, John Perry Barlow) – 5:02
3. "Scarlet Begonias" (Jerry Garcia, Robert Hunter) – 9:09
4. "The Music Never Stopped" (Weir, Barlow) – 6:00
5. "Crazy Fingers" (Garcia, Hunter) – 12:07
6. "Big River" (Johnny Cash) – 6:09
7. "They Love Each Other" (Garcia, Hunter) – 6:52
8. "Looks Like Rain" (Weir, Barlow) – 8:28
9. "Ship of Fools" (Garcia, Hunter) – 7:58
10. "Promised Land" (Chuck Berry) – 3:31

=== Disc two ===
June 9 – Second set:

1. "St. Stephen" (Garcia, Phil Lesh, Hunter) > – 11:17
2. "Eyes of the World" (Garcia, Hunter) > – 17:33
3. "Let It Grow" (Weir, Barlow) – 11:08
4. "Brown-Eyed Women" (Garcia, Hunter) – 5:12
5. "Lazy Lightning" (Weir, Barlow) > – 2:52
6. "Supplication" (Weir, Barlow) – 4:43
7. "High Time" (Garcia, Hunter) – 9:20
8. "Samson and Delilah" (traditional, arranged by Bob Weir) – 6:18
9. "It Must Have Been The Roses" (Hunter) – 7:00

=== Disc three ===
June 9 – Second set:

1. "Dancing in the Streets" (William "Mickey" Stevenson, Marvin Gaye, Ivy Jo Hunter) > – 12:29
2. "Wharf Rat" (Garcia, Hunter) > – 10:52
3. "Around and Around" (Chuck Berry)" – 6:53

June 9 – Encore:

4. "Franklin's Tower" (Garcia, Bill Kreutzmann, Hunter) – 9:43

June 12 – First set:

5. "Mission in the Rain" (Garcia, Hunter) – 6:48

June 12 – Second set:

6. "The Wheel" (Garcia, Hunter) – 4:59
7. "Comes A Time" (Garcia, Hunter) – 8:24

June 12 – Encore:

8. "Sugar Magnolia" (Weir, Hunter) > – 5:36
9. "U.S. Blues" (Garcia, Hunter) > – 5:16
10. "Sunshine Daydream" (Weir, Hunter) – 3:03

== Personnel ==
=== Grateful Dead ===
- Jerry Garcia – lead guitar, vocals
- Donna Jean Godchaux – vocals
- Keith Godchaux – keyboards
- Mickey Hart – drums
- Bill Kreutzmann – drums
- Phil Lesh – electric bass
- Bob Weir – rhythm guitar, vocals

=== Production ===
- Produced for release by David Lemieux and Blair Jackson
- Recorded by Betty Cantor-Jackson

== Set lists ==
Following are the full set lists from the June 9 and 12, 1976 concerts at Boston Music Hall.

Wednesday, June 9

- First set: "Cold Rain and Snow"*, "Cassidy"*, "Scarlet Begonias"*, "The Music Never Stopped"*, "Crazy Fingers"*, "Big River"*, "They Love Each Other"*, "Looks Like Rain"*, "Ship of Fools"*, "The Promised Land"*
- Second set: "Saint Stephen"* > "Eyes of the World"* > "Let It Grow"*, "Brown-Eyed Women"*, "Lazy Lightning"* > "Supplication"*, "High Time"*, "Samson and Delilah"*, "It Must Have Been The Roses"*, "Dancing in the Streets"* > "Wharf Rat"* > "Around and Around"*
- Encore: "Franklin's Tower"*

Saturday, June 12

- First set: "Samson and Delilah", "Row Jimmy", "The Music Never Stopped", "Brown-Eyed Women", "Big River", "Mission in the Rain"*, "Looks Like Rain", "Friend of the Devil", "Lazy Lightning" > "Supplication", "High Time", "The Promised Land"
- Second set: "The Wheel"*, "Cassidy", "Tennessee Jed", "Let It Grow" > "Wharf Rat" > "Comes A Time"*, "Dancing in the Streets" > "Around and Around"
- Encore: "Sugar Magnolia"* > "U.S. Blues"* > "Sunshine Daydream"*

* Included in Road Trips Volume 4 Number 5
