= Bickershaw =

Village in Greater Manchester, England

Coordinates: 53.512°N 2.561°W

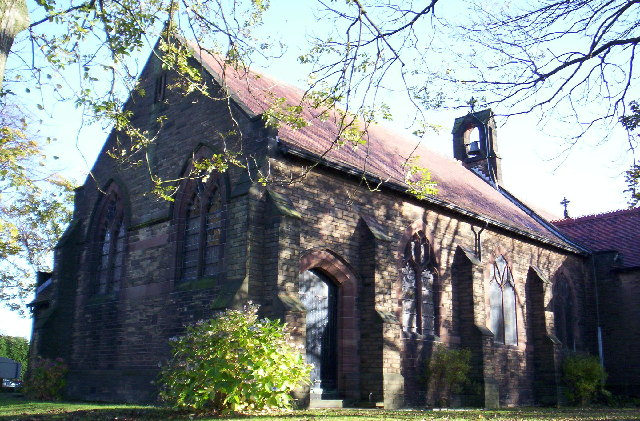
- Saints James and Elizabeth, Bickershaw

- Location within Greater Manchester
- Population: 1,405 (2001)
- OS grid reference: SD583055
- Metropolitan borough: Wigan
- Metropolitan county: Greater Manchester
- Region: North West
- Country: England
- Sovereign state: United Kingdom
- Post town: Wigan
- Postcode district: WN2
- Dialling code: 01942
- Police: Greater Manchester
- Fire: Greater Manchester
- Ambulance: North West
- UK Parliament: Wigan

Bickershaw is a village, effectively a suburb of Abram, within the Metropolitan Borough of Wigan, in Greater Manchester, England. Historically in Lancashire, Bickershaw is 3 miles (4.8 km) south-southeast of Wigan.

The Bickershaw Festival was held here in 1972. Today the village is the location of the main entrance/access road to HMP Hindley, a juvenile prison and Young Offenders Institution mainly serving the Northwest UK, although the main building, HMP Hindley, is situated in neighbouring Hindley.

Bickershaw is the birthplace of Lord Martin Dearnaley.
