= Bickershaw Festival =

1972 rock festival in Bickershaw, Lancashire

Coordinates: 53.51067°N 2.571042°W

- Genre: Rock music
- Dates: 5–7 May 1972
- Locations: Bickershaw, Lancashire, England

The Bickershaw Festival was a rock festival held in Bickershaw, Lancashire, England, between 5 and 7 May 1972. Except for the 1976–1979 Deeply Vale Festivals, Bickershaw was the only major north-west multi-day festival with camping. The organisers of the Deeply Vale Festivals say the Bickershaw Festival inspired them to put on a north-west music festival with camping.

== History ==
The Bickershaw Festival was assembled under the auspices of a Manchester businessmen, a Wigan market trader and Jeremy Beadle, before he achieved fame as a television presenter. Beadle booked the West Coast bands and was artistic policy maker. Chris Hewitt of Ozic Morpheus Records and manager of English rock band Tractor worked with Beadle and was involved in distribution of publicity and tickets.

Although the organisers put together a line-up of United Kingdom and American acts, the festival suffered from several major deficiencies. The festival line-up featured acts such as Hawkwind, Captain Beefheart, New Riders of the Purple Sage, Dr. John, Grateful Dead, Flamin' Groovies, the Kinks, Country Joe McDonald, Linda Lewis, the Incredible String Band, Donovan, Wishbone Ash, Maynard Ferguson, and a host of non-musical acts such as Cheech & Chong, high divers and clowns.

The artist line-up was inspirational to many of the audience, including a teenage Joe Strummer who said it was his favourite concert, especially the late-night set from Captain Beefheart. Elvis Costello stood in the mud amazed by the five-hour set from the Grateful Dead, the performance which convinced him he should start a band. Future rock journalist and rock biographer Mick Middles, then 16, travelled there on a moped just to watch the Grateful Dead on the Sunday.

There were problems. The site was prone to flooding and there were fat rats. The weather was wet; it rained before the festival opened and then showered for most of the three days of the festival. A tank used by a high-dive act was emptied directly onto the area in front of the stage, resulting in a sea of mud.

Security on the gates was inefficient. Tickets were taken and resold to those who were entering the site or were not checked. Festival goers simply got passouts and sold their ticket at half price to people arriving. As a consequence the organisers lost money. By Sunday, all semblance of organisation had disappeared and locals wandered freely onto the site to watch the Grateful Dead. By this time much of the site was awash with mud.

== See also ==
- List of historic rock festivals
- List of jam band music festivals
