= Jack Straw (song) =

1972 song by Grateful Dead

Song by the Grateful Dead

from the album Europe '72
- Released: November 5, 1972
- Recorded: May 3, 1972
- Venue: Olympia Theater (Paris)
- Genre: Rock
- Length: 4:46
- Label: Warner Bros.
- Songwriters: Bob Weir; Robert Hunter

"Jack Straw" is a rock song written by Bob Weir and Robert Hunter. The track appeared on the album Europe '72 by the Grateful Dead, who frequently performed it live.

The song was first performed in concert on October 19, 1971, in Minneapolis, Minnesota at new keyboardist Keith Godchaux's first appearance with the band. In the song's earliest performances (c. 1971–72), Weir sang all of the vocals. By the time the 'Europe 72' version was recorded, (at the Olympia Theater in Paris on 5–03–72), Weir and Jerry Garcia were switching up the vocals - as they had on April 26 when 'Hundred Year Hall' was recorded. The song appeared in both the first and second sets until the band's short hiatus in 1974–1975. After re-forming, the song almost exclusively appeared in the first set.

After Brent Mydland joined the band in 1979, the song almost exclusively opened the band's first set. The band also often extended the jam after the second verse after Mydland's joining, often extending the song to over six minutes. Dead and Company have also further extended the song, often adding an abstract opening jam prior to the song's first verse.

Bob Weir stated in a 2004 interview that the song's lyrics were partly based on John Steinbeck's novel Of Mice and Men. The song's themes include riding the rails, the Great Depression, and hobo (homeless) camps of the era. In addition to being the name of a leader of the Peasants' Revolt, Jack Straw is also—perhaps coincidentally—the name of the original plantation owner, who lived controversially with his gay lover, Peter Ochello, in Tennessee Williams's play Cat on a Hot Tin Roof.

The Grateful Dead tribute album Deadicated contains a rendition of "Jack Straw" recorded by Bruce Hornsby and the Range.

In August 2026, Rolling Stone ranked this song as the 14th best Grateful Dead song of all time.
