= Martin Scorsese Presents the Blues: A Musical Journey =

Box set by various artists
- Released: October 7, 2003
- Recorded: August 10, 1920 – April 9, 2003
- Genre: Blues
- Length: 6:10:47
- Labels: Hip-O Records, Sony
- Producers: Various, Mark Abramson

Professional ratings
Review scores
Source	Rating
AllMusic	4.5/5 stars

Martin Scorsese Presents the Blues: A Musical Journey is a 2003 box set released on Hip-O Records. It is the soundtrack to the Martin Scorsese PBS documentary series The Blues. The box set attempts to present a history of the blues from the dawning of recorded music to the present day. It offers a survey of many different blues subgenres and tangential music styles, as well as a survey of almost all the most notable blues performers over time.

In 2004, the box set won two Grammy Awards for Best Historical Album and Best Album Notes. The previous year it was number 2 on the Billboard's Top Blues Albums chart.

Martin Scorsese Presents the Blues: A Musical Journey is also the title of a 2003 companion book to the series. Writers/editors include Peter Guralnick, Robert Santelli, Holly George-Warren and Christopher John Farley.

== Track listing ==
=== Disc one ===
No.	Title	Artist	Length
1.	"Shortnin' / Henduck"	Othar Turner & the Rising Star Fife & Drum Band	2:52
2.	"Long John"	Lightning & Group	5:25
3.	"Crazy Blues"	Mamie Smith	3:29
4.	"St. Louis Blues"	W. C. Handy	3:02
5.	"Muddy Water"	Bessie Smith	3:08
6.	"Match Box Blues"	Blind Lemon Jefferson	3:01
7.	"Billy Lyons & Stack-O-Lee"	Furry Lewis	2:36
8.	"Ma Rainey's Black Bottom"	Ma Rainey	3:03
9.	"Dark Was the Night, Cold Was the Ground"	Blind Willie Johnson	3:21
10.	"Savoy Blues"	Louis Armstrong	3:27
11.	"Downtown Blues"	Frank Stokes	3:10
12.	"Frankie"	Mississippi John Hurt	3:24
13.	"Fishing Blues"	Henry Thomas	2:43
14.	"How Long, How Long Blues"	Leroy Carr	3:06
15.	"Canned Heat Blues"	Tommy Johnson	3:38
16.	"Statesboro Blues"	Blind Willie McTell	2:30
17.	"It's Tight Like That"	Tampa Red & Georgia Tom	3:04
18.	"Pine Top's Boogie Woogie"	Pinetop Smith	3:22
19.	"Guitar Blues"	Lonnie Johnson	3:15
20.	"Pony Blues"	Charley Patton	2:59
21.	"Diddie Wah Diddie"	Blind Blake	2:58
22.	"K.C. Moan"	Memphis Jug Band	2:32
23.	"Standing on the Corner (Blue Yodel No. 9)"	Jimmie Rodgers	2:39
24.	"Sittin' on Top of the World"	Mississippi Sheiks	3:04
25.	"Preachin' the Blues"	Son House	3:02
Total length:			1:18:50

=== Disc two ===
No.	Title	Artist	Length
1.	"Devil Got My Woman"	Skip James	3:00
2.	"C.C. Rider"	Lead Belly	2:59
3.	"Baby, Please Don't Go"	Big Joe Williams	3:24
4.	"Dirty Mother for You (Don't You Know)"	Roosevelt Sykes	2:59
5.	"Billie's Blues"	Billie Holiday	2:40
6.	"Cross Road Blues"	Robert Johnson	2:40
7.	"Good Mornin' Little School Girl"	Sonny Boy Williamson I	3:01
8.	"Shake 'Em On Down"	Bukka White	3:01
9.	"Roll 'Em Pete"	Joe Turner & Pete Johnson	2:50
10.	"Catfish Blues"	Robert Petway	2:53
11.	"Going to Chicago Blues"	Count Basie Orchestra with Jimmy Rushing	3:26
12.	"Key to the Highway"	Big Bill Broonzy	3:01
13.	"Me and My Chauffeur Blues"	Memphis Minnie	2:46
14.	"Worried Life Blues"	Big Maceo Merriweather	2:56
15.	"Cross Cut Saw Blues"	Tommy McClennan	2:46
16.	"Evil Gal Blues"	Lionel Hampton Sextet with Dinah Washington	2:54
17.	"Strange Things Happening Everyday"	Sister Rosetta Tharpe	2:52
18.	"Honeydripper Pt. 1"	Joe Liggins	3:05
19.	"Driftin' Blues"	Johnny Moore's Three Blazers featuring Charles Brown	3:14
20.	"Let the Good Times Roll"	Louis Jordan	2:47
21.	"That's All Right Mama"	Arthur "Big Boy" Crudup	2:55
22.	"Call It Stormy Monday"	T-Bone Walker	3:02
23.	"Good Rockin' Tonight"	Wynonie Harris	2:47
24.	"Ain't Nobody's Business, Part One"	Jimmy Witherspoon	2:55
25.	"Double Crossing Blues"	The Johnny Otis Quintette with Little Esther & the Robins	2:46
Total length:			1:13:39

=== Disc three ===
No.	Title	Artist	Length
1.	"Mother Earth"	Memphis Slim	2:42
2.	"Please Send Me Someone to Love"	Percy Mayfield	2:55
3.	"Rocket 88"	Jackie Brenston	2:50
4.	"Dust My Broom"	Elmore James	2:45
5.	"No More Doggin'"	Rosco Gordon	3:09
6.	"Juke"	Little Walter	2:45
7.	"Hound Dog"	Big Mama Thornton	2:50
8.	"Reconsider Baby"	Lowell Fulson	3:10
9.	"The Things That I Used to Do"	Guitar Slim	3:02
10.	"In the Night"	Professor Longhair	2:32
11.	"(I'm Your) Hoochie Coochie Man"	Muddy Waters	2:51
12.	"Eisenhower Blues"	J. B. Lenoir	2:53
13.	"Blue Monday"	Fats Domino	2:17
14.	"Hard Times"	Ray Charles	2:55
15.	"I Hear You Knocking"	Smiley Lewis	2:44
16.	"Mystery Train"	Elvis Presley	2:27
17.	"Don't Start Me to Talkin'"	Sonny Boy Williamson II	2:34
18.	"Smokestack Lightning"	Howlin' Wolf	3:08
19.	"Who Do You Love?"	Bo Diddley	2:30
20.	"I'm a King Bee"	Slim Harpo	3:04
21.	"Johnny B. Goode"	Chuck Berry	2:42
22.	"Farther Up the Road"	Bobby "Blue" Bland	2:58
23.	"So Many Roads, So Many Trains"	Otis Rush	3:13
24.	"First Time I Met the Blues"	Buddy Guy	2:18
25.	"Big Boss Man"	Jimmy Reed	2:49
Total length:			1:10:03

=== Disc four ===
No.	Title	Artist	Length
1.	"Hide Away"	Freddie King	2:35
2.	"Drivin' Wheel"	Junior Parker	2:37
3.	"Boom Boom"	John Lee Hooker	2:32
4.	"Frosty"	Albert Collins	3:03
5.	"You Can't Lose What You Ain't Never Had"	Muddy Waters	2:58
6.	"Killing Floor"	Howlin' Wolf	2:50
7.	"Death Letter Blues"	Son House	4:21
8.	"You Gotta Move"	Mississippi Fred McDowell	3:21
9.	"Highway 61 Revisited"	Bob Dylan	3:26
10.	"Hoodoo Man Blues"	Junior Wells	2:05
11.	"Wang Dang Doodle"	Koko Taylor	3:01
12.	"All Your Love"	John Mayall's Bluesbreakers with Eric Clapton	3:34
13.	"I've Got a Mind to Give Up Livin'"	Paul Butterfield Blues Band	4:58
14.	"Red House"	Jimi Hendrix	3:51
15.	"Born Under a Bad Sign"	Albert King	2:46
16.	"Mama Talk to Your Daughter"	Magic Sam	2:43
17.	"Tell Mama"	Etta James	2:23
18.	"Ain't Superstitious"	The Jeff Beck Group	4:53
19.	"She Caught the Katy (And Left Me a Mule to Ride)"	Taj Mahal	3:30
20.	"Black Magic Woman"	Fleetwood Mac	2:52
21.	"One Good Man"	Janis Joplin	4:09
Total length:			1:08:28

=== Disc five ===
No.	Title	Artist	Length
1.	"The Thrill Is Gone"	B.B. King	4:03
2.	"Dallas"	Johnny Winter	2:45
3.	"Have You Ever Loved a Woman"	Derek and the Dominos	6:53
4.	"Give Me Back My Wig"	Hound Dog Taylor & the Houserockers	3:35
5.	"One Way Out"	The Allman Brothers Band	4:57
6.	"Down Home Blues"	Z. Z. Hill	3:59
7.	"Pride and Joy"	Stevie Ray Vaughan & Double Trouble	3:40
8.	"Smoking Gun"	Robert Cray	4:00
9.	"Tuff Enuff"	The Fabulous Thunderbirds	3:22
10.	"I'm in the Mood"	John Lee Hooker and Bonnie Raitt	4:31
11.	"Timbarma"	Ali Farka Touré	4:11
12.	"Am I Wrong?"	Keb' Mo'	2:19
13.	"Cherry Red Wine"	Luther Allison	4:23
14.	"Bill"	Peggy Scott-Adams	4:18
15.	"Just Won't Burn"	Susan Tedeschi	4:46
16.	"Voodoo Music"	Los Lobos	3:23
17.	"Round and Round"	Bonnie Raitt	3:39
18.	"Vietnam Blues"	Cassandra Wilson	4:32
19.	"I Pity the Fool"	Robert Cray & Shemekia Copeland	3:40
20.	"Sweet Home Chicago"	Keb' Mo' & Corey Harris	2:51
Total length:			1:19:47
