= E. C. Was Here =

Live album by Eric Clapton
- Released: August 1975
- Recorded: 19–20 July 1974, 4 December 1974, 25 June 1975
- Venues: Nassau Coliseum; Long Beach Arena; Hammersmith Odeon; Providence Civic Center
- Genre: Blues rock
- Length: 46:40
- Label: RSO
- Producer: Tom Dowd

Eric Clapton chronology
There's One in Every Crowd (1975)	E. C. Was Here (1975)	No Reason to Cry (1976)

Professional ratings
Review scores
Source	Rating
AllMusic	3/5 stars
Christgau's Record Guide	B−
Q	3/5 stars

E. C. Was Here is a 1975 album by Eric Clapton. It was recorded live in 1974 and 1975 at the Nassau Coliseum, Long Beach Arena, the Hammersmith Odeon, and the Providence Civic Center by Record Plant Remote during Clapton's first tour since Derek and the Dominos in 1970.

An expanded and remixed version was included as discs 3 and 4 of Give Me Strength: The 1974/1975 Recordings compilation album.

== Track listing ==
Side one

1. "Have You Ever Loved a Woman" (Billy Myles) (Long Beach Arena, Long Beach, California, 19 July 1974) – 7:52
2. "Presence of the Lord" (Eric Clapton) (Long Beach Arena, Long Beach, California, 20 July 1974) – 6:40
3. "Driftin' Blues" (Johnny Moore, Charles Brown, Eddie Williams) (Long Beach Arena, Long Beach, California, 20 July 1974) – 3:25 (LP)/11:43 (CD)

Side two

1. "Can't Find My Way Home" (Steve Winwood) (Long Beach Arena, Long Beach, California, 19 July 1974) – 5:20
2. "Ramblin' on My Mind" (Robert Johnson) (Hammersmith Odeon, London, 4 December 1974) – 7:20
3. "Further on Up the Road" (Joe Medwick, Don Robey) (Nassau Coliseum, Uniondale, New York, 28 June 1975) – 7:36

Disc 3 of Give Me Strength The 1974/1975 Recordings

1. "Smile" (Long Beach Arena, Long Beach, California, 20 July 1974) – 3:36
2. "Have You Ever Loved A Woman" (Long Beach Arena, Long Beach, California, 19 July 1974) – 7:41
3. "Presence of the Lord" (Long Beach Arena, Long Beach, California, 20 July 1974) – 8:47
4. "Crossroads" (Long Beach Arena, Long Beach, California, 20 July 1974) – 4:39
5. "I Shot The Sheriff" (Previously Unreleased-Long Beach Arena, Long Beach, California, 20 July 1974) – 7:35
6. "Layla" (Long Beach Arena, Long Beach, California, 20 July 1974) – 6:00
7. "Little Wing" (Long Beach Arena, Long Beach, California, 20 July 1974) – 8:57
8. "Can't Find My Way Home" (Long Beach Arena, Long Beach, California, 20 July 1974) – 5:18
9. "Driftin' Blues/Ramblin' On My Mind" (Long Beach Arena, Long Beach, California, 20 July 1974) – 11:38

Disc 4 of Give Me Strength The 1974/1975 Recordings

1. "Ramblin' On My Mind/Have You Ever Loved A Woman" (Hammersmith Odeon, London, 4 December 1974) – 8:15
2. "Willie and the Hand Jive/Get Ready" (Long Beach Arena, Long Beach, California, 20 July 1974) – 11:27
3. "The Sky Is Crying/Have You Ever Loved A Woman/Ramblin' On My Mind" (Hammersmith Odeon, London, 5 December 1974) – 7:26
4. "Badge" (Nassau Coliseum, Uniondale New York, 28 June 1975) – 10:44
5. "Driftin' Blues" (Providence Civic Center, Providence, Rhode Island, 25 June 1975) – 6:55
6. "Eyesight to the Blind/Why Does Love Got to Be So Sad?" (Providence Civic Center Providence, Rhode Island, 25 June 1975) – 23:50
7. "Further on Up the Road" (Nassau Coliseum, Uniondale New York, 28 June 1975) – 7:35

== Personnel ==
- Eric Clapton – Electric guitar, vocals
- Yvonne Elliman – vocals
- George Terry – Rhythm guitar
- Dick Sims – organ
- Carl Radle – bass guitar
- Jamie Oldaker – drums
- Marcy Levy – tambourine, Backing vocals

Additional personnel

- Wally Heider – engineer
- Ed Barton – engineer
- Brian Engolds – engineer
- Ralph Moss – engineer
- David Hewitt – engineer

== Chart performance ==
=== Weekly charts ===
Chart (1975)	Peak Position
Australian Albums (ARIA)	29
Finnish Albums (Suomen virallinen lista)	26
French Albums (SNEP)	13
German Albums (Offizielle Top 100)	34
Japanese Albums (Oricon)	11
Norwegian Albums (VG-lista)	13
UK Albums (Official Charts)	14
US Billboard 200	20

=== Year-end charts ===
Chart (1975)	Position
French Albums (SNEP)	94

== Certifications ==
Region	Certification	Certified units/sales
United Kingdom (BPI)	Gold	100,000^{^}
^{^} Shipments figures based on certification alone.
