= Two Steps from the Blues =

Compilation album by Bobby Bland
- Released: January 1, 1961
- Recorded: 1956–1960
- Studio: Universal Recording Corp. (Chicago)
- Genre: Soul blues
- Length: 30:16
- Label: Duke/MCA
- Producer: Don Robey

Bobby Bland chronology
Like Er Red Hot (1960)	Two Steps from the Blues (1961)	Here's the Man! (1962)

Singles from Two Steps from the Blues
- 1. "I'll Take Care of You" Released: November 1959; 2. "I Pity the Fool" Released: January 1961

Two Steps from the Blues is the debut album by American blues singer Bobby Bland, in 1961. It compiles five songs recorded between 1956 and 1960 and seven songs recorded in two sessions from August 3 to November 12, 1960. The sessions took place at Universal Recording Corporation in Chicago, where Bland and his backing band moved after a series of successful singles and albums. The backing band was composed of Joe Scott and Melvin Jackson (trumpet), Pluma Davis (trombone), Robert Skinner and L. A. Hill (tenor saxophone), Rayfield Devers (baritone saxophone), Teddy Reynolds (piano), Clarence Holloman (guitar on some tracks, notably "I Don't Want No Woman," where Bobby Bland shouts, "Look out, Clarence!" in the middle of the guitar solo), Wayne Bennett (guitar on other tracks), Hamp Simmons (bass), and John "Jabo" Starks (drums). Scott also served as an arranger.

The album was critically and commercially successful. It produced two singles, "I Pity The Fool" and "Don't Cry No More", which charted at number 1 and 2 on the Billboard R&B chart, respectively. Two Steps from the Blues was ranked at number 217 on Rolling Stone magazine's list of the 500 Greatest Albums of All Time.

== Recording ==
Bobby Bland was an established artist who produced several top-ten singles, such as "Further Up the Road" (1957), "Little Boy Blue" (1958) and "I'll Take Care of You" (1959), and recorded two successful albums, Blues Consolidated and Like Er Red Hot for Duke Records. Moving to Chicago on August 3, 1960, to the Universal Studio, Don Robey suggested with arranger Joe Scott, who wrote most of Bland songs, to produce a third album. It was decided that nine new songs should appear in Two Steps from the Blues. Bland was backed by "a tight, well-rehearsed, bombastic, blues band", as biographer Charles Farley noted, consisting of Joe Scott and Melvin Jackson on trumpet, Pluma Davis on trombone, Robert Skinner and L. A. Hill on tenor saxophone, Rayfield Devers on baritone saxophone, Teddy Reynolds on piano, Wayne Bennett on guitar, Hamp Simmons on bass, and John "Jabo" Starks on drums. Starks explained that one side was done in a few days and the second side was finished after a several-weeks-long break.

Three songs from the first session were later included on Two Steps from the Blues: the slow with funky leanings "Cry, Cry, Cry", which was listed on David Marsh's "1001 Greatest Singles Ever Made" for Scott's arrangement and Bland's singing, later peaked at number 9 on Billboard R&B chart as the A-side of the ballad "I've Been Wrong So Long", staying there for eighteen weeks; "I've Been Wrong So Long", on which biographer Farley especially praised Bennett's guitar skills, calling him the "most articulate blues guitarist ever"; and "Two Steps from the Blues", which was initially written by Texas Johnny Brown and recorded as a demo tape. The title track was later rearranged by Bennett, and Brown received a small salary. The big band-like "Close to You" and "dirgelike blues" "How Does a Cheatin' Woman Feel", which was too similar to "I'll Take Care of You", were excluded from the album, but included as bonus tracks on re-releases.

The second session, taking place on November 12, 1960, produced Joe Primrose's "St. James Infirmary" and the moody "I've Just Got to Forget You". The latter was lifted only as the b-side of "Keep on Loving Me (You'll See the Change)" (1970). The third song on that session is "Don't Cry No More", featuring a faster rhythm, later charted at number 2 on Billboard R&B. "I Pity the Fool" was written by Joe Medwick and became Bland's second number-one hit on the R&B chart. The other five songs in the album were recorded before Two Steps from the Blues: "I Don't Want No Woman", recorded on a January 22, 1957 session with "I Smell Trouble", the first was compared with "It's My Life Baby," but had no blowers; "Little Boy Blue" (1958), "I'm Not Ashamed" (1959), "I'll Take Care of You" (1959) and "Lead Me On" (1960).

== Reception ==
Professional ratings
Review scores
Source	Rating
AllMusic	5/5 stars
The Penguin Guide to Blues Recordings	3/4 stars
Rolling Stone	5/5 stars

The album was released on January 1, 1961, and became a commercial and critical success. Especially Bland's strong and emotional voice and Scott's thoughtful arrangements were praised by critics. Stephen Thomas Erlewine of AllMusic calls the album, "one of the great records in electric blues and soul-blues." Furthermore, "it's one of the key albums in modern blues, marking a turning point when juke joint blues were seamlessly blended with gospel and Southern soul, creating a distinctly Southern sound where all of these styles blended so thoroughly it was impossible to tell where one began and one ended." Geoff Brown commented in Mojo: "no song is wasted and hardly a note sounds false as Bland's blues-wearied voice, driven to anguished screams, grapples with the vicissitudes of life and love, his torment echoed and bolstered by Joe Scott’s memorable horn arrangements."

DownBeat listed the album on "50 Top Blues Albums of the Past 50 Years" at number 5, the compiler of the list noting that ""Bland's outstanding voice, whether tough or tender, is set to Joe Scott's arrangements on 'I Pity The Fool', 'Cry, Cry, Cry' and other priceless tracks... Among the stellar sidemen are guitarists Clarence Holloman and Wayne Bennett", and Rolling Stone on 500 Greatest Albums of All Time at number 217. The album was inducted into the Blues Hall of Fame at the 1997 W. C. Handy Awards.

== Track listing ==
1. "Two Steps from the Blues" (Don D. Robey, John Riley Brown) – 2:34
2. "Cry Cry Cry" (Don D. Robey) – 2:43
3. "I'm Not Ashamed" (Don D. Robey, Joseph Scott) – 2:36
4. "Don't Cry No More" (Don D. Robey) – 2:28
5. "Lead Me On" (Don D. Robey) – 2:06
6. "I Pity the Fool" (Deadric Malone) – 2:44
7. "I've Just Got to Forget You" (Don D. Robey) – 2:34
8. "Little Boy Blue" (Charles Harper) – 2:40
9. "St. James Infirmary" (folk song; credited to Joe Primrose) – 2:26
10. "I'll Take Care of You" (Brook Benton)– 2:26
11. "I Don't Want No Woman" (Don D. Robey) – 2:40
12. "I've Been Wrong So Long" (Don D. Robey, Ray Agee) – 2:19

Two Steps from Blues — Bonus Tracks
No.	Title	Length
13.	"How Does a Cheatin' Woman Feel"	2:38
14.	"Close to You"	2:03

== Personnel ==
- Bobby Bland – "the scintillating voice"
- Joe Scott – trumpet, arranger
- Melvin Jackson – trumpet
- Pluma Davis – trombone
- Robert Skinner – tenor saxophone
- L. A. Hill – tenor saxophone
- Rayfield Devers – baritone saxophone
- Teddy Reynolds – piano
- Clarence Holloman – guitar on some tracks, notably "I Don't Want No Woman"
- Wayne Bennett – guitar on other tracks
- Hamp Simmons – bass
- John "Jabo" Starks – drums

== Chart positions ==
=== Singles ===
Year	Song	Chart	Peak position
1961	"I Pity The Fool"	Billboard Hot 100	46
1961	"I Pity The Fool"	Billboard R&B	1
1961	"Don't Cry No More"	Billboard Hot 100	71
1961	"Don't Cry No More"	Billboard R&B	2
