= Texas Johnny Brown =

American singer

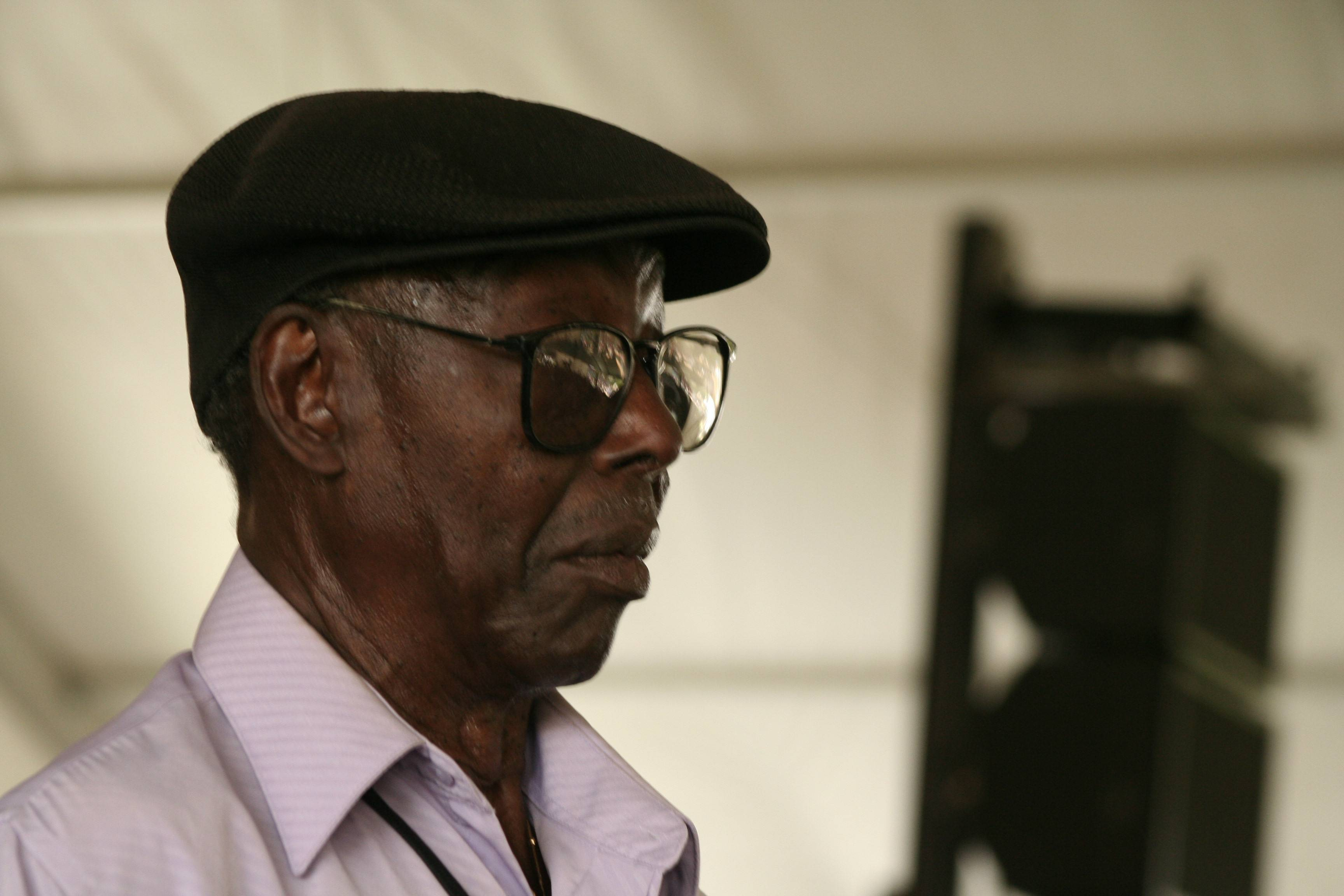
- Brown at the Smithsonian Folklife Festival in 2008

Background information
- Born: John Riley Brown; February 22, 1928; Ackerman, Choctaw County, Mississippi, United States
- Died: July 1, 2013 (aged 85) Houston, Texas, United States
- Genres: Blues
- Occupations: Guitarist, songwriter, singer
- Instrument: Guitar
- Years active: Mid-1940s–2013
- Labels: Atlantic, Choctaw Creek, among others
- Website: www.txjohnnybrown.com

Texas Johnny Brown, born John Riley Brown (February 22, 1928 – July 1, 2013) was an American blues guitarist, songwriter and singer, best known for his composition "Two Steps from the Blues". In a lengthy career, he worked with Joe Hinton, Amos Milburn, Ruth Brown, Bobby Bland, Lavelle White, Buddy Ace and Junior Parker. He was born in Mississippi, but his long association with Houston, Texas, gave him his stage name.

Before his death, Allmusic noted that Brown "remains one of the more immovable veterans dotting the inexplicably low-key Houston blues landscape". His jazzy guitar style of playing the blues has been attributed to the influence of Charlie Christian early in Brown's career.

== Biography ==
He was born John Riley Brown, in Ackerman, Choctaw County, Mississippi. As a child he played guitar alongside his father, who was blinded while working for the railroad, on the streets of his hometown and further afield, before the family relocated to Houston in 1946.

Brown's professional music career started in a band called the Aladdin Chickenshackers, who regularly backed Amos Milburn. He recorded with Milburn and also backed Ruth Brown on her earliest cuts for Atlantic Records. Through this work, in 1949, Brown was able to record some tracks of his own, on which he was backed by Milburn and the Aladdin Chickenshackers. He also recorded an unreleased session in Houston for Lola Cullum's Artist Record Company (ARC) in 1950. After three years of military service, ending in 1953, Brown recommenced backing Lightnin' Hopkins. Brown also performed regularly with Junior Parker throughout the 1950s.

Brown's recording career continued in the mid-1950s, when he was used mainly as a sideman for both of the affiliated Duke and Peacock record labels. Often his contributions went uncredited on releases by musicians such as Lightnin' Hopkins and Joe Hinton. In the late 1950s, Brown composed "Two Steps from the Blues", which became the title of an album released by Bobby Bland in 1961. Brown toured as Bland's lead guitarist in the 1950s and 1960s.

Brown continued with his regular recording and stage duties until 1963, when he began a number of day jobs including driving trucks, working as a mechanic, landscaping and operating a forklift. Brown also recalled jam sessions in the mid-1960s at the Club Matinee in Houston, which regularly featured himself, Goree Carter, Joe Bell, Roy Gaines and Clarence Hollimon. He retired in 1991, and formed the Quality Blues Band, with whom he performed up to his death. His 1949 tracks "The Blues Rock", "There Goes The Blues", and "Bongo Boogie" were featured on the compilation album Atlantic Blues: Guitar, released by Atlantic Records in 1986.

In 1996, Brown appeared at the Long Beach Blues Festival. In 1998, Brown finally released an album under his own name, Nothin' but the Truth. The Allmusic journalist Hobart Rowland noted of the tracks, "the insistent toe-tappers 'Your House, Your Home' and 'Stand the Pain' and the keyboard-drenched 'Blue and Lonesome' are easily among Brown's best". Nothin' but the Truth, which included Brown's version of his song "Two Steps from the Blues", was nominated for a W. C. Handy Blues Award in 1999 as the Comeback Album of the Year.

In September 2001, Brown was named Blues Artist of the Year at the Willie Mae "Big Mama" Thornton Blues Festival, which took place in Houston. In January 2002, Brown's second album, Blues Defender was released, also on Choctaw Creek Records. Brown was quoted following an interview in June 2010 with the Valley Morning Star, a Texas newspaper, about his work that "melancholy feelings make good blues music."

In September 2011, Brown's roots were honored with an historical marker on the Mississippi Blues Trail in Ackerman.

Brown died of lung cancer at his home in Houston, Texas, in July 2013, aged 85.

== Discography ==
=== Albums ===
Year	Title	Label
1998	Nothin' but the Truth	Choctaw Creek Records
2002	Blues Defender	Choctaw Creek Records

== See also ==
- List of blues musicians
- Two Steps from the Blues
