= Here's the Man! =

Here's the Man!!!

Studio album by Bobby Bland
- Released: 1962
- Recorded: 1960–62
- Studios: Chicago, Illinois
- Genre: Blues
- Label: Duke

Bobby Bland chronology
Two Steps from the Blues (1961)	Here's the Man!!! (1962)	Call On Me (1969)

Singles from Here's the Man!
- 1. "Turn On Your Love Light" Released: November 1961

Here's the Man!!! is the second studio album by Bobby Bland, released in 1962. It was issued in standard mono, as well true stereo and was the first Duke album issued in the stereo format. Even though the previous album, Two Steps from the Blues remains available on CD, this album hasn't been available in its entirety since 1988. All of the tracks can be found on The Duke Years: 1952-1962, a 2014 Bland compilation from Not Now Music.

== Production ==
The songs were arranged by band leader Joe Scott.

== Critical reception ==
Professional ratings
Review scores
Source	Rating
AllMusic	3/5 stars
The Encyclopedia of Popular Music	4/5 stars
The Rolling Stone Album Guide	3/5 stars

Billboard called Here's the Man! a "fine album ... which shows off [Bland's] stylish vocal treatments."

AllMusic wrote that "Bland displays his vocal power throughout Here's the Man! using his volcanic, guttural delivery to easily work through Joe Scott's galvanizing arrangements, especially on 'Twistin' up the Road' and 'Turn on Your Love Light'." In an appreciation published after Bland's death, Texas Monthly wrote: "Blues could be orchestral, blues could be lush, blues could sound as urbane as it wanted to sound."

The album was a 2024 inductee to the Blues Hall of Fame.

== Track listing ==
1. "36-22-36" (Deadric Malone)
2. "You're the One (That I Adore)" (Malone)
3. "Turn On Your Love Light" (Malone, Joe Scott)
4. "Who Will the Next Fool Be" (Charlie Rich)
5. "You're Worth It All" (Malone, Vernon Morrison)
6. "Blues in the Night" (Harold Arlen, Johnny Mercer)
7. "Your Friends" (Malone)
8. "Ain't That Lovin' You" (Malone)
9. "Jelly Jelly Jelly" (Billy Eckstine, Earl Hines)
10. "Twistin' Up the Road" (Malone, Joe Veasy)
11. "Stormy Monday Blues" (T-Bone Walker)

== Personnel ==
- Bobby "Blue" Bland – vocals
- Wayne Bennett – guitar
- Hamp Simmons – bass
- Teddy Reynolds – piano
- John "Jabo" Starks – drums
- L.A. Hill, Robert Skinner – tenor saxophone
- Rayfield Devers – baritone saxophone
- Jo Scott, Melvin Jackson – trumpet
- Pluma Davis – trombone

== Chart performance ==
The album reached No. 53 on the Billboard Top Monaural LPs.

Chart (1962)	Peak position
US Billboard 150 Best Selling Monoraul LP's	53
