= Call It Stormy Monday (But Tuesday Is Just as Bad) =

Blues standard written by T-Bone Walker

"Call It Stormy Monday (But Tuesday Is Just As Bad)"

Single by T-Bone Walker
- A-side: "I Know Your Wig Has Gone"
- Released: November 1947
- Recorded: Hollywood, California, September 13, 1947
- Genre: Blues
- Length: 3:00
- Label: Black & White
- Songwriter: Aaron Walker a.k.a. T-Bone Walker
- Producer: Ralph Bass

T-Bone Walker singles chronology
"Bobby Sox Blues" (1946)	"Call It Stormy Monday (But Tuesday Is Just As Bad)" (1947)	"Long Skirt Baby Blues" (1947)

"Call It Stormy Monday (But Tuesday Is Just as Bad)" (commonly referred to as "Stormy Monday") is a song written and recorded by American blues electric guitar pioneer T-Bone Walker. It is a slow twelve-bar blues performed in the West Coast blues-style that features Walker's smooth, plaintive vocal and distinctive guitar work. As well as becoming a record chart hit in 1948, it inspired B.B. King and others to take up the electric guitar. "Stormy Monday" became Walker's best-known and most-recorded song.

In 1961, Bobby "Blue" Bland further popularized the song with an appearance in the pop record charts. Bland introduced a new arrangement with chord substitutions, which was later used in many subsequent renditions. His version also incorrectly used the title "Stormy Monday Blues", which was copied and resulted in royalties being paid to songwriters other than Walker. The Allman Brothers Band recorded an extended version for their first live album in 1971, with additional changes to the arrangement. Through the album's popularity and the group's concert performances, they brought "Stormy Monday" to the attention of rock audiences. Similarly, Latimore's 1973 recording made it popular with a later R&B audience.

"Stormy Monday" is one of the most popular blues standards, with numerous renditions. As well as being necessary for blues musicians, it is also found in the repertoires of many jazz, soul, pop, and rock performers. The song is included in the Grammy, Rock and Roll, and Blues Foundation halls of fame as well as the U.S. Library of Congress's National Recording Registry.

== Background ==
T-Bone Walker was one of the earliest musicians to use the electric guitar. After moving to Los Angeles around 1936, he began performing regularly in the clubs along Central Avenue, then the center of the city's jazz and blues music scene. He started as a singer and dancer with jazz and early jump-blues bands, such as Les Hite and his orchestra, but by 1940 was playing electric guitar and singing in his own small combos. His particular style of jazz-influenced blues guitar and showmanship, which included playing the guitar behind his neck and while doing the splits, brought him to the attention of Capitol Records.

In July 1942, Walker recorded "Mean Old World" and "I Got a Break, Baby" as one of the first artists for the Los Angeles-based record company. Music writer Bill Dahl described the songs as "the first sign of the T-Bone Walker that blues guitar aficionados know and love, his fluid, elegant riffs and mellow, burnished vocals setting a standard that all future blues guitarists would measure themselves by". Shortly thereafter, his recording career was interrupted by the 1942–44 musicians' strike and the diversion of shellac (a key material used in the manufacture of the then-standard ten-inch 78 rpm phonograph record) for the U.S. war effort during World War II. By 1946, Walker signed with producer Ralph Bass and Black & White Records. Although there is conflicting information regarding the recording date, "Call It Stormy Monday (But Tuesday Is Just as Bad)" was released as a single in November 1947.

Meanwhile, "Stormy Monday Blues", a jazz single by Earl Hines and His Orchestra with Billy Eckstine on vocals had become a number one hit on Billboard magazine's Harlem Hit Parade chart in 1942 and also reached number 23 in the magazine's pop chart. Credited to Eckstine, Hines, and Bob Crowder, the composition features a big band arrangement with different lyrics and does not include the words "stormy" or "Monday". The fact that both Walker's and the Eckstine/Hines song include "Stormy Monday" in the title has led to confusion regarding the songs' true titles and authorship.

== Recording and composition ==
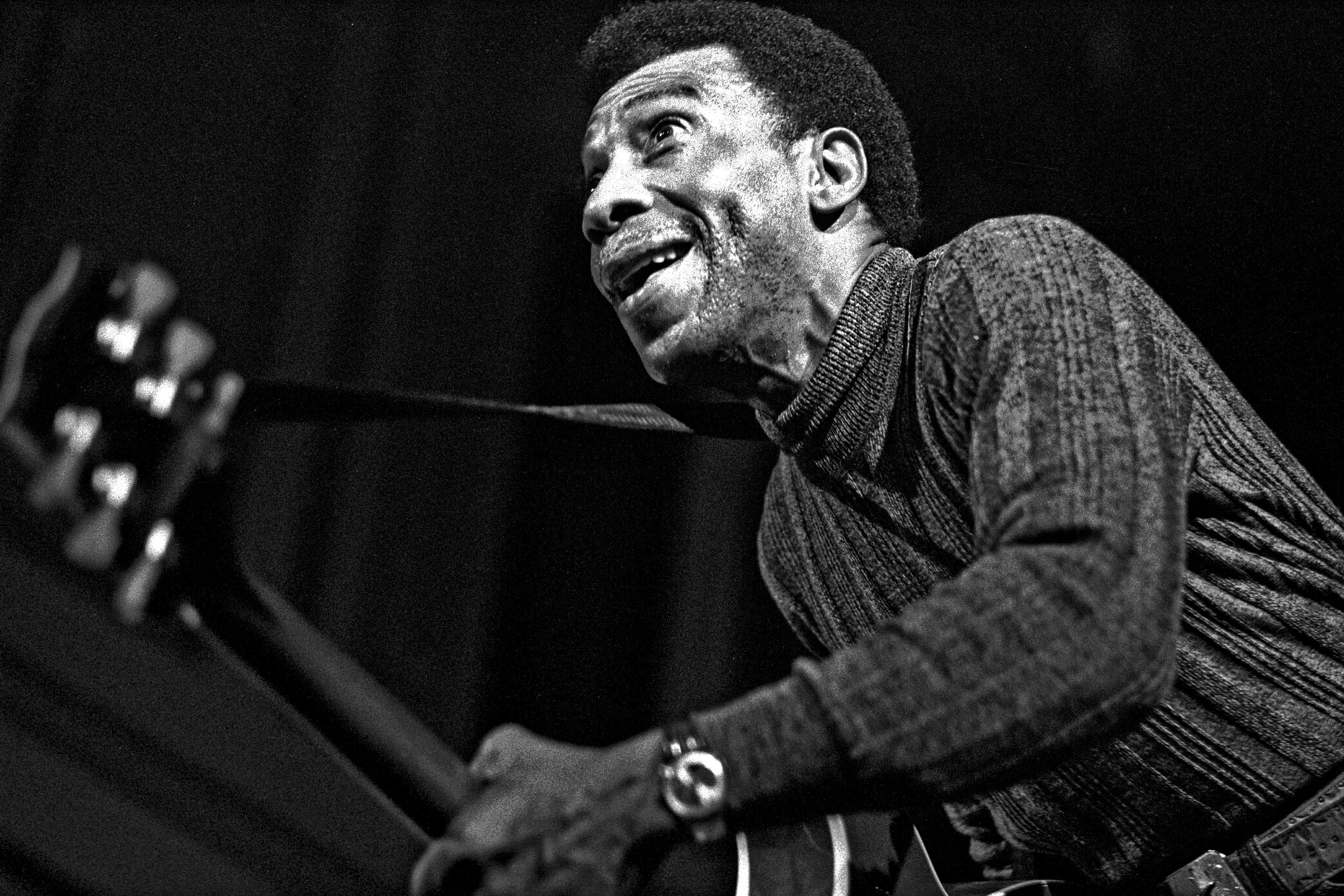
T-Bone Walker at the American Folk Blues Festival in 1972

There are conflicting accounts about the recording date for "Call It Stormy Monday (But Tuesday Is Just as Bad)". In an interview, Walker claimed that he recorded the song in 1940 "just before the war" (the U.S. entered World War II December 7, 1941), but that it was not released because of war-time material restrictions. Journalist Dave Dexter, who worked for Capitol Records in the early 1940s, believed that Walker recorded it for Capitol before the Eckstine/Hines song (March 1942), but that it was not released because of the unavailability of shellac and the recording ban. However, Walker's first single as a band leader, "Mean Old World", which was recorded in July 1942, was released in 1945 by Capitol. One sessionography places the recording of "Stormy Monday" on September 13, 1947, during his third session for Black & White Records. Blues writer Jim O'Neal noted that blues discographies do not show a recording date before 1947.

The recording took place in Hollywood, California, and was produced by Black & White's Ralph Bass. "Stormy Monday" was performed in a "club combo" or West Coast-blues style with a small back-up band. The style, as heard in "Driftin' Blues" (one of the biggest hits of the 1940s), evokes a more intimate musical setting than the prevailing jump-blues dance-hall style. Accompanying Walker is pianist Lloyd Glenn, bassist Arthur Edwards, drummer Oscar Lee Bradley, and horn players John "Teddy" Bruckner (trumpet) and Hubert "Bumps" Myers (tenor saxophone). A key feature of the song's instrumentation is Walker's prominent guitar parts, including the extensive use of ninth chords, which gives the song its distinctive sound. Author Aaron Stang explained: "The real sound of this riff is based on starting each 9th chord a whole step (2 frets) above and sliding down. If we were to analyze this movement, the first chord is technically a 13th chord resolving down to a 9th chord". Guitarist Duke Robillard added

The guitar chord line, it's a little guitar ninth chord figure. That was a unique thing and it became T-Bone's signature. And that chord line seems to have grabbed everybody because everybody plays it with that line in it. And it's almost like a law, that you have to, when you play 'Stormy Monday.'

Walker also plays twelve bars of single-string guitar solo, which writer Lenny Carlson has described as "remain[ing] largely in the middle register, but it contains some gems, particularly in the use of space, phrasing, and melodic development". The horn accompaniment has been compared to that of Count Basie's 1930s Kansas City jazz bands.

Walker uses a standard I-IV-V twelve-bar blues structure for the song and it has been notated in 12/8 time in the key of G with a tempo of 66 beats per minute. The lyrics chronicle the feelings of lost love through the days of week, starting on Monday: "They call it stormy Monday, but Tuesday's just as bad". The mood improves by Friday, when "the eagle flies", a metaphor for payday, which allows for carousing on Saturday. The lyrics end with Sunday, "when the blues and spirituals converged [in] a continuation of a trend used by earlier Mississippi Delta blues singers" and conclude with a prayer asking for the Lord's help because the singer's "Crazy about my baby, yeah send her back to me".

== Releases and charts ==
Black & White Records released "Call It Stormy Monday (But Tuesday Is Just as Bad)" in November 1947. It entered Billboard's Most Played Juke Box Race Records chart on January 24, 1948, and reached number five during a six-week stay. It was T-Bone Walker's second highest charting single (1947's "Bobby Sox Blues" reached number three). According to an article in Billboard for April 30, 1949, the single remained a "strong seller" for Black & White, although it had been out since 1947. The article also announced Capitol Records' purchase of all of Walker's Black & White released and unreleased master recordings and with it the four-year remainder of his recording contract. Two months later in June, Capitol reissued the single on their label.

Walker made several different studio and live recordings of the song for various record companies during his career. In 1956, he recorded a version, titled "Call It Stormy Monday", with pianist Lloyd Glenn, bassist Billy Hadnott, and drummer Oscar Bradley (Glenn and Bradley had performed for the original 1947 recording). It was produced by Nesuhi Ertegun and is included on Walker's 1959 album, T-Bone Blues, for Atlantic Records. Writer Bill Dahl described the remake as "luxurious" with Walker's guitar "so crisp and clear it seems as though he's sitting right next to you". Another recording, titled "Stormy Monday", is included on the 1968 album, Stormy Monday Blues for Bluesway Records. A later recording of the song, which uses chord substitutions similar to Bobby Bland's 1961 rendition, was included on The Sounds of American Culture series on NPR in 2008.

== Recognition and influence ==
In 1983, T-Bone Walker's original "Call It Stormy Monday (But Tuesday Is Just as Bad)" was inducted into the Blues Foundation Blues Hall of Fame in the "Classic of Blues Recording — Single or Album Track" category. Writing for the foundation, Jim O'Neal called it "one of the most influential records not only in blues history, but in guitar history". In 1991, it was inducted into the Grammy Hall of Fame, which "honor[s] recordings of lasting qualitative or historical significance". The song was included as one of the "500 Songs That Shaped Rock and Roll" by the Rock and Roll Hall of Fame in 1995. The U.S. National Recording Preservation Board selected the song in 2007 for inclusion in the Library of Congress' National Recording Registry of "sound recordings that are culturally, historically or aesthetically significant".

B.B. King biographer David McGee referred to it as a "Mount Rushmore of a blues song". Singer and writer Billy Vera noted "if T-Bone had done nothing more in his career than write and record this one tune, his esteemed place in the history of American music would be guaranteed". As an early electric blues guitar soloist, Walker influenced a generation of blues musicians. In several interviews, B.B. King has stated that "Stormy Monday" inspired him to begin playing electric guitar:

My greatest musical debt is to T-Bone ...'Stormy Monday' was the first tune. 'They call it Stormy Monday', sang T-Bone, 'but Tuesday's just as bad'. Yes, Lord! The first line, the first thrilling notes, the first sound of his guitar, and the attitude in his voice was riveting. I especially loved 'Stormy Monday'—and I still sing it today.

According to music journalist Charles Shaar Murray, other musicians similarly inspired to take up the electric guitar upon hearing Walker's song include Clarence "Gatemouth" Brown, Lowell Fulson, and Albert King.

== Other renditions ==
"Stormy Monday" has become a standard of the blues and also has a broader appeal. In addition to being necessary for virtually all blues musicians, the song is known to performers in several other genres, who would not otherwise play any blues. Its popularity is such that one encyclopedia entry concludes, "What bluesman does not have his own version?" Billy Vera wrote "rest assured, as you read these notes, someone somewhere is performing 'Call It Stormy Monday'".

=== Confusion over name ===
Due to its length, "Call It Stormy Monday (But Tuesday Is Just as Bad)" is shortened to "Call It Stormy Monday" or most often "Stormy Monday". Confusingly, it is also sometimes referred to as "Stormy Monday Blues", the same title as the 1942 song by Billy Eckstine and Earl Hines. According to T-Bone Walker, he specifically gave his song the longer name to set it apart. However, trouble ensued when other artists began recording it using these shortened names. Walker blamed Duke Records owner Don Robey for giving it the wrong title for his artists, including Bobby Bland's 1962 rendition, which appeared as "Stormy Monday Blues". Bland's version, which was an R&B and pop chart hit, was subsequently copied by other artists, who also used the incorrect title. As a result, Walker lost out on royalties when his song was misnamed "Stormy Monday Blues" and the payments were forwarded to Eckstine, Hines, and Crowder. Even though Latimore's 1973 hit version of the song was titled "Stormy Monday", the single incorrectly listed "Hines-Eckstine" as the composers.

=== Bobby Bland version ===
American singer Bobby Bland recorded his interpretation of the song in Nashville, Tennessee, in September 1961, during the same session that produced the song, "Turn On Your Love Light". Drummer John "Jabo" Starks recalled

T-Bone Walker's 'Stormy Monday Blues' was supposed to be a 'throwaway' tune. We had already finished the album, and Bobby [Bland] said, 'Hey, man, I want to do that tune. Let's do that tune, just for me'. We said, 'Okay', and we sat there and did it, just the rhythm section. I think it was two takes. Wayne Bennett, the guitar player, wanted to change something. Hamp Simmons out of Houston played an old Kay electric bass.

Rather than copy Walker's arrangement, Bland felt he had to do something different with the song. Most notably, his version features chord substitutions in bars seven through ten:

I^{7}	IV^{9}	I^{7}	I^{7}	IV^{9}	IV^{9}	I^{7}–ii^{7}	iii^{7}–♭iii^{7}	ii^{7}	V^{9}	I^{7}–IV^{9}	I^{7}–V^{9}

This minor-chord progression had been used in several of Bland's songs, including his 1957 breakthrough number "Farther Up the Road", and is found in many subsequent renditions of "Stormy Monday". Guitarist Wayne Bennett commented that he had been influenced by T-Bone Walker and Pee Wee Crayton; Bennett's own playing on the recording influenced many guitarists, including Duane Allman.

When Duke Records released Bland's version, it was inexplicably re-titled "Stormy Monday Blues". The single reached number five during a thirteen-week stay on the R&B chart. It was also included on Bland's 1962 album Here's the Man!, which reached number 53 on the Billboard album chart. Additionally, "Stormy Monday" went to number 43 on the pop chart and Bland made his fourth appearance on the music variety television program American Bandstand, where he performed it to dancing teenagers.

=== The Allman Brothers Band version ===
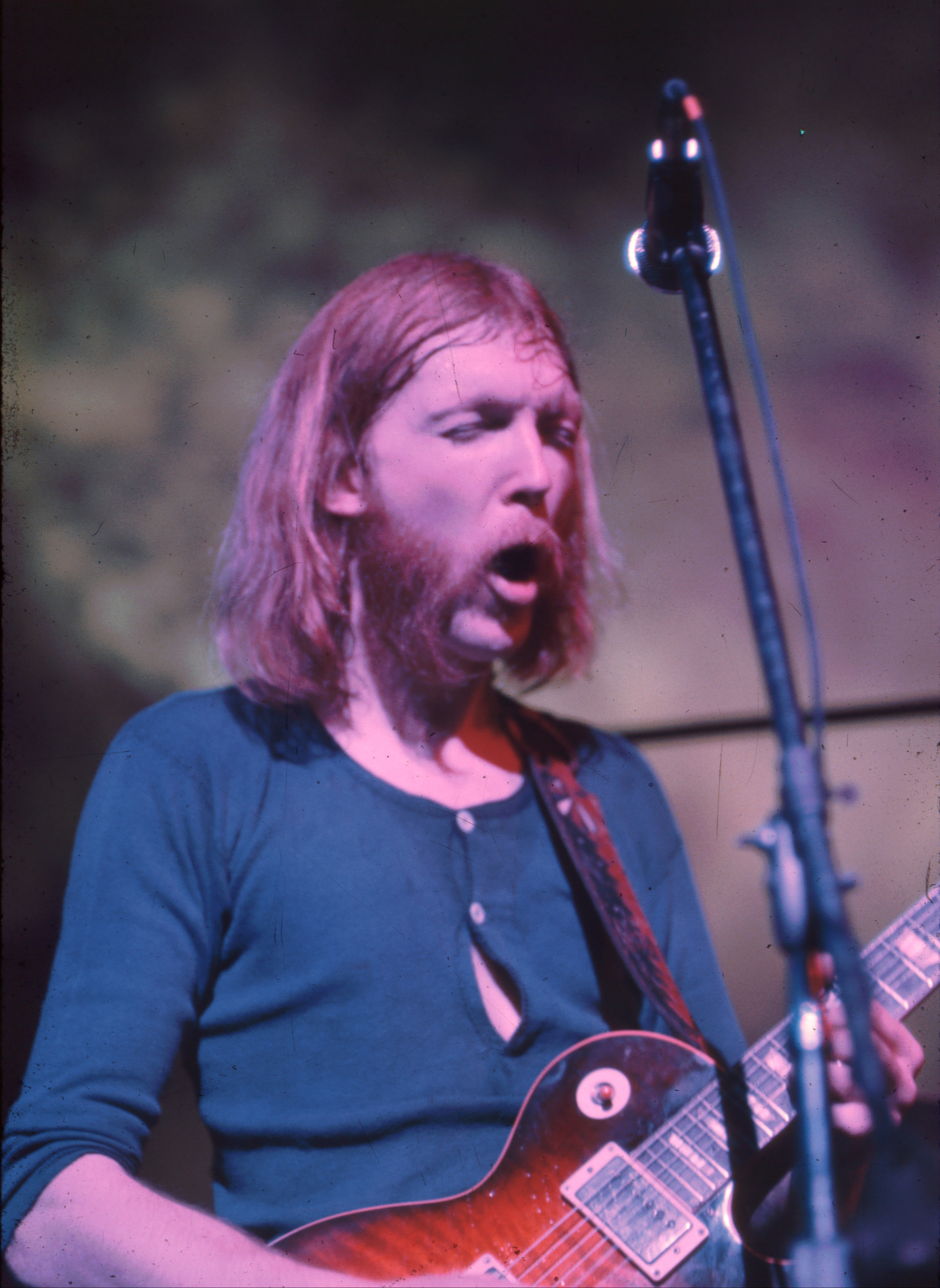
Duane Allman at the Fillmore East, June 26, 1971 (late show)

Brothers Duane and Gregg Allman began performing "Stormy Monday" with their early group, the Allman Joys, and it later became part of the Allman Brothers Band's repertoire. A March 1971 performance of the song at the Fillmore East concert hall in New York City was recorded and released on their At Fillmore East album in 1971. Their version is based on Bobby Bland's 1961 recording, but expanded to over eight minutes with improvised soloing. In the bottom of bar 8, they substituted the ♭III^{7} chord. Additionally, they substituted the V^{9} chord in bar 10 with a IVmin^{7} and the one in bar 12 with a V aug.

The instrumentation of the song is typical of the group, consisting of vocals, two electric guitars, bass guitar, organ, and drums. It demonstrates a different style of music, however, from most Allman Brothers pieces, due to its slow tempo. Duane Allman takes the first solo, with Gregg Allman's organ solo shifting to a jazz-waltz feel, and Dickey Betts' guitar solo being the last before a vocal coda. By means of a careful tape edit, a harmonica solo by Thom Doucette was omitted from the issued version in 1971; it was restored to the song in the 1992 release of the Fillmore Concerts. At Fillmore East became one of the Allman Brothers Band's most popular and enduring albums; for rock audiences, their "Stormy Monday" became the definitive version of the song.

=== Latimore version ===
American singer Latimore recorded "Stormy Monday" in 1973. His rendering of the song as an uptempo, jazz-influenced piece evokes a 1962 recording by Lou Rawls that was included on Rawls' Stormy Monday album with Les McCann. However, according to music writer David Whiteis, "its propulsive, pop-tinged groove and Latimore's own jubilant vocal directness made this incarnation of the classic entirely his own". The song was not initially promoted as a potential hit single; however, radio audiences responded so positively that it became his first major hit. "Stormy Monday" eventually reached number 27 on the R&B chart as well as number 102 on the pop chart and is included on Latimore's self-titled debut album for Glades Records. The Blues Foundation, in its statement about Latimore's induction to the Blues Hall of Fame in 2017, noted the importance of "Stormy Monday" on his performing career.
