= That's the Way Love Is (Bobby Bland song) =

Single by Bobby Bland
- A-side: "Call on Me"
- Released: 1962
- Length: 2:30
- Label: Duke
- Songwriter: Deadric Malone

Bobby Bland singles chronology
"Stormy Monday Blues" (1961)	"That's the Way Love Is" (1962)	"Call on Me" (1961)

"That's the Way Love Is" is a 1962 R&B single by the American blues singer Bobby Bland. The single hit number 1 on the US Billboard R&B chart. "That's the Way Love Is" also made the Top 40 on the pop chart. The B-side "Call On Me" charted simultaneously. The B-side was more successful on the pop singles chart, peaking at number 22, and on the soul singles chart "Call On Me" made it to number 6.

Bland's "That's the Way Love Is" is a different song than the 1969 pop/soul single by Marvin Gaye, ("That's the Way Love Is").

== Chart positions ==
Chart (1963)	Peak position
U.S. Billboard Hot 100	33
U.S. Billboard Hot R&B Sides	1
