= Dreamer (Bobby Bland album) =

1974 studio album by Bobby "Blue" Bland

Studio album by Bobby Bland
- Released: 1974
- Studios: ABC, Los Angeles, California
- Genres: Soul; blues
- Length: 35:39
- Labels: Dunhill; ABC
- Producer: Steve Barri

Bobby Bland chronology
His California Album (1973)	Dreamer (1974)	Get On Down with Bobby Bland (1975)

Singles from Dreamer
- 1. "Ain't No Love in the Heart of the City" Released: 1974; 2. "I Wouldn't Treat a Dog (The Way You Treated Me)" Released: 1974; 3. "Yolanda" Released: 1975

Professional ratings
Review scores
Source	Rating
AllMusic	2.5/5 stars
Christgau's Record Guide	B+
The Penguin Guide to Blues Recordings	3/4 stars
The Rolling Stone Record Guide	2/5 stars

Dreamer is the ninth solo studio album by American blues singer Bobby Bland. It was released in 1974 through ABC/Dunhill Records. Recording sessions took place at ABC Recording Studios in Los Angeles with songwriter and record producer Steve Barri. The album charted at number 172 on the Billboard 200 and at number 5 on the Top R&B/Hip-Hop Albums in the United States. It spawned three hit singles: "Ain't No Love in the Heart of the City", "I Wouldn't Treat a Dog (The Way You Treated Me)" and "Yolanda".

== Track listing ==
No.	Title	Writer(s)	Length
1.	"Ain't No Love in the Heart of the City"	Michael "Harvey" Price; Dan Walsh	3:51
2.	"I Wouldn't Treat a Dog (The Way You Treated Me)"	Michael "Harvey" Price; Dan Walsh; Michael Omartian; Steve Barri	3:15
3.	"Lovin' on Borrowed Time"	Charlotte Ann Matheny; Nita Garfield	3:19
4.	"The End of the Road"	Oscar Perry	3:06
5.	"I Ain't Gonna Be the First to Cry"	Michael "Harvey" Price; Dan Walsh; Mitchell Bottler	3:36
6.	"Dreamer"	Jerry Zaremba	4:09
7.	"Yolanda"	Daniel Moore	3:43
8.	"Twenty-Four Hour Blues"	Michael "Harvey" Price; Dan Walsh; Steve Barri	3:59
9.	"Cold Day in Hell"	Oscar Perry	2:43
10.	"Who's Foolin' Who?"	Michael "Harvey" Price; Dan Walsh; Michael Omartian; Steve Barri	4:18
Total length:			35:39

== Personnel ==
- Robert Calvin 'Bobby "Blue" Bland' Brooks – lead vocals
- Maxine Willard Waters – backing vocals
- Julia Tillman Waters – backing vocals
- Ginger Blake – backing vocals
- Michael Omartian – piano, organ, clavinet, Arp synthesizer, blues harp, arrangement
- Larry Carlton – guitar
- Dean Parks – guitar
- Ben Benay – guitar
- Wilton Felder – bass
- Ed Greene – drums
- Jackie Kelso – horns
- Ernest James Watts – horns
- Lewis Melvin McCreary – horns
- Pete Christlieb – horns
- James Ronald Horn – horns
- Paul J. Hubinon – horns
- Tony Terran – horns
- The Sid Sharp Strings – strings

Technical

- Steve Barri – producer
- Roger Scott Nichols – engineering
- Howard Gayle – engineering
- Phil Kaye – engineering
- Earl Klasky – design
- Ken Veeder – photography

== Chart history ==
Album

Chart (1974)	Peak position
US Billboard 200	172
US Top R&B/Hip-Hop Albums (Billboard)	5

Singles

Title	Peak chart positions	
Title	US	US R&B
"Ain't No Love in the Heart of the City"	91	9
"I Wouldn't Treat a Dog (The Way You Treated Me)"	88	3
"Yolanda"	104	21
