= Get On Down with Bobby Bland =

Studio album by Bobby Bland
- Released: 1975
- Genres: R&B, country
- Label: ABC
- Producers: Don Gant, Ron Chancey

Bobby Bland chronology
| Dreamer (1974) | Get On Down with Bobby Bland (1975) | Reflections in Blue (1977) |

Get On Down with Bobby Bland is an album by the American musician Bobby Bland, released in 1975. It peaked at No. 154 on the Billboard 200. Bland supported the album with a North American tour.

== Production ==
Bland had for years wanted to make a country album; he noted that he had always preferred country to "hard blues". Recorded in Nashville, Get On Down was produced by Don Gant and Ron Chancey. Harrison Calloway Jr., of the Muscle Shoals Horns, arranged the brass parts. "You've Never Been This Far Before" is a cover of the Conway Twitty song. "Today I Started Loving You Again" was written by Merle Haggard and Buck Owens. "You're Gonna Love Yourself (In the Morning)" is a version of the Donnie Fritts song.

== Critical reception ==
Professional ratings
Review scores
| Source | Rating |
|---|---|
| All Music Guide to the Blues | 3/5 stars |
| The Buffalo News | 84/100 |
| Robert Christgau | B+ |
| The Encyclopedia of Popular Music | 2/5 stars |
| The New Rolling Stone Record Guide | 2/5 stars |
| The Penguin Guide to Blues Recordings | 2.5/4 stars |

The San Francisco Chronicle called the album "a classic" and said that "Bland brings a sensitivity to the emotional content of the lyrics that transcends any idiomatic considerations." The Daily Herald-Telephone praised Bland's cover of "Today I Started Loving You Again". The Ann Arbor News opined that Bland consistently suffered from poor production, although it acknowledged that "his voice is still magnificent and he could probably sell any material". The Kansas City Star criticized the "arrangements so slick they are maddening."

The Dorset Evening Echo stated the Bland "treats [the songs] with equal respect regardless of the sometimes trite lyrical content and the band sounds positively inspired by his presence." The Democrat and Chronicle lauded Bland's "dynamic, original and fantastic voice". The Daily Record likened Get On Down to a Ray Charles C&W album, but missed the "leaner arrangements" of Bland's Duke Records work. Robert Christgau noted that the arrangements were "more suitable (even funky)" than on Charles's albums.

== Track listing ==
Side A

1. "I Take It On Home"
2. "Today I Started Loving You Again"
3. "You've Always Got the Blues"
4. "I Hate You"

Side B

1. "You've Never Been This Far Before"
2. "If Fingerprints Showed Up on Skin"
3. "Someone to Give My Love To"
4. "Too Far Gone"
5. "You're Gonna Love Yourself (In the Morning)"
