= His California Album =

Studio album by Bobby "Blue" Bland
- Released: 1973
- Genre: Blues, soul
- Label: Dunhill
- Producer: Steve Barri

Bobby "Blue" Bland chronology
Spotlighting the Man (1969)	His California Album (1973)	Dreamer (1974)

His California Album is an album by the American musician Bobby "Blue" Bland, released in 1973. The album introduced Bland to a larger pop audience. It peaked at No. 136 on the Billboard 200. Bland supported the album with a North American tour.

== Production ==
The album was produced by Steve Barri and arranged by Michael Omartian. Mel Brown and Larry Carlton were among the guitar players who contributed to the recording sessions. "Goin' Down Slow" was written by St. Louis Jimmy Oden. "(If Loving You Is Wrong) I Don't Want to Be Right" is a cover of the Luther Ingram song. "I've Got to Use My Imagination" is a version of the song made famous by Gladys Knight & the Pips.

== Critical reception ==
Professional ratings
Review scores
Source	Rating
All Music Guide to Soul	3/5 stars
The Buffalo News	90/100
Robert Christgau	B
The Encyclopedia of Popular Music	2/5 stars
The Grove Press Guide to the Blues on CD	2.5/5 stars
MusicHound Blues: The Essential Album Guide	3/5 stars
The Penguin Guide to Blues Recordings	3/4 stars
The New Rolling Stone Record Guide	3/5 stars

The Omaha World-Herald called Bland "a most persuasive vocalist" whose "style loses little of its bite". The Ann Arbor News praised Bland's "exquisite, huskily expressive voice". The Berkeley Daily Gazette opined that the album "is a successful merger of blues and soul with Bland's Sam Cookish strains partying on both sides." Robert Christgau lamented that Bland "[put] his stamp on nothing." The Los Angeles Times deemed "It's Not the Spotlight" "one of the best 'lost love' songs of the year." The Herald considered His California Album to be one of the best blues albums of 1973.

Joel Selvin, in a 1991 San Francisco Chronicle article, called the album "a lost classic". In 2000, the Evening Standard labeled it "a masterpiece of gritty crossover soul."

== Track listing ==
No.	Title	Length
1.	"This Time I'm Gone for Good"
2.	"Up and Down World"
3.	"It's Not the Spotlight"
4.	"(If Loving You Is Wrong) I Don't Want to Be Right"
5.	"Goin' Down Slow"
6.	"The Right Place at the Right Time"
7.	"Help Me Through the Day"
8.	"Where Baby Went"
9.	"Friday the 13th Child"
10.	"I've Got to Use My Imagination"
