= Years of Tears =

Studio album by Bobby "Blue" Bland
- Released: 1993
- Studio: Muscle Shoals
- Genres: Blues, R&B
- Label: Malaco
- Producers: Wolf Stephenson, Tommy Couch

Bobby "Blue" Bland chronology
I Pity the Fool: The Duke Recordings (1992)	Years of Tears (1993)	Turn on Your Love Light: The Duke Recordings (1994)

Years of Tears is an album by the American musician Bobby "Blue" Bland, released in 1993. Bland supported the album with a North American tour. The album peaked at No. 80 on Billboard's Top R&B Albums chart. It won a W. C. Handy Award, in the Soul/Blues category.

== Production ==
Produced by Wolf Stephenson and Tommy Couch, Years of Tears was recorded in Muscle Shoals, Alabama. Bland worked on the album for more than a year. Frederick Knight wrote three of the album's songs; including Knight's songs, the majority were written by Malaco Records songwriters.

== Critical reception ==
Professional ratings
Review scores
Source	Rating
AllMusic	4/5 stars
(The New) Rolling Stone Album Guide	3/5 stars

The San Antonio Express-News considered Years of Tears to be among Bland's best albums. The Los Angeles Times wrote that it "plays to his key strength, which is an ability to bring you into the bleak, dark, anxious and solitary places inhabited by troubled minds." The Denver Post noted that "the Muscle Shoals, Ala., session players provide him with gritty, introspective deep-soul instrumental support that seems relevant and vital for the 1990s." The Commercial Appeal concluded that Bland "is in excellent voice throughout." Texas Monthly determined that "the label's synthesizer-and-strings approach has kept him contemporary without making him sound foolish."

AllMusic wrote: "Bland's animated, raw voice, though not as wide-ranging, still has a character and quality unmatched in blues, soul or vintage R&B."

== Track listing ==
No.	Title	Length
1.	"Somewhere Between Right & Wrong"
2.	"There's a Stranger in My House"
3.	"Hole in the Wall"
4.	"Years of Tears to Go"
5.	"Hurtin' Time Again"
6.	"I Just Tripped on a Piece of Your Broken Heart"
7.	"Sweet Lady Love"
8.	"Love of Mine"
9.	"I've Got to Have Your Love Tonight"
10.	"You Put the Hurt on a Hurtin' Man"
