= Joe Hinton =

- Born: Joseph Hinton; November 15, 1929; Evansville, Indiana or Clarksdale, Mississippi, U.S.
- Died: August 13, 1968 (aged 38) Boston, Massachusetts, U.S.
- Occupation: Soul singer
- Years active: Mid 1950s–1968

Joseph Hinton (November 15, 1929 – August 13, 1968) was an American soul singer.

== Biography ==
Though Clarksdale, Mississippi has been claimed as his birthplace, most sources state that Hinton was born in Evansville, Indiana, where he married LaVerne Flowers and started a family. He began as a gospel singer with the Blair Gospel Singers, the Chosen Gospel Quartet and the Spirit of Memphis Quartet. Producer Don Robey asked the singer to try doing secular tunes, and Hinton began recording for Robey's record label, Peacock Records, in 1958. It was not until 1963, with his fifth single on the label, that he managed to chart with "You Know It Ain't Right"; the next single, "Better to Give Than to Receive", also hit the lower regions of the charts. His biggest hit was 1964's "Funny How Time Slips Away", written by Willie Nelson; the tune (simply credited as "Funny" on the original record label) peaked at #13 on the Billboard Hot 100 that year. Cash Box magazine listed "Funny How Time Slips Away" as #1 for four weeks on their R&B chart. The track sold over one million copies, and was awarded a gold disc. "I Want a Little Girl", the next single, also charted, but it was his last hit.

Hinton died of skin cancer in 1968 in Boston, Massachusetts, at the age of 38, while still in the prime of his recording career.

He is not to be confused with another R&B singer, who recorded for the Arvee and Soul labels as Little Joe Hinton, for Hotlanta as Joe Hinton, and who is also believed to have recorded under the name Jay Lewis.

== Chart singles ==
Charting singles performed by Joe Hinton
Year	Single	Chart Positions	
Year	Single	US Pop	US R&B
1963	"You Know It Ain't Right"	88	20
1963	"Better to Give Than Receive"	89	—
1964	"Funny"	13	1
1964	"A Thousand Cups of Happiness"	111	19
1965	"I Want a Little Girl"	132	34
