= I Pity the Fool =

Song first recorded by Bobby Bland

Single by Bobby Bland

from the album Two Steps from the Blues
- B-side: "Close to You"
- Released: 1961
- Recorded: 1960
- Studio: Chicago
- Genre: Soul blues
- Length: 2:30
- Label: Duke
- Songwriters: Deadric Malone (credited); Joe Medwick (actual)
- Producer: Don Robey

Bobby Bland singles chronology
| "Cry, Cry, Cry" (1960) | "I Pity the Fool" (1961) | "Don't Cry No More" (1961) |

"I Pity the Fool" is a soul blues song originally recorded by Bobby Bland in 1961 for his first Duke Records album, Two Steps from the Blues. Many music writers believe that it was written by Joe Medwick, although Duke owner Don Robey (using the pseudonym "Deadric Malone") appears on the songwriting credits.

The lyrics tell of a man, who, while pitying others for falling for a certain woman, knows that he is also shamed. After its release as a single, it became one of Bland's biggest hits and most identifiable songs. Subsequently, several artists have recorded renditions.

== Original song ==
Bland described "I Pity the Fool" as one of the first songs to fit his emerging style. Although he did not recall the writer, he acknowledged Joe Medwick's contribution. However, Bland biographer Charles Farley identifies Medwick as the actual writer. Medwick (born Medwick Veasey) was a Houston, Texas-area, independent songwriter/broker. He regularly sold his completed songs to Duke owner Robey for small sums, along with any claim for the songwriting credit.

Bland recorded "I Pity the Fool" during the second session for his album Two Steps from the Blues. Overseeing the November 12, 1960, session in Chicago was band leader and arranger Joe Scott. He used a six-piece horn section with twin trumpets. Wayne Bennett's contrasting lead guitar along with the horn arrangement are key elements of the song. Music writer Chris O'Leary describes Bland's vocal:

Bland opened with dismissive coolness, taking his time on the descending title phrase ... but this is just bluster: when the song moved to its bridge, Bland howled. He was still entwined with her and the shame of it is killing him.

Blues historian David Evans calls Bland, "the picture of utter humiliation in this frightening outburst, sounding like he is going to do harm to himself or someone else. This is powerful soul blues at its emotional best."

=== Releases and charts ===
"I Pity the Fool" was the first single released from Two Steps from the Blues. It entered the Billboard's Hot R&B Sides chart in February 1961, where it reached number one. The single also appeared at number 43 on the Billboard Hot 100 singles chart. As one of his most successful songs, it appears on numerous compilation albums, such as Bobby Bland: I Pity the Fool – The Duke Recordings, Vol. One (1992).

=== Personnel ===
- Joe Scott – trumpet
- Melvin Jackson – trumpet
- Pluma Davis – trombone
- Robert Skinner – tenor saxophone
- L.A. Hill – tenor saxophone
- Rayfield Devers – baritone saxophone
- Teddy Raynolds – piano
- Wayne Bennett – guitar
- Hamp Simmons – bass
- John "Jabo" Starks – drums
- unknown – flute, choir, and strings

== The Manish Boys (with David Bowie) version ==
"I Pity the Fool"

Single by the Manish Boys
- B-side: "Take My Tip"
- Released: March 5, 1965
- Recorded: January 15, 1965
- Studio: IBC, London
- Genre: Rhythm and blues; blues rock
- Length: 2:08
- Label: Parlophone
- Songwriters: Deadric Malone (credited); Joe Medwick (actual)
- Producer: Shel Talmy

David Bowie singles chronology
| "Liza Jane" (1964) | "I Pity the Fool" (1965) | "You've Got a Habit of Leaving" (1965) |

The Manish Boys' (at that time featuring David Bowie) version was released in 1965. The recording was produced by Shel Talmy, who was also producing the early singles and albums by the Who and the Kinks. Jimmy Page was Talmy's regular session musician and he played the guitar solo on "I Pity the Fool".

During these sessions Page gave Bowie a guitar riff, which he didn't know what to do with. Bowie later used this guitar riff in two different songs, first on "The Supermen" from 1970 and second on "Dead Man Walking" from 1997. The B-side, "Take My Tip" was the first song written by David Bowie (then known and credited as Davie Jones) to be released on record.

=== Releases ===
Both the A and B-sides were re-released by EMI in the UK in March 1979 on one side of a 7-inch single. On the B-side of this re-release was "You've Got a Habit of Leaving" and "Baby Loves That Way". This version was again released by See For Miles Records in the UK in October 1982, and as a 12-inch picture disc in June 1985. The re-release by See For Miles in 1982 took the edge off a collector's market since EMI's March 1979 reissue disappeared almost as quickly as it had arrived. Both tracks appear on the CD compilation Early On (1964-1966) from 1991, but both have alternate vocals.

=== Personnel ===
According to Chris O'Leary:

- David Jones – vocals, alto saxophone
- Johnny Flux – rhythm guitar
- Jimmy Page – lead guitar
- John Watson – bass guitar
- Mick White – drums
- Bob Solly – Leslie organ
- Woolf Byrne – baritone saxophone
- Paul Rodriguez – tenor saxophone, trumpet

Technical

- Shel Talmy – producer
- Glyn Johns – engineer

== Renditions by other artists ==
As one of Bland's most popular songs, several artists have recorded "I Pity the Fool". Soul singer Ann Peebles recorded it for her 1971 album Part Time Love. Released as a single by Hi Records, her version reached number 18 on Billboard's R&B chart and number 85 on its Hot 100.
