= Memphis Monday Morning =

Studio album by Bobby "Blue" Bland
- Released: 1998
- Genre: Blues, soul
- Label: Malaco
- Producer: Wolf Stephenson, Tommy Couch

Bobby "Blue" Bland chronology
| Live on Beale Street (1998) | Memphis Monday Morning (1998) | The Anthology (2001) |

Memphis Monday Morning is an album by the American musician Bobby "Blue" Bland, released in 1998. Bland supported the album with North American club dates. It entered the Top Blues Albums chart at No. 14.

The album was nominated for a Grammy Award for best traditional blues album, as well as a W. C. Handy Award for best soul-blues album.

== Production ==
The album was produced by Wolf Stephenson and Tommy Couch. Bland worked on it for a year and a half. Most of the songs were written by a team of Malaco Records songwriters that included George Jackson. "Lookin' for Some Tush", a cover of the ZZ Top song, was recorded during a 1985 session.

== Critical reception ==
Professional ratings
Review scores
| Source | Rating |
|---|---|
| AllMusic | 4/5 stars |
| The Encyclopedia of Popular Music | 2/5 stars |
| (The New) Rolling Stone Album Guide | 3.5/5 stars |
| Springfield News-Leader | 3/4 stars |

The Commercial Appeal wrote that the album "finds the singing legend in a brashly relaxed mood." The Springfield News-Leader determined that "the centerpiece numbers are languid blues, especially the nine-minute title track with a restrained but emotional vocal and nice brass ensemble work." The Washington Post said that "Malaco's stable of gifted house writers ... have a knack for coming up with fresh variations on the ancient blues themes of hard times and unfaithful lovers." The San Diego Union-Tribune called the album "superb," writing that Bland is "backed by some of the South's finest studio musicians."

AllMusic wrote that "the husky-throated blues singer, who was close to 70 when this CD dropped, still has that growl that makes body hair stand on end, and he forges on stronger than ever without any noticeable quality drops." The Rough Guide to the Blues considered the title track to be "his best recording in several years."

== Track listing ==
| No. | Title | Length |
|---|---|---|
| 1. | "I'm Bobby 'B'" |
| 2. | "I Don't Want No Kickin' in My Stall" |
| 3. | "There's a Rat Loose in My House" |
| 4. | "The Truth Will Set You Free" |
| 5. | "Memphis Monday Morning" |
| 6. | "I'm Glad" |
| 7. | "My Baby Is the Only One" |
| 8. | "I Hate Missin' You" |
| 9. | "You Left Me With the Blues" |
| 10. | "Lookin' for Some Tush" |
