= Farther Up the Road =

Blues standard first recorded by Bobby "Blue" Bland

Single by Bobby "Blue" Bland
- B-side: "Sometime Tomorrow"
- Released: 1957
- Recorded: Houston, Texas, 1957
- Genre: Blues
- Length: 2:45
- Label: Duke
- Songwriters: Don Robey; Joe Medwick Veasey
- Producer: Don Robey

Bobby "Blue" Bland singles chronology
| "Don't Want No Woman" (1957) | "Farther Up the Road" (1957) | "Teach Me" (1957) |

"Farther Up the Road" or "Further on Up the Road" is a blues song first recorded in 1957 by Bobby "Blue" Bland. It is an early influential Texas shuffle and features guitar playing that represents the transition from the 1940s blues style to the 1960s blues-rock style.

The song became Bland's first record chart-topping success and one of his best-known tunes. As a blues standard, "Farther Up the Road" has been performed and recorded by numerous blues and other artists, including Eric Clapton who has made it part of his repertoire.

In 2022, Bland's recording was inducted into the Blues Hall of Fame in the 'Classics of Blues Recording – Singles' category.

== Background ==
The songwriting for "Farther Up the Road" is credited to Joe Medwick Veasey, a Houston-area independent songwriter/broker, and Duke Records owner Don Robey. In an interview, blues singer Johnny Copeland claimed he and Medwick wrote the song in one night; Medwick then sold it the next day to Robey, with Robey taking Copeland's songwriting credit. According to Bobby Bland, Medwick wrote the song without any involvement by Robey.

The guitar work on the song has been attributed to three different guitar players: Pat Hare, Mel Brown, and Wayne Bennett. However, Bland noted that Hare was the session guitarist, having been chosen by arranger/trumpeter Joe Scott. It was Hare's only session with Bland, although he was a member of Junior Parker's Blue Flames, who sometimes provided backup while Bland was on tour. Bennett and Brown served as Bland's later guitarists.

== Composition and lyrics ==
"Farther Up the Road" has been called a "seminal Texas shuffle" featuring "a style which Bland evolved as his own, with his light, melodic vocals riding over an ebullient shuffle". According to music critic Dave Marsh, "Bland's deep vocal and Scott's arrangement, which swings as hard as it rocks, links Ray Charles' big band R&B to more modern currents in Southern soul". Bland's smooth vocals are contrasted with Pat Hare's raucous, overdriven guitar fills and soloing, a style which prefigured the blues-rock sound of the late 1960s. Music critic Dave Marsh adds that the song is "a virtually perfect Texas blues ... [Pat Hare's] signature lick provides the missing link between T-Bone Walker and Eric Clapton". The backing arrangement is provided by the Bill Harvey Orchestra, who added a big band-influenced intro and outro as well as chord substitutions to the twelve-bar scheme. The song has been notated in 4/4 time in the key of F with a moderate (108 beats per minute) tempo.

Part of the song's success may be due to Bland's "telling a convincing story, making brief lyrical vignettes highly believable with his conversational style". Author Anand Prahlad comments on the song's use of "the theme of reciprocity":

Farther on up the road, someone's gonna hurt you like you hurt me (2×)
Farther on up the road, baby you just wait and see
You got to reap just what you sow, that old saying is true (2×)
Like you mistreat someone, someone's gonna mistreat you

However, Prahlad adds, "His [Bland's] usage of the proverb contains a philosophical dimension that is absent from the other [songs with similar themes] and a momentary distance from the emotional wound".

The song was Bland's first charting single after several years of recording for various record companies. It became a number one hit during a fourteen-week stay in 1957 in the Billboard R&B chart as well as reaching number 43 in the Billboard Hot 100 pop chart. Bland enjoyed nearly uninterrupted chart success for the next twenty years. "Farther Up the Road" is included on Bland's first album, Blues Consolidated, a co-release with Junior Parker in 1958 on Duke Records. The song is included on many official Bland compilations, including The Best of Bobby Bland and I Pity the Fool: The Duke Recordings, Vol. 1.

== Eric Clapton renditions ==
Eric Clapton recorded several versions of "Farther Up the Road" over the years, usually calling it after its opening lyrics "Further on Up the Road". Clapton uses the lyrics from the original, but the song is performed at a faster tempo as an unembellished shuffle. The song first appeared on his 1975 live album E. C. Was Here. In 1976, a live version was recorded with Freddie King, which is included on Freddie King (1934–1976). Also in 1976, he performed the song with the Band in the concert film The Last Waltz. Another live version was recorded in Japan in 1979 for Clapton's live double-album Just One Night. In 1981, Clapton recorded it with Jeff Beck during The Secret Policeman's Other Ball benefit show. A version with Joe Bonamassa appears on the 2009 video Joe Bonamassa: Live from the Royal Albert Hall. Clapton co-performed the song with Robbie Robertson during Clapton's third induction at the Rock and Roll Hall of Fame in 2000 and resurrected it for his 2007 and 2011 Asian, European and American world tours.
