= Joe Medwick (blues musician) =

American singer-songwriter

Joe Medwick (June 21, 1931 – April 12, 1992), probably born Medwick N. Veasey though some sources suggest Joe Medwick Masters or Joe Medwick Veasey, was an American rhythm and blues singer and songwriter. He is officially credited with writing relatively few songs, including "Further On Up The Road", but is widely believed to have written many others, including "I Pity the Fool" and "Turn On Your Love Light". He sold all rights over many of his songs cheaply to record label owner Don Robey. Medwick also recorded under various names including Joe Veasey, Joe Masters and Joe Melvin.

== Biography ==
An African-American, he was born in Houston, Texas, where he attended Yates High School. It is suggested that he (or his parents) adopted the name "Joe" in tribute to the baseball player Joe "Ducky" Medwick, who played for the St. Louis Cardinals from 1932 onwards. When in his teens, he sang with a gospel group, the Chosen Gospel Singers, before turning to secular music. After serving in Korea with the US Army, he returned to the Third Ward in Houston, where he performed in a blues club, Shady's Playhouse, often with pianist Teddy Reynolds (who later accompanied Bobby Bland), and increasingly spent his time writing lyrics and composing tunes for other blues musicians to sing.

According to the Texas State Historical Association:

"Medwick was often able to sell the resulting material almost immediately to local music producers. In doing so, he rarely asked for formal contracts to establish proper songwriting credit for himself, instead choosing to peddle the songs outright —thereby surrendering any rights to potential royalty payments — for ready cash. Thus, among his musician peers and industry insiders (if not always supported by publishing documentation), Medwick is commonly known to have written or co-written many songs which became hits for other artists with the writing credits typically attributed exclusively to the person who had purchased (and thereafter registered the copyrights on) the compositions."

He sold many of his songs to Don Robey, the owner of the Duke and Peacock labels whose major stars were Bobby Bland and Junior Parker. In a few cases, including "Further On Up The Road", Medwick was given a co-writing credit, though it is thought that Medwick in fact wrote the song with Johnny Copeland rather than with Robey. Copeland said: "Joe tied the record up with Mr. Robey, just as he did with every song. Joe sold Mr. Robey maybe five hundred songs, ten, fifteen dollars apiece..." In many other cases, including "I Pity the Fool", "Turn On Your Love Light", "Call On Me", "I Don't Want No Woman", "Driving Wheel", and "Cry, Cry, Cry", it is believed that Medwick wrote the songs but the credit was taken by Robey, often using his songwriting pseudonym Deadric Malone. In a 1990 interview, Medwick acknowledged his poor judgement in trading his songs for cash, while absolving Robey of any blame. He also sold his songs to other record producers in Houston, including Huey Meaux.

During the late 1950s, Medwick also recorded his own songs occasionally for Robey, and during the 1960s recorded for small local labels operated by Meaux such as Paradise, Boogaloo, and Pacemaker, using various names. It is thought that his best songs were held back from him, so that bigger stars like Bobby Bland - with whom he later fell out - could record them instead. In 1978, Huey Meaux issued a compilation LP of many of Medwick's demo recordings, Why Do Heartaches Pick On Me. After a period of obscurity, Medwick re-emerged in the 1980s as a singer with saxophonist Grady Gaines' band of Houston blues veterans, the Texas Upsetters. They released two CDs, Full Gain (1988) and Horn Of Plenty (1992).

Medwick died at his home in Houston in 1992 and was buried in Houston National Cemetery.
