= Driftin' Blues =

Blues standard

Single by Johnny Moore's Three Blazers
- B-side: "Groovy"
- Released: December 1945
- Recorded: Los Angeles, September 14, 1945
- Genre: Blues
- Length: 3:12
- Label: Philo
- Songwriter(s): Charles Brown; Eddie Williams; Johnny Moore

"Driftin' Blues" or "Drifting Blues" is a blues standard, recorded by Johnny Moore's Three Blazers in 1945. The song is a slow blues and features Charles Brown's smooth, soulful vocals and piano. It was one of the biggest blues hits of the 1940s and "helped define the burgeoning postwar West Coast blues style". "Driftin' Blues" has been interpreted and recorded by numerous artists in various styles. The Blues Foundation Hall of Fame and the Rock and Roll Hall of Fame have acknowledged the influence and lasting popularity of the song.

== Background ==
In an interview, Brown recalled that "Driftin' Blues" was "the first song that I wrote down and tried to sing". Music critic Dave Marsh noted that Brown wrote it while still in high school. Rhythm-and-blues singer Johnny Otis, who was in Bardu Ali's band with Brown in Los Angeles in the early 1940s, recalled that Brown was reluctant to record the song. Brown's inspiration for the tune was a gospel song his grandmother had taught him and he felt uneasy about mixing gospel and blues; Otis and others helped convince him to go ahead with it. An earlier blues song, "Walking and Drifting Blues", recorded by Bumble Bee Slim in 1935, includes the lyric "Now I'm driftin', like a ship without a sail". The music writer Bryan Grove noted that Brown's original working title for the song was the same and that, although he was influenced by Slim's lyrics, the songs are otherwise dissimilar.

After his stint with Ali, Brown joined the guitarist Johnny Moore and the bassist Eddie Williams. As Johnny Moore's Three Blazers, they were modeled on the Nat King Cole Trio (Moore's brother, Oscar Moore, was Cole's guitarist). They became a popular attraction at Hollywood-area nightclubs, and their style came to be known as "club blues". In contrast to jump blues, which was popular in dance halls, the style was suited to a more intimate musical setting.

== Recording and release ==
"Driftin' Blues" was a feature of Johnny Moore's Three Blazers' club repertoire. Their performances of the song were well received and led to a recording contract with Philo (soon to become Aladdin) Records. They recorded four songs at their first recording session, on September 14, 1945. To round out the trio's sound, Brown invited Otis to sit in on drums. Otis recalled that Brown used a different approach for "Driftin' Blues": "he poured his heart into the record—not in the Nat Cole manner—but in that deep and soulful style that soon had many young R&B singers trying to sound like him". Brown's vocal has also been described as "plaintive", as "lush, mellifluous", and having a "laconic grace and soothing timbre".

The song follows a twelve-bar blues chord progression and is performed at a moderately slow tempo (72 beats per minute) in the key of E (notated in 12/8 time). The instrumentation, including Moore's electric guitar solo, is understated and reflects the influence of post–World War II cool jazz. Brown described it as "a kind of melancholy type of blues, with feeling" that allowed him to tell more of a story than traditional blues. The lyrics deal with lost love, but they also reflect the alienation felt by many southern African Americans in post-war American northern and western cities:

Well, I'm drifting and I'm drifting, like a ship out on the sea
Drifting and I'm drifting, like a ship out on the sea
Well, I ain't got nobody, in this world to care for me

The song is credited to Brown, Moore, and Williams, although several commentaries discuss it as Brown's composition. According to Brown, Moore's and Williams' names were added without his consent and, being unfamiliar with copyright law, he did not challenge it. He also claimed that the group signed away their financial interest in the song for $800 and a vague promise of a share in future revenues by Philo Records. Despite having one of the biggest R&B hits of the 1940s, the group never received any additional compensation. Brown called it "the biggest mistake we ever made in our lives".

"Driftin' Blues" became a hit, spending twenty-three weeks on the Billboard Most-Played Juke Box Race Records chart. The song reached number two and "emerged [as] one of the top selling black records in 1945 and 1946". The song is included on numerous Brown compilation albums, such as the Philo–Aladdin compilations The Complete Aladdin Recordings of Charles Brown and Driftin' Blues: The Best of Charles Brown. It is also included on many collections by various artists, such as the box sets Martin Scorsese Presents the Blues: A Musical Journey and The Blues: A Smithsonian Collection of Classic Blues Singers.

== Recognition and legacy ==
"Driftin' Blues" was inducted into Blues Hall of Fame in 1989 in the category "Classics of Blues Recording", which noted that it was "one of the records that helped define the burgeoning postwar West Coast style of smooth 'lounge blues'". In 1995, it was included in the Rock and Roll Hall of Fame list of "500 Songs That Shaped Rock and Roll". During his career, Brown re-recorded the song and variations on it several times. In 1969, an updated version "came off as new, thanks to Earl Hooker's inspired slide work", according to biographer Sebastian Danchin. It is included on the album Legend! (Bluesway Records).

The song became a blues standard, and renditions have been performed and recorded by numerous artists. Some follow the original arrangement, while others interpret it differently. As early as 1946, a young Ray Charles played it regularly. He recalled, "Charles Brown was a powerful influence on me in the early part of my career, especially when I was struggling down in Florida. I made many a dollar doing my imitation of his 'Drifting Blues'. That was a hell of a number". "Driftin' Blues" entered the charts again in 1968, when Bobby "Blue" Bland recorded it. His version reached number 23 during a stay of eleven weeks on the Billboard R&B chart and also entered the broader Billboard Hot 100 at number 96.

== See also ==
- Billboard Most-Played Race Records of 1946
