= Bobby Bland =

American blues and soul singer and musician (1930–2013)

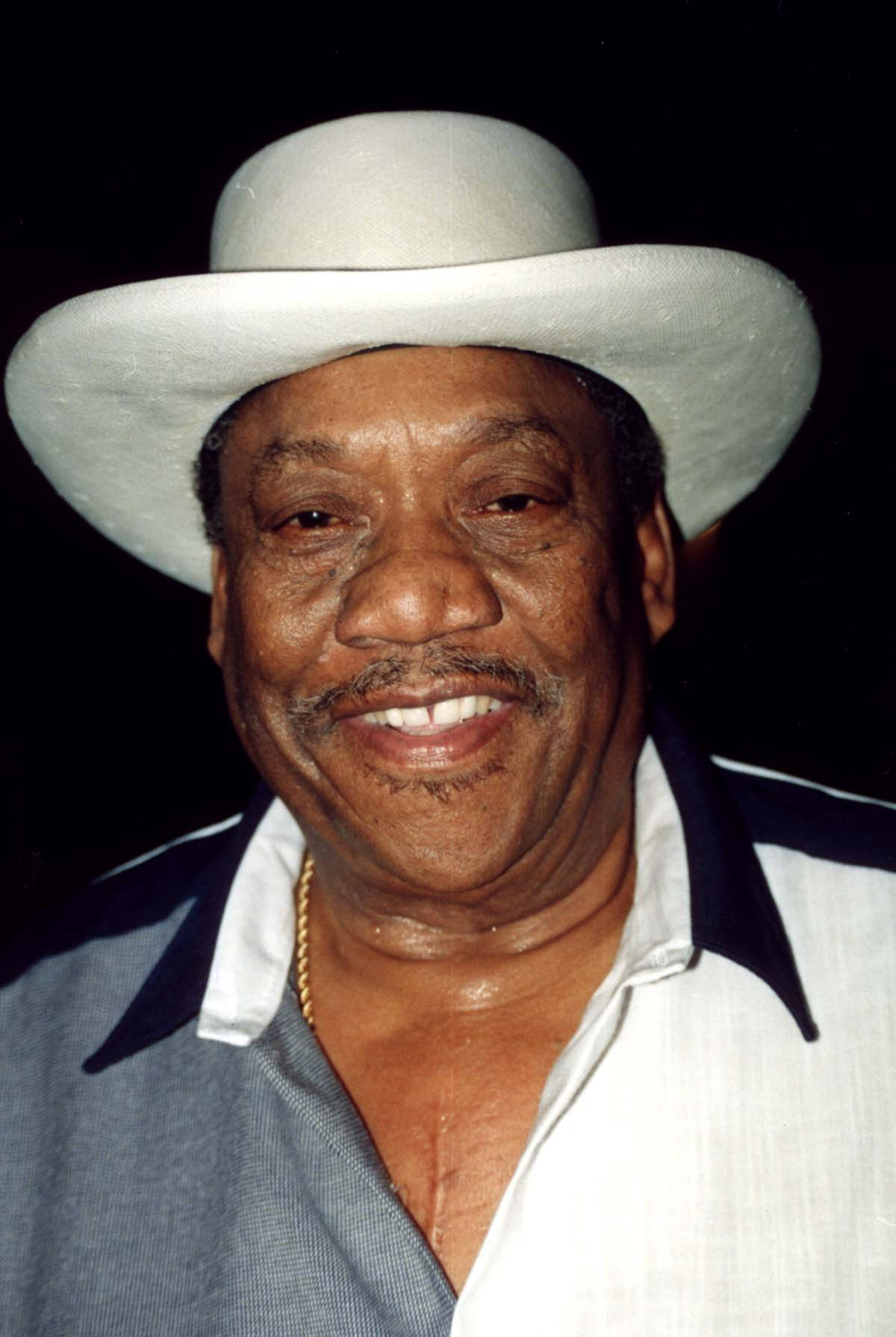
- Bland in 1998

Background information
- Also known as: Bobby "Blue" Bland; Lion of the Blues; Sinatra of the Blues
- Born: Robert Calvin Brooks; January 27, 1930; Barretville, Tennessee, U.S.
- Died: June 23, 2013 (aged 83) Germantown, Tennessee, U.S.
- Genres: Blues; soul blues; R&B; soul
- Occupations: Singer-songwriter; arranger; bandleader
- Instrument: Vocals
- Labels: Duke; ABC; MCA; Malaco

Robert Calvin Bland (born Robert Calvin Brooks; January 27, 1930 – June 23, 2013), known professionally as Bobby "Blue" Bland, was an American blues singer. Bland developed a sound that mixed gospel with the blues and R&B. He was described as "among the great storytellers of blues and soul music... [who] created tempestuous arias of love, betrayal and resignation, set against roiling, dramatic orchestrations, and left the listener drained but awed." The inspiration behind his unique style was a Detroit Preacher, CL Franklin, because Bland studied his sermons. He was sometimes referred to as the "Lion of the Blues" and as the "Sinatra of the Blues". His music was influenced by Nat King Cole.

Bland was inducted into the Blues Hall of Fame in 1981, the Rock and Roll Hall of Fame in 1992, and the Memphis Music Hall of Fame in 2012. He received the Grammy Lifetime Achievement Award in 1997. The Rock and Roll Hall of Fame described him as "second in stature only to B.B. King as a product of Memphis's Beale Street blues scene". In 2023, Rolling Stone ranked Bland at number 163 on its list of the 200 Greatest Singers of All Time.

== Life and career ==
=== Early life ===
Bland was born Robert Calvin Brooks in the small town of Barretville, Tennessee. His father, I. J. Brooks, abandoned the family not long after Robert's birth. Robert later acquired the name "Bland" from his stepfather, Leroy Bridgeforth, who was also called Leroy Bland. Robert dropped out of school in third grade to work in the cotton fields and never graduated from school.

With his mother, Bland moved to Memphis in 1947, where he started singing with local gospel groups, including the Miniatures. Eager to expand his interests, he began frequenting the city's famous Beale Street, where he became associated with a circle of aspiring musicians, including B.B. King, Rosco Gordon, Junior Parker and Johnny Ace, who collectively were known as the Beale Streeters.

=== Early career ===
In 1951, talent scout Ike Turner recorded Bland for Modern Records at Tuff Green's house in Memphis. Because Bland was illiterate, they first recorded the one song he knew, "They Call It Stormy Monday." While the recording was never released, Bland later recorded the song in 1961, which became one of his hit singles. Turner backed Bland on piano for his first two records, which were released under the name Robert Bland. Between 1951 and 1952, Bland recorded commercially unsuccessful singles for Modern and Sun Records (which licensed its recordings to Chess Records). However, these records caught the attention of Duke Records. Bland's recordings from the early 1950s show him striving for individuality, but his progress was halted for two years while he served in the U.S. Army, during which time he performed in a band with the singer Eddie Fisher.

When Bland returned to Memphis in 1954, several of his former associates, including Johnny Ace, were enjoying considerable success. He joined Ace's revue and returned to Duke Records, which was then being run by the Houston entrepreneur Don Robey. According to his biographer Charles Farley, "Robey handed Bobby a new contract, which Bobby could not read, and helped Bobby sign his name on it". The contract gave Bland just half a cent per record sold, instead of the industry standard of 2 cents.

Bland released his first single for Duke in 1955. In 1956 he began touring on the Chitlin' Circuit with Junior Parker in a revue called Blues Consolidated, initially doubling as Parker's valet and driver. He began recording for Duke with the bandleader Bill Harvey and the arranger Joe Scott, asserting his characteristic vocal style and, with Harvey and Scott, beginning to craft the melodic big-band blues singles for which he became famous, often accompanied by the guitarist Wayne Bennett. Unlike many blues musicians, Bland played no instrument.

=== Commercial success ===
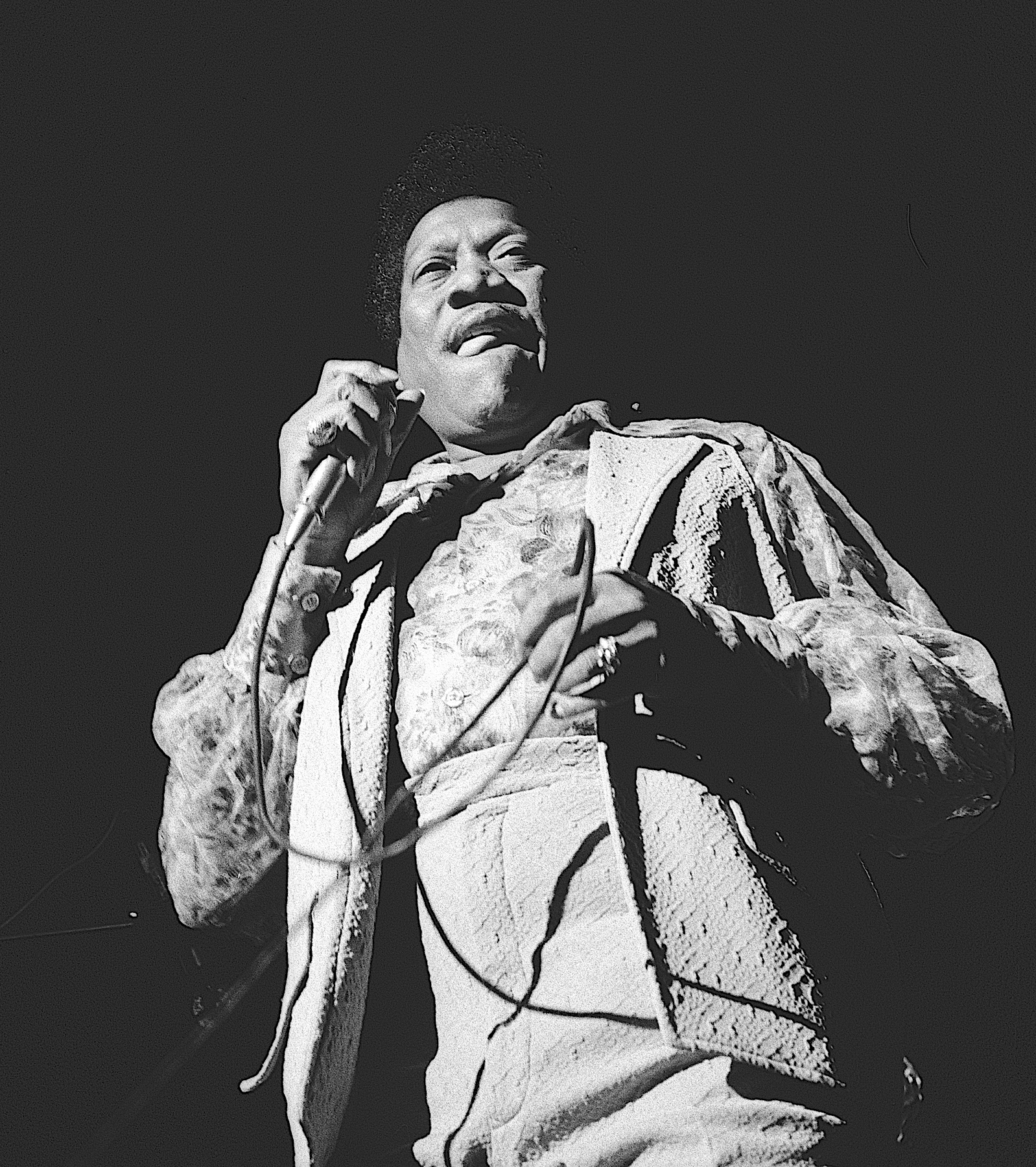
Bobby "Blue" Bland at the 1970 Ann Arbor Blues Festival

Bland's first chart success came in 1957 with "Farther Up the Road", which reached number 1 on the R&B chart and number 43 on the Billboard Hot 100. It was followed by a series of hits on the R&B chart, including "Little Boy Blue" (1958). He also recorded an album with Parker, Blues Consolidated, in 1958. Bland's craft was most clearly heard on a series of early-1960s releases, including "Cry Cry Cry", "I Pity the Fool" (number 1 on the R&B chart in 1961) and "Turn On Your Love Light", which became a much-covered standard. Despite credits to the contrary—often claimed by Robey—many of these classic works were written by Joe Scott. Bland also recorded a hit version of T-Bone Walker's "Call It Stormy Monday (But Tuesday Is Just as Bad)", which was erroneously given the title of a different song, "Stormy Monday Blues".

His last record to reach number 1 on the R&B chart was "That's the Way Love Is", in 1963, but he continued to produce a consistent run of R&B chart entries through the mid-1960s. He barely broke into the mainstream market; his highest-charting song on the pop chart, "Ain't Nothing You Can Do", peaked at number 20 in 1964, in the same week in which the Beatles held down the top five spots. Bland's records mostly sold on the R&B market rather than achieving crossover success. He had 23 top ten hits on the Billboard R&B chart. In the book Top R&B/Hip-Hop Singles: 1942–1995, by Joel Whitburn, Bland was ranked number 13 of the all-time top-charting artists.

=== Later career ===
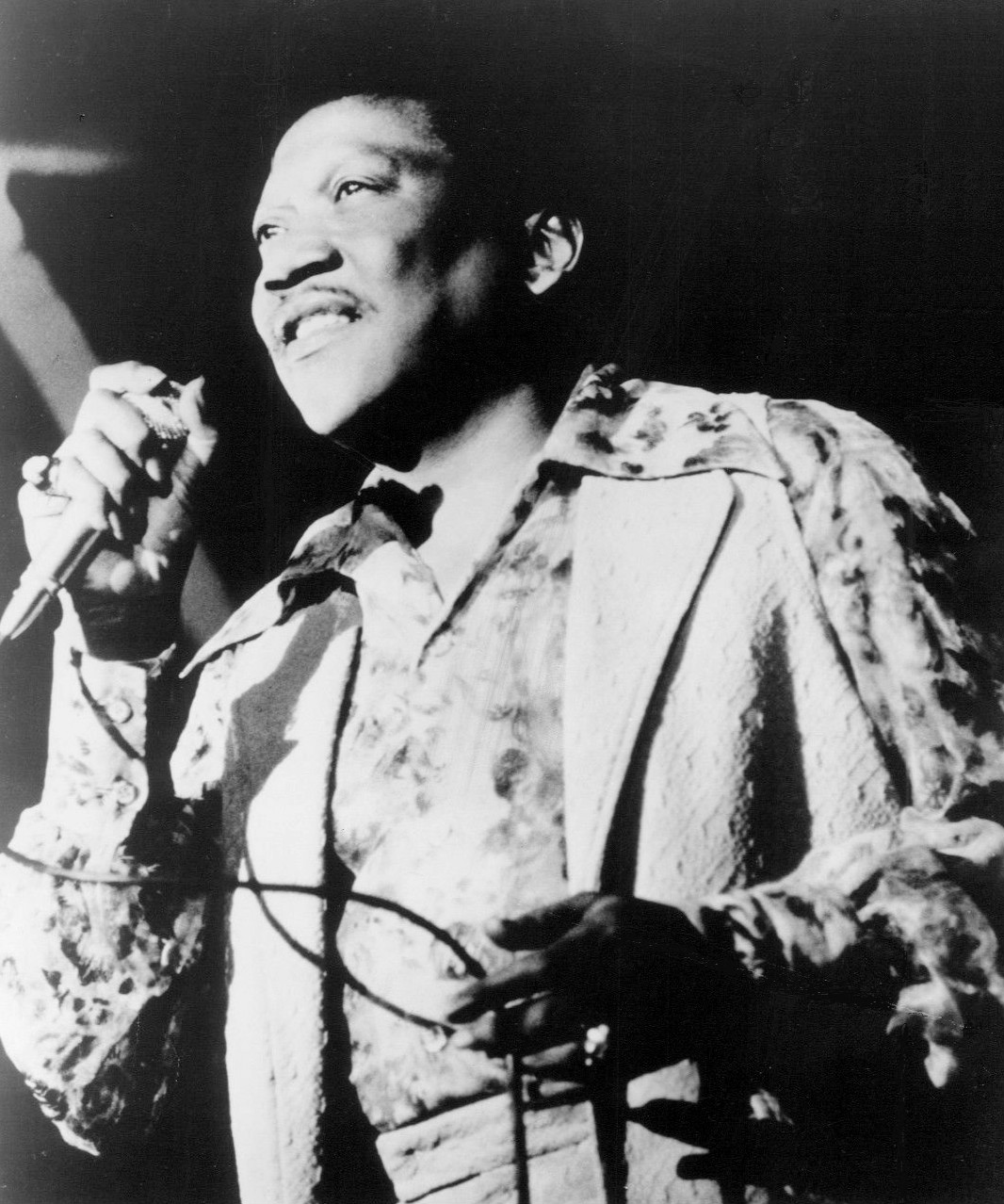
Bland, 1974

Financial pressures forced the singer to cut his touring band and in 1968 the group broke up. He suffered from depression and became increasingly dependent on alcohol, but he stopped drinking in 1971. His record company, Duke Records, was sold to the larger ABC Records group. This resulted in several successful and critically acclaimed contemporary blues and soul albums including His California Album and Dreamer, arranged by Michael Omartian and produced by ABC staffer Steve Barri. The albums, including the later "follow-up" in 1977, Reflections in Blue, were recorded in Los Angeles and featured many of the city's top session musicians at the time.

The first single released from His California Album, "This Time I'm Gone for Good" took Bland back into the pop Top 50 for the first time since 1964 and made the R&B top 10 in late 1973. The opening track from Dreamer, "Ain't No Love in the Heart of the City", was a strong R&B hit. A version of it was released in 1978 by the hard-rock band Whitesnake, featuring the singer David Coverdale. Much later, Kanye West sampled it on Jay-Z's hip-hop album The Blueprint (2001). The song is also featured on the soundtrack of the crime drama The Lincoln Lawyer (2011), starring Matthew McConaughey. The follow-up, "I Wouldn't Treat a Dog", was his biggest R&B hit for some years, climbing to number 3 in late 1974, but it reached only number 88 on the pop charts. Subsequent attempts at adding a disco flavor were mostly unsuccessful. A return to his roots in 1980 for a tribute album to his mentor Joe Scott, produced by music veterans Monk Higgins and Al Bell, resulted in the album Sweet Vibrations, but it failed to sell well outside of his traditional "chitlin circuit" base.

In 1985, Bland signed a contract with Malaco Records, specialists in traditional Southern Black music, for which he made a series of albums while continuing to tour and appear at concerts with B. B. King. In the late '70s and throughout the '80s, most blues artists were performing for white audiences; however, Bland wanted to continue performing for African American audiences and felt that signing with Malaco Records would help him to do that. The two had collaborated on two albums in the 1970s. Despite occasional age-related ill health, Bland continued to record new albums for Malaco and perform occasional tours alone, with the guitarist and producer Angelo Earl and also with B. B. King, and performed at blues and soul festivals worldwide. In 1985, Bland's album Members Only on Malaco reached number 45 on Billboard's R&B albums chart, and the title song reached number 54 for R&B singles. It was his last chart single, and became Bland's signature song for the rest of his career. Bland was inducted into the Rock and Roll Hall of Fame in 1992. The Rock and Roll Hall of Fame described him as "second in stature only to B. B. King as a product of Memphis's Beale Street blues scene".

=== Collaborations and tributes ===
Northern-Irish singer-songwriter Van Morrison was an early adherent of Bland, covering "Turn On Your Love Light" while with the band Them and later "Ain't Nothing You Can't Do" on his 1974 live album It's Too Late to Stop Now, and Bland was an occasional guest singer at Morrison's concerts. He also included a previously unreleased version of a March 2000 duet of Morrison and Bland singing "Tupelo Honey" on his 2007 compilation album, The Best of Van Morrison Volume 3.

In 2008 the British singer and lead vocalist of Simply Red, Mick Hucknall, released the album Tribute to Bobby, containing songs associated with Bland. The album reached 18 in the UK Albums Chart.

== Death ==
Bland died on June 23, 2013, at his home in Germantown, Tennessee, a suburb of Memphis, after what family members described as "an ongoing illness." He was 83. He is interred at Memorial Park Cemetery in Memphis. He is survived by his wife, Willie Martin Bland, and his son Rodd, who is also a musician. After his death, Rodd told news media that Bland had recently told him that the blues musician James Cotton was Bland's half-brother.

== Accolades ==
Bland was nominated for seven Grammy Awards in the course of his career.

He received the following honors:

- Blues Hall of Fame – inducted 1981
- Rhythm and Blues Pioneer Award – 1992
- Rock and Roll Hall of Fame – inducted 1992
- Grammy Lifetime Achievement Award – 1997
- Rhythm & Blues Foundation Lifetime Achievement Award – 1998
- Grammy Hall of Fame – "Turn On Your Love Light" (1999)
- Memphis Music Hall of Fame – inducted 2012
- National Rhythm & Blues Hall of Fame – inducted 2021

== Discography ==
=== Studio albums ===
Year	Album	Peak chart positions			Label
Year	Album	US	US R&B	US Blues	Label
May 1961	Two Steps from the Blues	–	–	–	Duke
June 1962	Here's the Man!	53	–	–	Duke
June 1963	Call on Me/That's the Way Love Is	11	–	–	Duke
1964	Ain't Nothing You Can Do	119	–	–	Duke
1966	The Soul of the Man	–	17	–	Duke
1967	Touch of the Blues	–	38	–	Duke
1969	Spotlighting the Man	–	24	–	Duke
1973	His California Album	136	3	–	Dunhill
1974	Dreamer	172	5	–	Dunhill
1975	Get On Down with Bobby Bland	154	14	–	ABC
1977	Reflections in Blue	185	47	–	ABC
1978	Come Fly with Me	185	31	–	ABC
1979	I Feel Good, I Feel Fine	187	34	–	MCA
1980	Sweet Vibrations	–	29	–	MCA
1981	Try Me, I'm Real	–	52	–	MCA
1982	Here We Go Again	–	22	–	MCA
1983	Tell Mr Bland	–	50	–	MCA
1984	You've Got Me Loving You	–	35	–	MCA
1985	Members Only	–	45	–	Malaco
1986	After All	–	65	–	Malaco
1987	Blues You Can Use	–	71	–	Malaco
1989	Midnight Run	–	26	–	Malaco
1991	Portrait of the Blues	–	50	–	Malaco
1993	Years of Tears	–	80	–	Malaco
1995	Sad Street	–	–	11	Malaco
1998	Memphis Monday Morning	–	–	12	Malaco
2003	Blues at Midnight	–	–	4	Malaco
"–" denotes releases that did not chart.

=== Live albums ===
Year	Album	Peak chart positions			Label
Year	Album	US	US R&B	US Blues	Label
1974	Together for the First Time (with B. B. King)	43	2	–	ABC
1976	Bobby Bland and B. B. King Together Again...Live	73	9	–	ABC
1998	Live on Beale Street	–	–	8	Malaco
"–" denotes releases that did not chart.

=== Collaborative album ===
- Blues Consolidated, 1958 (Duke Records) (with Junior Parker)

=== Compilations ===
- The Best of Bobby Bland, 1967 (Duke Records)
- The Best of Bobby Bland, vol. 2, 1968 (Duke Records)
- First Class Blues, 1987 (Malaco Records)
- The "3B" Blues Boy: The Blues Years 1952–1959, 1991 (Ace Records)
- I Pity the Fool: The Duke Recordings, vol. 1, 1992 (MCA)
- Turn on Your Love Light: The Duke Recordings, vol. 2, 1994 (MCA)
- That Did It!: The Duke Recordings, vol. 3, 1996 (MCA)
- Greatest Hits, Vol. 1: The Duke Recordings, 1998 (MCA, Duke/Peacock)
- Greatest Hits, Vol. 2: The ABC–Dunhill/MCA Recordings, 1998 (MCA)
- The Anthology, 2001 (MCA)
- Unmatched: The Very Best of Bobby Bland, 2011 (Malaco)
- Angel in Anguish: The Deep, Deep Soul of Bobby Blue Bland, 2013 (Fingertips)

=== Singles ===
Year	A-side	B-side	Label	Chart positions	
Year	A-side	B-side	Label	US	US R&B
1951	"Crying All Night Long"	"Dry Up Baby"	Modern	–	–
1952	"Good Lovin'"	"Drifting from Town to Town"	Modern	–	–
1952	"Crying"	"A Letter from a Trench In Korea"	Chess	–	–
1952	"Lovin' Blues"	"I.O.U. Blues"	Duke	–	–
1953	"Army Blues"	"No Blow, No Show"	Duke	–	–
1955	"Time Out"	"It's My Life Baby"	Duke	–	–
1955	"You or None"	"Woke Up Screaming"	Duke	–	–
1956	"I Can't Put You Down"	"You've Got Bad Intentions"	Duke	–	–
1956	"I Learned My Lesson"	"I Don't Believe"	Duke	–	–
1957	"Don't Want No Woman"	"I Smell Trouble"	Duke	–	–
1957	"Farther Up the Road"	"Sometime Tomorrow"	Duke	43	1
1957	"Teach Me (How to Love You)"	"Bobby's Blues"	Duke	–	–
1958	"You Got Me Where You Want Me"	"Loan a Helping Hand"	Duke	–	–
1958	"Little Boy Blue"	"Last Night"	Duke	–	10
1959	"You Did Me Wrong"	"I Lost Sight of the World"	Duke	–	–
1959	"I'm Not Ashamed"	"Wishing Well"	Duke	–	13
1959	"Is It Real"	"Someday"	Duke	–	28
1959	"I'll Take Care of You"	"That's Why"	Duke	89	2
1960	"Lead Me On"	"Hold Me Tenderly"	Duke	–	9
1960	"Cry Cry Cry"	"I've Been Wrong So Long"	Duke	71	9
1961	"I Pity the Fool"	"Close to You"	Duke	46	1
1961	"Don't Cry No More"	"Saint James Infirmary"	Duke	71	2
1961	"Turn On Your Love Light"	"You're the One (That I Need)"	Duke	28	2
1962	"Ain't That Loving You"	"Jelly, Jelly, Jelly"	Duke	86	9
1962	"Who Will the Next Fool Be"	"Blue Moon"	Duke	76	12
1962	"Yield Not to Temptation"	"How Does a Cheating Woman Feel"	Duke	56	10
1962	"Stormy Monday Blues"	"Your Friends"	Duke	43	5
1963	"That's the Way Love Is"	"Call on Me"	Duke	33 / 22	1 / 6
1963	"Sometimes You Gotta Cry a Little"	"You're Worth It All"	Duke	56	28
1963	"The Feeling Is Gone"	"I Can't Stop Singing"	Duke	91 / 106	N/A
1964	"Ain't Nothing You Can Do"	"Honey Child"	Duke	20	N/A
1964	"Share Your Love with Me"	"After It's Too Late"	Duke	42 / 111	N/A
1964	"Ain't Doing Too Bad (Part 1)"	"Ain't Doing Too Bad (Part 2)"	Duke	49	N/A
1965	"Blind Man"	"Black Night"	Duke	78 / 99	N/A
1965	"Ain't No Telling"	"Dust Got in Daddy's Eyes"	Duke	93 / 125	25 / 23
1965	"These Hands (Small but Mighty)"	"Today"	Duke	63	4
1966	"I'm Too Far Gone (To Turn Around)"	"If You Could Read My Mind"	Duke	62	8
1966	"Good Time Charlie"	"Good Time Charlie (Working His Groove Bag)"	Duke	75	6
1966	"Poverty"	"Building a Fire with Rain"	Duke	65	9
1966	"Back in the Same Old Bag Again"	"I Ain't Myself Anymore"	Duke	102	13
1967	"You're All I Need"	"Deep in My Soul"	Duke	88	16
1967	"That Did It"	"Getting Used to the Blues"	Duke	–	6
1967	"A Touch of the Blues"	"Shoes"	Duke	–	30
1968	"Driftin' Blues"	"You Could Read My Mind"	Duke	96	23
1968	"Honey Child"	"A Piece of Gold"	Duke	–	–
1968	"Save Your Love for Me"	"Share Your Love With Me"	Duke	–	16
1968	"Rockin' in the Same Old Boat"	"Wouldn't You Rather Have Me"	Duke	58	12
1969	"Gotta Get to Know You"	"Baby, I'm on My Way"	Duke	91	14
1969	"Chains of Love"	"Ask Me 'Bout Nothing (But the Blues)"	Duke	60	9
1970	"If You've Got a Heart"	"Sad Feeling"	Duke	96	10
1970	"If Love Ruled the World"	"Lover with a Reputation"	Duke	–	16 / 28
1970	"Keep On Loving Me (You'll See the Change)"	"I've Just Got to Forget About You"	Duke	89	20
1971	"I'm Sorry"	"Yum Yum Tree"	Duke	97	18
1971	"Shape Up or Ship Out"	"The Love That We Share (Is True)"	Duke	–	–
1972	"Do What You Set Out to Do"	"Ain't Nothing You Can Do"	Duke	64	6
1972	"I'm So Tired"	"If You Could Read My Mind"	Duke	–	36
1973	"This Time I'm Gone for Good"	"Where Baby Went"	Dunhill	42	5
1974	"Goin' Down Slow"	"Up and Down World"	Dunhill	69	17
1974	"Ain't No Love in the Heart of the City"	"Twenty-Four Hour Blues"	Dunhill	91	9
1974	"I Wouldn't Treat a Dog (The Way You Treated Me)"	"I Ain't Gonna Be (The First to Cry)"	Dunhill	88	3
1975	"Yolanda"	"When You Come to the End of Your Road"	ABC	104	21
1975	"I Take It On Home"	"You've Never Been This Far Before"	ABC	–	41
1976	"Today I Started Loving You Again"	"Too Far Gone"	ABC	103	34
1976	"It Ain't the Real Thing"	"Who's Foolin' Who"	ABC	–	12
1976	"Let The Good Times Roll"; Bobby Bland & B. B. King	"Strange Things Happening"	ABC Impulse	101	20
1977	"The Soul of a Man"	"If I Weren't a Gambler"	ABC	–	18
1978	"Sittin' on a Poor Man's Throne"	"I Intend to Take Your Place"	ABC	–	82
1978	"Love to See You Smile"	"I'm Just Your Man"	ABC	–	14
1978	"Come Fly with Me"	"Ain't God Something"	ABC	–	55
1979	"Tit For Tat"	"Come Fly with Me"	MCA	–	71
1980	"Soon As the Weather Breaks"	"To Be Friends"	MCA	–	76
1981	"You'd Be a Millionaire"	"Swat Vibrator"	MCA	–	92
1982	"What a Difference a Day Makes"	"Givin' Up the Streets for Love"	MCA	–	–
1982	"Recess In Heaven"	"Exactly, Where It's At"	MCA	–	40
1982	"Here We Go Again"	"You're About to Win"	MCA	–	–
1983	"Is This the Blues"	"You're About to Win"	MCA	–	–
1983	"If It Ain't One Thing"	"Tell Mr. Bland"	MCA	–	–
1984	"Looking Back"	"You Got Me Loving You"	MCA	–	–
1984	"Get Real Clean"	"It's Too Bad"	MCA	–	–
1984	"You Are My Christmas"	"New Merry Christmas Baby"	MCA	–	–
1985	"Members Only"	"I Just Got to Know"	Malaco	–	54
1986	"Can We Make Love Tonight"	"In the Ghetto"	Malaco	–	–
1988	"Get Your Money Where You Spend Your Time"	"For the Last Time"	Malaco	–	–
1988	"24 Hours a Day"	"I've Got a Problem"	Malaco	–	–
1989	"You've Got to Hurt Before You Heal"	"I'm Not Ashamed to Sing the Blues"	Malaco	–	–
1989	"Ain't No Sunshine"	"If I Don't Get Involved"	Malaco	–	–
1990	"Starting All Over Again"	"Midnight Run"	Malaco	–	–
1990	"Take Off Your Shoes"	"If I Don't Get Involved"	Malaco	–	–
1992	"She's Putting Something in My Food"	"Let Love Have Its Way"	Malaco	–	–
1993	"There's a Stranger in My House"	"Hurtin' Time Again"	Malaco	–	–
1994	"I Just Tripped on a Piece of Your Broken Heart"	"Hole in the Wall"	Malaco	–	–
1995	"Double Trouble"	"Double Trouble (long version)"	Malaco	–	–
"–" denotes releases that did not chart or were not released in that territory.
