= Wayne Bennett (blues guitarist) =

American blues guitarist (1932–1992)

- Born: Wayne Talmadge Bennett; December 13, 1932; Sulphur, Oklahoma, U.S.
- Died: November 28, 1992 (aged 59) New Orleans, Louisiana, U.S.
- Genres: Blues
- Occupation: Musician
- Instrument: Guitar

Wayne Talmadge Bennett (December 13, 1932 – November 28, 1992) was an American blues guitarist, best remembered for his performances and recordings with Bobby Bland between the 1950s and 1980s.

== Biography ==
Bennett was born in Sulphur, Oklahoma, later moving with his parents to Ardmore. He started playing guitar in his teens, and performed in local bands. In 1950, he joined Amos Milburn's band, and made his first recordings with Milburn in California, on tracks including "Bad, Bad, Whiskey" and "One Bourbon, One Scotch, One Beer".

In the early 1950s Bennett moved to Chicago, where he played in King Kolax's band, and toured with The Moonglows. He also recorded in the mid-1950s with such blues musicians as Otis Rush, Buddy Guy, Arbee Stidham, Jimmy Reed, and Elmore James. He spent several years in the late 1950s touring and recording with the Five Blind Boys of Mississippi, before starting his working relationship with Bobby Bland. He also studied different styles of guitar. Some of Bennett's training included studying guitar with Harry Volpe in New York City for two years; studying harmony with Nate Griffin in Chicago for one year; studying harmony with Junior Mance in Chicago for two years; and studying harmony and ear training with Tony Hanson in Cleveland, Ohio for one year.

He played and recorded with Bobby Bland between the late 1950s and the mid-1960s, and became known for his jazz-tinged blues guitar work. His solo on "Stormy Monday" on Bland's album Here's The Man is still considered by multiple guitarists to be a classic, drawing both from T-Bone Walker and jazz influences. Another standout solo on Bland's "Wishing Well" displays a compelling virtuosity in the blues idiom that would become a model for young guitarists in England such as Eric Clapton who would become part of the British Invasion of the 1960s.

Bennett himself never liked to claim to be a blues player, preferring instead to be as versatile as he could be, and taking pride in being able to quote from a wide variety of popular music, including TV theme songs. In his earlier years he played a Gibson Byrdland hollow-body, but in later years he was also seen playing a custom Tom Holmes Cadillac solid-body.

In 1965 he joined the Red Saunders band at the Regal Theater in Chicago, and cut his own record in 1968, an instrumental called "Casanova, Your Playing Days are Over" on the now defunct Brunswick label. He was part of Operation Breadbasket in the late 1960s, and worked with jazz musicians, including Cannonball Adderley, Sonny Stitt and Dexter Gordon, as well as later with the Chi-Lites, the Lost Generation, The Hues Corporation; among a number of others.

At one time or another Bennett was also a member of the house orchestra at the Apollo in New York, the Howard in Washington, D.C., the Uptown Theatre in Philadelphia and the Royal Theatre in Baltimore. He started playing with Bobby Bland again in the mid-1970s, remaining with him until the mid-1980s. In 1990, he played on Willy DeVille's album Victory Mixture.

In 1992, Bennett died in the Veterans Administration Hospital, New Orleans, from heart failure, a week before a scheduled replacement could be transplanted, at the age of 59. Bennett was inducted into the Oklahoma Jazz Hall of Fame in 2001. In 2018 the Killer Blues Headstone Project placed a headstone for him in Providence Cemetery in New Orleans.

== Discography ==
=== Solo ===
- "Casanova, Your Playing Days are Over" (1967)

=== With others ===
- Sam McClain and Soul Purpose – 1 album
- Ramsey Lewis – Columbia – 1
- Tyrone Davis – Dakar-Brunswick – 5
- Bobby Bland – Duke-Peacock – 8
- The Chi-Lites – Brunswick – 4
- Jackie Wilson – Brunswick – 4
- The Lost Generation – Brunswick – 2
- Hamilton Bohannon – Brunswick – 3
- Independents – Scepter – 1
- Jerry Butler – Mercury – 1
- Five Blind Boys – Peacock – 2
- Soul Stirrers – GRT/Chess – 1
- Mighty Clouds of Joy – GRT/Chess – 2
- Salem Travelers – GRT/Chess – 1
- Fats Domino – Imperial – 1
- Operation Breadbasket – Chess – 2
- Little Junior Parker – United Artist – 1
- James Cotton – 3
- Zuzu Bollin – 1

With Jimmy McGriff

- Groove Grease (Groove Merchant, 1971)

With Jimmy Reed

- Big Boss Man (BluesWay, 1968)
- Down in Virginia (BluesWay, 1969)
