= Don Robey =

American entertainment executive (1903–1975)

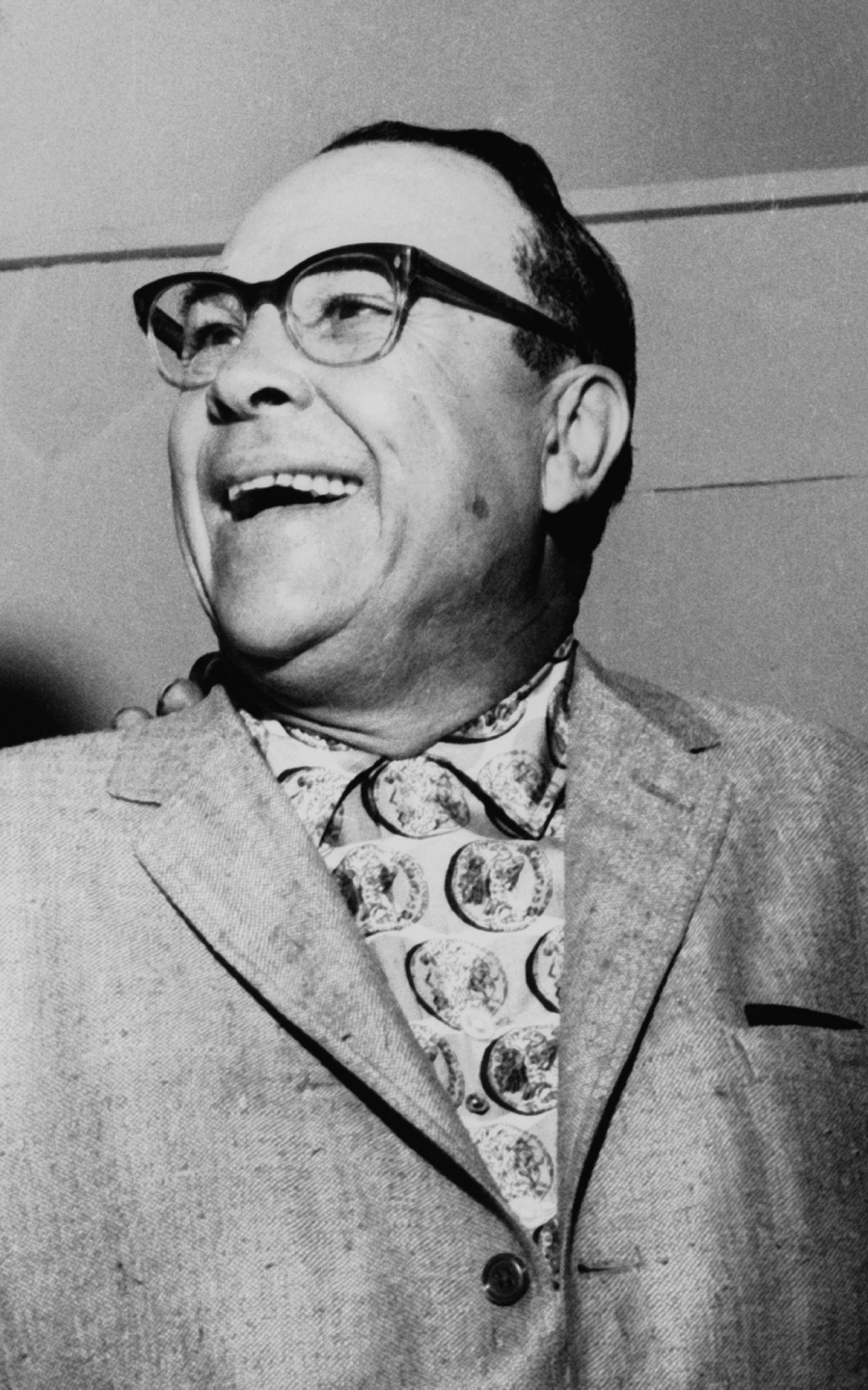
- Born: Don Deadric Robey; November 1, 1903; Houston, Texas, United States
- Died: June 16, 1975 (aged 71); Houston, Texas
- Other names: Deadric Malone
- Occupations: Businessman, record company and nightclub owner, record producer, credited as songwriter
- Known for: Peacock Records, Duke Records

Don Deadric Robey (November 1, 1903 – June 16, 1975) was an American record label executive, songwriter, and record producer. As the founder of Peacock Records and the eventual owner of Duke Records, he was responsible for developing the careers of many rhythm and blues artists in the 1950s and 1960s. He was the first African American record mogul, 10 years prior to Berry Gordy's Motown label (though the first Black-owned label, Black Swan Records, belonged to Harry Pace in the 1920s).

Robey was notorious for his controversial business practices; he reputedly used criminal means, including violence and intimidation, as part of his business model, though he was held in high regard by some of the musicians who worked for him. He was credited with writing or co-writing many of the songs recorded by Duke/Peacock artists, either under his real name, or under the pseudonym of Deadric Malone. However, in many cases, he was merely a publisher and was not involved in the writing. Many other label owners paid little for songs and controlled the publishing, but Robey was one of the few to disguise the real writers, making it nearly impossible to assess who wrote what on Duke, Peacock, Back Beat, and his other labels.

== Early life and career ==
Robey was born in the Fifth Ward of Houston, Texas, United States, to a Jewish mother Gertrude and an African American father Zeb Robey, a chef. His grandfather Franklin, the son of a plantation owner and a slave from South Carolina, had settled in Houston where he practiced medicine and lived in the town's Third Ward. Don Robey left school early, he claimed to pursue a gambling career. Although he claimed to have lived almost all his life in Houston, there is evidence that he spent some time in his teens working on a cotton farm with his mother, and later worked as a dock laborer in Galveston. He also lived in Los Angeles, where he set up his first nightclub. By the age of 20, he had married and fathered a son.

After returning to Houston, Don Robey worked as a sales representative for a liquor distributor. During the early and mid 1930s, he established himself in Houston's black business community, first by starting a taxi service and then opening his first amusement parlor, the Sweet Dreams Cafe in 1933 in the Fifth Ward. In 1934, he opened the Lenox Club. Around that time, he changed the name of the Sweet Dreams Cafe to Manhattan Club and began to hire bands from out of state for entertainment. Together with partner Morris Merritt he opened the Harlem Grill, a large dance hall, where he hired, among other acts, Walter Barnes and his band as well as Don Albert. In 1941 he began building a relationship with Indianapolis promoter Denver Ferguson.

== Involvement in music business ==
In 1945 he opened the Bronze Peacock Dinner Club, where he soon began to promote dances. The Peacock featured stars such as Ruth Brown, Louis Jordan, Lionel Hampton, and T-Bone Walker, and also permitted illegal gambling. Houston historian Roger Wood described the club as "arguably the most sophisticated African American owned and operated nightclub in the south during the 1940s and 1950s. It hired only the most prestigious chefs and offered an extensive menu of fine food and drink. Its roomy stage hosted productions featuring the leading uptown musical acts of the era... It catered exclusively to an adult clientele with relatively exquisite tastes in music, food and fashion... people with money to spend and a desire to do so in high style."

Robey became manager for blues singer Clarence "Gatemouth" Brown in 1947, setting up the Buffalo Booking Agency with Merritt and business manager Evelyn Johnson. Two years later, after Brown had failed to find commercial success with his recordings on the Aladdin label, Robey established Peacock Records, with Brown as his first artist. Although, according to Johnson, "Robey didn't know a record from a hubcap", he found success both with Brown and with other R&B artists, the biggest success coming with Big Mama Thornton's number one hit, "Hound Dog". The label also provided Little Richard with his second recording contract, after he left RCA Camden.

In 1952, Robey merged his Peacock label with Duke Records of Memphis, and Duke-Peacock was born. Robey took over full ownership of the label the following year, and closed down the Bronze Peacock club to turn it into a rehearsal and recording studio. Initially the Duke-Peacock company's biggest star was Johnny Ace, but after Ace's death the gap was filled by other musicians including Junior Parker, Bobby Bland, and Johnny Otis. Besides blues and R&B, Robey's label was responsible for issuing gospel music, with successful artistes such as the Dixie Hummingbirds, the Mighty Clouds of Joy, the Five Blind Boys of Mississippi, and the Swan Silvertones. Robey also started Back Beat, an R&B label that had hits with O. V. Wright and Roy Head. He later also acquired other labels including Sure Shot and Song Bird.

== Business practices ==
The performers on Robey's labels were often signed to exclusive booking and management contracts. Under the pseudonym Deadric Malone (derived from his own middle name and his wife's maiden name), he gave himself songwriting credits for many of the songs recorded on his labels, so acquiring the publishing royalties for himself. He often bought the publishing rights to songs written by musicians, and claimed full or part writing credits, described as "a devious business practice not unique to Robey." For example, Robey is credited with co-writing "Farther Up the Road" with Joe Medwick Veasey, which was initially a hit for Bobby "Blue" Bland in 1957, and later became a live staple for Eric Clapton. Robey also claimed credit for writing Bland's "I Pity the Fool", which it is suggested was in fact also written by Veasey, and "Turn On Your Love Light", which became popular with Van Morrison and his band Them in live sets, Bob Seger on Smokin' O.P.'s, the Grateful Dead in their live sets, and the Blues Brothers on the soundtrack for Blues Brothers 2000.

During the 1950s, Robey owned what was described as the most successful black-owned record business in America. His business interests also included a record store, pressing plant, print shop, and another nightclub, the Continental Showcase. His business practices were controversial. According to Jerry Leiber of the songwriting team of Leiber and Stoller, Robey was a gangster who managed his various entertainment enterprises using violence, the threat of violence, and murder. His business partner Evelyn Johnson said of Robey: "He always wore a gun. I think he was impressing himself, because he had no notches in those guns. It was an image he was living up to." Blues guitarist Pete Mayes said: “I have nothing but the best of things to say about Don Robey. He did so much for so many of us.” Singer Roy Head said: “Singers loved him. Writers were the ones who got screwed. He was bad about that. Most of those songs were written by other people. Don would give them 25 or 50 bucks and they'd let him have their songs.” Gatemouth Brown said of him: “He pulled off something in America that no one else ever pulled off. We had the only world-renowned black recording company.”

== Later life and death ==
Robey sold his record labels to ABC Dunhill Records in 1973, while remaining as a consultant. He died of a heart attack at St. Luke's Hospital in Houston in June 1975.
