= List of Ike & Tina Turner live performances =

This article contains information about the live performances of the American musical duo Ike & Tina Turner.

As the Ike & Tina Turner Revue, later billed as the Ike & Tina Turner Explosion, they were regarded as one of the most dynamic musical acts, which included the Kings of Rhythm band and backing vocalists/dancers the Ikettes.

== History ==
In 1954, musician Ike Turner relocated his band the Kings of Rhythm from Clarksdale, Mississippi to St. Louis, Missouri. Turner performed around the greater St. Louis area and built a strong following. In 1956, Ann Bullock joined Turner's band as a vocalist after he heard her sing at Club Manhattan in East St. Louis, Illinois. She was credited as Little Ann on their first recording together in 1958. She was later given the stage name Tina Turner and they released their first song as Ike & Tina Turner in 1960. When the single became a hit, they began performing as the Ike & Tina Turner Revue. They embarked on a grueling series of one-nighters throughout the United States on the Chitlin' Circuit. They relocated to Los Angeles, California in 1962. In 1966, the Turners visited England for the first time to join the Rolling Stones on their British Tour. In 1969, they began headlining in Las Vegas, Nevada. They gained further exposure by performing at music festivals and joining the Rolling Stones for select dates on their American Tour. The revue continued to expand its audience by performing in Africa, Asia, and throughout Europe until they disbanded in 1976.

== List of live performances ==
=== 1950s ===
When Ike Turner moved to East St. Louis, his first gig was at Ned Loves in 1954. Soon after he would become the house band at the Club Manhattan in East St. Louis, Illinois. In the next few years, he would perform at various clubs on different days of the week. These clubs included the Club DeLisa in St. Louis, Missouri, and Kingsbury's in Madison, Illinois.

==== 1956 ====
Date	City	Country	Venue	Notes
January 1956	East St. Louis, IL	United States	Club Manhattan	
January–February, 1956	St. Louis, MO	United States	Latin Quarter	Beginning January 18 every Monday and Tuesday; located at 814 N. Grand
January 1956	St. Louis, MO	United States	The Birdcage	Live broadcasts on Saturdays for KSTL DJ Dave Dixon's radio show
March 1956	East St. Louis, IL	United States	Club Manhattan	
March 29, 1956	St. Louis, MO	United States	Masonic Temple	St. Louis American Cooking School and Home Show
April 9, 1956	St. Louis, MO	United States	Club Riviera	Musicians Dance and Celebrity Night benefit
June 8, 1956	St. Louis, MO	United States	Club Bolo	The Igoe Guys and Dolls dance promotion
August 10, 1956	St. Louis, MO	United States	Laclede Theatre	
August–September 1956	St. Louis, MO	United States	Latin Quarter	Every Tuesday and Wednesday
October 1956	St. Louis, MO	United States	Latin Quarter	Every Tuesday, Wednesday, Friday and Saturday
October 30, 1956	St. Louis, MO	United States	West End Waiters Club	The Jolly Jester Pre-Halloween Frolic
November 4, 1956	St. Louis, MO	United States	American Hall	Show with the Gay-Cettes
November 20, 1956	St. Louis, MO	United States	Peacock Alley	
November 21, 1956	St. Louis, MO	United States	American Hall	Bill Bailey's Pre-Thanksgiving Dance with Billy Gayles, Little Milton and his House Rockers
December 1956	Chicago, IL	United States	Crown Propellor Lounge	One-week engagement
December 28, 1956	St. Louis, MO	United States	Grand Masonic Hall	Annual Holiday Breakfast Dance with Roosevelt Marks

==== 1957 ====
Date	City	Country	Venue	Notes
February 8, 1957	St. Louis, MO	United States	Masonic Temple	Located at 4525 Olive St
May 4, 1957	St. Louis, MO	United States	Club Riviera	4th Annual Coronation of a Kind and Queen of '57
May 25, 1957	St. Louis, MO	United States	Club Riviera	
June 8, 1957	St. Louis, MO	United States	Club Riviera	
June 15, 1957	St. Louis, MO	United States	Club Riviera	
June 16, 1957	St. Louis, MO	United States	Club Riviera	
August 1957	St. Louis, MO	United States	Club DeLisa	A renovated tavern in the 600 block of N. Vandeventer
November 26, 1957	St. Louis, MO	United States	Dynaflow Inn	Show with the Light Foot Brothers, Sister and Jo-Jo

==== 1958 ====
	City	Country	Venue	Notes
February 13, 1958	Roxana, IL	United States	Central School Auditorium	Teen Town Valentine Dance
February 14, 1958	St. Louis, MO	United States	Club Riviera	Hubbard's Business College Valentines Band Stand
February 16, 1958	St. Louis, MO	United States	Casa Loma Ballroom	
February 19, 1958	St. Louis, MO	United States	Dynaflow Inn	
February 1958	St. Louis, MO	United States	Club DeLisa	
April 25, 1958	St. Louis, MO	United States	West End Waiters Club	
August 31-September 1, 1958	Willwood, MO	United States	Fox Creek	2-day picnic
September 20, 1958	St. Louis, MO	United States	Casa Loma Ballroom	
October 9, 1958	St. Louis, MO	United States	Kiwanis YMCA Teen Town	
November 1958	St. Louis, MO	United States	Havana Club	Every Thursday
December 12, 1958	St. Louis, MO	United States	Club Riviera	18th Ward Regular Democratic Organization Annual Christmas Charity Dance
December 19, 1958	St. Louis, MO	United States	Masonic Temple	Elks of Saint Louis Charity Ball

==== 1959 ====
Date	City	Country	Venue	Notes
January 1959	St. Louis, MO	United States	Havana Club	Every Monday and Thursday
February 1959	St. Louis, MO	United States	Thunderbolt Lounge	Saturday nights
March 20, 1959	St. Louis, MO	United States	Thunderbolt Lounge	
March 1959	Hazelwood, MO	United States	Aero Inn	Every Wednesday
April 1959	St. Louis, MO	United States	Thunderbolt Lounge	Saturday nights
May 1959	Jefferson City, MO	United States	Recreation Building	Lincoln University
May 6–7, 1959	Jefferson City, MO	United States	Hillbilly Village	Show on May 7 reserved for Colored spectators
May 9, 1959	St. Louis	United States	Thunderbolt Lounge	
May 16, 1959	St. Louis	United States	Sumner High School Auditorium	Teenage Show with Jackie Wilson, Chuck Berry, Little Milton, and Little Bobby Foster
May 22, 1959	St. Louis	United States	Carpenter's Hall	Spring Dance
May 1959	St. Louis	United States	Aero Inn	Every Wednesday
June 26, 1959	Jefferson City, MO	United States	Jeffersonian Club	
July–August 1959	St. Louis, MO	United States	Havana Club	Every Monday and Thursday
July–August 1959	St. Louis, MO	United States	Thunderbolt Lounge	Every Wednesday and Saturday
August 23, 1958	Brooklyn, IL	United States	Harlem Club	Democratic Club of Lovejoy Homecoming
September 18, 1959	St. Louis, MO	United States	Union Theatre	Dave Dixon's Shower of Stars with the Miracles, Little Bobby Foster, and Floyd Ryland
September 1958	St. Louis, MO	United States	Thunderbolt Lounge	Every Wednesday, Friday and Saturday
October 7, 1959	St. Louis, MO	United States	Thunderbolt Lounge	
October 10, 1959	St. Louis, MO	United States	Club Riviera	Oriental Lodge of Elks 25th Anniversary
October 1959	Wellston, MO	United States	Lindy's Ballroom	Every Sunday
November 1, 1959	Madison, IL	United States	Kingsbury's Tavern	
November 8, 1959	St. Louis, MO	United States	Kiel Opera House	Dave Dixon's Shower of Stars with Chuck Berry, Little Milton, the Sheppards, Equadors, and Tommy Hodge
November 8, 1959	St. Louis, MO	United States	Lindy's Ballroom	
November 13, 1959	St. Louis, MO	United States	Club Riviera	Guys and Dolls Dance Party

=== 1960s ===
==== 1960 ====
Date	City	Country	Venue	Notes
January 1960	Collinsville, IL	United States	Collinsville Park Ballroom	Every Friday
February 7, 1960	Collinsville, IL	United States	Collinsville Park Ballroom	
March 1960	Madison, IL	United States	Kingsbury's K Bar	
April 1, 1960	St. Louis, MO	United States	Thunderbolt Lounge	
April 8, 1960	St. Louis, MO	United States	Thunderbolt Lounge	
April 30, 1960	St. Louis, MO	United States	Thunderbolt Lounge	
May 6, 1960	Columbia, MO	United States	Dormitory Cafeteria	Dormitory A spring dance
May 7, 1960	St. Louis, MO	United States	Thunderbolt Lounge	
June 1960	St. Louis, MO	United States	Thunderbolt Lounge	Every Friday
September 5, 1960	Wentzville, MO	United States	Double H-H Country Club	
September 23–29, 1960	New York, NY	United States	Apollo Theater	4 shows each day at 12:30 pm, 3:30 pm, 6:30 pm & 9:30 pm. Show with Hank Ballard, Bobby Marchan, and Joe Tex
September 30-October 6, 1960	Washington, D.C.	United States	Howard Theatre	Show with Brook Benton, Shirley Scott Trio, The Vibrations, Jackie "Moms" Mabley, and Rick Henderson All Stars
October 7, 1960	New York, NY	United States	Rockland Palace	Breakfast Dance Spectacular
October 7, 1960	Fairless Hills, PA	United States	Fairless Hills Vol. Fire Co.	Show with the Demensions, Dion, the Jordan Brothers, Tommy De Noble, and Barbara Gray
October 14, 1960	Louisville, KY	United States	Jefferson County Armory	Show with Jackie Wilson
October 15, 1960	Cleveland, OH	United States	Public Hall Ballroom	Show with Jackie Wilson and the Ramblers
October 16, 1960	Saginaw, MI	United States	Cio Hall	Show with Jackie Wilson
October 22, 1960	Santa Monica, CA	United States	Pacific Ocean Park	
October 31, 1960	Salinas, CA	United States	Salinas Armory	Halloween Dance
November 6, 1960	San Francisco, CA	United States	Fillmore Auditorium	
November 10, 1960	Phoenix, AZ	United States	Calderon Ballroom	
November 13, 1960	Los Angeles, CA	United States	Hollywood Palladium	Show with Earl Grant, Etta Jones, and James Moody band
November 23, 1960	Omaha, NE	United States	Dreamland	
November 25-December 1, 1960	Chicago, IL	United States	Regal Theater	Headlining with Bill Black, Sugar Pie DeSanto, The Clovers, Dolores Coleman, Larry Williams, and Jimmy Ricks
December 3, 1960	Jackson, MS	United States	Masonic Temple	

==== 1961 ====
Date	City	Country	Venue	Notes
January 27-February 5, 1961	Philadelphia, PA	United States	Uptown Theater	Kae Williams' 14th Anniversary Radios Show with the Coasters, Buster Brown, Tarheel Slim & Little Ann, Donnie Elbert, Pigmeat Markham & Co.
February 17–23, 1961	Washington, D.C.	United States	Howard Theatre	Show with the Coasters, Chuck Jackson, The Capris, Leonard Reed, and Lois Blaine
February 25, 1961	Dayton, OH	United States	Skatemoor Arena	Gala Dawn Dance
March 16–17, 1961	Jackson, MS	United States	Stevens Rose Room	Event to honor teachers attending the Mississippi Teachers Association
March 18, 1961	Greenville, MS	United States	Serine Lodge	
April 7, 1961	Charlotte, NC	United States	Charlotte Park Center	Springtime Revue with Jerry Butler, The Miracles, and Screamin' Jay Hawkins
April 8, 1961	Columbia, SC	United States	Columbia Township Auditorium	Springtime Revue with Jerry Butler, The Miracles, and Screamin' Jay Hawkins. Show for white spectators
April 9, 1961	Atlanta, GA	United States	Magnolia Ballroom	Springtime Revue with Jerry Butler and The Miracles, and Screamin' Jay Hawkins
April 21–24, 1961	New Orleans, LA	United States	Dew Drop Cafe	Show with Al "TNT" Braggs, 5 Dukes of Rhythm, Pat Taylor, Lady Foxy, the Exotic, and Buddy Williams' Band
April 28-May 4, 1961	New York, NY	United States	Apollo Theater	Show with Little Willie John, Mickey & Sylvia, and the Upsetters
May 19, 1961	Portsmouth, VA	United States	Sunset Lake Park	Grand opening of New Sunset Lake Park
June 9–15, 1961	Washington, D.C.	United States	Howard Theatre	Show with the Olympics, Big Maybelle, Little Jimmy Dee, Freddie & Flo, and Billy Gayles
July 3, 1961	Charleston, WV	United States	Charleston Municipal Auditorium	
July 4, 1961	Beckley, WV	United States	Recreation Building	
July 5, 1961	Logan, WV	United States	Logan Armory	
September 22, 1961	Columbia, MO	United States	Paradise Club	
September 25, 1961	St. Louis, MO	United States	Club Riviera	Teenagers' Dance 5 P.M. to 8 P.M., Adults' Dance 9 P.M. to 1 A.M.
September 29, 1961	Stockton, CA	United States	Memorial Auditorium	
October 8, 1961	Olympia, WA	United States	Evergreen Ballroom	
October 19, 1961	Phoenix, AZ	United States	Calderon Ballroom	
October 30, 1961	Raleigh, NC	United States	Raleigh Memorial Auditorum	Fall Festival of Stars with Ben E. King, Chuck Jackson, Ted Taylor, Simms Twins, and Lee Dorsey
November 7, 1961	Oklahoma City, OK	United States	Bryant Center Auditorium	Fall Festival of Stars with Ben E. King, Chuck Jackson, Lee Dorsey
November 17, 1961	High Point, NC	United States	The Music Box	Show with Bem. E. King, Ted Taylor, Gene Pitney, Lee Dorsey, and Chuck Jackson
November 20, 1961	Macon, GA	United States	Macon City Auditorium	Fall Festival of Stars with Chuck Jackson, Ted Taylor, Lee Dorsey, the Simms Twins
December 1, 1961	Charleston, WV	United States	Charleston Municipal Auditorium	Fall Festival of Stars with Freddy Cannon, Chuck Berry, the Drifters, Lee Dorsey, the Cleftones, the Mar-Keys, Baby Washington, and Simms Twins. 2 shows at 7:30pm & 10pm
December 2, 1961	Knoxville, TN	United States	Chilhowee Park Auditorium	Show with Freddie Cannon, Chuck Berry, the Drifters, the Mar-Keys, and Lee Dorsey
December 9, 1961	Lansing, MI	United States	American Legion Hall	
December 19, 1961	St. Louis, MO	United States	Club Imperial	
December 25, 1961	Detroit, MI	United States	Arcadia Roller Rink	Christmas teenage dance with Ty Hunter, the Royal Jokers, the Temptations, the Del-Phis, John Lee Hooker, the Drifters, the Lincoln Trio, Henry Lumpkin, and Tony Clarke
December 29, 1961	Oklahoma City, OK	United States	Bryant Center Auditorium	
December 31, 1961	Long Beach, CA	United States	Long Beach Municipal Auditorium	New Year's Eve Memorial Dance dedicated to Ritchie Valens with the Beach Boys, the Rivingtons, and the Carlos Brothers

==== 1962 ====
Date	City	Country	Venue	Notes
February 7, 1962	St. Petersburg, FL	United States	Melrose Park Club House	Dance sponsored by Socialite Federated Club
February 10, 1962	Jackson, MS	United States	Elks Home	The State Elks Ball
February 13, 1962	Durham, NC	United States	Durham Armory	Big Valentine Show and Dance
February 16–25, 1962	Philadelphia, PA	United States	Uptown Theater	Georgie Woods Gala Re-Opening Show with Redd Foxx, Chuck Jackson, Tommy Hunt, Gene Chandler, the Jive Five, the Starlites and the Tabs
March 23, 1962	Stockton, CA	United States	Memorial Auditorium	
March 27, 1962	Klamath Falls, OR	United States	Klamath Falls Auditorium	
March 29, 1962	Pasco, WA	United States	Tri-City Center	
April 1, 1962	Olympia, WA	United States	Evergreen Ballroom	
April 6, 1962	Modesto, CA	United States	California Ballroom	
April 22, 1962	Phoenix, AZ	United States	Abel Hall	
May 11, 1962	Oklahoma City, OK	United States	Bryant Center Auditorium	
June 1, 1962	Dayton, OH	United States	Wampler Ballarena	
July 27, 1962	Phoenix, AZ	United States	Calderon Ballroom	
August 3, 1962	Macon, GA	United States	Macon City Auditorium	Concert with Ted Taylor, Jimmy McCracklin, and The Isley Brothers
August 22, 1962	Klamath Falls, OR	United States	Klamath Falls Auditorium	
August 31, 1962	Oklahoma City, OK	United States	Bryant Center Auditorium	
October 7, 1962	Cincinnati, OH	United States	Castle Farms Club	Shows with Aretha Franklin
October 14, 1962	Dayton, OH	United States	Wampler's Ballroom	Shows with Aretha Franklin
October 25, 1962	Knoxville, TN	United States	Chilhowee Park Auditorium	
November 2–8, 1962	Washington, D.C.	United States	Howard Theatre	4 shows each day at 2 pm, 4:45 pm, 7:30 pm & 10 pm. Show with Jerry Butler, Gladys Knight, the Jive Five, and Godfrey Cambridge
November 9–15, 1962	New York, NY	United States	Apollo Theater	Show with Jerry Butler, Gladys Knight, and the Jive Five
November 22-December 2, 1962	Philadelphia, PA	United States	Uptown Theater	Georgie Woods 8th Anniversary Show with Jerry Butler, the Impressions, the 5 Royals, Flip Wilson, the Majors, the Pips
December 7, 1962	Evansville, IL	United States	The Coliseum	
December 21, 1962	Oklahoma City, OK	United States	Bryant Center Auditorium	Pre-Christmas Dance
December 30, 1962	Sacramento, CA	United States	Cocoanut Grove Ballroom	Located at 5610 Blvd

==== 1963 ====
Date	City	Country	Venue	Notes
February 8, 1963	Oakland, CA	United States	Oakland Auditorium	Show with Bobby "Blue" Bland and Marvin Gaye
February 21, 1963	Springfield, OR	United States	The Cascade	
February 25, 1963	Vancouver, BC	Canada	The Blues Palace	
March 5, 1963	Phoenix, AZ	United States	Calderon Ballroom	
March 15, 1963	Oklahoma City, OK	United States	Bryant Center Auditorium	
March 26, 1963	St. Louis, MO	United States	Club Imperial	Show with Bob Kuban and the In Men
March 1963	Columbus, MO	United States	Paradise Club	
April 22, 1963	Louisville, KY	United States	The Cherry Inn	
May 4, 1963	Louisville, KY	United States	West End Roller Drome	Derby night
July 4, 1963	Portsmouth, VA	United States	Sunset Lake Park	
July 6, 1963	Beckley, WV	United States	Armory Fieldhouse	
July 7, 1963	Logan, WV	United States	Foster Armory	
July 9, 1963	St. Louis, MO	United States	Club Imperial	
August 2, 1963	Memphis, TN	United States	New Daisy Theatre	
August 13, 1963	Victoria, TX	United States	Victoria Sportatorium	
August 22, 1963	Phoenix, AZ	United States	Calderon Ballroom	
September 7, 1963	Vancouver, BC	Canada	Danceland	
September 9, 1963	Springfield, OR	United States	The Cascade	
October 25, 1963	Oklahoma City, OK	United States	Bryant Center Auditorium	
November 18, 1963	Lexington, KY	United States	Holiday Lanes Ballroom	
November 19–20, 1963	St. Louis, MO	United States	Club Imperial	
November 23, 1963	Columbus, MO	United States	Paradise Club	
December 24, 1963	Klamath Falls, OR	United States	Klamath Falls Auditorium	Christmas Eve Dance
December 28, 1963	Vancouver, BC	Canada	Exhibition Gardens	
December 29, 1963	Olympia, WA	United States	Evergreen Ballroom	

==== 1964 ====
Date	City	Country	Venue	Notes
March 1964	Dallas, TX	United States	Lovall's Ballroom	Shows recorded for the albums Live! The Ike & Tina Turner Show (1965) and The Ike & Tina Turner Show – Vol. 2 (1967)
March 1964	Fort Worth, TX	United States	Skyliner Ballroom	Shows recorded for the albums Live! The Ike & Tina Turner Show (1965) and The Ike & Tina Turner Show – Vol. 2 (1967)
March 20, 1964	Oklahoma City, OK	United States	Bryant Center Auditorium	
March 22, 1964	Memphis, TN	United States	Club Handy	
March 28, 1964	Evansville, IL	United States	The Coliseum	
March 30, 1964	Indianapolis, IN	United States	Northside Armory (Tyndall Armory)	
April 1964	East St. Louis, IL	United States	Starlite Arena	
May 21, 1964	St. Louis, MO	United States	Imperial Club	
May 23, 1964	Columbus, MO	United States	Paradise Club	
June 8, 1964	El Monte, CA	United States	The 49er	
June 15, 1964	Long Beach, CA	United States	Rusty Rooster	They performed 2 shows in one night
June 25, 1964	Vancouver, BC	Canada	Exhibition Garden	
June 29, 1964	El Monte, CA	United States	The 49er	
July 1, 1964	Port Angeles, WA	United States	Masonic Temple	
July 9, 1964	Garden Grove, CA	United States	Gold Street	
July 23, 1964	Norwalk, CA	United States	The Flamingo	
July 27, 1964	El Monte, CA	United States	The 49er	
August 3, 1964	Pasadena, CA	United States	The Circle	
November 3, 1964	St. Louis, MO	United States	Club Imperial	
November 6, 1964	Dayton, OH	United States	Wampler's Ballroom	
November 16, 1964	El Monte, CA	United States	The 49er	
November 27, 1964	Olympia, WA	United States	Evergreen Ballroom	
December 7, 1964	El Monte, CA	United States	The 49er	
December 9, 1964	West Hollywood, CA	United States	Ciro's Le Disc	
December 10, 1964	Garden Grove, CA	United States	Gold Street	
December 13, 1964	Oakland, CA	United States	Continental Club	
December 14, 1964	Los Angeles, CA	United States	Lazy X	
December 30, 1964	West Hollywood, CA	United States	Ciro's Le Disc	

==== 1965 ====
Date	City	Country	Venue	Notes
January 14, 1965	West Hollywood, CA	United States	Ciro's Le Disc	
January 18, 1965	El Monte, CA	United States	The 49er	
January 21, 1965	West Hollywood, CA	United States	Ciro's Le Disc	
January 26, 1965	West Hollywood, CA	United States	Ciro's Le Disc	
February 2, 1965	West Hollywood, CA	United States	Ciro's Le Disc	
February 8, 1965	West Hollywood, CA	United States	Ciro's Le Disc	
February 15, 1965	El Monte, CA	United States	The 49er	
February 21, 1965	San Francisco, CA	United States	Fillmore Auditorium	Show with Little Richard. Jimi Hendrix performed with Ike & Tina and Little Richard
February 22, 1965	Tarzana, CA	United States	The Skol Room	Located inside Corbin Bowl
February 25, 1965	Los Angeles, CA	United States	Los Angeles Valley College	
February 25-March 13, 1965	West Hollywood, CA	United States	Ciro's Le Disc	
March 22, 1965	El Monte, CA	United States	The 49er	
March 26, 1965	Sacramento, CA	United States	Sacramento Memorial Auditorium	Supporting The Righteous Brothers
March 29, 1965	Tarzana, CA	United States	The Skol Room	
April 4, 1965	Olympia, WA	United States	Evergreen Ballroom	
April 12, 1965	Los Angeles, CA	United States	Top Hat Club	Located at 12220 Pico Blvd
April 22, 1965	Garden Grove, CA	United States	Gold Street	
April 23, 1965	Sacramento, CA	United States	Sacramento Memorial Auditorium	R&B Rock Show with the Olympics, Sonny & Cher, Dick & Dee Dee, Little Ray, and the Del Counts
May 9, 1965	Memphis, TN	United States	Club Paradise	
June 6, 1965	Annapolis, MD	United States	Carr's Beach	She with Major Lance
June 15, 1965	Latrobe, PA	United States	Danceland	
July 2, 1965	Danville, VA	United States	Danville Armory	
July 10–12, 1965	Atlanta, GA	United States	Royal Peacock Social Club	
July 28, 1965	Lafayette, LA	United States	Lafayette Municipal Auditorium	
August 1, 1965	Minneapolis, MN	United States	Minneapolis Auditorium	
August 2, 1965	Minneapolis, MN	United States	The Key Club	Show with Muddy Waters
August 18, 1965	Long Beach, CA	United States	Cinnamon Cinder	
August 21, 1965	Sacramento, CA	United States	Cocoanut Grove Ballroom	
September 24–30, 1965	Washington, D.C.	United States	Howard Theatre	Show with Dee Clark, Lee Dorsey, Eddie & Ernie, and the Mad Lads
October 2, 1965	Asbury Park, NJ	United States	Asbury Park Convention Hall	2 shows at 8:30 & 11:30pm with Martha & the Vandellas, the Jive Five, and Shep & the Limelights
October 4, 1965	Lexington, KY	United States	Paradise Inn	
October 9, 1965	St. Louis, MO	United States	St. Louis Armory	Show presented by The 2 Plus 2 Club
October 10, 1965	Molina, IL	United States	Danceland	
October 22, 1965	Indianapolis, IN	United States	North Side Armory	
October 23, 1965	Benld, IN	United States	Coliseum Ballroom	
October 29, 1965	Muncie, IN	United States	Muncie Armory	
November 29–30, 1965	Hollywood, CA	United States	Moulin Rouge	Filmed for The Big T.N.T. Show (1965) concert film
December 13, 1965	El Monte, CA	United States	The 49er	
December 14, 1965	Signal Hill, CA	United States	Gay 90's A-Go-Go	
December 19, 1965	Los Angeles, CA	United States	Lazy X	
December 20, 1965	West Hollywood, CA	United States	The Galaxy	
December 26, 1965	Hollywood, CA	United States	Hullabaloo	Formerly the Moulin Rouge nightclub
December 27, 1965	West Hollywood, CA	United States	The Galaxy	

==== 1966 ====
Date	City	Country	Venue	Notes
January 28, 1966	Vancouver, BC	Canada	P.N.E. Garden Auditorium	
January 30, 1966	Olympia, WA	United States	Evergreen Ballroom	
February 2, 1966	San Francisco, CA	United States	Fillmore Auditorium	
February 6–10, 1966	West Hollywood, CA	United States	Gazzarri's Hollywood a Go-Go	Supported by Pat & Lolly Vegas
February 13, 1966	Los Angeles, CA	United States	Lazy X	
February 14, 1966	El Monte, CA	United States	The 49er	
February 19, 1966	Los Angeles, CA	United States	Lazy X	
February 24, 1966	Garden Grove, CA	United States	Gold Street	2 shows
February 27, 1966	Los Angeles, CA	United States	Lazy X	
March 14, 1966	El Monte, CA	United States	The 49er	
March 18, 1966	Los Angeles, CA	United States	Pierce College	Mardi Gras
April 3, 1966	Los Angeles, CA	United States	Lazy X	
April 19, 1966	St. Louis, MO	United States	Club Imperial	
May 6, 1966	Fort-Worth, TX	United States	Casino Ballroom	
May 15, 1966	Memphis, TN	United States	Club Paradise	
June 10, 1966	St. Joseph, MO	United States	Eagle Hall	
June 12, 1966	Davenport, IA	United States	Davenport Masonic Temple	
June 25, 1966	Fort-Worth, TX	United States	Casino Ballroom	
July 2, 1966	El Paso, TX	United States	El Paso County Coliseum	
July 11, 1966	West Hollywood, CA	United States	The Galaxy	
July 13, 1966	West Hollywood, CA	United States	The Galaxy	
July 15, 1966	Oakland, CA	United States	Bandstand	
July 25, 1966	West Hollywood, CA	United States	The Galaxy	
July 28, 1966	Los Angeles, CA	United States	Nite Life	Located at 16683 Roscoe Boulevard in Van Nuys
July 28, 1966	Long Beach, CA	United States	The Limit	
August 8, 1966	West Hollywood, CA	United States	The Galaxy	
August 15, 1966	West Hollywood, CA	United States	The Galaxy	
August 22, 1966	West Hollywood, CA	United States	The Galaxy	
August 26–27, 1966	Los Angeles, CA	United States	Top Hat Club	
August 29, 1966	West Hollywood, CA	United States	The Galaxy	
August 31, 1966	Long Beach, CA	United States	The Limit	
September 5, 1966	West Hollywood, CA	United States	The Galaxy	
September 10, 1966	Fort Worth, TX	United States	North Side Coliseum	
September 12, 1966	West Hollywood, CA	United States	The Galaxy	
September 16, 1966	Oklahoma City, OK	United States	Zebra Room	
September 17, 1966	Columbia, MO	United States	Jesse Auditorium	University of Missouri
September 18, 1966	St. Louis, MO	United States	Club Imperial	
September 23, 1966	London	England	Royal Albert Hall	The Rolling Stones British Tour with The Yardbirds & Peter Jay and the New Jaywalkers.
September 24, 1966	Leeds	England	Odeon Theatre	The Rolling Stones British Tour with The Yardbirds & Peter Jay and the New Jaywalkers. 2 shows each night
September 25, 1966	Liverpool	England	Empire Theatre	The Rolling Stones British Tour with The Yardbirds & Peter Jay and the New Jaywalkers. 2 shows each night
September 28, 1966	Ardwick, Manchester	England	ABC Ardwick	The Rolling Stones British Tour with The Yardbirds & Peter Jay and the New Jaywalkers. 2 shows each night
September 29, 1966	Stockton-on-Tees	England	ABC Theatre	The Rolling Stones British Tour with The Yardbirds & Peter Jay and the New Jaywalkers. 2 shows each night
September 30, 1966	Glasgow	Scotland	Odeon Theatre	The Rolling Stones British Tour with The Yardbirds & Peter Jay and the New Jaywalkers. 2 shows each night
October 1, 1966	Newcastle upon Tyne	England	City Hall	The Rolling Stones British Tour with The Yardbirds & Peter Jay and the New Jaywalkers. 2 shows each night
October 2, 1966	Ipswich	England	Gaumont Theatre	The Rolling Stones British Tour with The Yardbirds & Peter Jay and the New Jaywalkers. 2 shows each night
October 6, 1966	Birmingham	England	Birmingham Odeon	The Rolling Stones British Tour with The Yardbirds & Peter Jay and the New Jaywalkers. 2 shows each night
October 7, 1966	Bristol	England	Colston Hall	The Rolling Stones British Tour with The Yardbirds & Peter Jay and the New Jaywalkers. 2 shows each night
October 8, 1966	Cardiff	Wales	Capitol Theatre	The Rolling Stones British Tour with The Yardbirds & Peter Jay and the New Jaywalkers. 2 shows each night
October 9, 1966	Southampton	England	Gaumont Theatre	The Rolling Stones British Tour with The Yardbirds & Peter Jay and the New Jaywalkers. 2 shows each night
October 11, 1966	Buckinghamshire	England	High Wycombe Town Hall	
October 12, 1966	London	England	Blaises	Located at 121 Queen's Gate
October 14, 1966	London	England	Tiles	Located at 79-89 Oxford Street
October 15, 1966	Manchester	England	Oasis	Located at 45-47 Lloyd Street
October 15, 1966	Sheffield	England	King Mojo Club	
October 17, 1966	Bath	England	Bath Pavilion	
October 17, 1966	Coventry	England	Locarno Ballroom	
October 21, 1966	Leicester	England	Granby Halls	Supported by Edwin Starr, Alvin Robinson, and the Family
October 22, 1966	Nottingham	England	Beachcomber Club	Located at 47 St. Mary's-Gate.
October 22, 1966	Birmingham	England	Marqee Club	Located at 90 Navigation St., City Centre, Birmingham
October 29, 1966	Hickory, NC	United States	Ridgeview Recreation Center	
November 11–14, 1966	Detroit, MI	United States	Phelps Lounge	
November 23, 1966	Toronto, ON	Canada	Club 888	
December 8, 1966	Wichita, KS	United States	Civic Playhouse	
December 23, 1966	Los Angeles, CA	United States	Lazy X	
December 28, 1966	San Diego, CA	United States	Century Room	El Cortez Hotel
December 31, 1966	Fort Worth, TX	United States	Commercial Exhibits Building	

==== 1967 ====
Date	City	Country	Venue	Notes
January 1, 1967	Fort Worth, TX	United States	Commercial Exhibits Building	
January 8, 1967	Long Beach, CA	United States	Blue Bunny	
January 13, 1967	Oakland, CA	United States	Oakland Auditorium	
January 14, 1967	San Francisco, CA	United States	California Hall	
January 18, 1967	Long Beach, CA	United States	The Limit	
January 1967	West Hollywood, CA	United States	The Galaxy	Every Thursday
February 3, 1967	Los Angeles, CA	United States	Lazy X	
February 19, 1967	Los Angeles, CA	United States	The Summit	
February 24, 1967	Los Angeles, CA	United States	Northridge Valley Skateland	
February 24, 1967	Los Angeles, CA	United States	The Soul Spot	Formerly Cinnamon Cinder at 11345 Ventura Blvd March 4, 1967 Played Iron Bridge in Eugene OR based on executed contract and photos at event
March 5, 1967	Portland, OR	United States	Wooden Shoe Ballroom	
July 16, 1967	Memphis, TN	United States	Club Paradise	
August 29, 1967	Louisville, KY	United States	Golden Barrell Lounge	

==== 1968 ====
Date	City	Country	Venue	Notes
~~April 22, 1968~~	Birmingham	England	Birmingham Town Hall	Concert cancelled
June 24, 1968	Fort Worth, TX	United States	Will Rogers Auditorium	Supported by the Al T-N-T Braggs Revue

==== 1969 ====
Date	City	Country	Venue	Notes
June 5, 1969	Indianapolis, IN	United States	Walker Theater	
September 1969	Los Angeles, CA	United States	Baby Grand West	Located at 2825 Crenshaw Boulevard
October 19, 1969	Spokane, WA	United States	Spokane Coliseum	Supporting Three Dog Night
~~October 26, 1969~~	San Diego, CA	United States	Balboa Stadium	Supporting The Doors; Cancelled show
November 20, 1969	Berkeley, CA	United States	Zellerbach Hall	University of California, Berkeley
November 21–22, 1969	New York, NY	United States	Felt Forum	Show with Sam & Dave
November 23, 1969	Buffalo, NY	United States	Kleinhans Music Hall	Supported by the Chi-Lites
November 26 & 28-29, 1969	New York, NY	United States	Electric Circus	Each show at midnight
November 27–28, 1969	New York, NY	United States	Madison Square Garden	The Rolling Stones American Tour 1969

=== 1970s ===
==== 1970 ====
Date	City	Country	Venue	Notes
May 30, 1970	St. Paul, MN	United States	Minnesota State Fair Hippodrome	Bacchanalia Revival Festival
July 8, 1970	New York, NY	United States	Honka Monka	
July 11, 1970	Newport, RI	United States	Festival Field	Newport Jazz Festival. Performers included Nina Simone, Kenny Burrell, Dizzy Gillespie, Don Byas, Dexter Gordon, Ray Nance, Herbie Hancock
July 13, 1970	New York, NY	United States	Wollman Memorial Rink	Schaefer Music Festival. Supported by the Voices of East Harlem
July 15, 1970	Cambridge, MA	United States	Harvard Stadium	Schaefer Music Festival. Supported by Vivian Reed

==== 1971 ====
Date	City	Country	Venue	Notes
April 24, 1971	Memphis, TN	United States	Mid-South Coliseum	
April 27, 1971	Hattiesburg, MS	United States	Reed Green Coliseum	University of Southern Mississippi
April 30, 1971	Salem, VA	United States	Salem-Roanoke Valley Civic Center	
June 5, 1971	Boston, MA	United States	Boston Arena	
June 11, 1971	Philadelphia, PA	United States	Spectrum	Supported by Mandrill
June 17–18, 1971	Columbia, MD	United States	Merriweather Post Pavilion	Supported by NRBQ on 6/17 and Mandrill on 6/18
June 24, 1971	Minneapolis, MN	United States	Minneapolis Auditorium	Supported by the Grease Band
July 8, 1971	Monroe, LA	United States	Monroe Civic Center	Supported by B.B. King
August 26–27, 1971	San Carlos, CA	United States	Circle Star Theater	Supported by Willis, Don & Tracy and Extension 5
September 19, 1971	Fresno, CA	United States	Selland Arena	Supported by Ballin' Jack

==== 1972 ====
Date	City	Country	Venue	Notes
March 11, 1972	Fort Worth, TX	United States	Tarrant County Convention Center	
March 19, 1972	College Park, MD	United States	Cole Field House	University of Maryland
April 8, 1972	Cleveland, MS	United States	Walter Sillers Coliseum	Delta State College
April 21, 1972	Fresno, CA	United States	Selland Arena	Supported by the Chambers Brothers
April 30, 1972	Richmond, VA	United States	Richmond Coliseum	Supported by Curtis Mayfield
May 6, 1972	Québec City	Canada	Québec City Coliseum	
May 7, 1972	Montréal	Canada	Montreal Forum	
May 14, 1972	Stockton, CA	United States	Stockton Civic Auditorium	Supported by Shanti
May 21, 1972	Salinas, CA	United States	California Rodeo Arena	Supported by 87th Off Broadway and Billy Preston
May 25, 1972	San Diego, CA	United States	San Diego Sports Arena	Supported by Spirit
August 13, 1972	Westbury, NY	United States	Roosevelt Raceway	Festival of Hope to benefit the Nassau Society for Crippled Children and Adults
September 2, 1972	Saratoga Springs, NY	United States	Saratoga Performing Arts Center	
~~September 9, 1972~~	Cherry Hill, NJ	United States	Cherry Hill Arena	Cancelled appearance
September 29-October 1, 1972	Woodland Hills, CA	United States	Valley Music Theater	2 shows on Sept. 29 & 30, 1 show on Oct. 1
November 5, 1972	Birmingham	England	Barbarella's	
November 6, 1972	Manchester	England	Hardrock Concert Theatre	
November 17, 1972	Berlin	Germany	Deutschlandhalle	
November 18, 1972	Munich	Germany	Circus Krone-Bau	
November 24, 1972	Copenhagen	Denmark	Falkoner Teatret	
December 27, 1972	Allentown, PA	United States	Rockne Hall	

==== 1973 ====
Date	City	Country	Venue	Notes
July 11, 1973	Birmingham, AL	United States	Alabama State Fairgrounds	
September 16, 1973	San Francisco, CA	United States	Candlestick Park	"Extravaganza '73" rock and gospel benefit for the Southeast Community Cultural Center
September 27, 1973	Portland, OR	United States	Portland Memorial Coliseum	Supported by the Buddy Miles Express
November 13, 1973	Berlin	Germany	Deutschlandhalle	

==== 1974 ====
Date April 21, 1974	City Detroit	Country USA	Venue. Michigan Palace	Notes
August 31, 1974	Kamloops, BC	Canada	Rose Hill Harvest Fair	Replace Redbone on this date
September 2, 1974	Kamloops, BC	Canada	Rose Hill Harvest Fair	
November 2, 1974	Belgrade	Yugoslavia	Hala Pionir	
November 7, 1974	Stuttgart	Germany	Beethoven-Saal Liederhalle	
November 16, 1974	Copenhagen	Denmark	Tivolis Koncertsal	
November 17, 1974	Hamburg	Germany	Congress-Centrum Hamburg	

==== 1975 ====
Date	City	Country	Venue	Notes
~~February 6, 1975~~	Toronto, ON	Canada	Maple Leaf Gardens	Show with Marvin Gaye; Cancelled appearance
February 7, 1975	Burnaby, BC	Canada	BCIT SAC Gym	British Columbia Institute of Technology
February 14, 1975	Edmonton, AB	Canada	Edmonton Gardens	Supported by Jayson Hoover
February 27, 1975	Melbourne	Australia	Festival Hall	
March 2, 1975	Adelaide	Australia	Apollo Stadium	
April 20, 1975	Merced, CA	United States	Merced County Fairgrounds	Supported by Journey and Fielding Mellis.Concert sponsored by Phi Beta Lambda
April 26, 1975	Raleigh, NC	United States	Dorton Arena	
August 15, 1975	Bilzen	Belgium	The Dell	Replaced Lou Reed at Jazz Bilzen Festival
October 20, 1975	Denton, TX	United States	Main Auditorium	Texas Woman's University
October 27, 1975	Düsseldorf	Germany	Philipshalle	
October 28, 1975	Berlin	Germany	Deutschlandhalle	
November 5, 1975	Bremen	Germany	Stadthalle	
November 8, 1975	Ludwigshafen	Germany	Eberthalle	

==== 1976 ====
Date	City	Country	Venue	Notes
May 16, 1976	Berkeley, CA	United States	Berkeley Community Theater	
May 21, 1976	Albuquerque, NM	United States	Tingley Coliseum	Supporting Journey
May 23, 1976	Cedar Rapids, IA	United States	Hawkeye Downs	Supported by Rare Earth
May 27, 1976	Calgary, AB	Canada	Southern Alberta Jubilee Auditorium	
June 4–13, 1976	Fort Lauderdale, FL	United States	Bachelors III	2 shows a night at 9.30 & 12am with Monday and Tuesday off. Shows on June 9 & June 10 were cancelled
June 24–27, 1976	Memphis, TN	United States	Hilton Inn Rainbow Room	Supported by Pat Paulsen. 2 shows a night at 7:30 & 10:30pm
