= Sunbeam Mitchell =

American businessman

Andrew "Sunbeam" Mitchell (November 6, 1906 – August 22, 1989) was an American Memphis-based businessman. He operated the Mitchell Hotel which lodged well-known musicians, and soon he began operating nightclubs on the Chitlin' Circuit such as the Club Handy, Club Ebony, and the Club Paradise. Mitchell ran nightclubs for 40 years until selling off his holdings in the 1980s.

In the book The Chitlin' Circuit, author Preston Lauterbach wrote, "Sunbeam laid the cornerstone of what came to be known as the Memphis sound."

== Life and career ==
Born in Memphis, Tennessee on November 6, 1906, Mitchell grew up on Beale Street. His father was a drayman for W. B. Mallory and Sons on Front Street. His mother took care of Mitchell's brother and two sisters at home. As the oldest, Mitchell had to drop out of the first grade and help his father work.

Mitchell returned to Memphis after working at a Chrysler factory in Detroit, Michigan during World War II. In the 1940s, post-war Memphis became a hot spot for blues music. African American musicians began moving to Memphis, and established entertainers would perform and record here. During segregation, there were few venues where African Americans could perform, and fewer hotels where they could stay.

In 1946, Mitchell and his wife Ernestine Mitchell (née McKinney) leased two floors above Abe Plough's Pantaze Drug Store on Beale Street at Hernando. The opened the Domino Lounge on the second floor above the Pantaze Drug Store and the Mitchell Hotel on the third floor where the Mitchell's also lived.

The Mitchell Hotel was billed as "Memphis' Leading Color Hotel." His wife Ernestine managed the hotel which had thirty rooms, "gas head and modern baths." Mitchell and his wife earned a reputation among traveling musicians for their generosity. They often provided struggling musicians with food and shelter. The hotel attracted musicians such as B. B. King, Ike Turner, Bobby "Blue" Bland, and Little Junior Parker, "all of whom were living in Memphis at the time looking for a break. Little Richard stayed at the Mitchell Hotel for weeks when he did not have any money. R&B Singer Johnny Ace was a frequent resident. When he died in 1954, the Mitchells were left with his clothes and belongings.

In a 1981 interview with the Memphis Press-Scimitar, Mitchell stated, "All of them knew they could come to Memphis and be taken care of in those days." B.B. King said, "Anytime you didn't have any money, or anything, you could always go get a room and a bowl of chili."

In October 1957, the Mitchell Hotel was damaged in a fire. Water poured into the burning building caused damage to Gottman's Department Store below the hotel at 205 Beale Street. It also caused minimal damage to the storage room of the Pantaze Drug Store No. 2.

Mitchell continued operating nightclubs in downtown Memphis. In 1954, the Hippodrome nightclub at 500 Beale Street was listed for sale. Mitchell purchased the venue and reopened it as the Club Ebony in 1955. Mitchell often allowed organizations to host benefit events at the club. The Club Ebony remained open until 1960, and then it reopened as the Hippodrome under new ownership in 1961.

In 1958, Mitchell re-opened the Domino Lounge as the Club Handy. The club was named in honor of W.C. Handy. He also owned Mitchell's Girl and Earnest's Grill. In 1962, Mitchell's wife and her sister Hazel Jones opened Earnestine & Hazel's on Beale Street.

In addition to his nightclubs, hotel, and grills, Mitchell operated Mitchell Amusement Enterprises in the 1950s, booking dates for musicians Little Milton and Lowell Fulson. Mitchell also sponsored local concerts at venues such as the Ellis Auditorium, where Ray Charles performed in 1961 and 1966. He also sponsored an Ike & Tina Turner concert at the New Daisy Theatre in 1963.

In 1965, Mitchell opened the Club Paradise, which he operated until he sold it in 1985.

Mitchell died at the age of 83 after an apparent heart attack on August 22, 1989. His widow, Ernestine Mitchell, died from heart failure at age 80 on March 30, 1999.
