= Hippodrome (Memphis) =

Coordinates: 35.1392°N 90.0447°W

The Hippodrome was a music venue at 500 Beale Street in Memphis. The venue was opened in 1950 as a skating rink for African-Americans and later became a nightclub. In 1955, the Hippodrome was reopened as the Club Ebony. In 1961, under new owners, it went back to being called the Hippodrome until its closure in 1968.

The venue was a stop on the "Chitlin' Circuit," a selection of venues considered safe and acceptable for African-American entertainers in the era of racial segregation in the United States.

== History ==
The Hippodrome was opened by businessman Emmett Werne on December 16, 1950. The building, which cost $100,000 to construct, was located at 500 Beale Street in Memphis, Tennessee. The Hippodrome was operated by John T. Miles, a Black college graduate, and he had a staff that included two skating instructors.

By 1952, the venue had become a hotspot to showcase local and national blues and R&B musical acts. In 1954, DJ Dewey Phillips, host of the WHBQ radio show "Red, Hot, and Blue," held a dance at the Hippodrome.

In 1954, the Hippodrome was listed for sale for $8,000. In 1955, the Hippodrome was purchased by businessman Andrew "Sunbeam" Mitchell and he changed the name to the Club Ebony. Mitchell often allowed organizations to host benefit events at the club. In 1961, the Club Ebony was renamed back to the Hippodrome under new ownership.

The venue was often rented out to various organizations for private parties and charity events. Fraternities such as Alpha Kappa Alpha and Kappa Alpha Psi hosted events at the club.

Ownership changed a few times during the 1960s. In April 1966, the owner Albert J. Jackson received a beer permit for The Hippodrome Lounge. In January 1967, John Currie and Susie Currie received permits for The Currie's Hippodrome. John Currie operated the nightclub until his death in August 1968. By November 1968, the club had closed and the building was torn down to make way for a motel.

== Notable performers ==
Notable singers and musicians who performed at the venue include:

- Lowell Fulson
- Ray Charles
- Johnny Ace
- Ruth Brown
- Willis Jackson
- Ike Turner
- Lloyd Price
- Little Walter
- Muddy Waters
- Howlin' Wolf
- B.B. King
- Louis Jordan
- Smiley Lewis
- The 5 Satins
- Bo Diddley
- The Coasters
- The Drifters
- Paul "Hucklebuck" Williams
