= Club Paradise (nightclub) =

Nightclub in Memphis, Tennessee, US

Coordinates: 35.1284°N 90.0402°W

The Club Paradise was a nightclub at 645 E. Georgia Avenue in Memphis, Tennessee. It was a stop on the "Chitlin' Circuit," a selection of venues considered safe and acceptable for African-American entertainers in the era of racial segregation in the United States.

The Club Paradise was owned by Abe Plough and operated by Sunbeam Mitchell from 1965 until 1985. In 1985, Mitchell retired and the nightclub opened under new ownership as the New Club Paradise. The New Club Paradise closed in 1999.

== History ==
In 1965, Sunbeam Mitchell took out a six-year lease for a 42,000-square-foot building at 645 E. Georgia Avenue in Memphis. The 2,500-seat capacity venue had originally been built as a bowling alley but it was never used. Mitchell said he "just felt Memphis had grown so much it was time for 'a fabulous club with big seating.'" At the time, Mitchell was already operating the Club Handy and had previously owned the Mitchell Hotel in Memphis.

The Club Paradise was one of the few establishments in the city for which the authorities approved a public dance hall license. The nightclub had valet parking, a private room for special parties, a dining room that could be rented, and a club room with oak paneling and wall-to-wall carpeting. The dance floor could fit approximately 250 people. Mitchell's wife Ernestine Mitchell worked as a hostess, and Bryant T. Williams Sr. of the Tri-State Defender handled the public relations.

Bobby "Blue" Bland's revue with Joe Scott's orchestra performed at the opening of the Club Paradise on March 21, 1965.

The Intercollegiate Chapter of NAACP—with members from MSU, CBC, LeMoyne, Owens, Southwestern, Henderson and Griggs Business—sponsored a benefit at the Club Paradise on April 15, 1965. The performers included Rufus Thomas, David Porter, Wendy Rene, Charles James, Sam & Dave and the Club Handy Band.

In 1966, the Memphis City Commission attempted to purchase the club with federal funds and convert it into a recreation center. Mitchell entered a lease-to-own agreement and eventually purchased the venue.

From its heyday until its closure, soul, blues, and funk musicians performed at the Club Paradise. Singer Merk Harris was a regular headliner along with R&B singer Big Ella and Irvin Reason's Big Band in the 1960s.

Mitchell also rented the club out to fraternities such as Kingsmen, Social Gents, Gay Cavaliers, and Ebonett Social club.

The Club Paradise sponsored a Ray Charles concert at Ellis Auditorium on June 5, 1966. Although the show was highly anticipated, Mitchell took a loss. "It cost me $8,000 to bring him in, and I only took in $6,000, so I lose $2,000. I should have had him at the paradise instead of the Auditorium, and I'd have made money," he said.

In 1985, Mitchell sold the nightclub to Willie Moore and Paul Jordan. They renamed the club the New Club Paradise, which remained in operation until 1999.

In 2016, the New Club Paradise reopened as a community center, the Paradise Entertainment Center.

== Notable performers ==
Notable performers who performed at Club Paradise include:

- Bobby "Blue Bland
- Bill Doggett
- Rufus Thomas
- B.B. King
- Howlin' Wolf
- Arthur Prysock
- Jimmy Dorsey
- Lloyd Price
- Red Prysock
- Big Ella
- Count Basie
- Ike & Tina Turner
- Cannonball Adderley
- Ray Charles
- Lou Rawls
- Aretha Franklin
- Sam & Dave
- O.V. Wright
- The Delfonics
- Funkadelics
- Phineas Newborn.
