= Sax Kari =

American multi-instrumentalist, bandleader and songwriter (1920–2009)

Background information
- Birth name: Isaac Columbus Toombs Jr.
- Also known as: Saxton Kari; Candy Yams; Ira Green; Texas Red; Dirty Red Morgan
- Born: February 6, 1920; Chicago, Illinois, U.S.
- Died: October 1, 2009 (aged 89); Tampa, Florida, U.S.
- Genres: R&B, disco, funk
- Occupation(s): Musician, bandleader, songwriter, record producer
- Instrument(s): Vocals, guitar, piano, organ, saxophone
- Years active: 1930s–1990s

Sax Kari (February 6, 1920 – October 1, 2009), born Isaac Columbus Toombs Jr., sometimes known as Isaac Saxton Kari Toombs or simply Saxton Kari, was an American multi-instrumentalist, bandleader, songwriter, record producer, A&R man and promoter, who had a wide variety of roles during a career in African American entertainment and R&B music lasting from the 1920s to the 1990s. He also used pseudonyms, including Ira Green, Texas Red, Dirty Red Morgan, and Candy Yams.

== Life and career ==
He was born in Chicago, the son of Tennessee-born Isaac Columbus Toombs and his wife Irene. As a child, he ran away from home and from the age of nine performed in vaudeville as a comic entertainer with Butterbeans and Susie, who gave him the nickname "Candy Yams" for his relatively light freckled complexion. He learned to play piano, guitar, and reed instruments, and by 1940 was living in Gary, Indiana, with his mother. He worked in bands as a guitarist, and in 1942 took Charlie Christian's place in the orchestra at the Lyon's Den club in Oklahoma City. He began working with and for club owner and entrepreneur Denver D. Ferguson in Indianapolis in the early 1940s, promoting concerts and helping Ferguson set up the network later known as the "Chitlin' Circuit".

He formed his own eighteen-piece touring band, and settled in Detroit around 1945. He made his first recordings with his orchestra for Imperial Records in 1947, followed by recordings with vocalist Roosevelt "Whiskey" Sheffield for Apollo in 1949. In 1953, he released his most successful record, "Daughter (That's Your Red Wagon)", an answer song to Ruth Brown's "(Mama) He Treats Your Daughter Mean", which reached No. 8 on the Billboard R&B chart. The record was credited to "Swinging Sax Kari" and featured singer Gloria Irving.

During the 1950s he worked with Houston promoter Don Robey. In the mid-1950s in Detroit, he produced early recording sessions with Della Reese, as well as recording novelty records such as "Chocolate Fizz" and "Goldie the Green-Eyed Octopus" under his own name, on a variety of mostly small independent labels. He wrote and produced for other musicians on labels including Checker and Vee Jay. In 1959, he produced the single "You're So Fine" by The Falcons, a group that included Mack Rice, Eddie Floyd and Robert Ward. The song reached No. 2 on the R&B chart and No. 17 on the pop chart.

In the early 1960s, he moved to New Orleans, where he set up a recording studio and worked with Allen Toussaint as an A&R man and producer for his Sansu record label. He managed R&B shouter Esquerita, and produced records by Chris Kenner, Polka Dot Slim, and others. By the late 1960s he had moved to Mobile, Alabama, where he set up a record store and his own label, Channel 1. He worked as a songwriter for Henry Stone's TK label in Miami, Florida, writing for George McCrae, Wilson Pickett and others. He composed the soundtrack for the 1978 blaxploitation movie The Six Thousand Dollar Nigger, also known as Super Soul Brother, starring Wildman Steve.

He wrote for Rock Candy Records, a hip-hop label in New York, in the early 1980s, and also toured with a band, Four Sticks of Dynamite and a Fuse – the fuse being a female dancer. The band won a residency at a club in Seffner, Florida, and Kari settled there. He also started performing as a solo act in resorts in the Tampa area, often billed under his old nickname as "Candy Yams". In 1997, he released a CD, Love Juice, credited to Candy Yams and the Bluesville Express.

He retired to Brandon, Florida, where he was interviewed by Preston Lauterbach and provided much of the background information for Lauterbach's book, The Chitlin' Circuit and the Road to Rock 'n' Roll. Sax Kari died in Florida in 2009, aged 89.

A compilation of his New Orleans recordings, Fumigate Funky Broadway, was issued on CD in 2002.
