= Don Albert =

American jazz trumpeter and bandleader

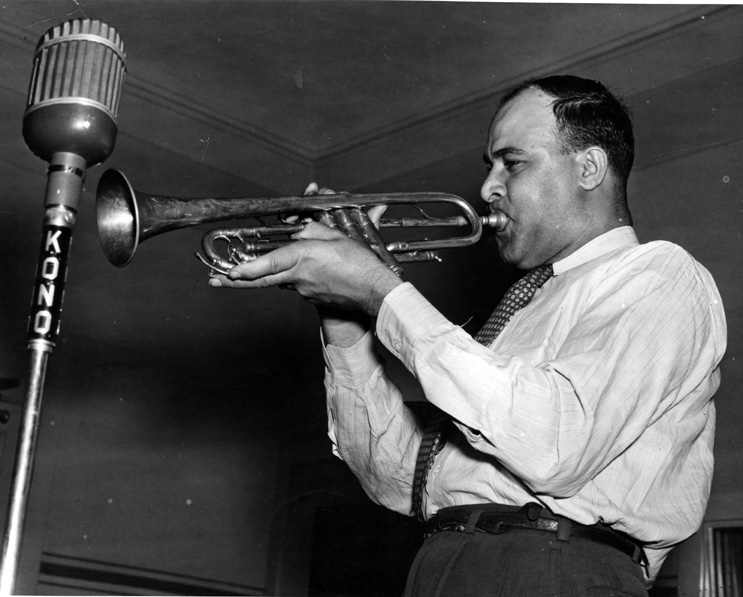

Background information
- Born: Albert Dominique; August 5, 1908; New Orleans, Louisiana, US
- Died: January 1980 San Antonio, Texas
- Genres: Jazz
- Occupations: Musician, bandleader
- Instrument: Trumpet

Albert Dominique, better known as Don Albert (August 5, 1908, New Orleans – January 1980, San Antonio, Texas) was an American jazz trumpeter and bandleader.

Albert's uncle was Natty Dominique. He got his start playing in parade brass bands in New Orleans at the beginning of the 1920s. He toured with the territory band of Alphonse Trent in 1925, then played with Troy Floyd at the Shadowland Ballroom in San Antonio from 1926 to 1929.

Albert led his own territory bands out of Texas in the 1930s and 1940s, with sidemen that included Alvin Alcorn, Louis Cottrell, Jr., and Herb Hall. After 1932 he acted more in a manager's capacity than as a performer. His bands played in Mexico and Canada, and won positive reviews from newspapers, but recorded only eight sides. He disbanded this group around 1937 due to economic conditions, and found work in civil service and managing a nightclub called the Keyhole Club in San Antonio in the early and mid-1940s; his club was shut down in 1948 by local authorities. In 1950, he opened a second location at 1619 West Poplar. He led a group at the Palace Theater in New York in 1949.

In the 1950s he continued performing part-time, playing in small groups into the 1970s. He recorded again in the 1960s and appeared at the New Orleans Jazz Festival in 1969.
