= 1619 West Poplar =

Historic performance venue in San Antonio, Texas

1619 West Poplar is a historic performance venue in San Antonio, Texas. From 1950 to 1964 it was Don Albert and Willie "Red" Winner's Keyhole Club. Albert helped manage and hosted musical acts. It was adorned with neon lights and signage. The building now hosts the Sociedad Fraternal Cruz Blanca and is used for weddings and wrestling events.

Albert opened the Keyhole Club at 628 Iowa Street in 1944. It was moved to Poplar in 1950.

As the Keyhole Club, it was integrated despite operating during the era of segregation. It drew police raids. It was part of the so-called Chitlin Circuit. Nat King Cole and Duke Ellington were photographed among an entourage at the club.

Albert hosted, managed, and co-owned the venue. He was photographed performing at it. Hort Hudge and his orchestra also performed at the venue. Clifford Scott refined his skills on the tenor saxophone at the club.

After closing, the Keyhole Club briefly re-opened around January 1965 for the holidays, with a "last show until further notice" being hosted on January 2.
