= Taborian Hall =

- U.S. National Register of Historic Places
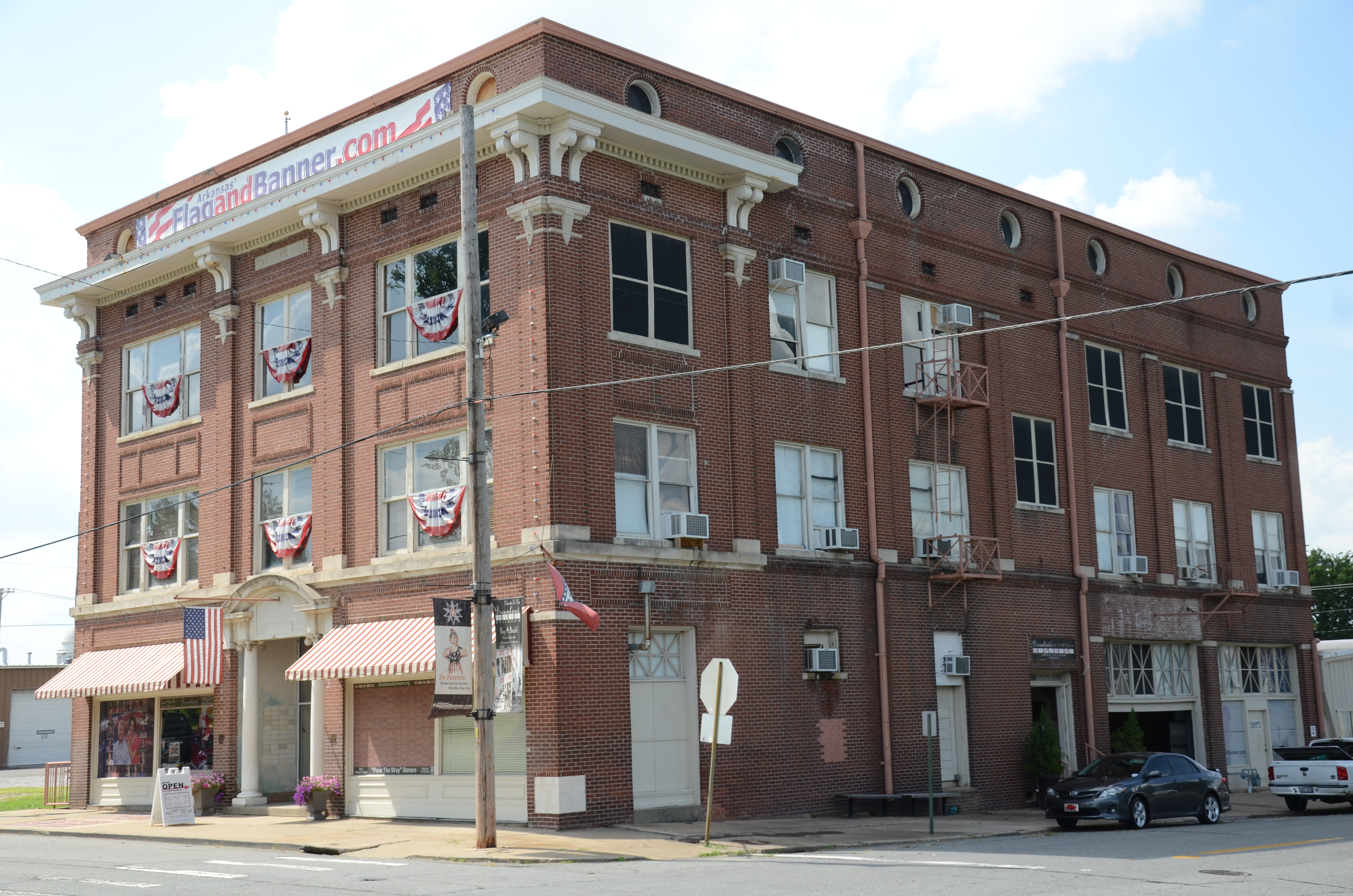

- Location within Arkansas Location within the United States
- Location: 9th and State Sts., Little Rock, Arkansas
- Coordinates: 34°44′30″N 92°16′48″W
- Area: less than one acre
- Built: 1916
- Architect: Simeon Johnson
- Architectural style: Classical Revival
- NRHP reference No.: 82002130
- Added to NRHP: April 29, 1982

Originally known as Taborian Temple, the building was constructed in 1916 by the Arkansas chapter of the Knights and Daughters of Tabor when the 9th street area of Little Rock, Arkansas was a major hub of African-American commerce.

During the 1920s and 1930s the building was the home to many black-owned businesses, community center, officers and veterans club, and Arkansas' major stop on the famous Chitlin Circuit. In the 1930s, the Tabors, like many fraternal organizations at the time, lost their assets in the Great Depression. The building changed ownership, segmented, sold, and segmented over and over again through those years. Its 3rd floor opened under the name Dreamland Ballroom during this time. The United States' Officer's Club (USO) purchased the building during the early years of World War II and Taborian Temple became a regular stopping point for black soldiers and war workers being trained across the Arkansas River (North Little Rock) at Camp Robinson. The Temple served as the only service club for African Americans in Little Rock during both World Wars.

By the mid 1950s, the building became known as Taborian Hall and was the home for three nightclubs: the Twin City Club in the basement, the Waiters Club on the building's second floor, and Dreamland, which then became known as Club Morocco, on the top floor. These establishments and Taborian Hall were considered central to a vibrant and active community on the 9th Street “Line,” which was the center for black businesses and culture in Little Rock. The Line was also a boundary that separated Little Rock's black and white communities.

Throughout the buildings history a succession of famous performers brought notoriety and fame to Taborian Hall and Dreamland Ballroom. As the city slowly began to integrate in the 1970s and 1980s, the "Line" neighborhood lost its luster and Taborian Hall eventually fell into disrepair.

== Dreamland Ballroom ==
The performance space on the 3rd floor of Taborian Hall became a regular touring stop on the Chitlin' Circuit, a group of venues across the southern and eastern U.S. that were known to be safe and accepting of African American performers, musicians, and comedians. Some of the era's greatest musical stars performed at Dreamland, including notable performers such as Louis Armstrong, Cab Calloway, Count Basie, Duke Ellington, Ella Fitzgerald, B. B. King, Ray Charles, and Sammy Davis Jr. During the Great Depression, Dreamland became known throughout the South, as well as in cities like Chicago and New York, as a magnet for Cotton Club artists. Entertainers such as these found welcoming audiences at Dreamland, which were often composed of whites and blacks.

Dreamland Ballroom, 1991

Dreamland Ballroom, during renovation

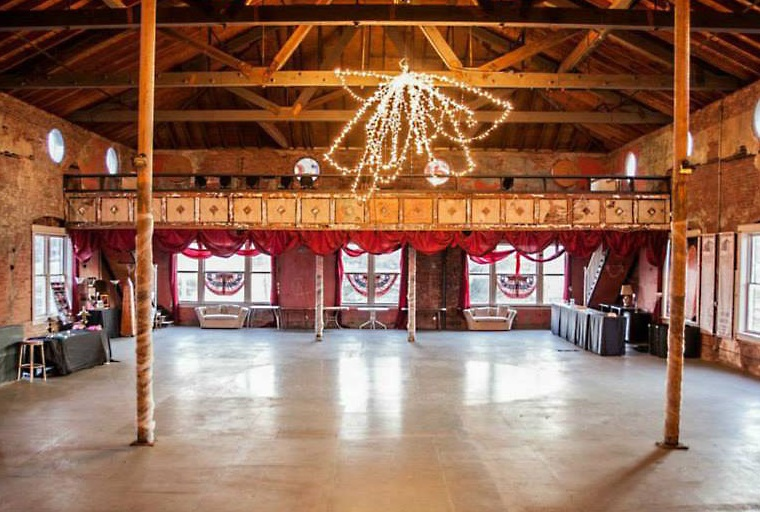
Dreamland Ballroom, 2017

Dreamland Ballroom, music performance

Dreamland Ballroom, wedding venue

== Architecture ==
The Taborian Hall is a Classical three-story masonry structure with stone trim accents and a main entrance that is recessed and framed by Ionic columns supporting a segmented-arch pediment. The upper floor bays are articulated by brick pilasters, which rise to a projecting cornice and parapet above.

The building was listed on the National Register of Historic Places in 1982.

Restoration

Taborian Hall circa 1990, in disrepair

By 1972, the Line neighborhood in Little Rock began to experience the same urban decay affecting many other downtown areas around the country. Much of Taborian Hall was vacant and black owned businesses in general were bracing for the planned construction of a new interstate through the heart of the Line neighborhood. By 1988, Taborian Hall was on the brink of being razed when Mark Abernathy, a concerned neighborhood conservationist bought the building at auction and "mothballed" it until it could be rehabbed. In 1991, Kerry McCoy and Arkansas Flag and Banner purchased the building with plans to use it as their headquarters as well as renovating Dreamland Ballroom to make it a viable performance space again.

In 2009, McCoy and a group of devoted friends and citizens formed a fundraising, education, and preservation board called Friends of Dreamland. The incorporated non-profit's mission is to build community through the music, history, and culture of the Dreamland Ballroom. Plans include constructing an addition on the west side of Taborian Hall that will house a separate entrance and elevator for better accessibility. In March, 2018 the U.S. Department of the Interior and National Park Service awarded a $499,668 African American Civil Rights Grant to the Friends of Dreamland in order to make the historic building more accessible to the public.

== See also ==
- National Register of Historic Places listings in Little Rock, Arkansas
