= Denver D. Ferguson =

American businessman and nightclub owner (1895–1957)

- Born: Denver Darious Ferguson; February 19, 1895; Brownsville, Kentucky, U.S.
- Died: May 11, 1957 (aged 62); Indianapolis, Indiana, U.S.
- Resting place: Page-Ferguson Cemetery, Brownsville, Kentucky, U.S.
- Occupations: Journalist; businessman; nightclub owner
- Spouses: Ruth Harrison; Naomi Harrison; Lilo Rantlach
- Children: Three

Denver Darious Ferguson Sr. (February 19, 1895 – May 11, 1957) was an American businessman and nightclub owner in Indianapolis, who had a leading role in establishing the "Chitlin' Circuit" of United States entertainment venues for black entertainers and audiences in the 1930s and 1940s. Earlier in his career he established a newspaper, The Edmonson County Star, in his home town of Brownsville, Kentucky, before moving to Indianapolis, where he established a printing company. His younger brother, Sea Ferguson, helped in the print shop and with Denver's other business ventures.

After leaving the publishing business, Ferguson became successful in illegal gambling and invested in real estate, as well as launching a talent management and promotion business. Musician and record producer Sax Kari described Ferguson as "the man who invented the chitlin’ circuit".

== Early life and family ==
Denver Ferguson was born in Brownsville, Kentucky, in 1895, the eldest son of Mattie (née Whitney) and Samuel Henry Ferguson. His younger brother Sea Harious Ferguson (December 22, 1899 – March 10, 1974), who became a property developer and working partner of his elder brother, was also born in Brownsville.

== Career ==
In his teens, Ferguson acquired a printing press, and around 1914 founded the Edmonson County Star newspaper in Brownsville. In 1917, during World War I, he was drafted. After his discharge in 1919, he moved to Indianapolis. The following year he established the Ferguson Printing Company, located on Indiana Avenue. Many of his clients ran street lotteries, the "numbers game" or "policy games"; for these small-time hustles, Ferguson designed and printed tickets resembling baseball scorecards. When his success in these illegal rackets drew the attention of public authorities, he recruited his brother Sea to serve as the public face of the operation. Sea opened a real estate brokerage in the city, and the brothers became renowned for their generosity in extending loans and donating to charitable causes in the black community.

In 1931, Sea Ferguson opened the Cotton Club nightclub in Indianapolis, and the following year Denver Ferguson opened the Trianon Ballroom, featuring Walter Barnes as his first star attraction. Barnes was experienced in touring with his band around the South, and wrote a regular column in The Chicago Defender until his death in the Rhythm Club fire in Natchez, Mississippi in 1940. The Theatre Owners Booking Association (TOBA) had collapsed in late 1930, and the Ferguson brothers drew on Barnes and his contacts to bring top black entertainers to Indianapolis. In 1938, Denver Ferguson opened the Sunset Terrace ballroom in Indianapolis, featuring Tiny Bradshaw, Earl Hines, Duke Ellington and Ella Fitzgerald in its early months. Largely as a result of the Ferguson brothers' initiatives, commercial activity thrived on Indiana Avenue in the late 1930s. In 1939 a full page announcement in the Indianapolis Recorder with well wishes from businesses announced his opening of the New Sunset Terrace venue in Indianapolis. However, in 1940 a clampdown by the authorities under Mayor Reginald H. Sullivan led to their businesses' licenses being revoked.

By the late 1930s, both Denver and Sea Ferguson were seen as among the wealthiest residents of Indianapolis. In 1941, they opened Ferguson Brothers, a booking agency, which grew rapidly and became the most powerful black-owned talent agency in the country. They helped various orchestras, bands, and vaudeville shows book gigs, including Jay McShann, King Kolax, Tiny Bradshaw, Roosevelt Sykes, Claude Trenier, the Bama State Collegians, Carolina Cotton Pickers, Snookum Russell, Milton Larkin, Clarence Love, Gene Pope, and the International Sweethearts of Rhythm, and organised tours around the South playing to black audiences.

In 1944, Denver Ferguson reopened Le Jazz Hott Spot in Chicago as part of his syndicate. He was a mentor to Sax Kari, who worked for him and who assisted writer Preston Lauterbach in preparing his 2011 book The Chitlin' Circuit and the Road to Rock 'n' Roll, documenting the Ferguson brothers' work and influence.

Ferguson faced financial difficulties by the 1950s, losing his Indianapolis tavern and home due to debts, a lawsuit, and a $30,000 divorce settlement paid to his third wife. He declared bankruptcy in 1953.

== Personal life ==
Ferguson was married three times, including successively to two sisters, Ruth and Naomi Harrison. From the marriages came three children. Ferguson Sr. later married a German woman, Lilo Rantlach, with whom he had been in correspondence. After a brief marriage, they divorced by 1954.

In 1954, Ferguson faced a lawsuit after an automobile accident.

== Death ==
Ferguson died in 1957 in Indianapolis.
