= Big Ella =

American R&B singer and songwriter (1934–1992)

Ervaella "Big Ella" Tate (July 2, 1934 – April 30, 1992), was an American R&B singer and songwriter based in Memphis, Tennessee. She grew up singing in church and became a nightclub singer. Big Ella was known as "Queen of Club Paradise" and she released a few solo records in the late 1960s.

== Life and career ==
Born and raised in Memphis, Tennessee, Big Ella began her career singing in church. Her godfather was famed Rev. William Herbert Brewster, pastor of the East Trigg Avenue Baptist Church in South Memphis. She was a choir soloist at the church on Sundays. She was later a member of the Greater Deliverance Holiness Church.

While attending Hamilton High School, she played saxophone in the band.

In 1965, Big Ella was performing with R&B singer Rufus Thomas at 77 Sunset Strip on Park when nightclub owner Sunbeam Mitchell asked her to sing at his nightclub, Club Paradise in Memphis. She sang four nights a week at Club Paradise and one night at Mitchell's other nightclub, Club Handy. She received positive reviews for her "big, rich voice." She garnered the nickname "Queen of Club Paradise" and sang with various famous touring bands at the club, including Count Basie.

In 1967, Big Ella performed at the pre-Cotton Makers Jubilee Parade ceremonies.

She toured the United States and Europe with various blues and R&B performers such as Albert King, Rufus Thomas, B.B. King, Lou Rawls and O.V. Wright. As a recording artist, Big Ella released a single on Rush Records, Salem Records and Lo Lo Records.

Big Ella died following leg surgery at William F. Bowld Hospital in Memphis on April 30, 1992. Rufus Thomas remembered her as a singer who "could tear the house down."

She was survived by her husband Walter Tate, two sons, Victor L. Tate and Mauriciol L. Tate; a stepdaughter, two sisters, three brothers, grandchildren and great-grandchildren.

== Discography ==
=== Singles ===
- 1968: "The Queen" / "Please Don't Hurt Me" (Rush Records)
- 1969: "Too Hot To Hold" / "Come Back Home" (Salem Records)
- 1969 "It Takes A Lot Of Loving (To Satisfy Me)" / "I Need A Good Man" (Lo Lo Records)
