= Club Handy =

American nightclub in Memphis, Tennessee

Coordinates: 35°08′22″N 90°03′04″W

The Club Handy was a nightclub at 195 Hernando Street in Memphis, Tennessee. Originally called the Domino Lounge, the venue was owned and operated by Sunbeam Mitchell. He renamed the nightclub in honor of composer W.C. Handy in 1958. The Club Handy was a stop on the "Chitlin' Circuit," a selection of venues considered safe and acceptable for African-American entertainers in the era of racial segregation in the United States.

== History ==
In 1946, Sunbeam Mitchell and his wife Ernestine Mitchell leased two floors above Pantaze Drug Store at 195 Hernando Street. The opened the Domino Lounge on the second floor above the Pantaze Drug Store and the Mitchell Hotel on the third floor where the Mitchell's also lived. Another club had previously occupied the floor where the Domino Lounge was located, but it had closed down after someone had been killed there.

Elvis Presley saw Lowell Fulson perform at the Domino Lounge in 1954. Mitchell later recalled that Presley "was the one who'd come upstairs. I'd let him sit in with the band. I wouldn't let him in half the time. Audiences didn't want whites to mix with the blacks."

Following the death of composer W.C. Handy, "the father of the blues," Mitchell renamed the Domino Lounge after him in 1958.

B.B. King and his Blues Boy Orchestra performed at the opening of the Club Handy on May 5, 1958. At the Club Handy, Mitchell employed dancing girls called the Mitchellettes and a house band. The Club Handy Band was led by Bill Harvey.

Performers who appeared at the Club Handy include Little Junior Parker, Bobby "Blue" Bland, Ted Taylor, The "5" Royales, Jimmy McCracklin, Al "TNT" Braggs, Arthur Prysock, Ike & Tina Turner, and Big Ella.

The Club Handy sponsored a Ray Charles concert at Ellis Auditorium on August 20, 1961.

As the Civil Rights movement made strides in the 1960s, Club Handy became more integrated. In 1964, Mitchell commented that the Civil Rights Act had improved his business. "I get more white and colored trade than before," he said. He added that the Alcohol Licensing Commission "used to frown" on whites being served at Black nightclubs, but he hadn't heard anything since the act was passed. At the time, the Club Handy was one of three Black nightclubs in downtown Memphis to hold a cabaret license and allow dancing on the premises. The other two nightclubs were the Flamingo, on Hernando, and the Tropicana at 1331 Thomas.

In 1965, Mitchell opened the Club Paradise at 645 E. Georgia Avenue in Memphis. He continued to run the Club Handy on the side until he purchased the building occupied by the Club Paradise in 1966.

Photographer Ernest Withers took some of his iconic images of Memphis nightlife at the Club Handy and the Club Paradise.
