= Calderon Ballroom =

Coordinates: 33.4369°N 112.0472°W

The Calderon Ballroom was a music venue at 1610 E. Buckeye Road in Phoenix, Arizona, United States. It was one of the most popular dance halls in the state in the 1950s and 1960s, hosting the region's top Mexican and Latin bands. During its heyday, some of the top R&B acts performed at the Calderon Ballroom. It was a stop on the "Chitlin' Circuit," a selection of venues considered safe and acceptable for African-American entertainers in the era of racial segregation in the United States.

== History ==
The Calderon Ballroom was opened by Leonard Calderon on October 23, 1953. Calderon sold tires for B. F. Goodrich and before he opened the ballroom it was an auto repair shop. Calderon decided to turn it into a dance hall because there weren't any local venues for Mexican-Americans to dance on weekends. Calderon organized weekly Friday night dances at the Calderon Ballroom with musician Curtis Gray and his band as the house band.

The venue was located at 1610 E. Henshaw Road (later changed to Buckeye Road) in the neighborhood of Golden Gate Barrio in Phoenix, Arizona. The Buckeye Road area had a high crime rate so the city council proposed assigning more police presence in the area in 1956.

Calderon was public-minded and involved in many community activities. He rented the Calderon Ballroom out to social clubs and organizations for events. In August 1954, the Vesta Club sponsored a benefit dance at the Calderon Ballroom. The proceeds from the event were used for a scholarship given to an Arizona State College at Tempe student of Latino-American descent. In February 1956, a dance sponsored by Los Conquistadores of Arizona State College was held at the Calderon Ballroom.

At a time when many local venues did not accept African-American performers, Calderon welcomed them to his ballroom. He brought the top R&B performers to the Calderon Ballroom while still embracing Mexican music and booking regional bands.

In 1973, State Senator Alfredo Gutierrez told The Arizona Republic the "Mexican ballrooms in Phoenix, Calderon's, Riverside, Emma's and Salon Mexico, play a very important part in providing the Mexicano community with a sense of self-identity."

Calderon continued to operate the Calderon Ballroom until the 1980s. He hired a mariachi band, and the venue was also used for wedding receptions and quinceanera parties.

The ballroom was demolished as the Golden Gate Barrio neighborhood was razed due to eminent domain for the expansion of Phoenix Sky Harbor International Airport.

Calderon died at the age of 90 in Scottsdale, Arizona, on May 1, 2004.

== Notable performers ==
Notable acts who performed at the Calderon Ballroom include:

- Los Tres Diamantes
- Johnny "Guitar" Watson
- Little Willie John
- Rene Touzet
- Fats Domino
- Ray Charles
- Brook Benton
- James Brown and the Famous Flames
- Tito Puente
- Ike & Tina Turner
- Sam Cooke
- Manny Lopez
- Hank Ballard and the Midnighters
- Etta James
- Bobby Blue Bland
- Little Joe and the Latiniers
- Tyrone Davis
