= Chitlin' Circuit =

Venues central to Black American culture in the 1930s–'70s

The Chitlin' Circuit was a collection of performance venues found throughout the eastern, southern, and upper Midwest areas of the United States. They provided commercial and cultural acceptance for African-American musicians, comedians, and other entertainers following the era of venues run by the "white-owned-and-operated Theatre Owners Booking Association (TOBA)...formed in 1921." The Chitlin Circuit sustained black musicians and dancers during the era of racial segregation in the United States from the 1930s through the 1960s.

== Etymology ==
The name derives from the soul food dish chitterlings (boiled pig intestines). It is also a play on the term "Borscht Belt", which referred to particular resort venues (primarily in New York State's Catskill Mountains) very popular with Jewish performers and audiences during the 1940s through the 1960s.

Chitterlings are part of the culinary history of African Americans, who were often limited to the intestines of the pig to eat as opposed to the bacon or ham. Henry Louis Gates Jr. suggests the food symbolized acquiring a taste out of necessity and eventually coming to like it.

According to the Oxford English Dictionary, the earliest known use of the term "Chitlin' Circuit" was in a 1966 article in the Oakland Tribune, quoting Lou Rawls. In the 21st century, the term is applied to the venues, especially in the South, where contemporary African-American blues singers such as Bobby Rush, Denise LaSalle, and O.B. Buchana continue to appear regularly.

== Contemporary use ==
Ebony magazine prefers the term "urban theater circuit" for recent work like that of playwright and actor Tyler Perry. In a January 2004 interview with Perry, the genre's leading practitioner, Ebony wrote his work marked "a new chapter in the urban theater circuit as a whole—a genre that has been dogged by criticism from some Blacks in the traditional theater. Perry, as the most visibly recognized player in the circuit, has felt the brunt of this criticism." "They say that Tyler Perry has set the Black race back some 500 years with these types of "Chitlin' Circuit" shows. The problem with the naysayers is that they don't take the opportunity to see my shows,' Perry argued. "With my shows, I try to build a bridge that marries what's deemed 'legitimate theater' and so-called 'chitlin' circuit theater,' and I think I've done pretty well with that, in bringing people in to enjoy a more elevated level of theater.'"

In 2025, Beyoncé named her concert tour the Cowboy Carter and the Rodeo Chitlin' Circuit Tour, which supported her 2024 album Cowboy Carter.

== Origins ==
Leading figures in establishing the Chitlin' Circuit were the Black Indianapolis entrepreneurs Sea and Denver D. Ferguson. After the collapse of the Theatre Owners Booking Association (TOBA) in 1930, the Ferguson brothers drew on bandleader and influential columnist Walter Barnes and his contacts to bring top Black entertainers to Indianapolis in the 1930s. When their businesses' licenses were revoked in 1940, they opened Ferguson Brothers, a booking agency, which grew rapidly and became the most powerful Black-owned talent agency in the country. They helped various orchestras, bands, and vaudeville shows book gigs, including Jay McShann, King Kolax, Tiny Bradshaw, Roosevelt Sykes, Claude Trenier, the Bama State Collegians, Carolina Cotton Pickers, Snookum Russell, Milton Larkin, Clarence Love, Gene Pope, and the International Sweethearts of Rhythm, and organised tours around the South playing to Black audiences. Musician Sax Kari described Denver Ferguson as "the man who invented the chitlin’ circuit".

== Reach ==
The Chitlin' Circuit was primarily by, for and about black people. There are discrepancies among different sources about when the Circuit peaked, whether it was the 1930s, after World War II, or during the heyday of the blues. Several definitive books reviewed on NPR's Fresh Air have recognized "the names and careers of men and women – and, yes, some of the toughest of these people were women – who ran bars, booking agencies and clubs, where traveling musicians could come into a black community, play, make money and go to the next town."

The exclusionary systems of racial segregation necessitated the creation of a touring circuit for numerous African American, then Negro or Colored, musicians to make a living in U.S. cities from Indianapolis, Indiana and Clarksdale, Mississippi to "unlikely places like North Dakota and Minnesota" and more:

[V]enues ranged from rudimentary juke joints in rural areas to nightclubs, restaurants, and higher-end theaters in larger cities. For decades, the circuit was strongly associated with blues, jazz, rock, and soul musicians and singers such as Billie Holiday, B.B. King, Denise LaSalle, and James Brown. Entertainers felt they had “made it” if they performed at one of the highly coveted venues: Atlanta’s Royal Peacock, Baltimore’s Royal Theater, Chicago’s Regal Theater, Detroit’s Paradise Theatre, Harlem’s Apollo Theater, Philadelphia’s Uptown Theater and Washington, D.C.’s Howard and Lincoln Theaters.

The Chitlin' Circuit "eventually brought about the birth of rock 'n' roll" in the 1950s as the Civil Rights Movement emerged.

== Notable venues ==
Noted theaters, nightclubs, and dance halls on the Chitlin' Circuit included:

- Annapolis, Maryland: Carr's Beach
- Atlanta, Georgia: The Royal Peacock, originally The Top Hat
- Austin, Texas: The Victory Grill
- Baltimore, Maryland: The Royal Theatre
- Bay St. Louis, Mississippi: The 100 Men Hall
- Beaumont, Texas: The Raven Club
- Birmingham, Alabama: The Carver Theatre
- Bowling Green, Kentucky: The Quanset
- Chicago, Illinois: Robert's Show Lounge, Club DeLisa, and the Regal Theatre
- Cleveland, Ohio: Leo's Casino
- Detroit, Michigan: Paradise Theater, The Fox Theatre, The 20 Grand, Henry's Palace
- Dothan, Alabama: Club Capri
- Eatonville, Florida: Club Eaton
- Gaithersburg, Maryland: The Du-Drop Inn, Emory Grove
- Harlem, New York: Cotton Club, Smalls Paradise, and the Apollo Theater
- Hobson City, Alabama: The Men's Club, Holloway's Night Club
- Hopkinsville, Kentucky: The Skylark and The Chesterfield
- Idlewild, Michigan: The Paradise Club
- Indianapolis, Indiana: The Madam C. J. Walker Theatre
- Jacksonville, Florida: The Ritz Theatre
- Lebanon, Kentucky: Club Cherry
- Lexington, Kentucky: The Lyric Theatre
- Little Rock, Arkansas: Dreamland Ballroom
- Memphis, Tennessee: The Hippodrome, Club Handy, Club Paradise
- Milwaukee, Wisconsin: Club Metropole, Thelma's Back Door
- Norfolk, Virginia: Attucks Theatre "The Apollo of the South"
- Pensacola, Florida: Abe's 506 Club
- Philadelphia, Pennsylvania: Uptown Theatre
- Phoenix, Arizona: Calderon Ballroom
- Pittsburgh, Pennsylvania: New Granada
- Prichard, Alabama: The Harlem Duke Social Club
- Richmond, Virginia: The Hippodrome Theatre
- Rochester, New York: The Pythodd Room on Clarissa Street
- San Antonio, Texas: Eastwood Country Club, Keyhole Club (1619 West Poplar)
- Smithville, Texas: West End Park
- St. Augustine, Florida: The Odd Fellows Hall on Washington Street
- St. Petersburg, Florida: The Manhattan Casino
- Taylor, Texas: Chicken Shack, Hidalgo Park & One Acre Club
- Tampa, Florida: The Blue Note
- Tallahassee, Florida: The Red Bird Café
- Tulsa, Oklahoma: The Big 10 Ballroom
- Waco, Texas: Walker's Auditorium
- Washington, D.C.: Howard Theatre
- Williamsburg, Virginia: Log Cabin Beach

Seasonal venues included the still-standing auditorium at John Brown's Farm (also known as "the Kennedy Farm") outside Sharpsburg, Maryland; Carr's and Sparrow's Beach in Anne Arundel County, Maryland; and Rosedale Beach in Millsboro, Delaware.

According to Ruth Brown, an artist needed to play at four specific theaters to prove they had made it: the Regal in Chicago, the Howard in Washington, D.C., the Uptown in Philadelphia, and the Apollo in New York City. This was called the "litchman chain".

The song "Tuxedo Junction" was written about a stop along the Chitlin' Circuit in Birmingham. Once the performance was over, the band would leave for the next stop on the circuit. After composing the music, Erskine Hawkins explained the reason for the title to Buddy Feyne, who created lyrics to express the concept.

== Notable performers ==
Notable performers who worked on the Chitlin' Circuit included:

- Albert King
- Aretha Franklin
- B. B. King
- Billie Holiday
- Bo Diddley
- Bobby "Blue" Bland
- Bobby Rush
- Bobby Womack & The Valentinos
- Cab Calloway
- Candi Staton
- Count Basie
- Diana Ross and The Supremes
- Dionne Warwick
- Dorothy Dandridge
- Duke Ellington
- Ella Fitzgerald
- Etta James
- Fats Domino
- Flip Wilson
- Freddy King
- Gladys Knight & the Pips
- Howlin' Wolf
- Ike & Tina Turner
- Jackie Wilson
- James Brown & The Famous Flames
- Jay McShann
- Jimi Hendrix
- Joe Tex
- John Lee Hooker
- Johnnie Taylor
- The Johnny Otis Show
- Lena Horne
- Little Richard
- Little Milton
- Louis Jordan
- Lucky Millinder
- Martha and the Vandellas
- Marvin Gaye & Tammi Terrell
- Moms Mabley
- Muddy Waters
- Nona Hendryx
- Otis Redding
- Patti LaBelle (and Labelle)
- Peg Leg Bates
- Pigmeat Markham
- Ray Charles
- Redd Foxx
- Richard Pryor
- Roosevelt Sykes
- Roy Hamilton
- Rudy Ray Moore
- Sam Cooke
- Sammy Davis Jr.
- Sarah Vaughn
- Screamin' Jay Hawkins
- Soul Children
- Teddy Wilson
- The Dramatics
- The Four Tops
- The Isley Brothers
- The Jackson 5
- The Miracles
- The Temptations
- Tiny Bradshaw
- Tyrone Davis
- Willie Hightower
- Wilson Pickett

== Mississippi Blues Trail marker ==
A historic marker designated by the Mississippi Blues Commission on the Mississippi Blues Trail was placed in front of the 100 Men Hall in Bay St. Louis, Mississippi. The 100 Men Hall is one of the rare still standing, still active blues venues on the trail. The second historic marker designated by the Mississippi Blues Commission on the Mississippi Blues Trail was placed in front of the Southern Whispers Restaurant on Nelson Street in Greenville, Mississippi, a stop on the Chitlin' Circuit in the early days of the blues. The marker commemorates the importance of this site in the history of the blues in Mississippi. In the 1940s and 1950s, this historic strip drew crowds to the flourishing club scene to hear Delta blues, big band, jump blues, and jazz.

== See also ==
- Imperial Hotel (Thomasville, Georgia)
- The Negro Motorist Green Book
- Sawdust trail
